= Suriname =

Country in South America

Republic of Suriname Republiek Suriname
- Flag Coat of arms
- Motto: Justitia – Pietas – Fides (Latin); Gerechtigheid – Vroomheid – Vertrouwen (Dutch) "Justice – Piety – Trust"
- Anthem: God zij met ons Suriname (Dutch) "God be with our Suriname"
- Land controlled by Suriname shown in dark green; claimed land shown in light green.
- Capital and largest city: Paramaribo; 5°50′N 55°10′W
- Official languages: Dutch
- Recognised regional languages: 8 Indigenous languages: Akurio; Lokono; Carib-Kari'nja; Sikiana-Kashuyana; Tiro-Tiriyó; Waiwai; Warao; Wayana
- Lingua franca: Sranan Tongo
- Other languages: 15 other languages: Sarnami Hindustani; Surinamese-Javanese; Ndyuka; Saramaccan; Matawai; Aluku; Paramaccan; Kwinti; Hakka; Mandarin; Levantine Arabic; English; Portuguese; Spanish; French
- Ethnic groups (2012): 27.4% Indian; 21.7% Maroon; 15.7% Creole; 13.7% Javanese; 13.4% Multiracial; 3.8% Indigenous; 1.5% Chinese; 0.3% European
- Religion (2012): 48.4% Christianity; 26.75% Protestantism; 21.65% Roman Catholicism; 22.3% Hinduism; 17.97% Sanātanī; 3.08% Arya Samaj; 1.23% Other Hindu; 13.9% Islam; 3.91% Sunni; 2.61% Ahmadiyya; 7.34% Other Muslim; 1.8% Winti; 0.8% Kejawèn; 0.03% Judaism; 7.52% no religion; 2.04% Not stated; 1.11% Don't know; 0.85% Others
- Demonym: Surinamese
- Government: Unitary assembly-independent presidential republic
  - President: Jennifer Geerlings-Simons
  - Vice President: Gregory Rusland
  - National Assembly Chairman: Ashwin Adhin
  - High Court of Justice President: Iwan Rasoelbaks (acting)
- Legislature: National Assembly

Independence from the Netherlands
  - Constituent country within the Kingdom of the Netherlands: 15 December 1954
  - Independence received: 25 November 1975

Area
  - Total: 165,940 km^{2} (64,070 sq mi) (90th)
  - Water (%): 1.1

Population
  - 2022 estimate: ▲632,638 (170th)
  - Density: 3.9/km^{2} (10.1/sq mi) (231st)
- GDP (PPP): 2025 estimate
  - Total: ▲$14.743 billion (160th)
  - Per capita: ▲$22,439 (91st)
- GDP (nominal): 2025 estimate
  - Total: ▲$4.506 billion (173rd)
  - Per capita: ▼$6,858 (106th)
- HDI (2023): ▲0.722 high (114th)
- Currency: Surinamese dollar (SRD)
- Time zone: UTC-03:00 (SRT)
- Date format: dd/mm/yyyy
- Calling code: +597
- ISO 3166 code: SR
- Internet TLD: .sr

Suriname, (Note: /ˈsʊərɪnæm, -nɑːm/ SOOR-in-A(H)M; Dutch: [syːriˈnaːmə]; Sranan Tongo: Sranankondre [sɾanankondɾe] (lit. 'Surinamese country') or just Sranan [sraˈnãŋ]; Sarnámi Hindustáni: षर्नाम् Sarnam [sarnām]; Surinamese Javanese: ꦱꦿꦶꦤꦩ Srinama [srinamah]; Eastern Maroon Creole: Saanankondee (lit. 'Surinamese country') or just Saanan; Saramaccan: Saanaköndë or just Saana) officially the Republic of Suriname, (Note: Dutch: Republiek Suriname [reːpyˈblik syːriˈnaːmə]) is a country on the northern coast of South America, also considered part of the Caribbean region. Situated slightly north of the equator, over 95% of its territory is covered by rainforest, the second-highest proportion of forest cover in the world. Suriname is bordered by the Atlantic Ocean to the north, French Guiana to the east, Brazil to the south, and Guyana to the west. It is the smallest sovereign country in South America by both population and territory, (Note: Both French Guiana and Falkland Islands are less extensive and populous, but they are an overseas department and region of France and an overseas territory of the United Kingdom respectively.) with around 612,985 inhabitants in 2021 in an area of approximately 165,940 square kilometres (64,070 square miles). The capital and largest city is Paramaribo, which is home to roughly half the population.

Suriname was inhabited as early as the fourth millennium BC by various Indigenous peoples, including the Lokono, Kalina, and Wayana. Europeans arrived and contested the area in the 16th century, with the Dutch controlling much of the country's current territory by the late 17th century. Under Dutch rule, Suriname was a lucrative plantation colony focused mostly on sugar; its economy was driven by African slave labour, with approximately 300,000 enslaved Africans taken there during the transatlantic slave trade, from the mid-1600s to the early 1800s. After the abolition of slavery in 1863, indentured servants were recruited mostly from British India and the Dutch East Indies. In 1954, Suriname became a constituent country of the Kingdom of the Netherlands. On 25 November 1975, it became independent following negotiations with the Dutch government. Suriname continues to maintain close diplomatic, economic, and cultural ties with the Netherlands. Surinamese culture and society strongly reflect the legacy of Dutch colonial rule.

Suriname is the only independent state outside Europe where Dutch is the official and prevailing language of government, business, media, and education; an estimated 60% of the population speaks Dutch as a native language. Sranan Tongo, an English-based creole language, is a widely used lingua franca, and English itself is also widespread. Most Surinamese are descendants of slaves brought from Africa by Europeans, and indentured labourers brought from Asia by the Dutch. Suriname is highly diverse, with no ethnic group forming a majority; proportionally, its Muslim and Hindu populations are some of the largest in the Americas. Most people live along the northern coast, centred on Paramaribo, making Suriname one of the least densely populated countries on Earth.

Suriname is a developing country with a high level of human development; its economy is heavily dependent on its abundant natural resources, namely bauxite, gold, petroleum, and agricultural products. Suriname is a member of the Caribbean Community (CARICOM), the United Nations, the Organisation of Islamic Cooperation and the Organization of American States.

== Etymology ==
The name Suriname may derive from an Indigenous people called Surinen, who inhabited the area at the time of European contact. The suffix -ame, common in Surinamese river and place names (see also the Coppename River), may come from aima or eima, meaning river or creek mouth, in Lokono, an Arawakan language spoken in the country.

The earliest European sources give variants of "Suriname" as the name of the river on which colonies were eventually founded. Lawrence Kemys wrote in his Relation of the Second Voyage to Guiana of passing a river called "Shurinama" as he travelled along the coast. In 1598, a fleet of three Dutch ships visiting the Wild Coast mention passing the river "Surinamo". In 1617, a Dutch notary spelled the name of the river on which a Dutch trading post had existed three years earlier as "Surrenant".

British settlers, who in 1630 founded the first European colony at Marshall's Creek along the Suriname River, spelled the name "Surinam"; this would long remain the standard spelling in English. The Dutch navigator David Pietersz. de Vries wrote of travelling up the "Sername" river in 1634 until he encountered the English colony there; the terminal vowel remained in future Dutch spellings and pronunciations. The river was called Soronama in a 1640 Spanish manuscript entitled "General Description of All His Majesty's Dominions in America". In 1653, instructions given to a British fleet sailing to meet Lord Willoughby in Barbados, which at the time was the seat of English colonial government in the region, again spelled the name of the colony Surinam. A 1663 royal charter said the region around the river was "called Serrinam also Surrinam".

As a result of the Surrinam spelling, 19th-century British sources offered the folk etymology Surryham, saying it was the name given to the Suriname River by Lord Willoughby in the 1660s in honour of the Duke of Norfolk and Earl of Surrey when an English colony was established under a grant from King Charles II. This folk etymology can be found repeated in later English-language sources.

When the territory was taken over by the Dutch, it became part of a group of colonies known as Dutch Guiana. The official spelling of the country's English name was changed from "Surinam" to "Suriname" in January 1978, but "Surinam" can still be found in English, such as Surinam Airways and the Surinam toad. The older English name is reflected in the English pronunciation, /ˈsjʊərɪnæm, -nɑːm/. In Dutch, the official language of Suriname, the pronunciation is [ˌsyːriˈnaːmə], with a schwa terminal vowel and the main stress on the third syllable.

== History ==
=== Pre-colonial ===
Indigenous settlement of Suriname dates back to 3,000 BC. The largest tribes were the Lokono, a nomadic coastal tribe that subsisted on hunting, foraging and fishing. The Lokono represent the first described inhabitants in the area. The Carib also settled in the area and conquered the Lokono by using their superior sailing ships. They settled in Galibi (Kupali Yumï, meaning "tree of the forefathers") at the mouth of the Marowijne River. While the larger Lokono and Carib tribes lived along the coast and savanna, smaller groups of indigenous people lived in the inland rainforest, such as the Akurio, Trió, Warao, and Wayana.

=== Colonial period ===
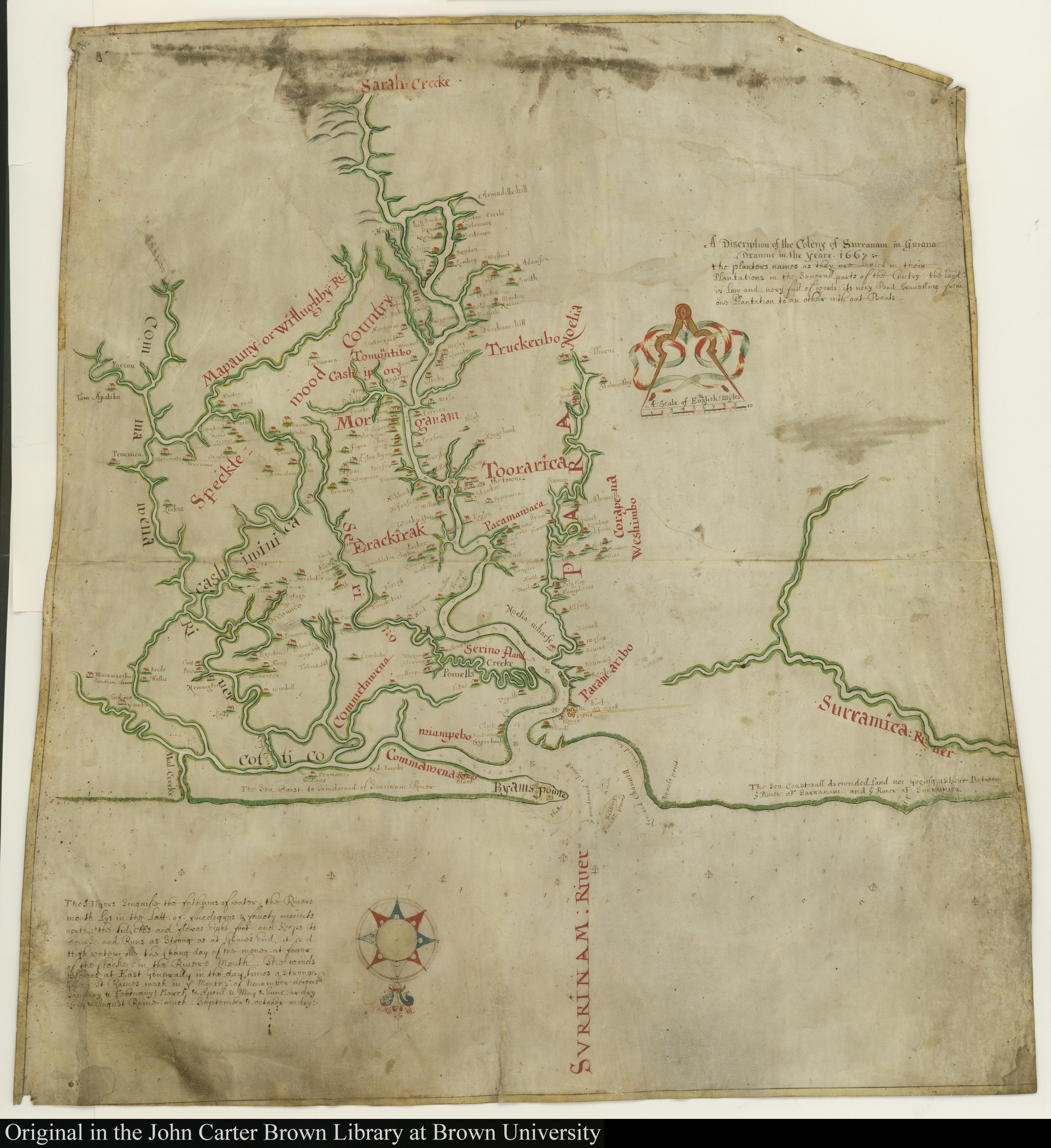
The earliest known map of Suriname.

Beginning in the 16th century, French, Spanish and English explorers visited the area. A century later, Dutch and English settlers established plantation colonies along the many rivers in the fertile Guiana plains. The earliest documented colony in Guiana was an English settlement named Marshall's Creek along the Suriname River. After that, there was another short-lived English colony called Surinam that lasted from 1650 to 1667.

From the early 17th century, Jews began to settle there after the expulsion from Spain and Portugal. They were granted freedom of religion in 1665 and the right to have their own courts and civil guard. They continued to enjoy autonomy after the colony was handed over to the Netherlands. Over half the sugarcane plantations in Suriname were owned by Jews, who received a permit to work areas that were pure jungle into agriculture. In 1825, these special rights were rescinded.

Disputes arose between the Dutch and the English for control of this territory. In 1667, during negotiations leading to the Treaty of Breda after the Second Anglo-Dutch War, the Dutch decided to keep the nascent plantation colony of Surinam they had gained from the English. In return the English kept New Amsterdam, the main city of the former colony of New Netherland in North America on the mid-Atlantic coast. The British renamed it New York, after the Duke of York who would later become King James II of England. In 1675, the English population was evacuated and resettled in Jamaica.

In 1683, the Society of Suriname was founded by the city of Amsterdam, the Van Aerssen van Sommelsdijck family, and the Dutch West India Company. The society was chartered to manage and defend the colony. The planters of the colony relied heavily on African slaves to cultivate, harvest and process the commodity crops of coffee, cocoa, sugar cane and cotton plantations along the rivers. Approximately 300,000 enslaved Africans were taken to Suriname during the transatlantic slave trade, from the mid-1600s to the early 1800s. The treatment of slaves was notoriously brutal even by the standards of the time—historian C. R. Boxer wrote that "man's inhumanity to man just about reached its limits in Surinam"—and many slaves escaped plantations. In November 1795, the Society was nationalized by the Batavian Republic and from then on the Batavian Republic and its legal successors (the Kingdom of Holland and the Kingdom of the Netherlands) governed the territory as a national colony – barring two periods of British occupation, between 1799 and 1802, and between 1804 and 1816.

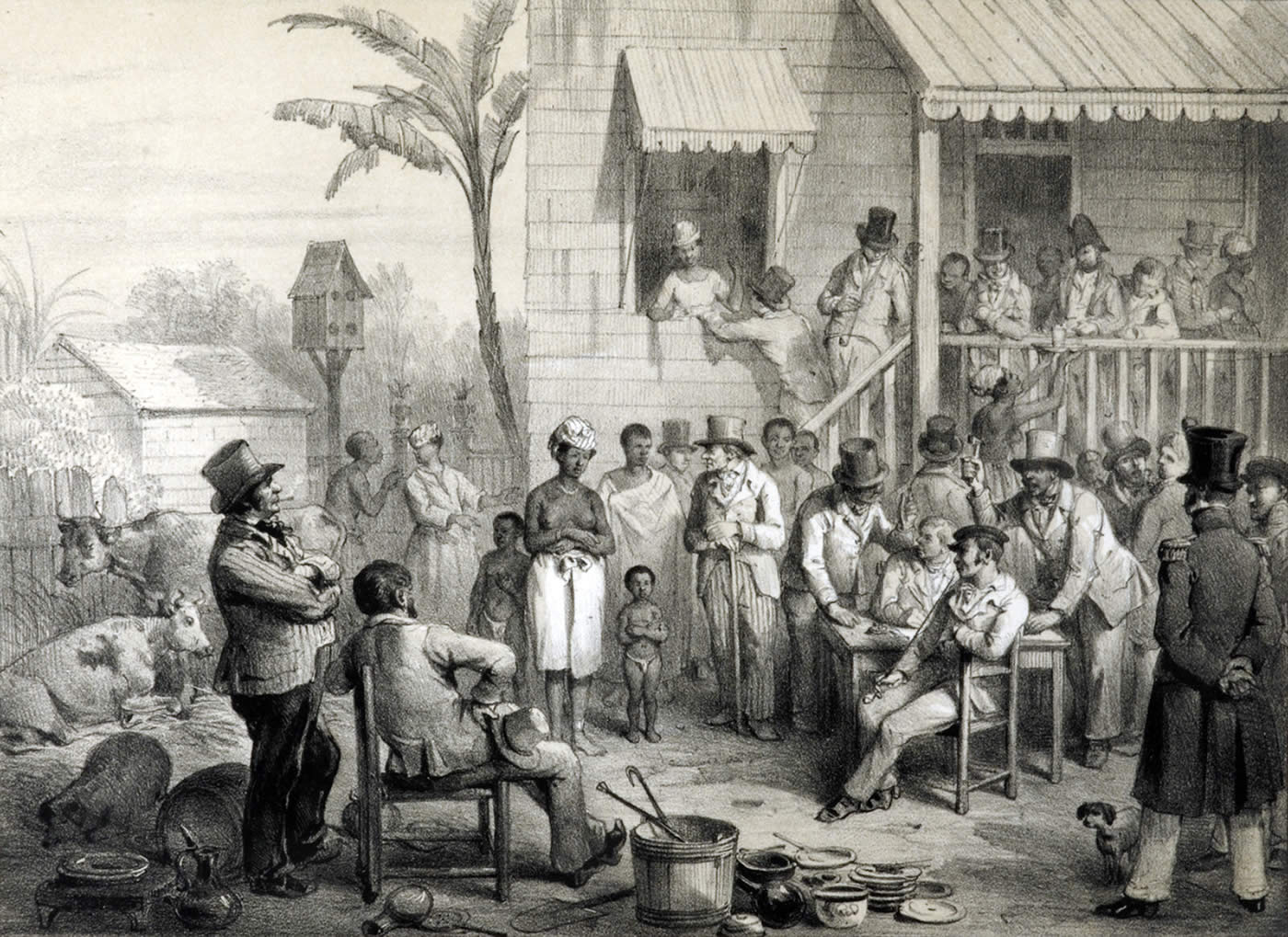
Slave auction in Paramaribo, in 1831

With the help of the native South Americans living in the adjoining rain forests, runaway African slaves established a new and unique culture in the interior that was highly successful in its own right. They were known collectively in English as Maroons, in French as Nèg'Marrons (literally meaning "brown negroes", that is "pale-skinned negroes"), and in Dutch as Marrons. The Maroons gradually developed several independent tribes through a process of ethnogenesis, as they were from different African ethnicities. These tribes include the Saramaka, Paramaka, Ndyuka or Aukan, Kwinti, Aluku or Boni, and Matawai.

The Maroons often raided plantations to recruit new members from the enslaved and capture women, as well as to acquire weapons, food, and supplies. They sometimes killed the Dutch planters and their families in the raids. European colonists built defences, which were significant enough that they were shown on 18th-century maps.

The Dutch colonists also mounted armed campaigns against the Maroons, who generally escaped through the rainforest, which they knew much better than the colonists did. To end hostilities, in the 18th century, the European colonial authorities signed several peace treaties with different tribes. They granted the Maroons sovereign status and trade rights in their inland territories.

=== Abolition of slavery ===
From 1861 to 1863, with the American Civil War underway, and enslaved people escaping to Northern territory controlled by the Union, United States President Abraham Lincoln and his administration looked abroad for places to relocate people who were freed from enslavement and who wanted to leave the United States. It opened negotiations with the Dutch government regarding African American emigration to and colonization of the Dutch colony of Suriname. Nothing came of the idea, which was dropped after 1864.

The Netherlands abolished slavery in Suriname in 1863, under a gradual process that required slaves to work on plantations for 10 transition years for minimal pay, which was considered as partial compensation for their masters. After that transition period expired in 1873, most freedmen largely abandoned the plantations where they had worked for several generations in favour of the capital city, Paramaribo. Some of them were able to purchase the plantations they worked on, especially in the district of Para and Coronie. Their descendants still live on those grounds today. Several plantation owners did not pay their former enslaved workers the pay they owed them for the ten years following 1863. They paid the workers with the property rights of the ground of the plantation in order to escape their debt to the workers. 1 July 1863 is called Ketikoti.

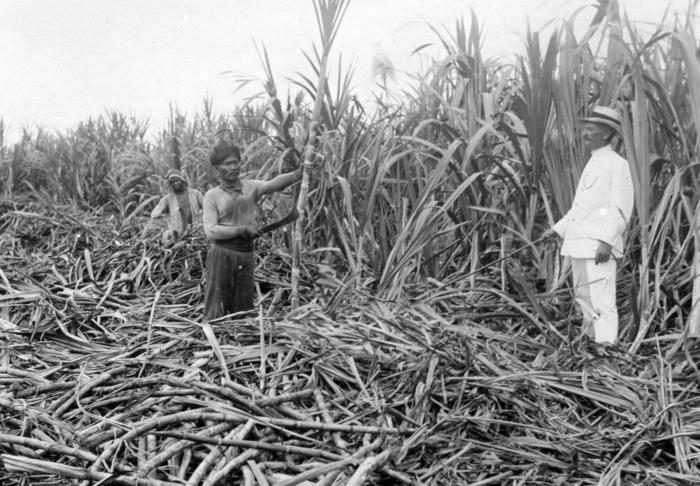
Javanese indentured servants in Marienbourg plantation, c. 1930

As a plantation colony, Suriname had an economy dependent on labour-intensive commodity crops. To make up for a shortage of labour, the Dutch recruited and transported contract or indentured labourers from the Dutch East Indies (modern Indonesia) and India (the latter through an arrangement with the British, who then ruled the area). In addition, during the late 19th and early 20th centuries, small numbers of labourers, mostly men, were recruited from China and the Middle East.

Although Suriname's population remains relatively small, because of this complex colonisation and exploitation, it is one of the most ethnically and culturally diverse countries in the world.

=== Decolonization ===
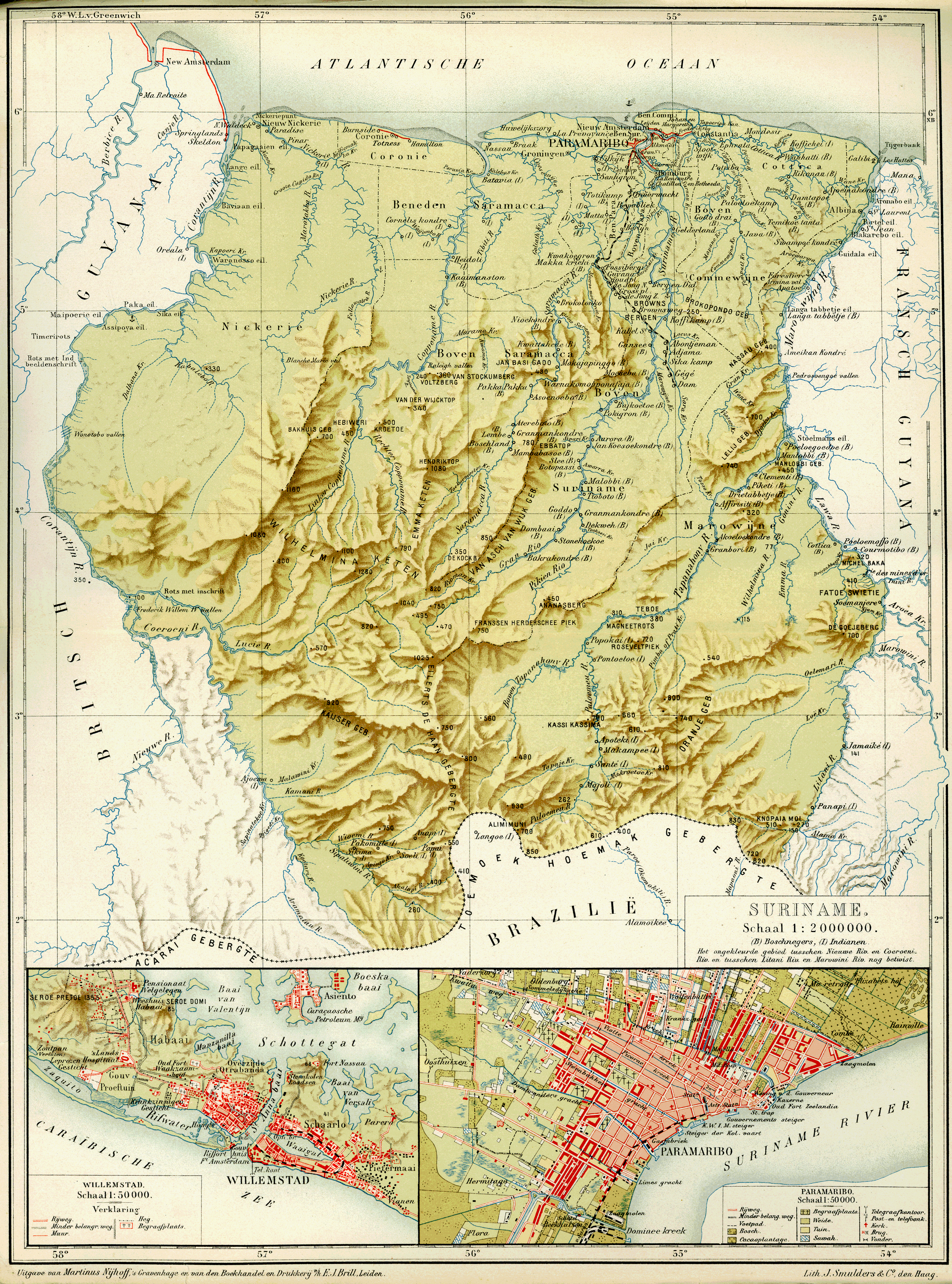
Suriname in 1914

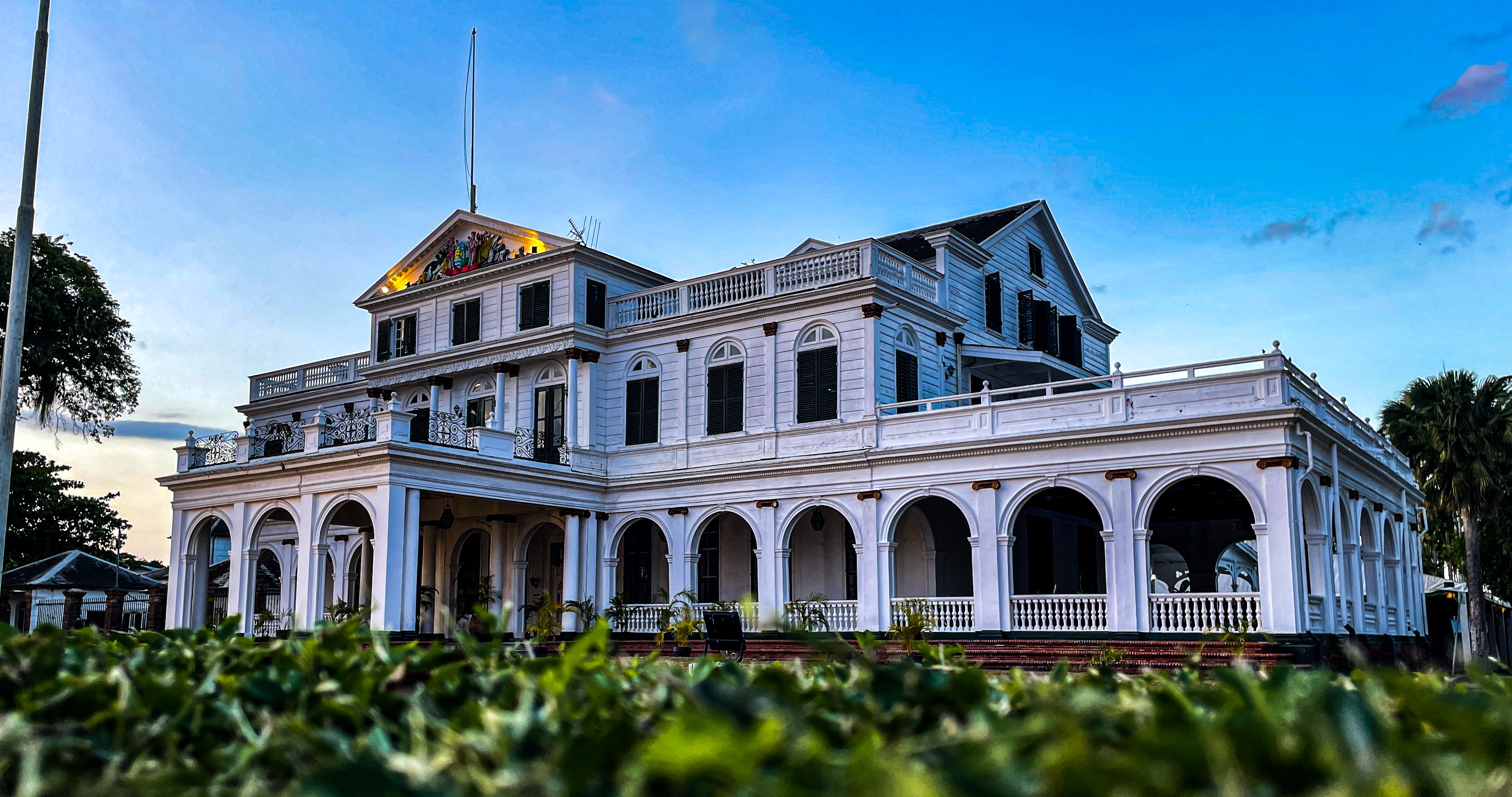
Presidential Palace of Suriname

During World War II, on 23 November 1941, under an agreement with the Netherlands government-in-exile, the United States sent 2,000 soldiers to Suriname to protect the bauxite mines to support the Allies' war effort. In 1942, the Dutch government-in-exile began to review the relations between the Netherlands and its colonies in terms of the post-war period.

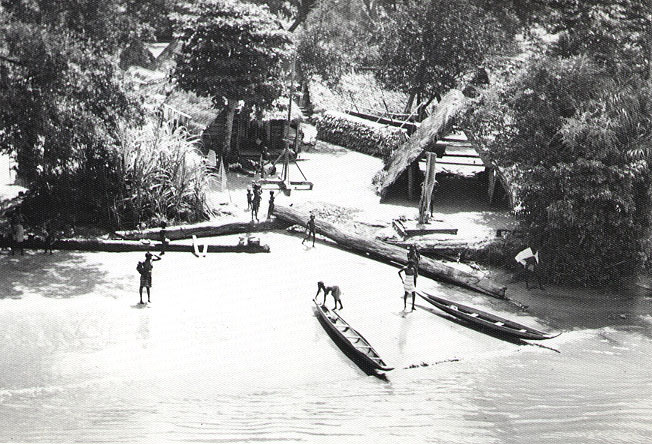
Maroon village, along Suriname River, 1955

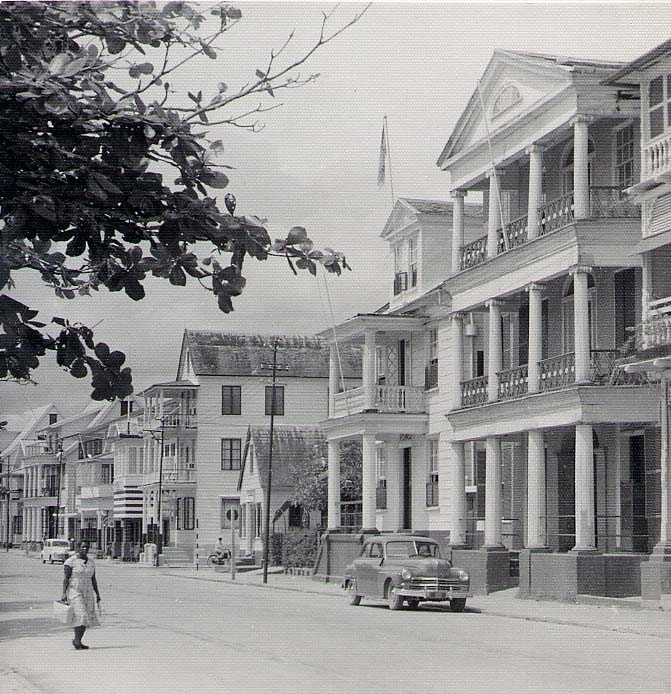
Waterfront houses in Paramaribo, 1955

In 1954, Suriname became one of the constituent countries of the Kingdom of the Netherlands, along with the Netherlands Antilles and the Netherlands. In this construction, the Netherlands retained control of its defence and foreign affairs. In 1974, the local government, led by the National Party of Suriname (NPS) (whose membership was largely Creole, meaning ethnically African or mixed African-European), started negotiations with the Dutch government leading towards full independence; in contrast to Indonesia's earlier war for independence from the Netherlands, the path toward Suriname's independence had been an initiative of the then left-wing Dutch government. Independence was granted on 25 November 1975. A large part of Suriname's economy for the first decade following independence was fuelled by foreign aid provided by the Dutch government.

=== Independence ===
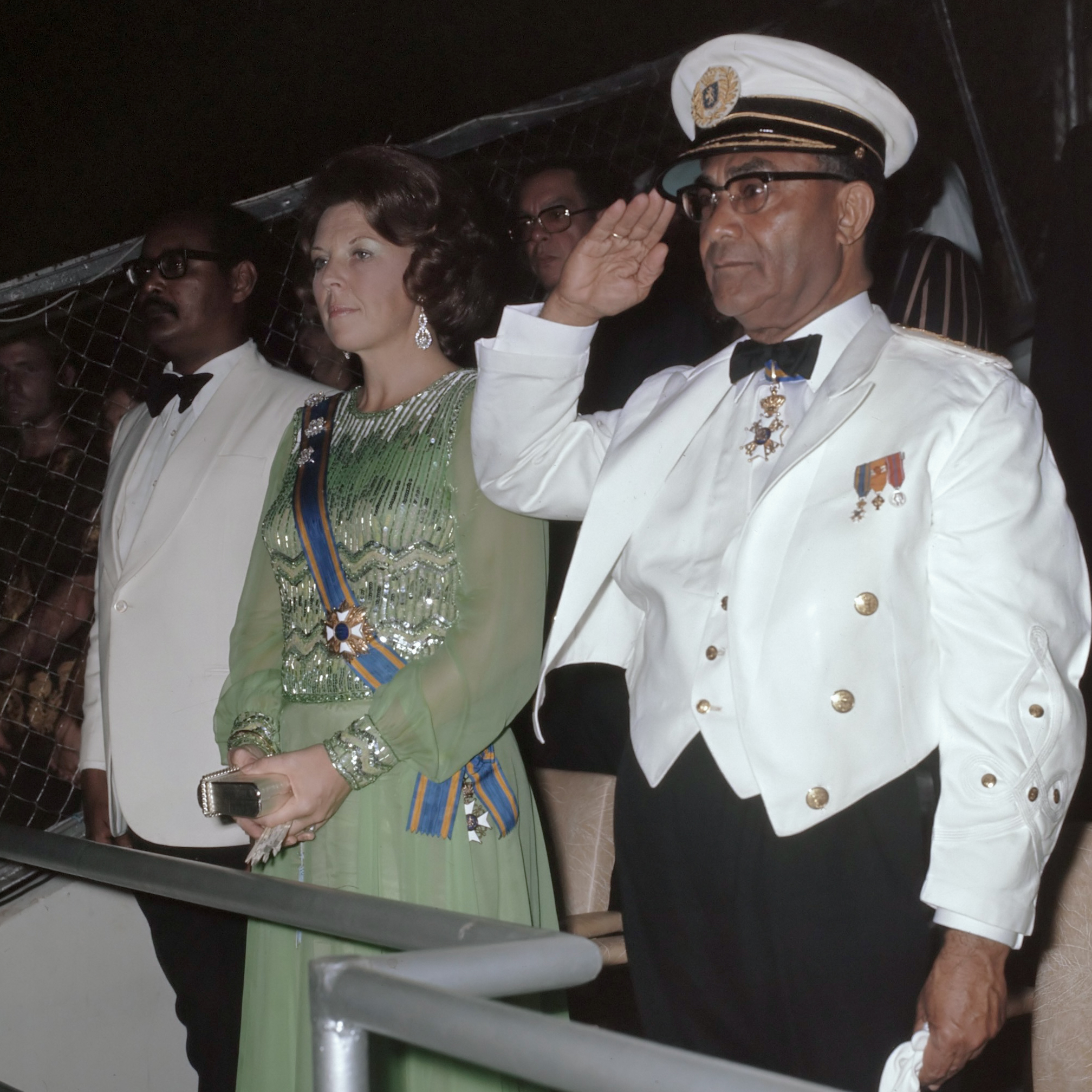
Prime Minister Henck Arron, future queen Beatrix of the Netherlands and President Johan Ferrier on 25 November 1975

The first president of the country was Johan Ferrier, the former governor, with Henck Arron (the then leader of the NPS) as prime minister. In the years leading up to independence, nearly one-third of the population of Suriname emigrated to the Netherlands, amidst concern that the new country would fare worse under independence than it had as a constituent country of the Kingdom of the Netherlands. Surinamese politics did degenerate into ethnic polarisation and corruption soon after independence, with the NPS using Dutch aid money for partisan purposes. Its leaders were accused of fraud in the 1977 elections, in which Arron won a further term, and the discontent was such that a large portion of the population fled to the Netherlands, joining the already significant Surinamese community there.

=== 1980 military coup ===
On 25 February 1980, a military coup overthrew Arron's government. It was initiated by a group of 16 sergeants, led by Dési Bouterse. Opponents of the military regime attempted counter-coups in April 1980, August 1980, 15 March 1981, and again on 12 March 1982. The first counter attempt was led by Fred Ormskerk, the second by Marxist-Leninists, the third by Wilfred Hawker, and the fourth by Surendre Rambocus.

Hawker escaped from prison during the fourth counter-coup attempt, but he was captured and summarily executed. Between 2 am and 5 am on 7 December 1982, the military, under Bouterse's leadership, rounded up 13 prominent citizens who had criticized the military dictatorship and held them at Fort Zeelandia in Paramaribo. The dictatorship had all these men executed over the next three days, along with Rambocus and Jiwansingh Sheombar (who was also involved in the fourth counter-coup attempt).

=== Civil war, elections, and constitution ===
The brutal civil war between the Suriname army and Maroons loyal to rebel leader Ronnie Brunswijk, begun in 1986, continued and its effects further weakened Bouterse's position during the 1990s. Due to the civil war, more than 10,000 Surinamese, mostly Maroons, fled to French Guiana in the late 1980s.

National elections were held in 1987. The National Assembly adopted a new constitution that allowed Bouterse to remain in charge of the army. Dissatisfied with the government, Bouterse summarily dismissed the ministers in 1990, by telephone. This event became popularly known as the "Telephone Coup". His power began to wane after the 1991 elections.

At the 1988 Summer Olympics in Seoul, Suriname became the smallest independent South American state to win its first ever Olympic medal as Anthony Nesty won gold in the 100-metre butterfly.

The first half of 1999 was marked by non-violent national protests against poor general economic and social conditions. By mid-year, the Netherlands tried Bouterse in absentia on drug-smuggling charges. He was convicted and sentenced to prison but remained in Suriname.

=== 21st century ===
In 2002, the inner historic city in Suriname's capital, Paramaribo, was inscribed on the list as a UNESCO World Heritage Site, for its outstanding collection of Dutch colonial architecture.

On 19 July 2010, Bouterse returned to power when he was elected as the president of Suriname. Before his election in 2010, he, along with 24 others, had been charged with the murders of 15 prominent dissidents in the December murders. However, in 2012, two months before the verdict in the trial, the National Assembly extended its amnesty law and provided Bouterse and the others with amnesty of these charges. He was reelected on 14 July 2015. However, Bouterse was convicted by a Surinamese court on 29 November 2019 and given a 20-year sentence for his role in the 1982 killings.

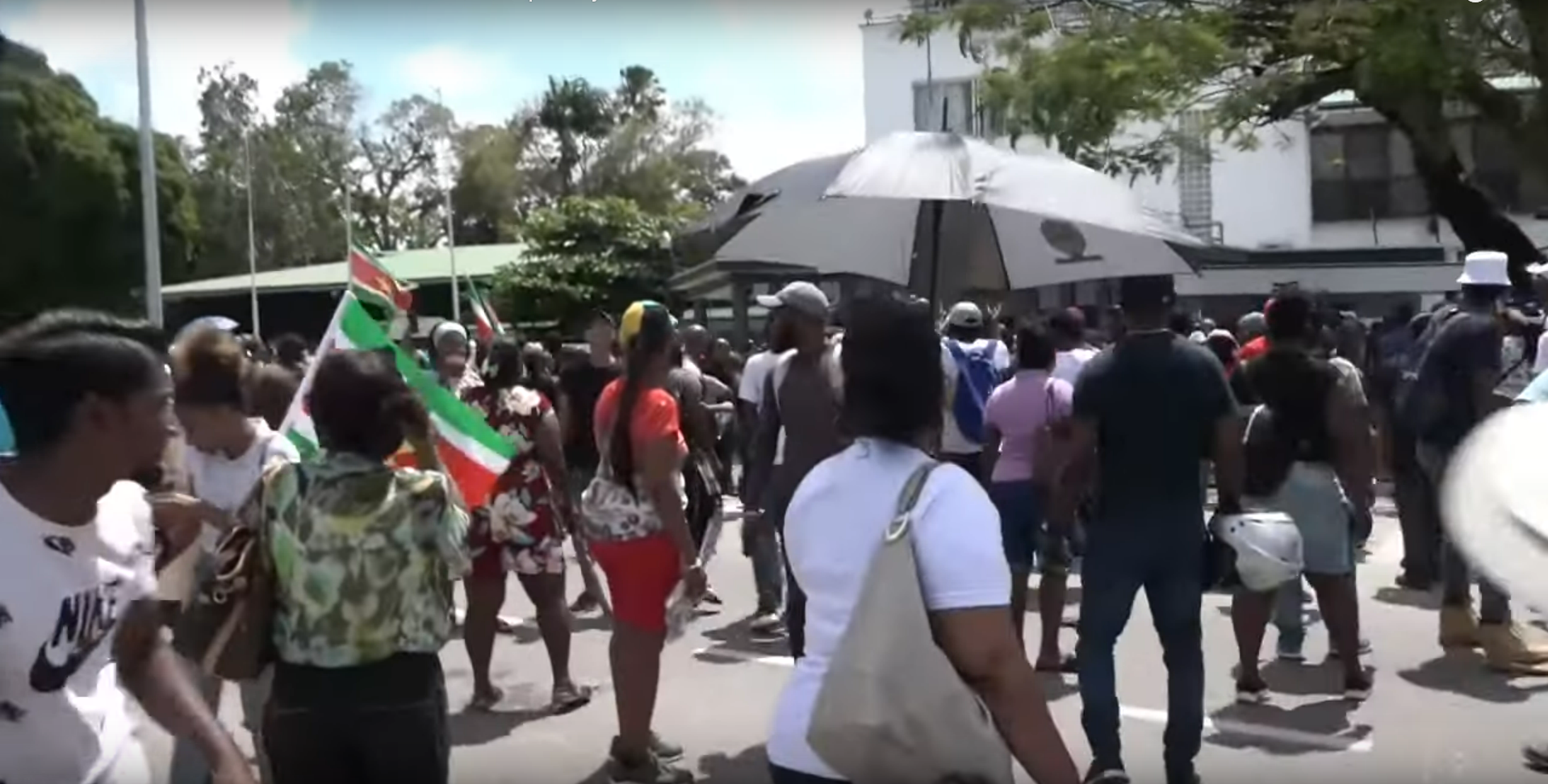
Protesters stormed the National Assembly building in February 2023

After winning the 2020 elections, Chan Santokhi was the sole nomination for president of Suriname. On 13 July, Santokhi was elected president by acclamation in an uncontested election. He was inaugurated on 16 July in a ceremony without public attendance due to the COVID-19 pandemic.

In February 2023, there were heavy protests against rising living costs in the capital Paramaribo. Protesters accused the government of President Chan Santokhi of corruption. They stormed the National Assembly, demanding the government to resign. However, the government condemned the protests. In December 2024, Desi Bouterse, Suriname's fugitive former president, died.

On 6 July 2025, Jennifer Geerlings-Simons of the National Democratic Party (NDP) was elected as Suriname's first woman president by the parliament.

== Geography ==
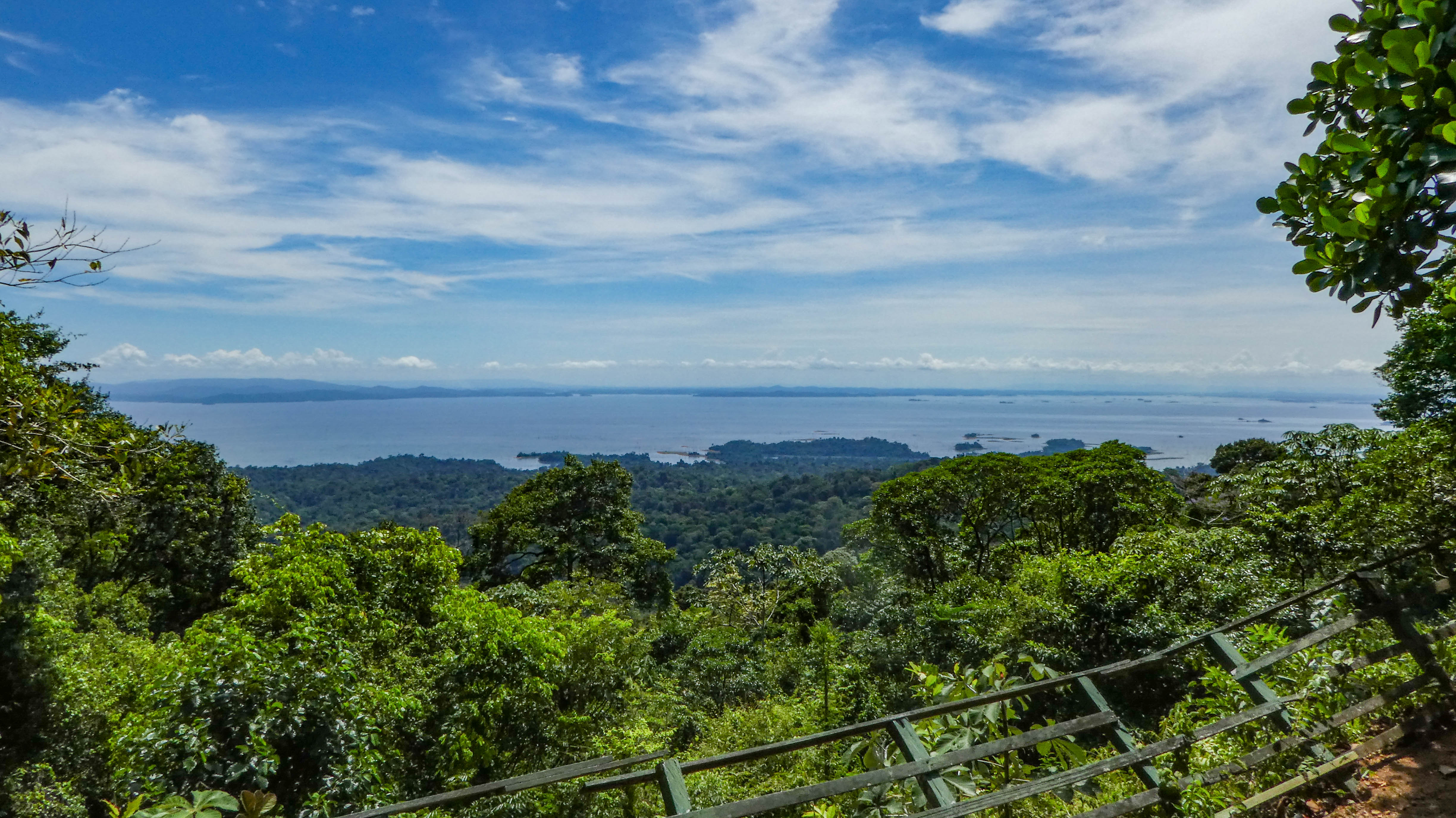
Brokopondo Reservoir surrounded by tropical rainforest

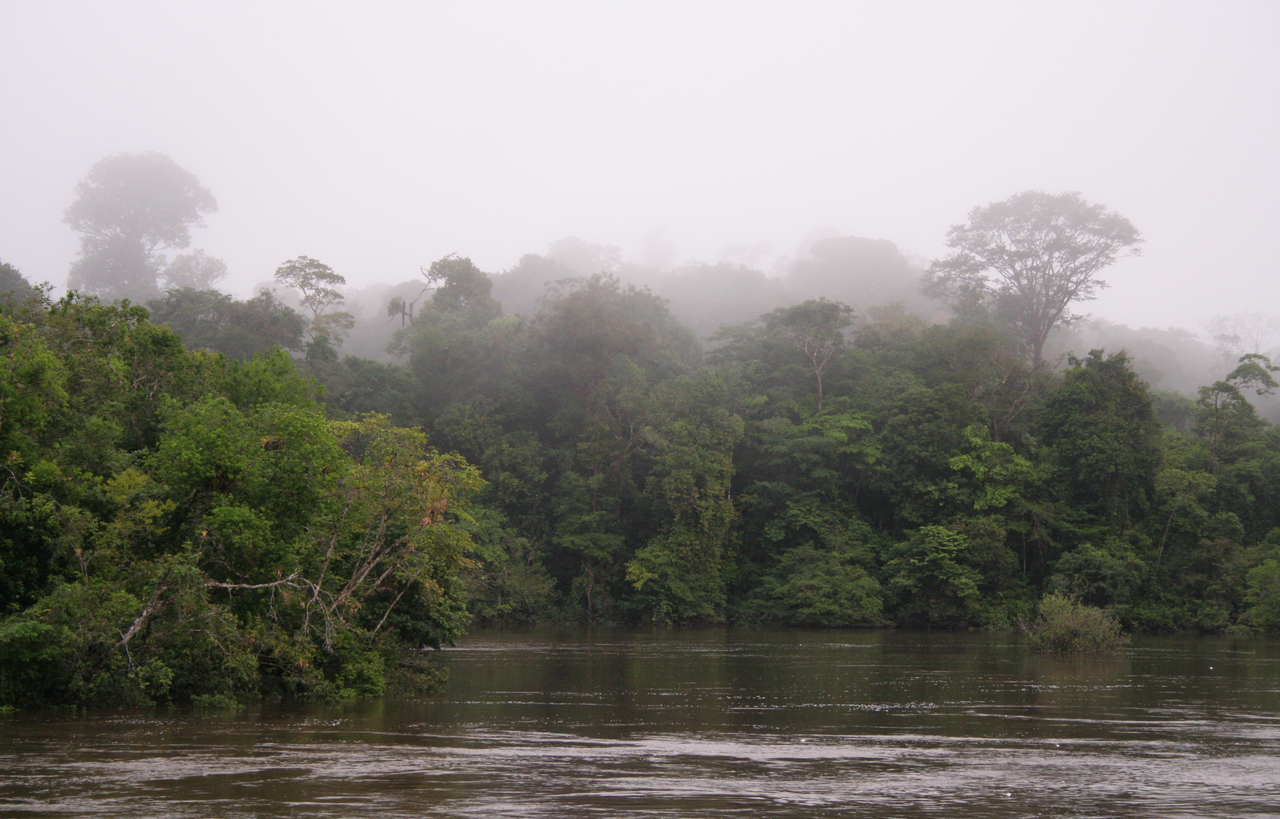
The Coppename river, one of many rivers in the interior

Geology of Suriname

Suriname is the smallest sovereign country in South America. Situated on the Guiana Shield, it lies mostly between latitudes 1° and 6°N, and longitudes 54° and 58°W. The country can be divided into two main geographic regions. The northern, lowland coastal area (roughly above the line Albina-Paranam-Wageningen) has been cultivated, and most of the population lives here. The southern part consists of tropical rainforest and sparsely inhabited savanna along the border with Brazil, covering about 80% of Suriname's land surface.

The two main mountain ranges are the Bakhuis Mountains and the Van Asch Van Wijck Mountains. Julianatop is the highest mountain in the country at 1,286 metres (4,219 ft) above sea level. Other mountains include Tafelberg at 1,026 metres (3,366 ft), Mount Kasikasima at 718 metres (2,356 ft), Goliathberg at 358 metres (1,175 ft) and Voltzberg at 240 metres (790 ft).

Suriname contains six terrestrial ecoregions: Guayanan Highlands moist forests, Guianan moist forests, Paramaribo swamp forests, Tepuis, Guianan savanna, and Guianan mangroves. Its forest cover is 90.2%, the highest of any nation in the world. The country had a 2019 Forest Landscape Integrity Index mean score of 9.39/10, ranking it fifth globally out of 172 countries.

=== Borders ===
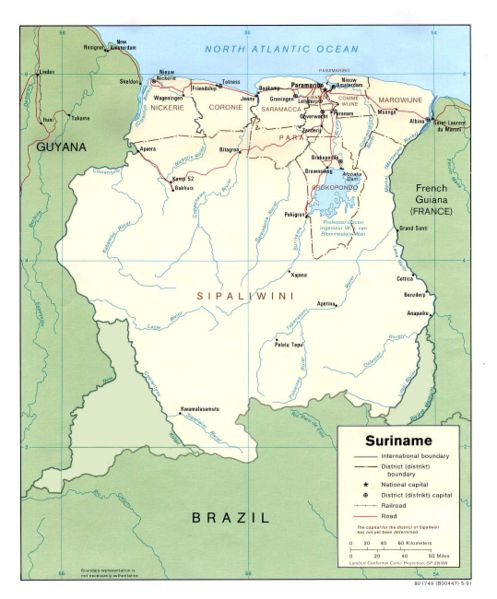
Map of Suriname with disputed territories in light green.

Suriname is situated between French Guiana to the east and Guyana to the west. The southern border is shared with Brazil and the northern border is the Atlantic coast. The southernmost borders with French Guiana and Guyana are disputed by Suriname along the Marowijne and Corantijn rivers, respectively, while a part of the disputed maritime boundary with Guyana was arbitrated by the Permanent Court of Arbitration convened under the rules set out in Annex VII of the United Nations Convention on the Law of the Sea on 20 September 2007.

=== Climate ===
Lying two to five degrees north of the equator, Suriname has a very hot and wet tropical climate, and temperatures do not vary much throughout the year. Average relative humidity is between 80% and 90%. Its average temperature ranges from 29 to 34 °C (84 to 93 °F). Due to the high humidity, actual temperatures are distorted and may therefore feel up to 6 °C (11 °F) hotter than the recorded temperature.

The year has two wet seasons, from April to August and from November to February. It also has two dry seasons, from August to November and February to April.

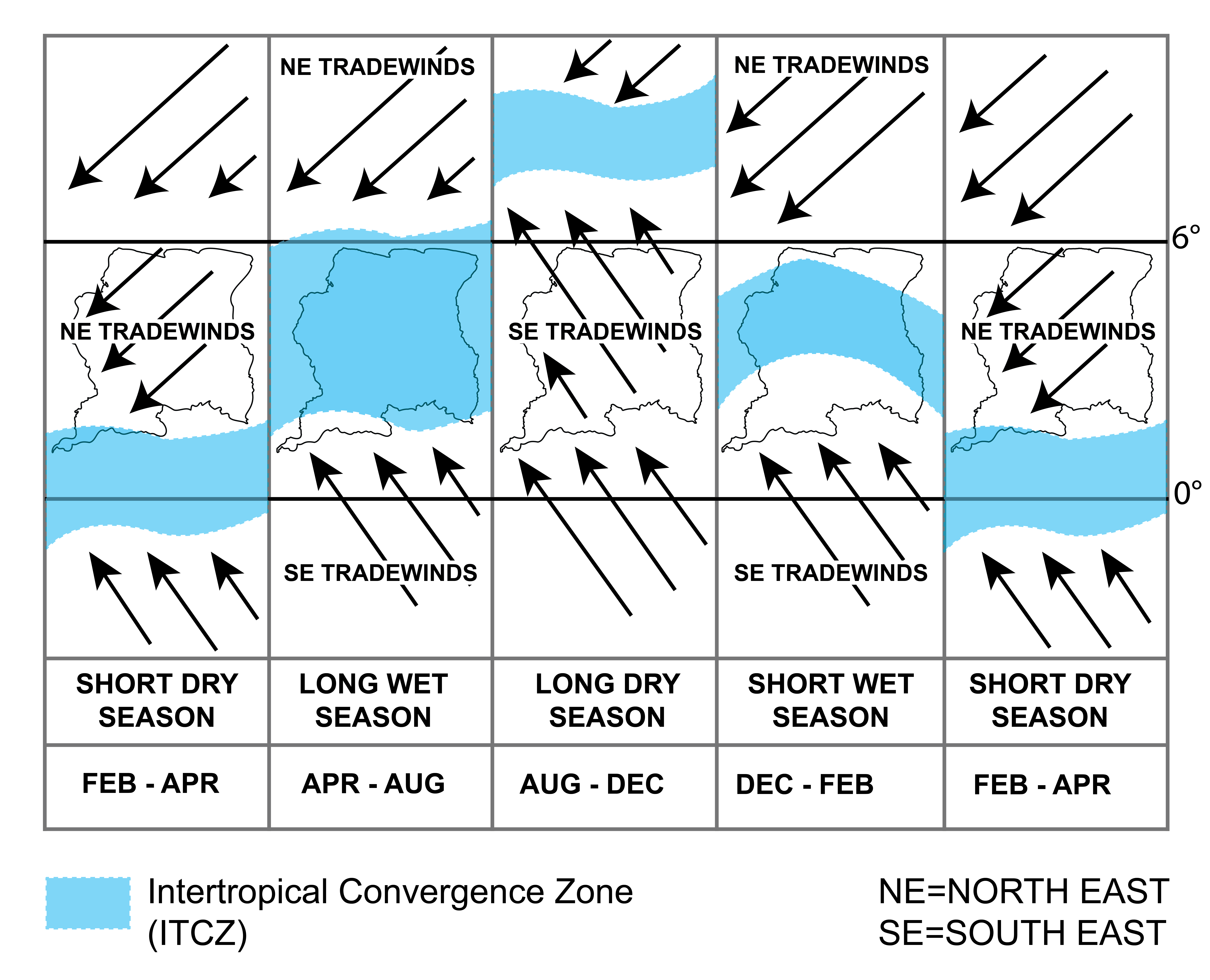
Seasons in Suriname

Climate change in Suriname is leading to warmer temperatures and more extreme weather events. As a relatively poor country, its contributions to global climate change have been limited. Because of the large forest cover, the country has been running a carbon negative economy since 2014.

=== Biodiversity and conservation ===
Share of forest area in total land area, top countries (2021). Suriname has the highest percentage of forest cover in the world.

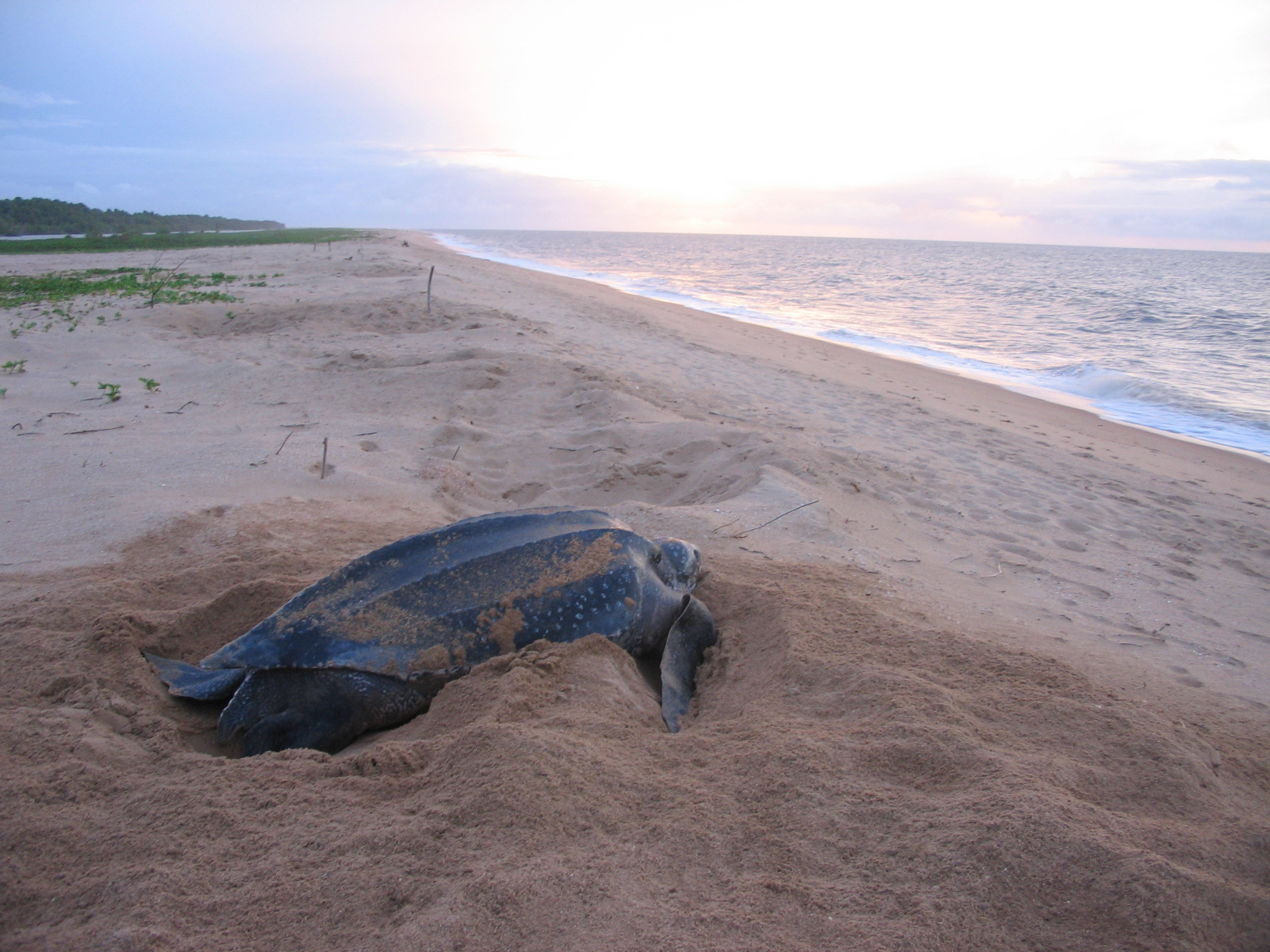
Leatherback sea turtle on the beach near the village of Galibi

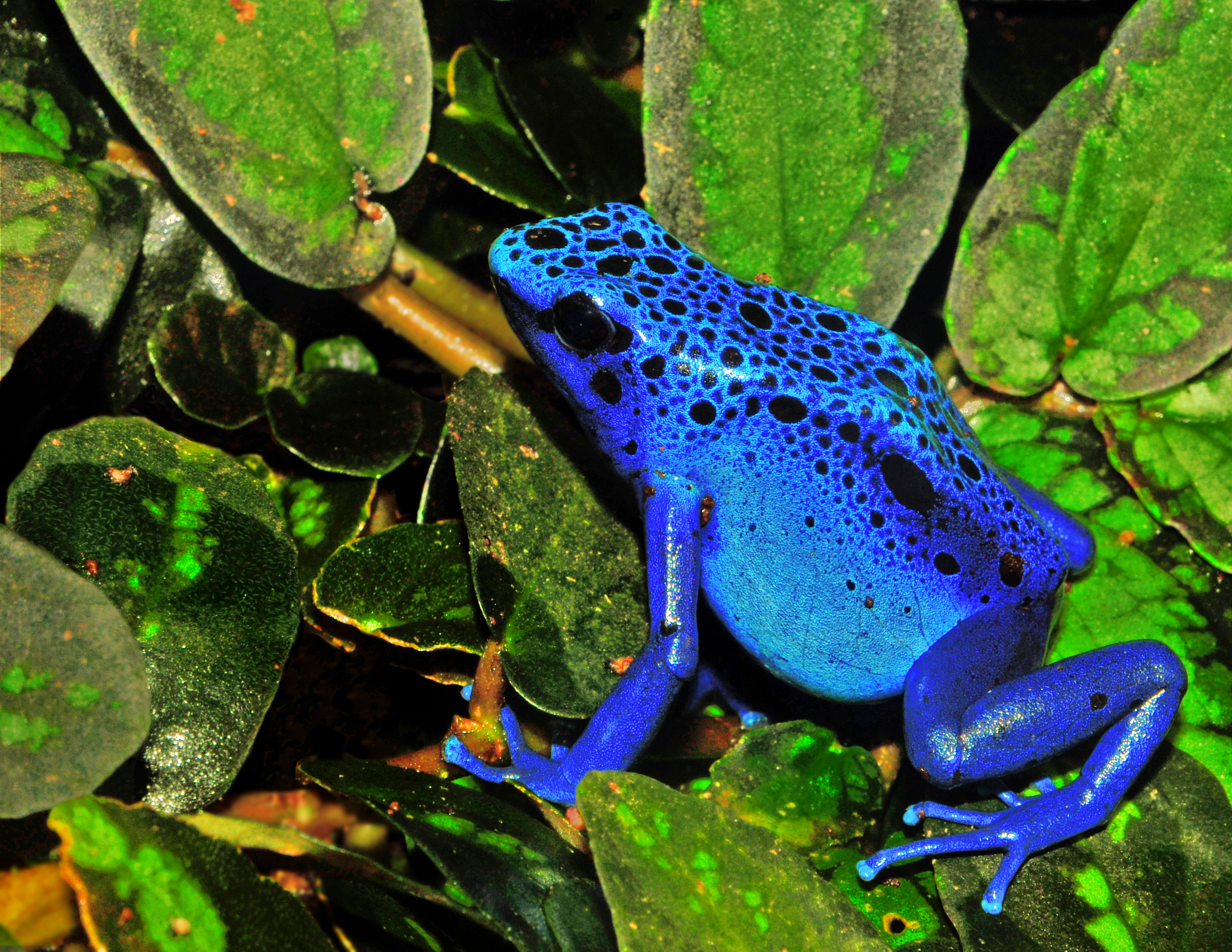
The blue poison dart frog is endemic to Suriname.

Due to the variety of habitats and temperatures, biodiversity in Suriname is considered high. In October 2013, 16 international scientists researching the ecosystems during a three-week expedition in Suriname's Upper Palumeu River Watershed catalogued 1,378 species and found 60—including six frogs, one snake, and 11 fish—that may be previously unknown species. According to the environmental non-profit Conservation International, which funded the expedition, Suriname's ample supply of fresh water is vital to the biodiversity and healthy ecosystems of the region.

Snakewood (Brosimum guianense), a tree, is native to this tropical region of the Americas. Customs in Suriname report that snakewood is often illegally exported to French Guiana, thought to be for the crafts industry.

On 21 March 2013, Suriname's REDD+ Readiness Preparation Proposal (R-PP 2013) was approved by the member countries of the Participants Committee of the Forest Carbon Partnership Facility (FCPF).

As in other parts of Central and South America, indigenous communities have increased their activism to protect their lands and preserve habitat. In March 2015, the "Trio and Wayana communities presented a declaration of cooperation to the National Assembly of Suriname that announces an indigenous conservation corridor spanning 72,000 square kilometers (27,799 square miles) of southern Suriname. The declaration, led by these indigenous communities and with the support of Conservation International (CI) and World Wildlife Fund (WWF) Guianas, comprises almost half of the total area of Suriname. This area includes large forests and is considered "essential for the country's climate resilience, freshwater security, and green development strategy."

The Central Suriname Nature Reserve has been designated a UNESCO World Heritage Site for its unspoiled forests and biodiversity. There are many national parks in the country, including Galibi National Reserve along the coast; Brownsberg Nature Park and Eilerts de Haan Nature Park in central Suriname; and the Sipaliwani Nature Reserve on the Brazilian border. In all, 16% of the country's land area is national parks and lakes, according to the UNEP World Conservation Monitoring Centre.

Suriname's extensive tree cover is vital to the country's efforts to mitigate climate change and maintain carbon negativity. (Note: Suriname has been carbon negative since at least 2014.)

However, extensive and apparently unchecked illegal gold mining with mercury continues to cause large-scale environmental degradation, especially along the Lawa and Maroni rivers, which form the border with French Guiana.

Conservation International Suriname (CI-Suriname), the Suriname country programme of Conservation International, is based in Paramaribo. Work linked to CI-Suriname includes support for protected-area planning and management in and around the Central Suriname Nature Reserve and nature-based coastal protection and mangrove rehabilitation at Weg naar Zee near Paramaribo.

== Government and politics ==
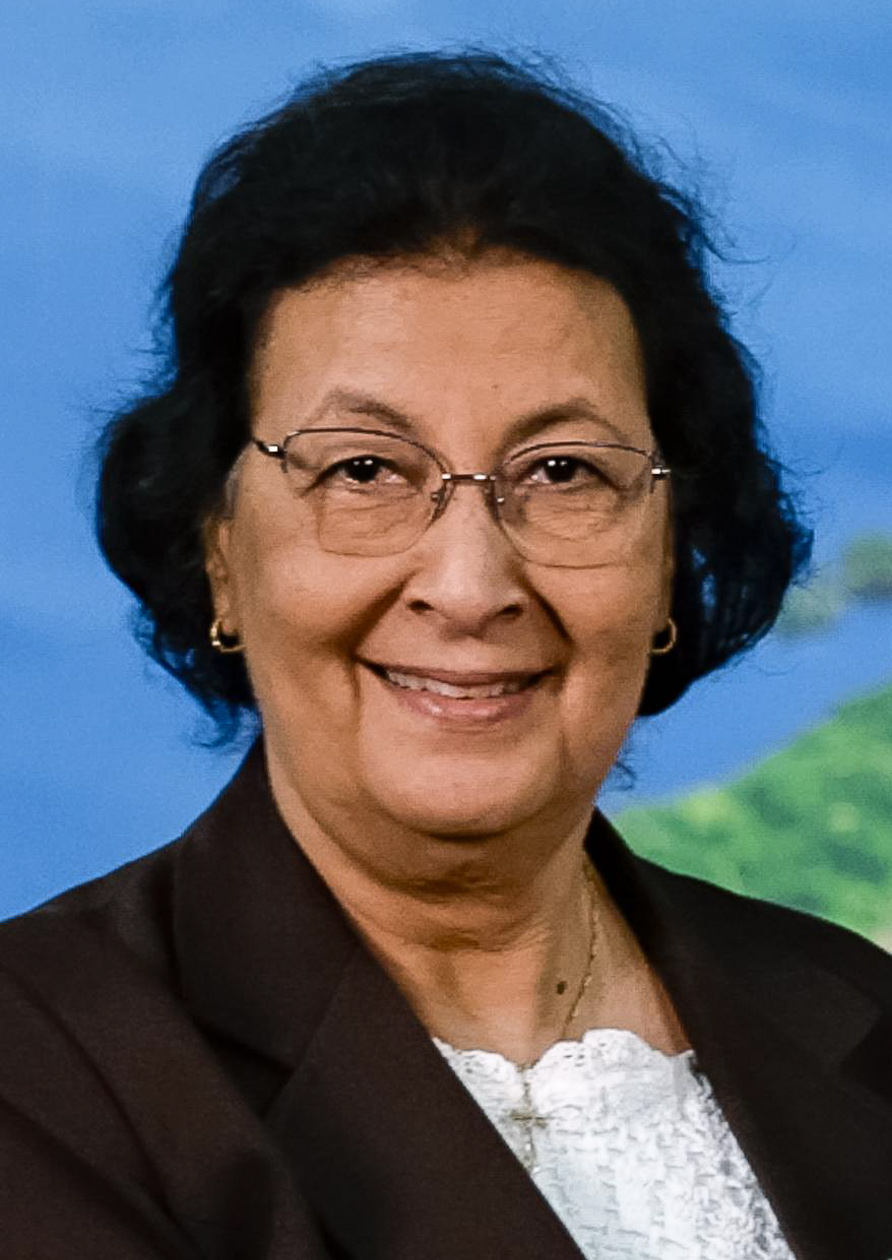
Jennifer Geerlings-Simons
President

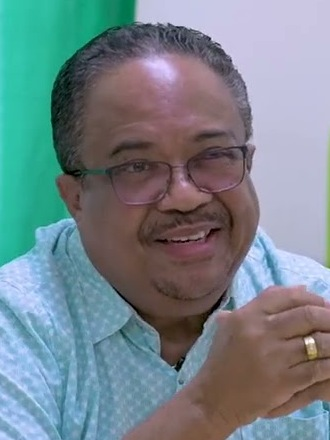
Gregory Rusland
Vice President

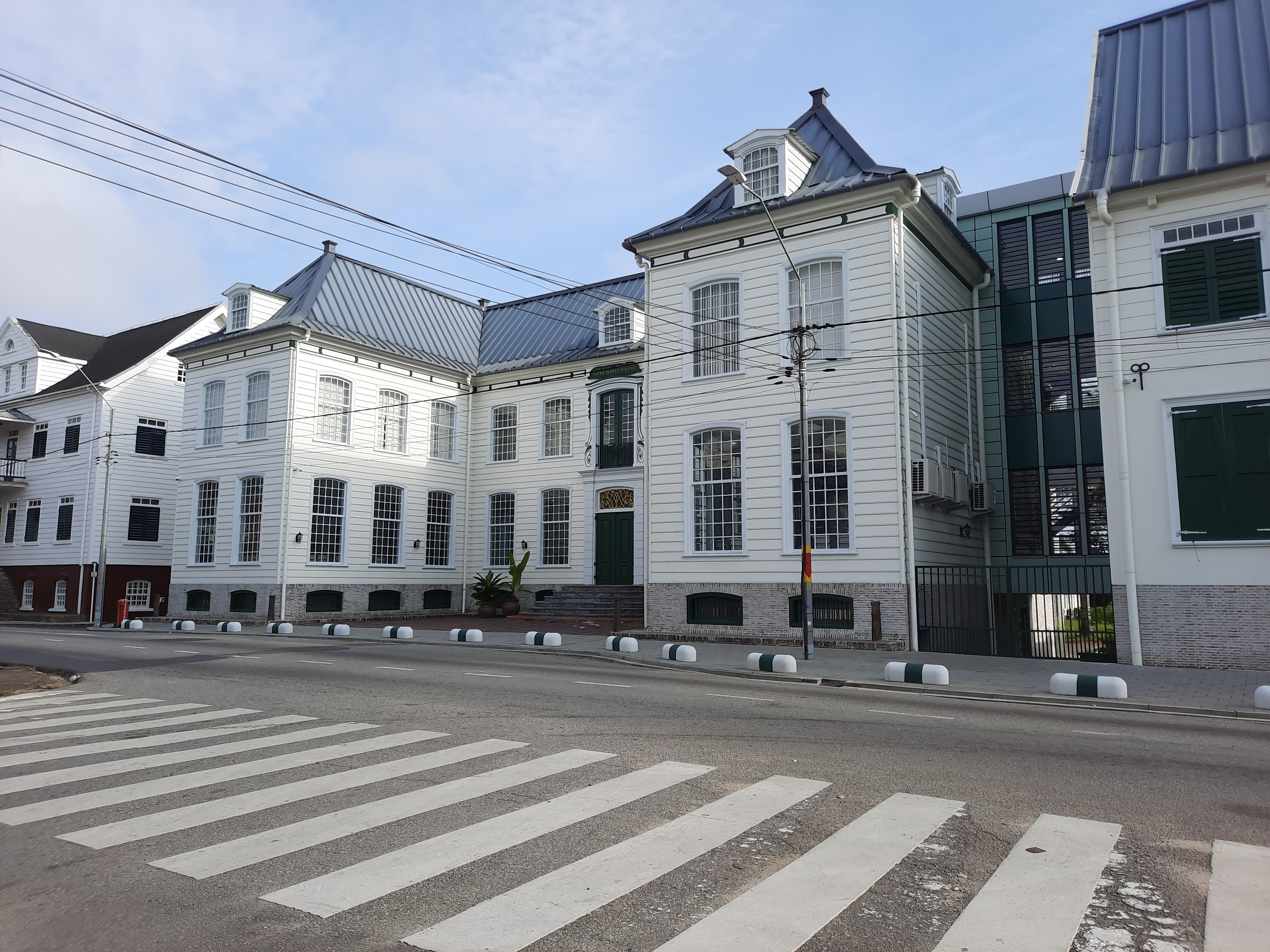
National Assembly of Suriname reconstructed building

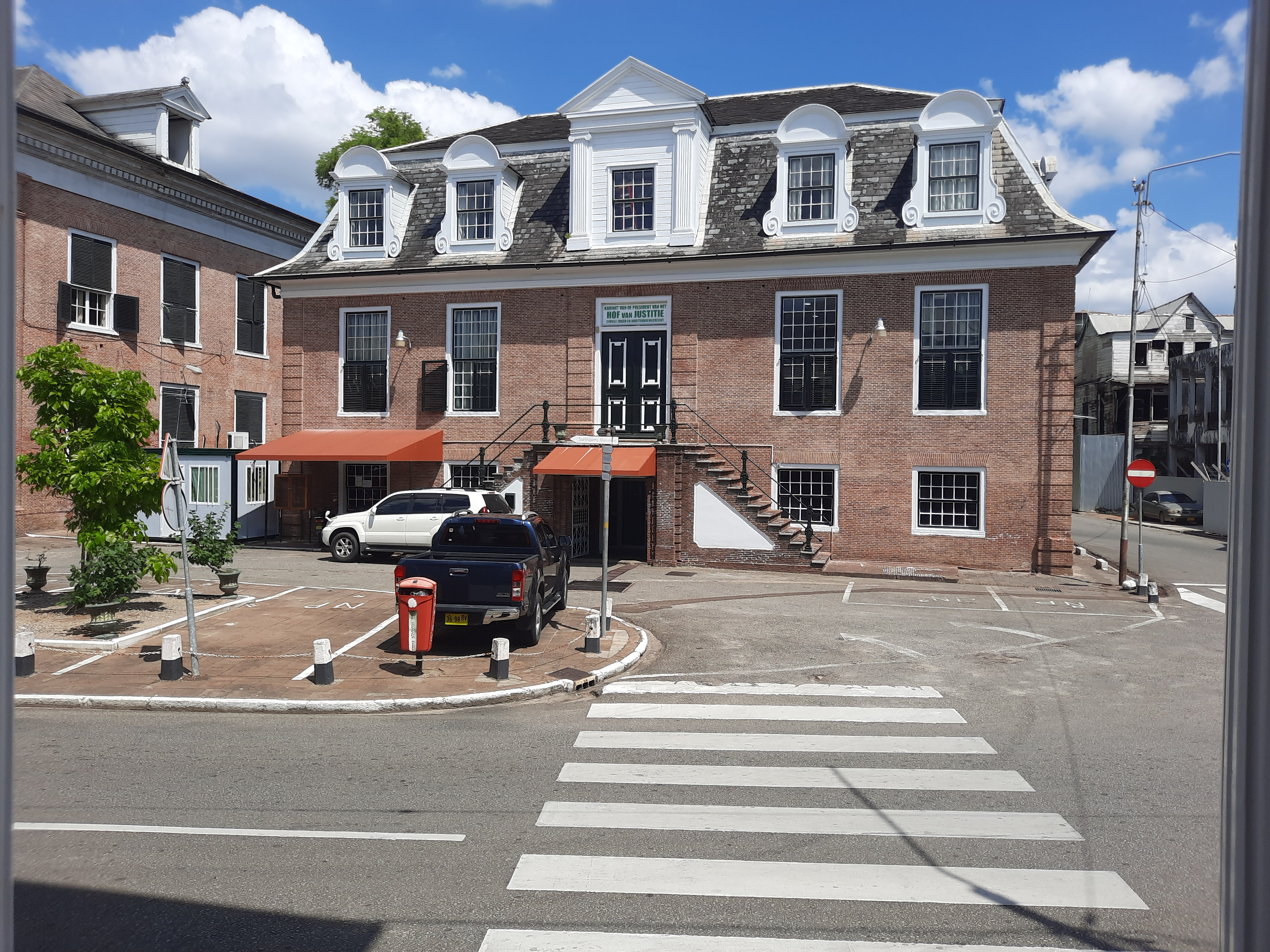
Court of Justice

The Republic of Suriname is a representative democratic republic with an installed assembly-independent system in place, based on the Constitution of 1987. The legislative branch of government consists of a 51-member unicameral National Assembly, simultaneously and popularly elected for a five-year term.

In the elections held on Tuesday 25 May 2010, the Megacombinatie won 23 of the National Assembly seats, followed by Nationale Front with 20 seats. A much smaller number, important for coalition-building, went to the "A-combinatie" and to the Volksalliantie. The parties held negotiations to form coalitions. Elections were held on 25 May 2015, and the National Assembly again elected Dési Bouterse as president.

The president of Suriname is elected for a five-year term by a two-thirds majority of the National Assembly. If at least two-thirds of the National Assembly cannot agree to vote for one presidential candidate, a People's Assembly is formed from all National Assembly delegates and regional and municipal representatives who were elected by popular vote in the most recent national election. The president may be elected by a majority of the People's Assembly called for the special election.

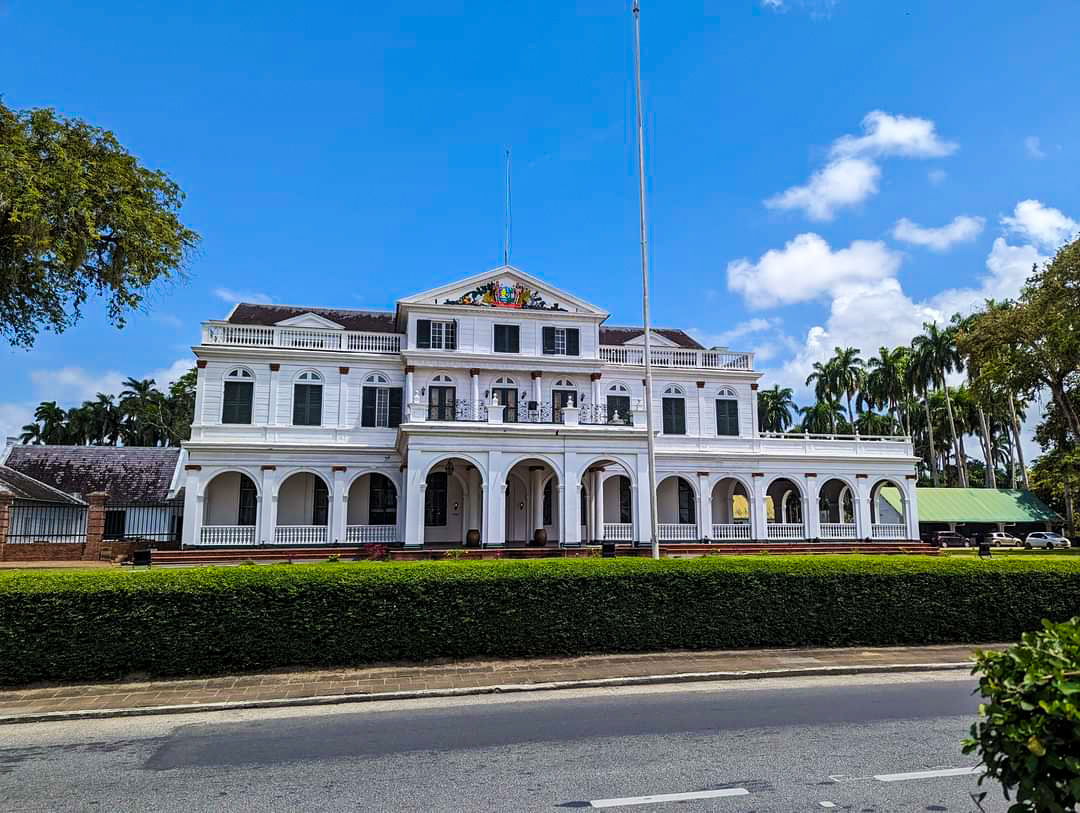
Presidential Palace of Suriname

As head of government, the president appoints a sixteen-minister cabinet. A vice president is normally elected for a five-year term at the same time as the president, by a simple majority in the National Assembly or People's Assembly. There is no constitutional provision for removal or replacement of the president, except in the case of resignation.

The judiciary is headed by the High Court of Justice of Suriname (Supreme Court). This court supervises the magistrate courts. Members are appointed for life by the president in consultation with the National Assembly, the State Advisory Council, and the National Order of Private Attorneys.

=== Foreign relations ===
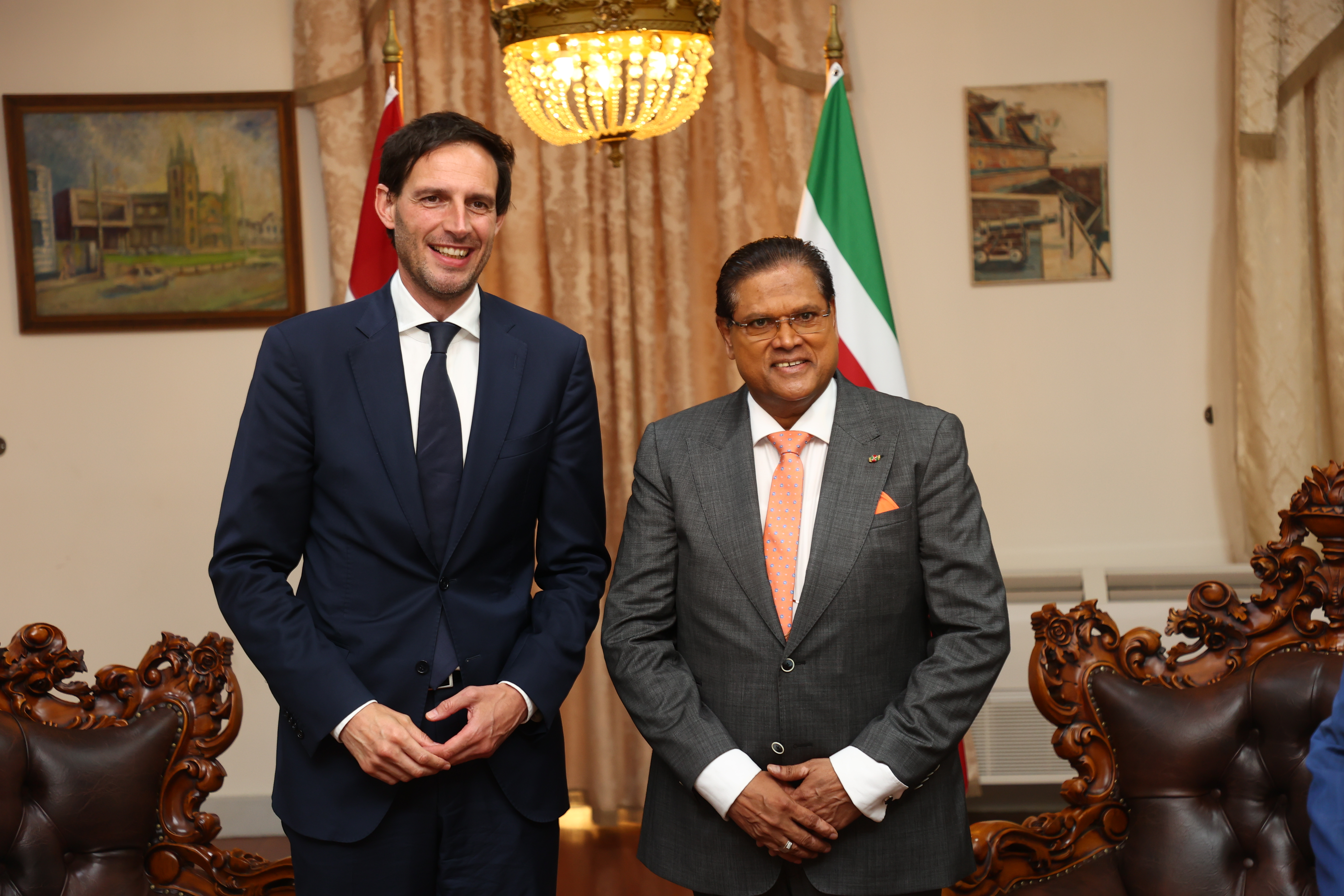
President Chan Santokhi (right) with Dutch politician Wopke Hoekstra, visiting to celebrate Ketikoti 2023 in Paramaribo

Diplomatic relations of Suriname

Due to Suriname's Dutch colonial history, Suriname had a long-standing special relationship with the Netherlands.

In 1999, Dési Bouterse was convicted and sentenced in absentia in the Netherlands to 11 years of imprisonment for drug trafficking. He was the main suspect in the court case concerning the December murders, the 1982 assassination of opponents of military rule in Fort Zeelandia, Paramaribo. He served as president between 2010 and 2020. These two cases still strain relations between the Netherlands and Suriname.

The Dutch government stated during that time that it would maintain limited contact with the president.

Bouterse was elected as president of Suriname in 2010. The Netherlands in July 2014 dropped Suriname as a member of its development program.

Since 1991, the United States has maintained positive relations with Suriname. The two countries work together through the Caribbean Basin Security Initiative (CBSI) and the U.S. President's Emergency Plan for AIDS Relief (PEPFAR). Suriname also receives military funding from the U.S. Department of Defense.

Suriname has been a member of the Forum of Small States (FOSS) since the group's founding in 1992.

European Union relations and cooperation with Suriname are carried out both on a bilateral and a regional basis. There are ongoing EU-Community of Latin American and Caribbean States (CELAC) and EU-CARIFORUM dialogues. Suriname is party to the Cotonou Agreement, the partnership agreement among the members of the African, Caribbean and Pacific Group of States and the European Union.

On 17 February 2005, the leaders of Barbados and Suriname signed the "Agreement for the deepening of bilateral cooperation between the Government of Barbados and the Government of the Republic of Suriname." On 23–24 April 2009, both nations formed a Joint Commission in Paramaribo, Suriname, to improve relations and to expand into various areas of cooperation. They held a second meeting toward this goal on 3–4 March 2011, in Dover, Barbados. Their representatives reviewed issues of agriculture, trade, investment, as well as international transport.

In the late 2000s, Suriname intensified development cooperation with other developing countries. China's South-South cooperation with Suriname has included a number of large-scale infrastructure projects, including port rehabilitation and road construction. Brazil signed agreements to cooperate with Suriname in education, health, agriculture, and energy production.

=== Military ===
The Armed Forces of Suriname have three branches: the Army, the Air Force, and the Navy. The president of the Republic is the Supreme Commander-in-Chief of the Armed Forces (Opperbevelhebber van de Strijdkrachten). The president is assisted by the minister of defence. Beneath the president and minister of defence is the commander of the armed forces (Bevelhebber van de Strijdkrachten). The military branches and regional military commands report to the commander.

After the creation of the Statute of the Kingdom of the Netherlands, the Royal Netherlands Army was entrusted with the defence of Suriname, while the defence of the Netherlands Antilles was the responsibility of the Royal Netherlands Navy. The army set up a separate Troepenmacht in Suriname (Forces in Suriname, TRIS). Upon independence in 1975, this force was turned into the Surinaamse Krijgsmacht (SKM):, Surinamese Armed Forces. After the 1980 overthrow of the government, the SKM was rebranded as the Nationaal Leger (NL), National Army.

In 1965, the Dutch and Americans used Suriname's Coronie site for multiple Nike Apache sounding rocket launches.

=== Administrative divisions ===
Districts of Suriname

The country is divided into ten administrative districts, each headed by a district commissioner appointed by the president, who also has the power of dismissal. Suriname is further subdivided into 62 resorts (ressorten).

	District	Capital	Area (km^{2})	Area (%)	Population (2012 census)	Population (%)	Pop. dens. (inhabitants/km^{2})
1	Nickerie	Nieuw Nickerie	5,353	3.3	34,233	6.3	6.4
2	Coronie	Totness	3,902	2.4	3,391	0.6	0.9
3	Saramacca	Groningen	3,636	2.2	17,480	3.2	4.8
4	Wanica	Lelydorp	443	0.3	118,222	21.8	266.9
5	Paramaribo	Paramaribo	182	0.1	240,924	44.5	1323.8
6	Commewijne	Nieuw-Amsterdam	2,353	1.4	31,420	5.8	13.4
7	Marowijne	Albina	4,627	2.8	18,294	3.4	4.0
8	Para	Onverwacht	5,393	3.3	24,700	4.6	4.6
9	Sipaliwini	none	130,567	79.7	37,065	6.8	0.3
10	Brokopondo	Brokopondo	7,364	4.5	15,909	2.9	2.2
	SURINAME	Paramaribo	163,820	100.0	541,638	100.0	3.3

== Economy ==
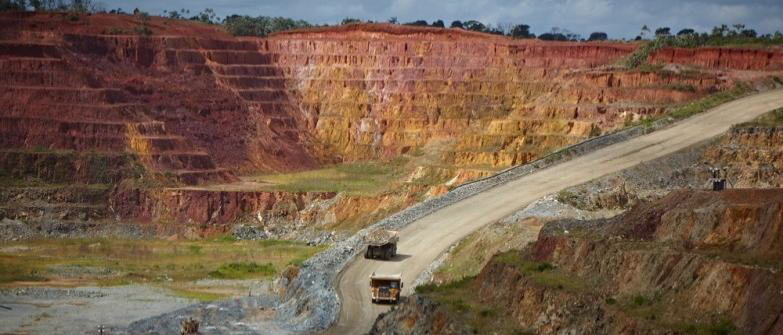
Rosebel gold mine

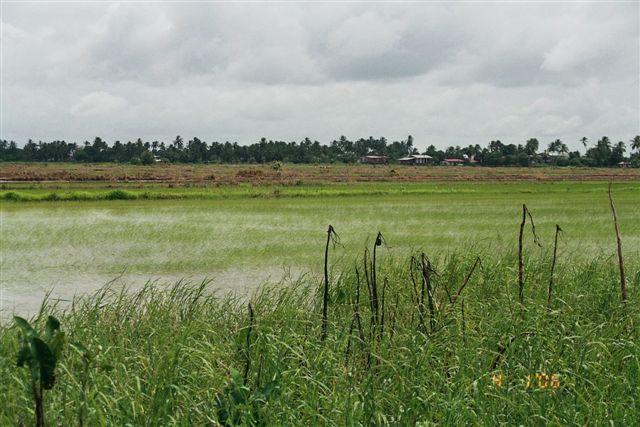
A rice field in Nickerie District

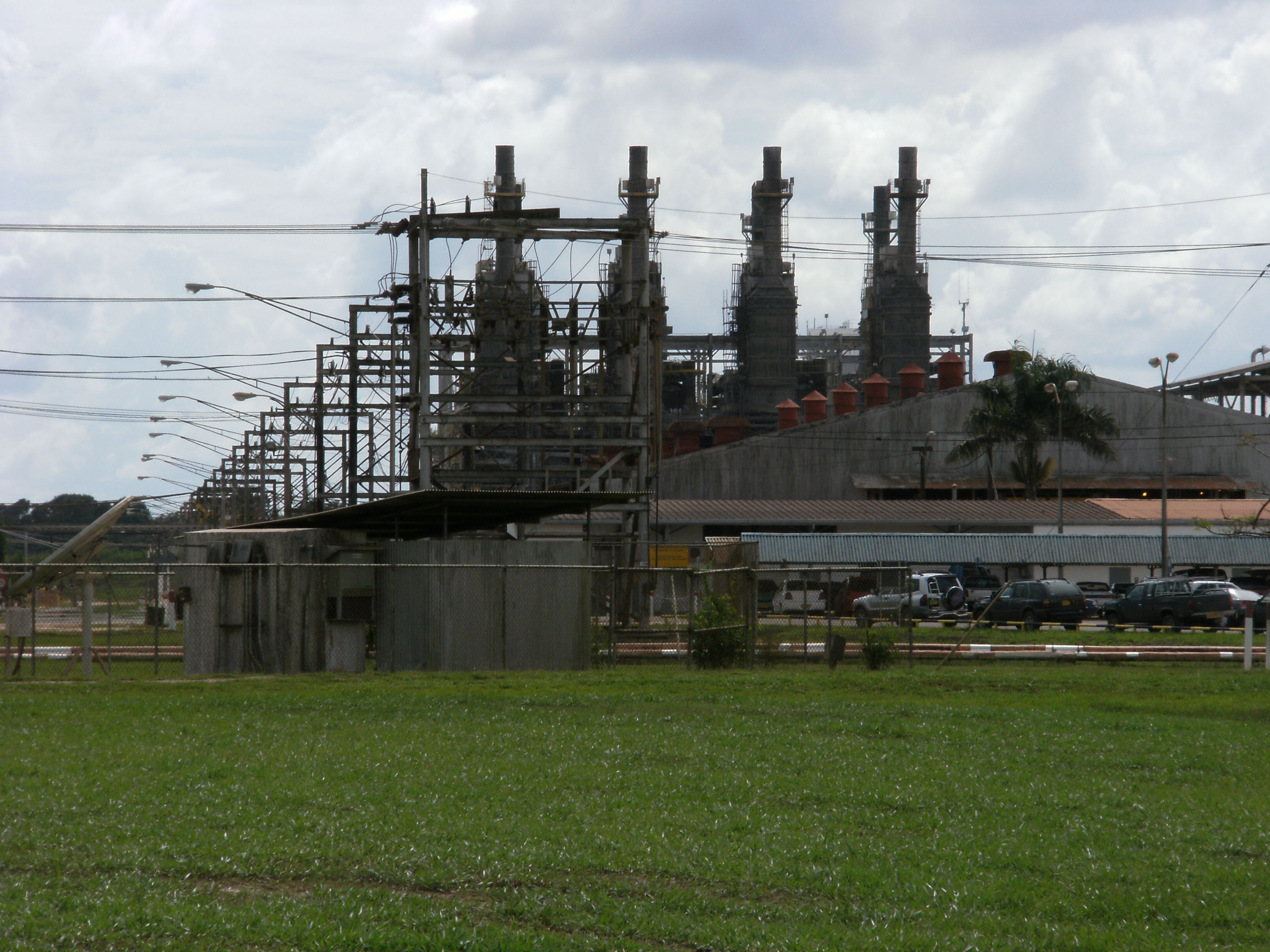
Suralco bauxite factory in Paranam

Suriname's democracy gained some strength after the turbulent 1990s, and its economy became more diversified and less dependent on Dutch financial assistance. Bauxite (aluminium ore) mining used to be a strong revenue source, since before the independence of the country up to 2015. Because Alcoa stopped all bauxite operations, the bauxite era in Suriname also ended.

The discovery, exploration and exploitation of oil and gold in modern times contributes substantially to Suriname's economic independence. Agriculture, especially rice and bananas, remains a strong component of the economy, and ecotourism is providing new economic opportunities. More than 93% of Suriname's landmass consists of unspoiled rainforest. However Suriname reported a net increase in forest area of 5 370 ha per year in 1990–2000 but a net loss of forest area of 16 400 ha per year in 2015–2025.

With the establishment of the Central Suriname Nature Reserve in 1998, Suriname signaled its commitment to the conservation of this precious resource. The Central Suriname Nature Reserve became a World Heritage Site in 2000.

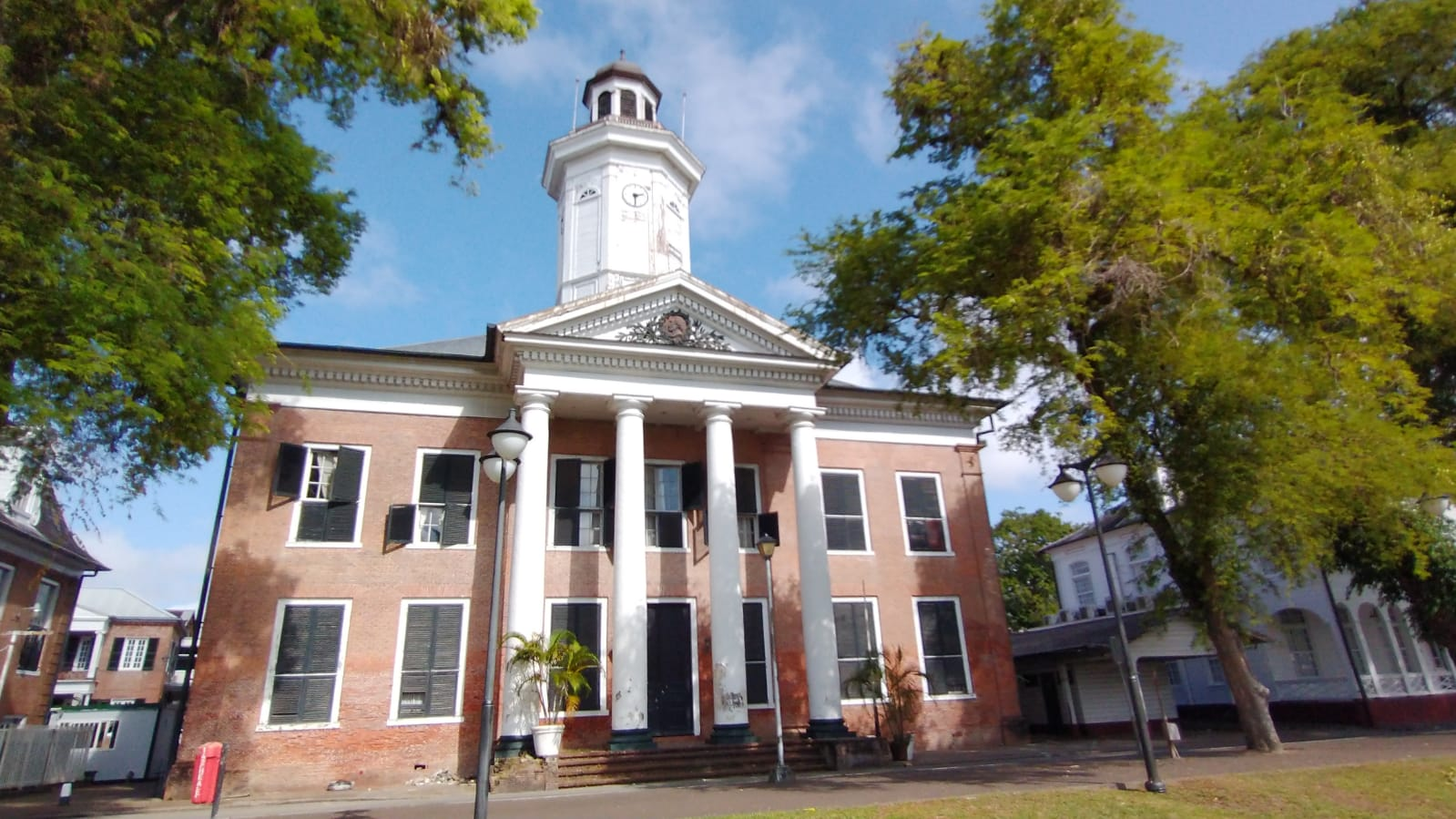
Ministry of Finance

The economy of Suriname was dominated by the bauxite industry, which accounted for more than 15% of GDP and 70% of export earnings up to 2015. Currently gold exports make up 60–80% of all exports earnings. In 2021 the gold industry accounted for 8.5% of the GDP. The share of large-scale mining in total gold production is 58% compared to 42% of small-scale mining. With an export value of US$1.83 billion in 2023, the gold sector makes an important contribution to the economy. The gold production of Suriname in 2015 is 30 tonnes.

The exploration and exploitation of oil adds substantially to the economy of Suriname at about 10% of the GDP. The national oil company, STAATSOLIE, is the motor behind Suriname's oil industry. Their core business is oil extraction and refining. In 2022 they made a revenue of US$840 million. In that year their contribution to the state treasury was US$320 million. In 2023 they made a revenue of US$722 million. The drop in revenue was because of the lower price for oil per barrel that year. Their contribution to the Surinamese state treasury was US$335 million.

Other main export products include rice, bananas, and shrimp. Suriname has recently started exploiting some of its sizeable oil and gold reserves. About a quarter of the people work in the agricultural sector. The Surinamese economy is very dependent on commerce, its main trade partners being Switzerland, China, the Netherlands, the United States, Canada, and Caribbean countries, mainly Trinidad and Tobago and the islands of the former Netherlands Antilles.

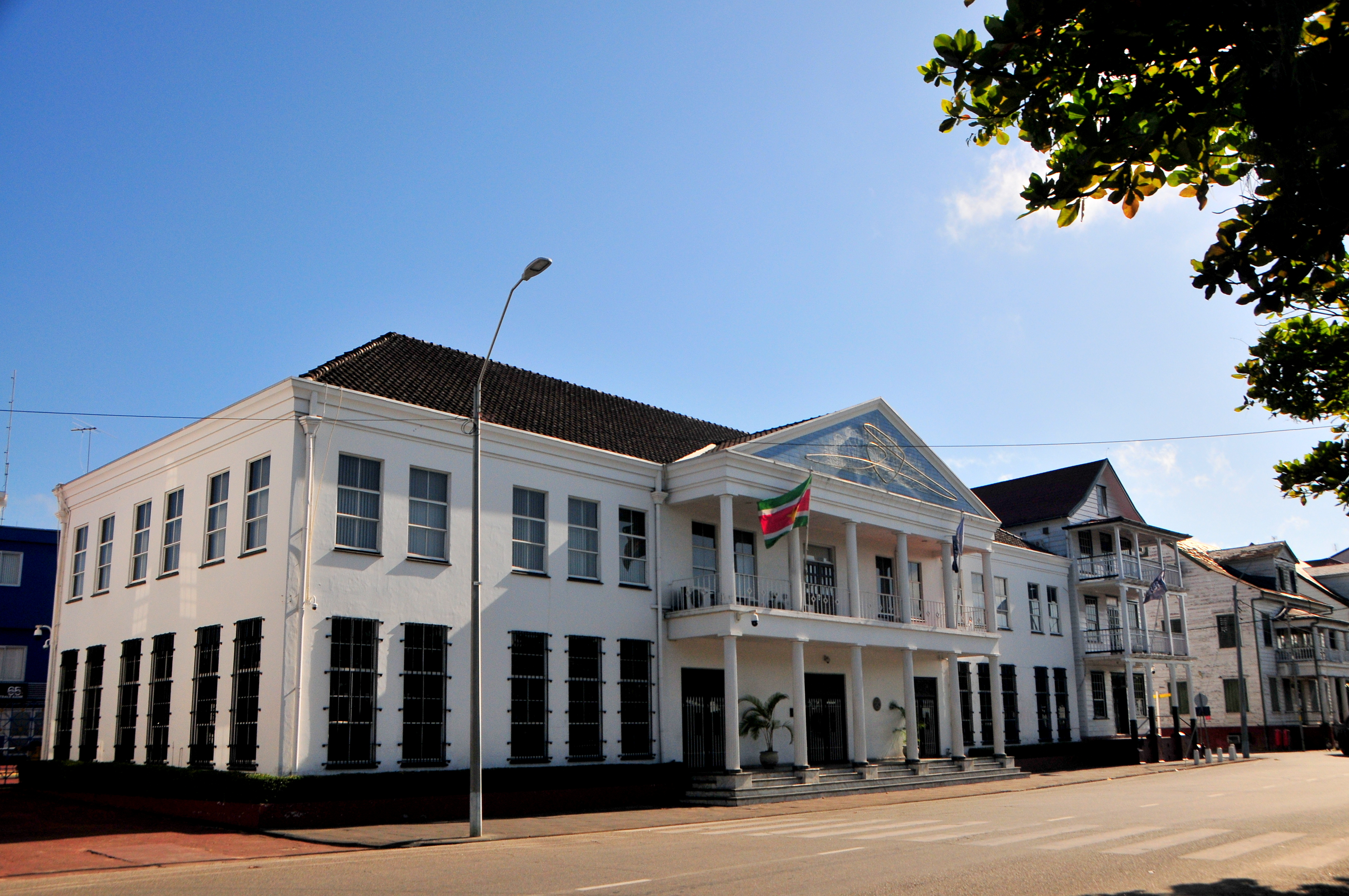
Central Bank of Suriname building in Paramaribo

After assuming power in the fall of 1996, the Wijdenbosch government ended the structural adjustment program of the previous government, claiming it was unfair to the poorer elements of society. Tax revenues fell as old taxes lapsed and the government failed to implement new tax alternatives. By the end of 1997, the allocation of new Dutch development funds was frozen as Surinamese Government relations with the Netherlands deteriorated. Economic growth slowed in 1998, with decline in the mining, construction, and utility sectors. Rampant government expenditures, poor tax collection, a bloated civil service, and reduced foreign aid in 1999 contributed to the fiscal deficit, estimated at 11% of GDP. The government sought to cover this deficit through monetary expansion, which led to a dramatic increase in inflation. It takes longer on average to register a new business in Suriname than virtually any other country in the world (694 days or about 99 weeks).

- GDP (2010 est.): US$4.794 billion.
- Annual growth rate real GDP (2010 est.): 3.5%.
- Per capita GDP (2010 est.): US$9,900.
- Inflation (2007): 6.4%.
- Natural resources: Bauxite, gold, oil, iron ore, other minerals; forests; hydroelectric potential; fish and shrimp.
- Agriculture: Products—rice, bananas, timber, palm kernels, coconuts, peanuts, citrus fruits, and forest products.
- Industry: Types—alumina, oil, gold, fish, shrimp, lumber.
- Trade:
  - Exports (2012): US$2.563 billion: alumina, gold, crude oil, lumber, shrimp and fish, rice, bananas. Major consumers: US 26.1%, Belgium 17.6%, UAE 12.1%, Canada 10.4%, Guyana 6.5%, France 5.6%, Barbados 4.7%.
  - Imports (2012): US$1.782 billion: capital equipment, petroleum, foodstuffs, cotton, consumer goods. Major suppliers: US 25.8%, Netherlands 15.8%, China 9.8%, UAE 7.9%, Antigua and Barbuda 7.3%, Netherlands Antilles 5.4%, Japan 4.2%.

=== Tourism ===
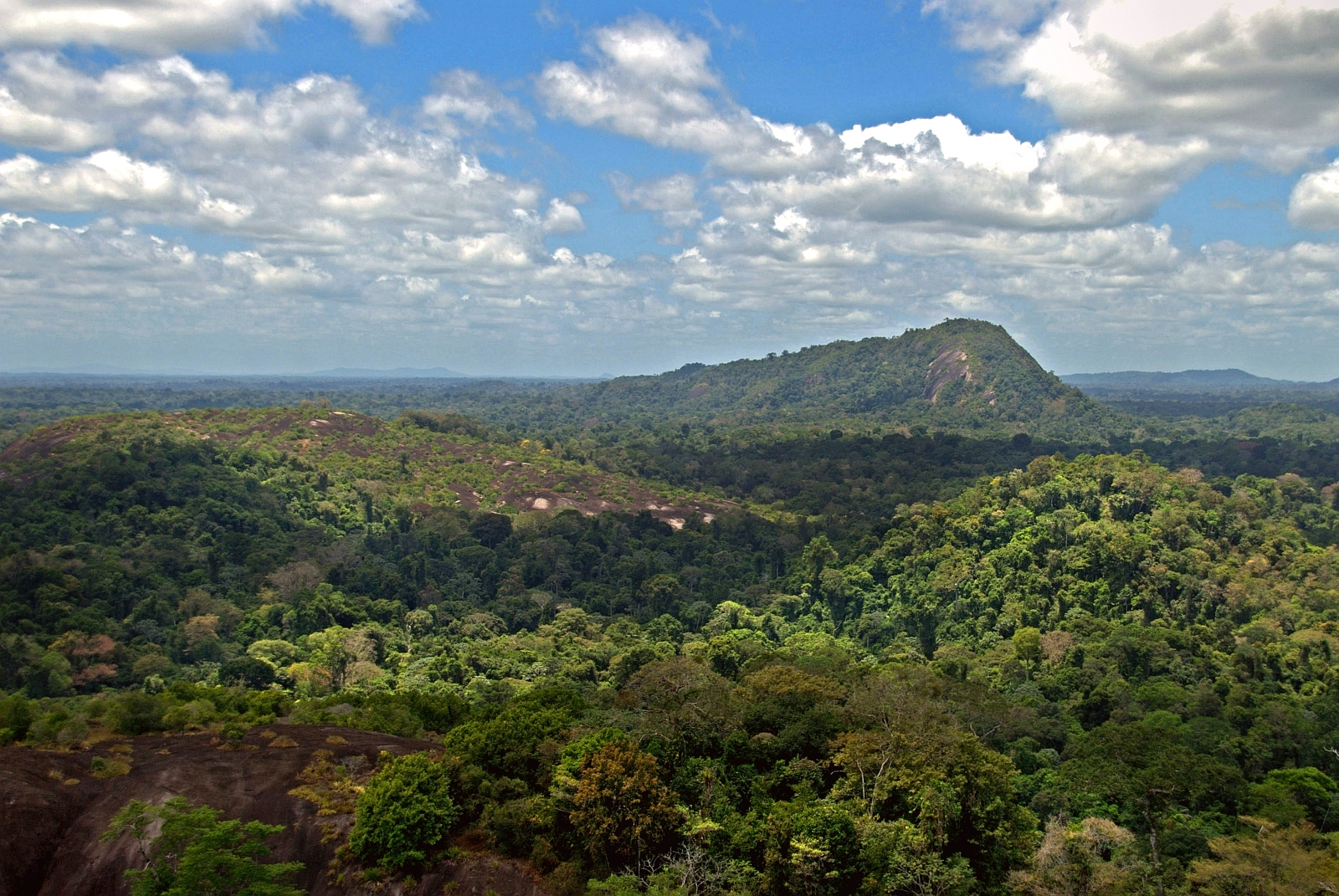
Central Suriname Nature Reserve seen from the Voltzberg

Most tourists visit Suriname for the biodiversity of the Amazonian rain forests in the south of the country, which are noted for their flora and fauna. The Central Suriname Nature Reserve is the biggest and one of the most popular reserves, along with the Brownsberg Nature Park which overlooks the Brokopondo Reservoir, one of the largest human-made lakes in the world. In 2008, the Berg en Dal Eco & Cultural Resort opened in Brokopondo. Tonka Island in the reservoir is home to a rustic eco-tourism project run by the Saramaccaner Maroons. Pangi wraps and bowls made of calabashes are the two main products manufactured for tourists. The Maroons have learned that colorful and ornate pangis are popular with tourists. [1] Other popular decorative souvenirs are hand-carved purple-hardwood made into bowls, plates, canes, wooden boxes, and wall decors.

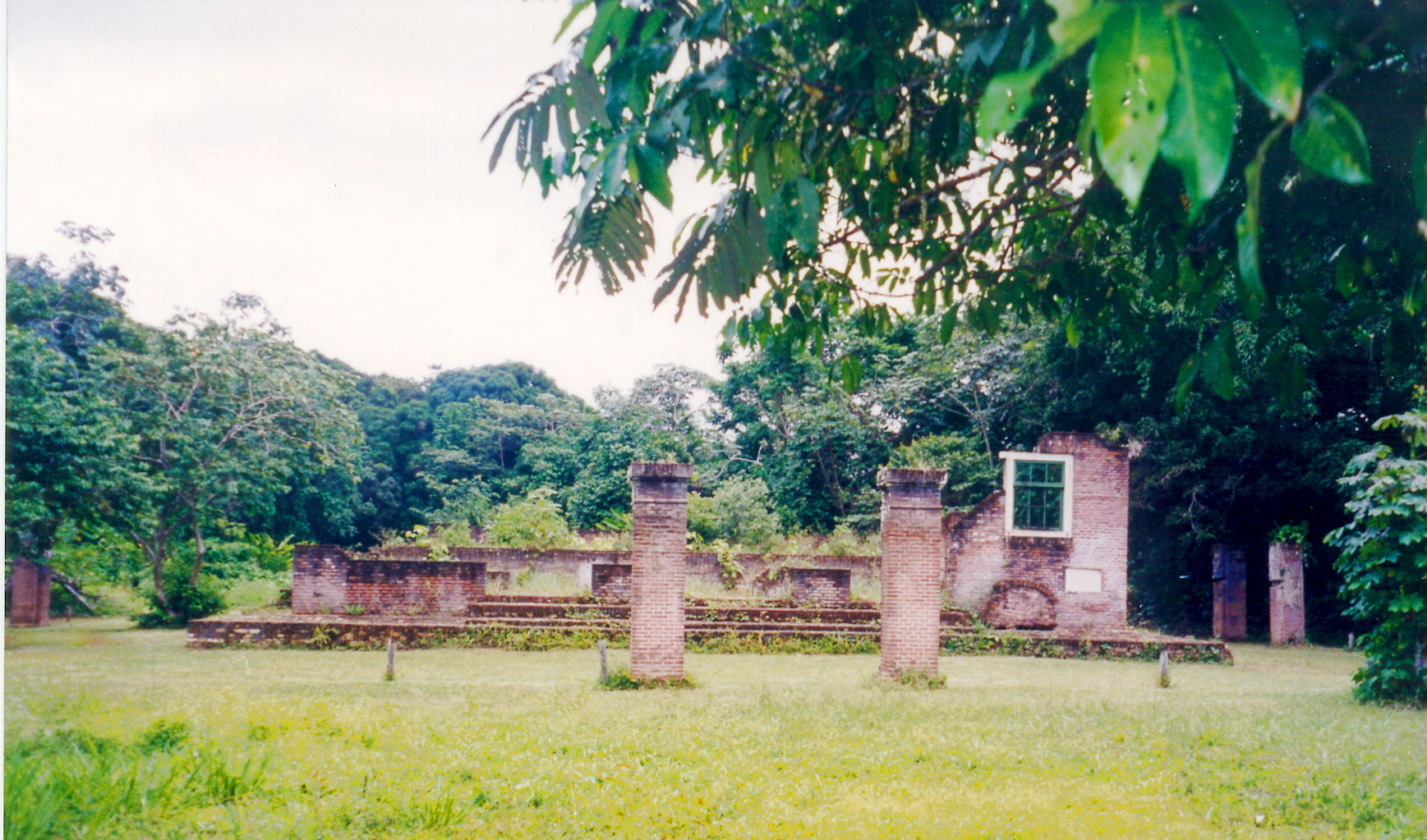
The remains of the synagogue on the Jodensavanne

There are also many waterfalls throughout the country. Raleighvallen, or Raleigh Falls, is a 56,000-hectare (140,000-acre) nature reserve on the Coppename River, rich in bird life. Also are the Blanche Marie Falls on the Nickerie River and the Wonotobo Falls. Tafelberg Mountain in the centre of the country is surrounded by its own reserve – the Tafelberg Nature Reserve – around the source of the Saramacca River, as is the Voltzberg Nature Reserve further north on the Coppename River at Raleighvallen. In the interior are many Maroon and Amerindian villages, many of which have their own reserves that are generally open to visitors.

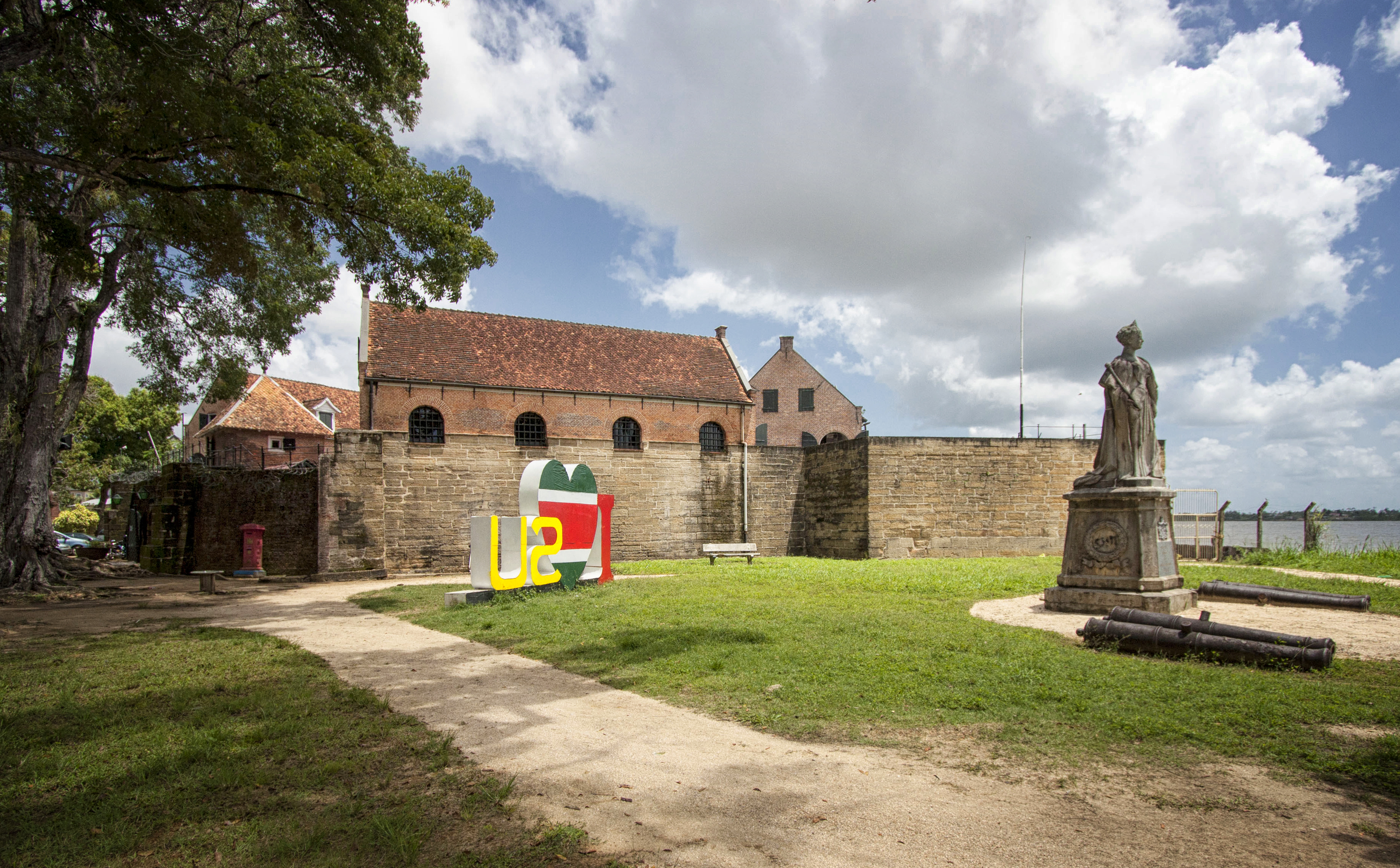
Fort Zeelandia in Paramaribo

Suriname is one of the few countries in the world where at least one of each biome that the state possesses has been declared a wildlife reserve. Around 30% of the total land area of Suriname is protected by law as reserves. Other attractions include plantations such as Laarwijk, which is situated along the Suriname River. This plantation can be reached only by boat via Domburg, in the north central Wanica District of Suriname.

Crime rates continue to rise in Paramaribo and armed robberies are not uncommon. According to the current U.S. Department of State Travel Advisory at the date of the 2025 report's publication, Suriname has been assessed as Level 1: exercise normal precautions.

==== Landmarks ====
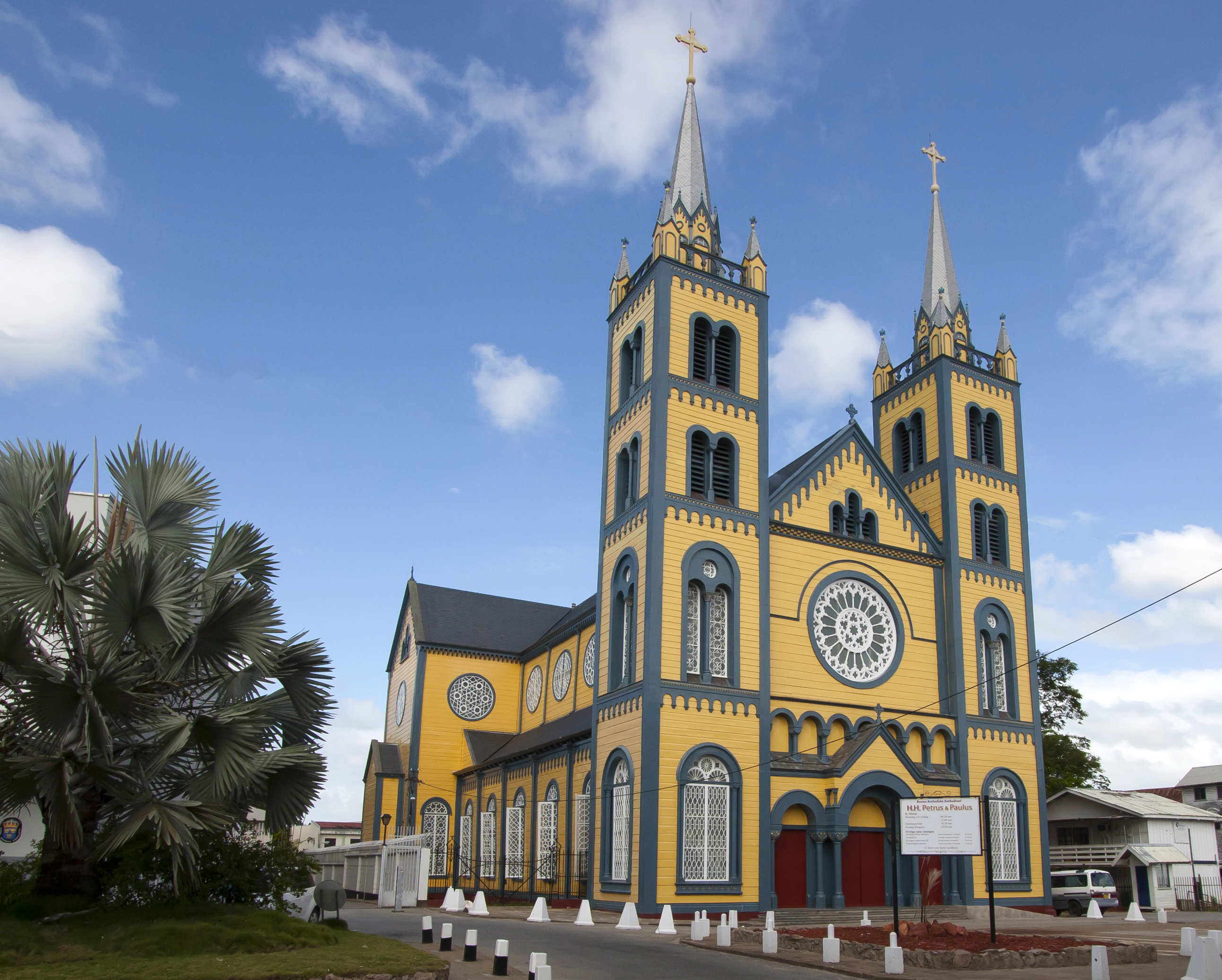
The Cathedral of St. Peter and Paul in Paramaribo

The Jules Wijdenbosch Bridge is a bridge over the river Suriname between Paramaribo and Meerzorg in the Commewijne district. The bridge was built during the tenure of President Jules Albert Wijdenbosch (1996–2000) and was completed in 2000. The bridge is 52 metres (171 ft) high, and 1,504 metres (4,934 ft) long. It connects Paramaribo with Commewijne, a connection which previously could only be made by ferry. The purpose of the bridge was to facilitate and promote the development of the eastern part of Suriname. The bridge consists of two lanes (one lane each way).

The construction of the Sts. Peter and Paul Cathedral started on 13 January 1883. Before it became a cathedral it was a theatre. The theatre was built in 1809 and burned down in 1820.

Suriname is one of the few countries in the world where a synagogue is located next to a mosque. The two buildings are located next to each other in the centre of Paramaribo and have been known to share a parking facility during their respective religious rites, should they happen to coincide with one another.

A relatively new landmark is the Hindu Arya Diwaker temple in the Johan Adolf Pengelstraat in Wanica, Paramaribo, which was inaugurated in 2001. A special characteristic of the temple is that it does not have images of the Hindu divinities, as they are forbidden in the Arya Samaj, the Hindu movement to which the people who built the temple belong. Instead, the building is covered by many texts derived from the Vedas and other Hindu scriptures. The architecture makes the temple a tourist attraction.

=== Transportation ===
==== Road ====
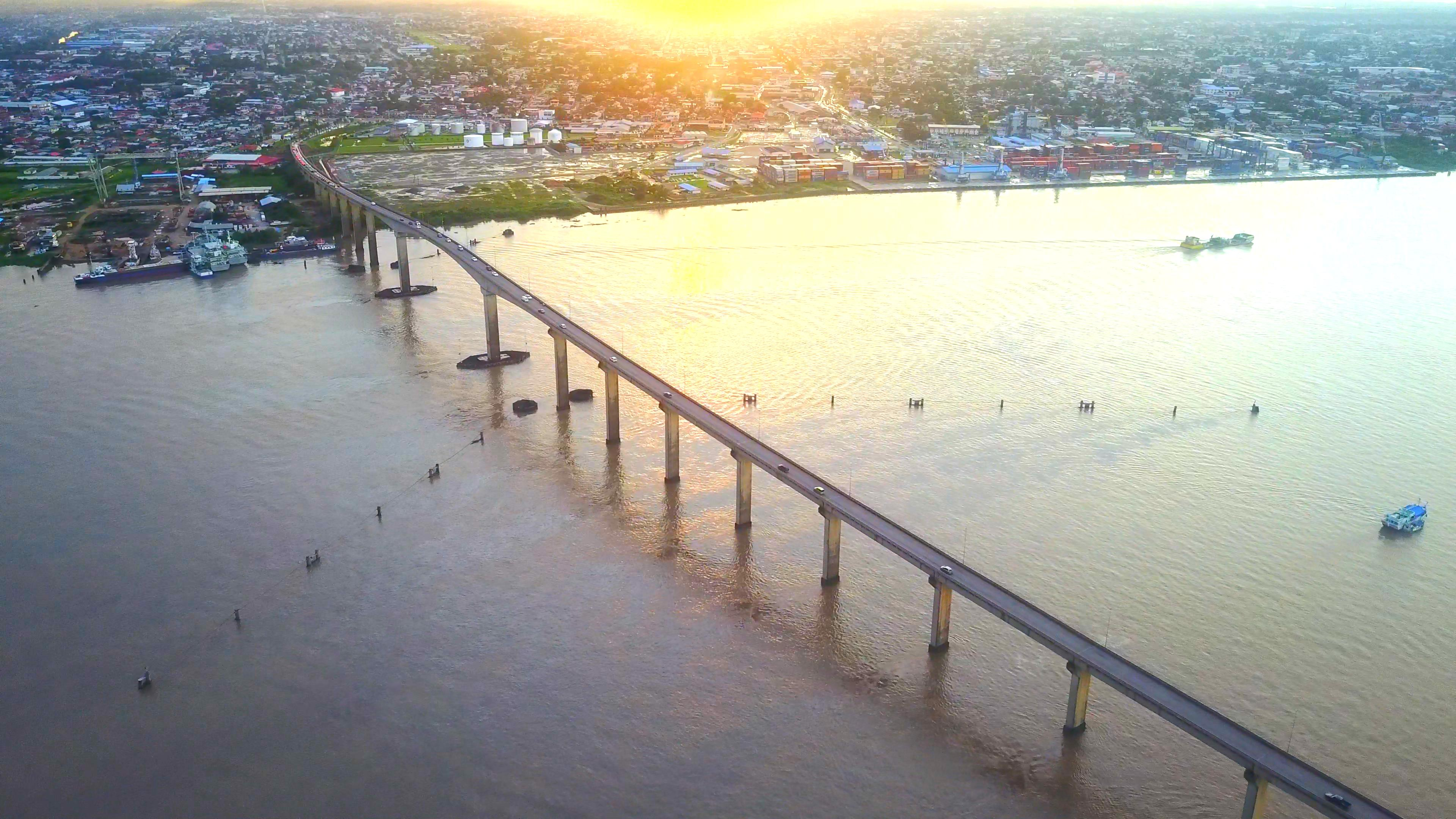
Jules Wijdenbosch Bridge over the Suriname River

Suriname, along with neighbouring Guyana, is one of only two countries on the mainland South American continent that drive on the left, although many vehicles are left-hand-drive as well as right-hand-drive. One explanation for this practice is that at the time of its colonisation of Suriname, the Netherlands itself used left-hand traffic, also introducing the practice in the Dutch East Indies, now Indonesia. Another is that Suriname was first colonised by the British, and for practical reasons, this was not changed when it came under Dutch administration.

Although the Netherlands converted to driving to the right at the end of the 18th century, Suriname did not. As of 2003, Suriname had 4303 km (2674 miles) of roads, of which 1119 km (695 miles) are paved.

==== Air ====
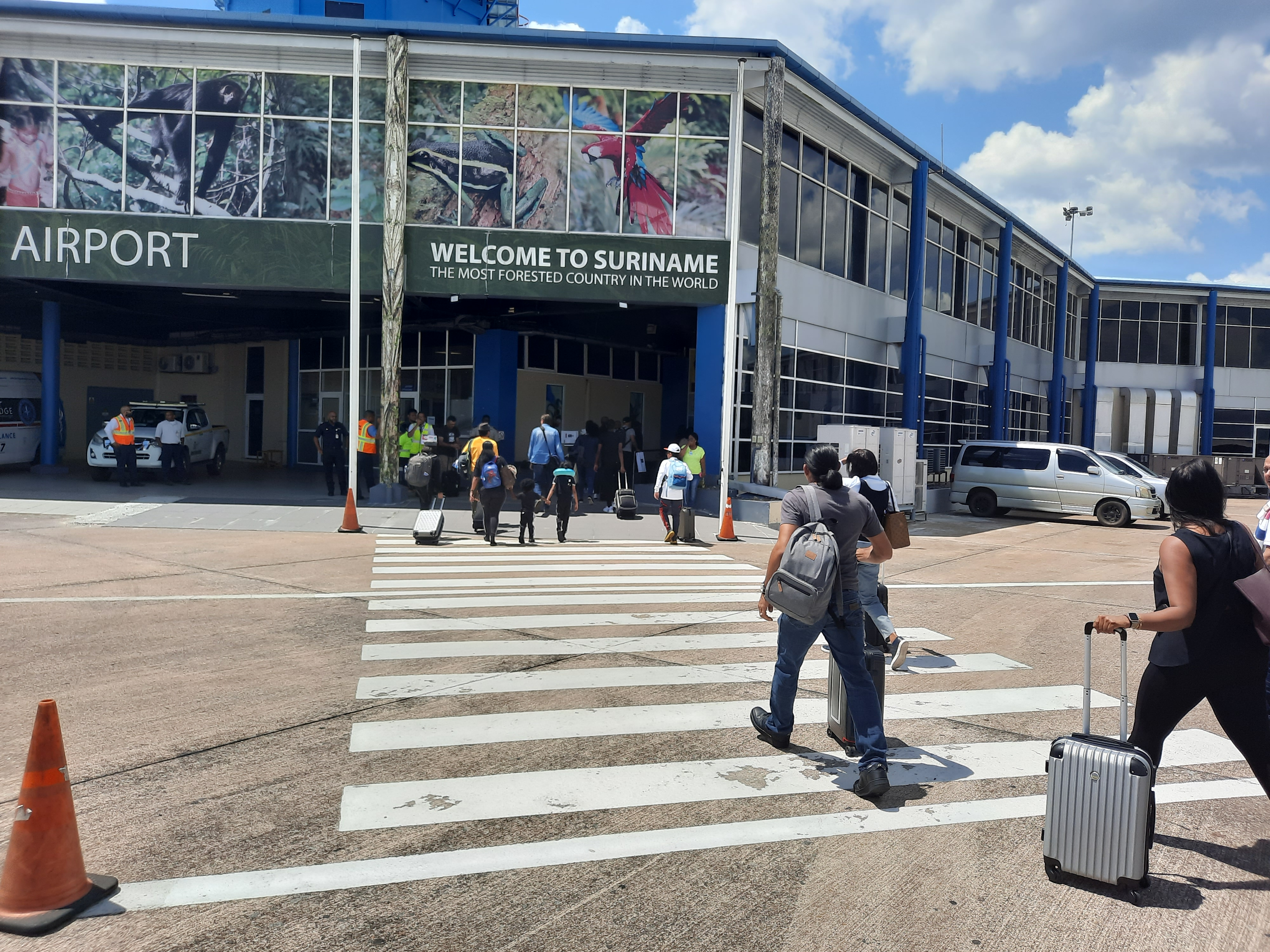
Johan Adolf Pengel International Airport

The country has 55 mostly small airports, of which only six are paved. The only international airport that supports large jet aircraft is Johan Adolf Pengel International Airport.

Airlines with departures from Suriname:

- American Airlines
- Blue Wing Airlines
- Gum Air
- Fly All Ways
- Surinam Airways (SLM)

Airlines with arrivals in Suriname:

- Caribbean Airlines (Trinidad and Tobago)
- KLM (Netherlands)
- Gol Transportes Aéreos (Brazil)
- Copa Airlines (Panama)
- Tui (Netherlands)
- Fly All Ways (Curaçao), Cuba (Havana), (Santiago de Cuba)
- Surinam Airways (SLM) (Aruba), Brazil (Belém), (Curaçao), Guyana (Georgetown), Netherlands (Amsterdam), Trinidad and Tobago (Port of Spain), and the United States (Miami).

Other national companies with an air operator certification:

- Aero Club Suriname (ACS) – General Aviation Aeroclub
- Coronie Aero Farmers (CAF) – Agriculture Cropdusting
- Eagle Air Services (EAS) – Agriculture Cropdusting
- ERK Farms (ERK) – Agriculture Cropdusting
- Overeem Air Service (OAS) – General Aviation Charters
- Pegasus Air Service (PAS) – Helicopter Charters
- Suriname Air Force / Surinaamse Luchtmacht (SAF / LUMA) – Military Aviation Surinam Air Force
- Surinam Sky Farmers (SSF) – Agriculture Cropdusting
- Surinaamse Medische Zendings Vliegdienst (MAF – Mission Aviation Fellowship) – General Aviation Missionary
- Vortex Aviation Suriname (VAS) – General Aviation Maintenance & Flightschool

== Demographics ==
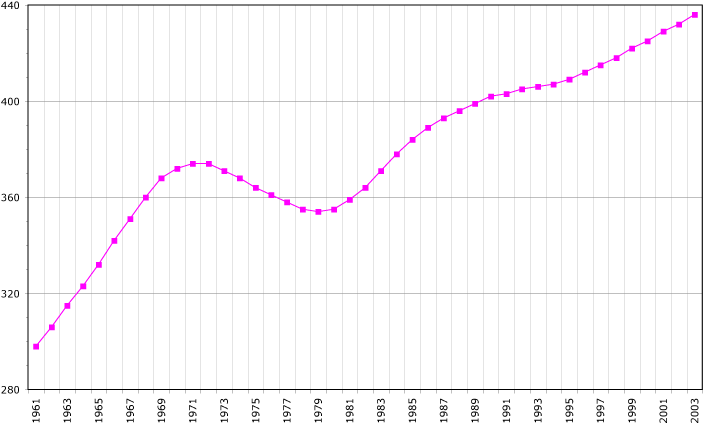
The population of Suriname from 1961 to 2003, in units of 1000. The slowdown and decline in population growth ~1969–1985 reflects a mass migration to the Netherlands and French Guiana.

In 2022, Suriname had a population of roughly 624,900 according to estimates by the United Nations. This compares to 541,638 inhabitants from the 2012 census. The Surinamese populace is characterized by high levels of diversity, wherein no particular demographic group constitutes a majority. This is a legacy of centuries of Dutch rule, which entailed successive periods of forced, contracted, or voluntary migration by various nationalities and ethnic groups from around the world.

=== Largest cities ===
The national capital, Paramaribo, is by far the dominant urban area, accounting for nearly half of Suriname's population and most of its urban residents. Indeed, its population is greater than the next nine largest cities combined. Most municipalities are located within the capital's metropolitan area, or along the densely populated coastline; about 90% of the population lives in Paramaribo or on the coast.

Largest cities or towns in Suriname
Rank	Name	District	Pop.
1	Paramaribo	Paramaribo	223 757
2	Lelydorp	Wanica	18 223
3	Nieuw Nickerie	Nickerie	13 143
4	Moengo	Marowijne	7 074
5	Nieuw Amsterdam	Commewijne	4 935
6	Mariënburg	Commewijne	4 427
7	Wageningen	Nickerie	4 145
8	Albina	Marowijne	3 985
9	Groningen	Saramacca	3 216
10	Brownsweg	Brokopondo	2 696

=== Ethnicity ===
Ethnic groups of Suriname
Ethnic groups	percent
Indian	27.4%
Maroon	21.7%
Creole	15.7%
Javanese	13.7%
Mixed	13.4%
Amerindian	3.8%
Chinese	1.5%
White	0.3%
Other	2.5%

Ethnic groups of Suriname (right) and Paramaribo (left) Creoles Hindus Maroons Javanese Indigenous

The largest ethnic group are Asian Surinamese (about 43%), with the largest subgroup being Indo-Surinamese, locally referred to as Hindustanis, who form over a quarter of the population (27.4%). The vast majority are descendants of 19th-century indentured workers from Northern India and Southern Nepal, hailing mostly from the areas of modern Bihar, Jharkhand and Eastern Uttar Pradesh, and also the Bengal region that consists of modern West Bengal and Bangladesh. If counted as one ethnic group, the Afro-Surinamese are the second largest community, at around 37.4%; however, they are usually divided into two cultural/ethnic groups: the Creoles and the Maroons. Surinamese Maroons, whose ancestors are mostly runaway slaves that fled to the interior, comprise 21.7% of the population. They are divided into six tribes: Ndyuka (Aucans), Saramaccans, Paramaccans, Kwinti, Aluku (Boni) and Matawai. Surinamese Creoles, mixed people descending from African slaves and Europeans (mostly Dutch and/or Jews), form 15.7% of the population. Javanese make up 14% of the population, and like the East Indians, descend largely from workers contracted from the island of Java in the former Dutch East Indies (modern Indonesia). 13.4% of the population identifies as being of mixed ethnic heritage. Chinese, originating from 19th-century indentured workers and some recent migration, make up 7.3% of the population.

Other groups include Lebanese, primarily Maronites, and Jews of Sephardic and Ashkenazi origin, whose centre of population was Jodensavanne. Various indigenous peoples make up 3.7% of the population, with the main groups being the Akurio, Lokono, Kalina (Caribs), Tiriyó and Wayana. They live mainly in the districts of Paramaribo, Wanica, Para, Marowijne and Sipaliwini. A small but influential number of Europeans remain in the country, comprising about 1% of the population. They are descended mostly from Dutch 19th-century immigrant farmers, known as "Boeroes" (derived from boer, the Dutch word for "farmer"), and to a lesser degree other European groups, such as Portuguese. Many Boeroes left after independence in 1975.

More recently Suriname has seen a new wave of immigrants, namely Brazilians, Haitians and Chinese (many of them laborers mining for gold). Most do not have legal status.

=== Emigration ===
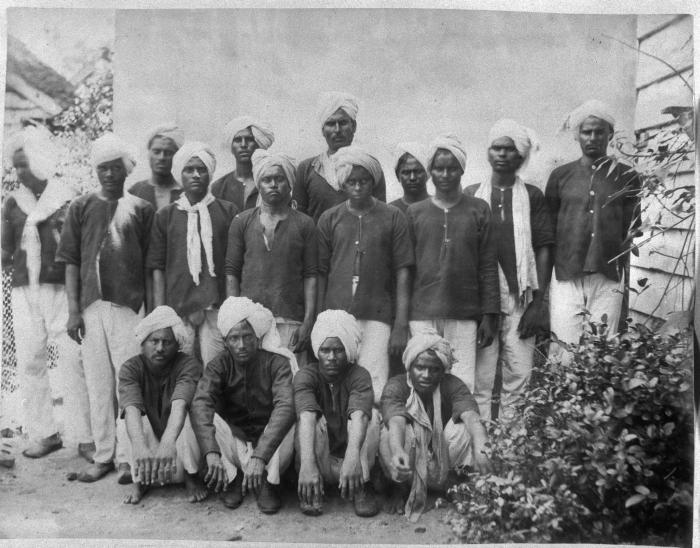
Immigrants from India

The option to choose between Surinamese or Dutch citizenship in the years leading up to Suriname's independence in 1975 led to a mass migration to the Netherlands. This migration continued in the period immediately after independence and during military rule in the 1980s and for largely economic reasons extended throughout the 1990s. The Surinamese community in the Netherlands numbered 350,300 as of 2013 (including children and grandchildren of Suriname migrants born in the Netherlands), compared to approximately 566,000 Surinamese in Suriname itself.

According to the International Organization for Migration, around 272,600 people from Suriname lived in other countries in the late 2010s, in particular in the Netherlands (c. 192,000), France (c. 25,000, most of them in French Guiana), (Note: The International Organization for Migration made a confusion regarding the number of Surinamese migrants living in French Guiana. Their number is already included in the number for France (24,753 at the time of writing), as can be seen here: données complémentaires.) the United States (c. 15,000), Guyana (c. 5,000), Aruba (c. 1,500), and Canada (c. 1,000).

=== Languages ===
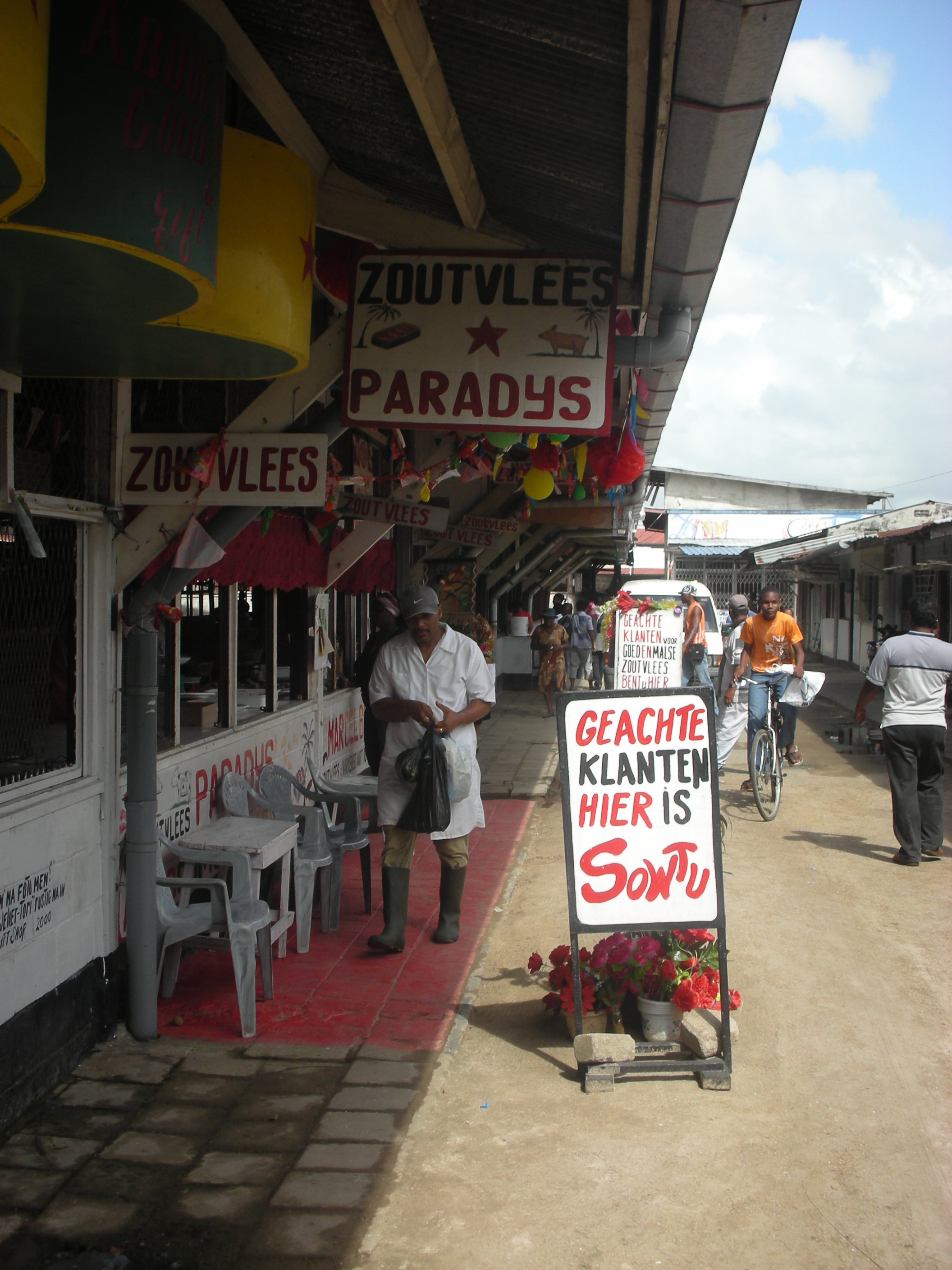
Butcher in the Central Market in Paramaribo with signs written in Dutch

Suriname has roughly 14 local languages, but Dutch (Nederlands) is the sole official language and is the language used in education, government, business, and the media. Over 60% of the population are native speakers of Dutch and around 20%–30% speak it as a second language. In 2004, Suriname became an associate member of the Dutch Language Union.

Suriname is one of three Dutch-speaking sovereign countries in the world (the others being the Netherlands and Belgium). It is also the only area in the Americas where Dutch is spoken by a majority of the population (as territories in the Dutch Caribbean all have other majority languages). Finally, Suriname and English-speaking Guyana are the only countries in South America along with the English-speaking British dependent territory of the Falkland Islands where a Romance language does not predominate.

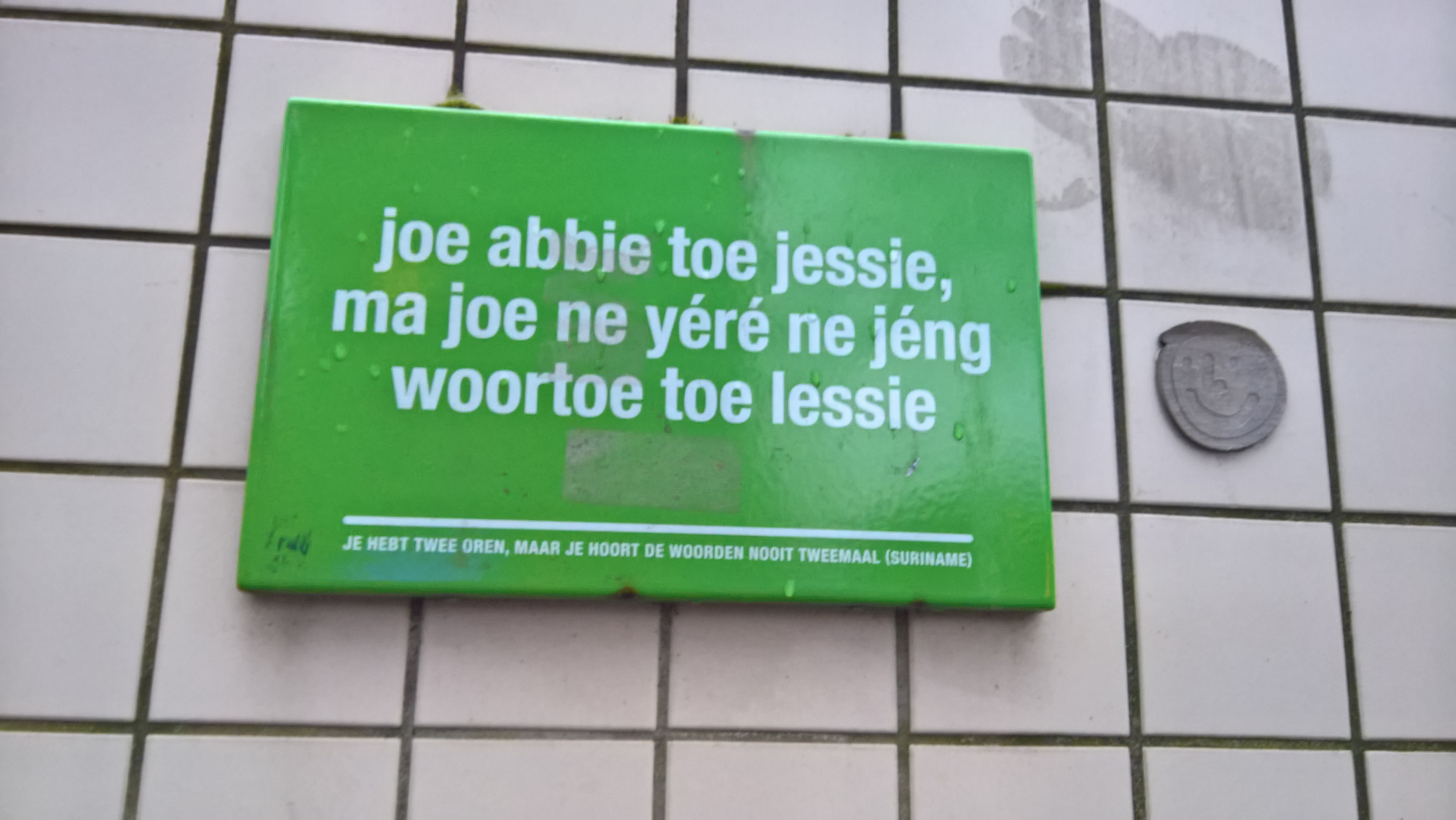
A Sranan Tongo-language poetry sign located in Rotterdam, Netherlands

In Paramaribo, Dutch is the main home language in two-thirds of the households. The recognition of "Surinaams-Nederlands" ("Surinamese Dutch") as a national dialect equal to "Nederlands-Nederlands" ("Dutch Dutch") and "Vlaams-Nederlands" ("Flemish Dutch") was expressed in 2009 by the publication of the Woordenboek Surinaams Nederlands (Surinamese–Dutch Dictionary). It is the most commonly spoken language in urban areas. The local languages are only more predominant than Dutch in the interior of Suriname (namely parts of Sipaliwini and Brokopondo).

Sranan Tongo, a local English-based creole language, is the most widely used vernacular language in daily life and business among the Surinamese. Together with Dutch, it is considered to be one of the two principal languages of Surinamese diglossia. Both are further influenced by other spoken languages which are spoken primarily within ethnic communities. Sranan Tongo is often used interchangeably with Dutch depending on the formality of the setting; Dutch is seen as a prestige dialect and Sranan Tongo the common vernacular.

Sarnami Hindustani, an Indo-Aryan koiné language and the Surinamese variety of Caribbean Hindustani, is the third-most used language. It is primarily spoken by the descendants of Indian indentured labourers from the former British Raj.

The six Maroon languages of Suriname are also considered English-based creole languages, and include Saramaccan, Aukan, Aluku, Paramaccan, Matawai and Kwinti. Aluku, Paramaccan, and Kwinti are so mutually intelligible with Aukan that they can be considered dialects of the Aukan language. The same can be said about Matawai, which is mutually intelligible with Saramaccan.

Surinamese-Javanese is used by the residents of Suriname who are descendants of the Javanese indentured laborers once sent from the Dutch East Indies (now Indonesia).

Amerindian languages include Akurio, Lokono, Carib-Kari'nja, Sikiana-Kashuyana, Tiro-Tiriyó, Waiwai, Warao, and Wayana.

Hakka is spoken by the descendants of the Chinese indentured labourers. Cantonese and Mandarin are spoken by the recent wave of Chinese immigrants.

English, Guyanese English Creole, Portuguese, Spanish, French, and French Guianese Creole are spoken at areas near the country's borders where there are many migrants from neighbouring countries speaking their respective languages. English is spoken by the majority of the population.

=== Religion ===
Religion in Suriname (2012 census)
1. Protestantism (26.7%)
2. Catholicism (21.6%)
3. Jehovah's Witnesses (1.20%)
4. Hinduism (22.3%)
5. Islam (13.9%)
6. Winti (1.80%)
7. Kejawen (0.80%)
8. Other religion (0.90%)
9. None (7.50%)
10. Not stated (3.20%)

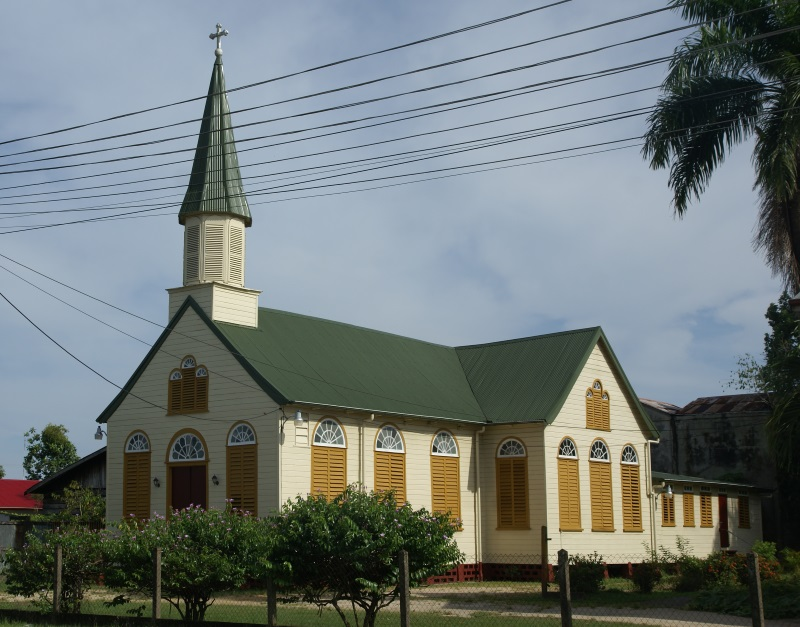
Church of Sacred Heart in Paramaribo

Suriname's religious makeup is heterogeneous and reflective of the country's multicultural character.

According to the 2012 census, 48.4% of Surinamese were Christians; 26.7% were Protestants (11.18% Pentecostal, 11.16% Moravian, 0.7% Reformed (including Remonstrants), and 3.7% other Protestant denominations), while 21.6% were Catholics. Hindus are the second largest religious group in Suriname, comprising one-fifth of the population, the third largest proportion of any country in the Western Hemisphere, after Guyana and Trinidad and Tobago, both of which also have large proportions of Indians. Likewise, almost all practitioners of Hinduism are found among the Indo-Surinamese population. Suriname has the highest proportion of Muslims (13.9%) in the Americas. They are largely of Javanese or Indian descent. Other religions are Winti, an Afro-American religion practiced mostly by those of Maroon ancestry, Javanism (0.8%), a syncretic faith found among some Javanese Surinamese, and various indigenous folk traditions that are often incorporated into one of the larger religions (usually Christianity).

=== Health ===
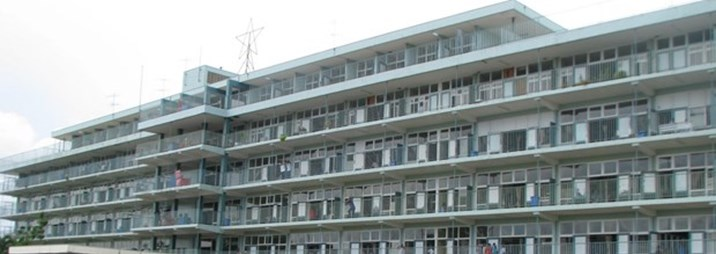
Academic Hospital Paramaribo is the largest hospital in Suriname with 465 beds

The Global Burden of Disease Study provides an on-line data source for analyzing updated estimates of health for 359 diseases and injuries and 84 risk factors from 1990 to 2017 in most of the world's countries. Comparing Suriname with other Caribbean nations show that in 2017 the age-standardized death rate for all causes was 793 (males 969, females 641) per 100,000, far below the 1219 of Haiti, somewhat below the 944 of Guyana but considerably above the 424 of Bermuda. In 1990, the death rate was 960 per 100,000. Life expectancy in 2017 was 72 years (males 69, females 75). The death rate for children < 5 years was 581 per 100,000 compared to 1308 in Haiti and 102 in Bermuda. In 1990 and 2017, the leading causes of age-standardized death rates were cardiovascular disease, cancer, and diabetes/chronic kidney disease.

=== Education ===
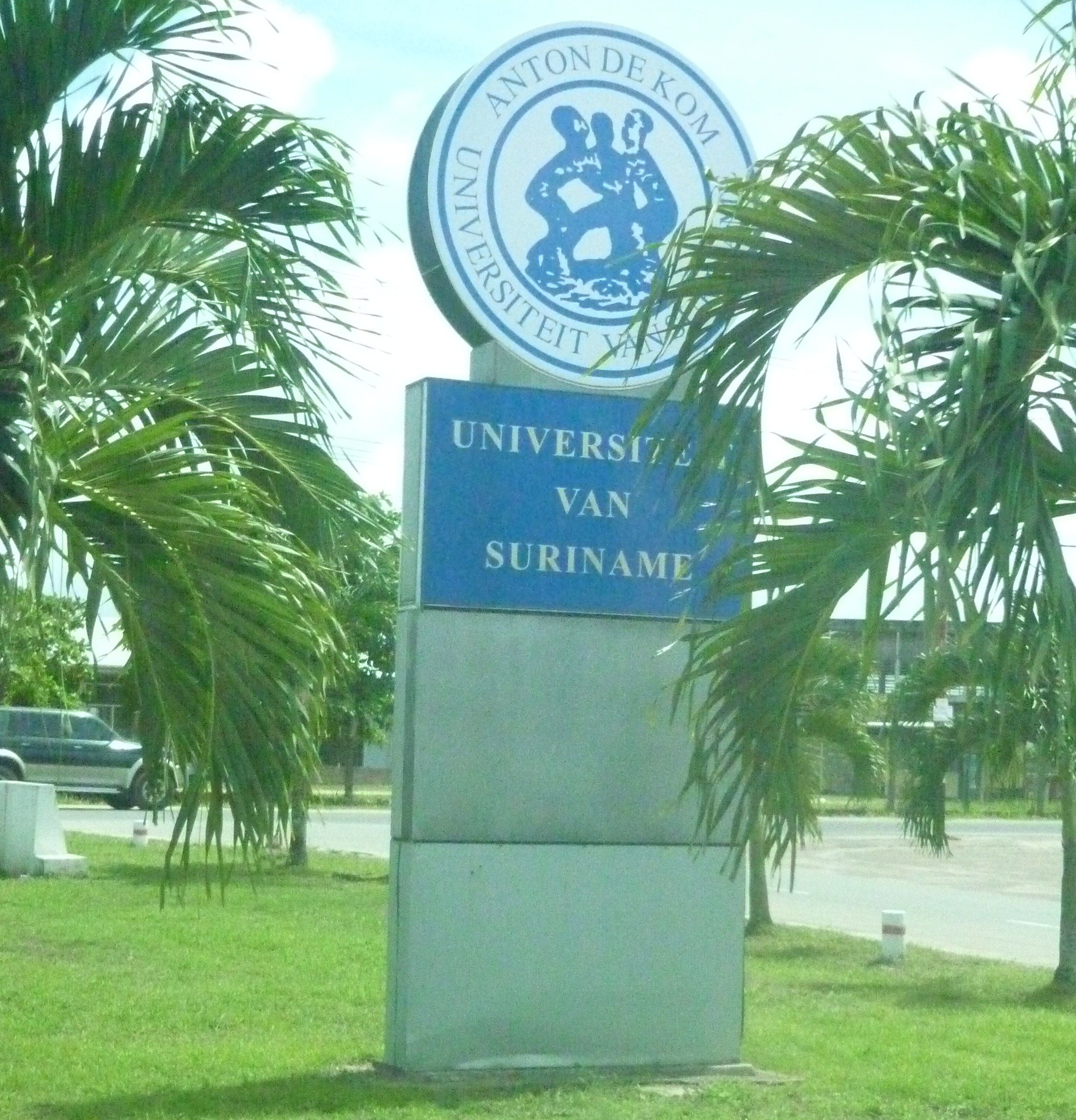
Anton de Kom University of Suriname

Education in Suriname is compulsory until the age of 12, and the nation had a net primary enrollment rate of 94% in 2004. Literacy is very common, particularly among men. The main university in the country is the Anton de Kom University of Suriname.

From elementary school to high school there are 13 grades. The elementary school has six grades, middle school four grades, and high school three grades. Students take a test at the end of elementary school to determine whether they will go to the MULO (secondary modern school) or a middle school of lower standards like LBO.

== Culture ==
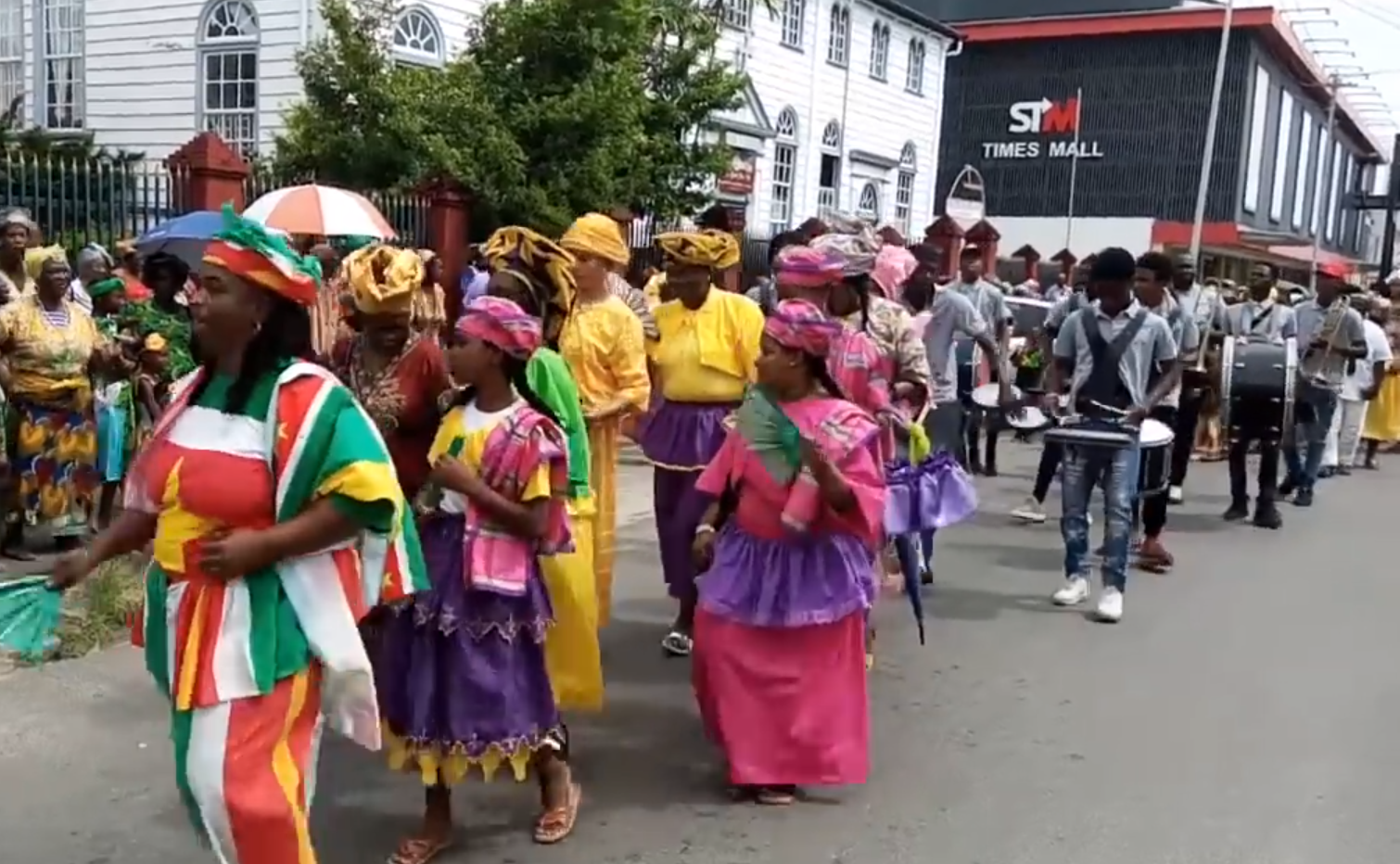
Ketikoti celebrations in Paramaribo

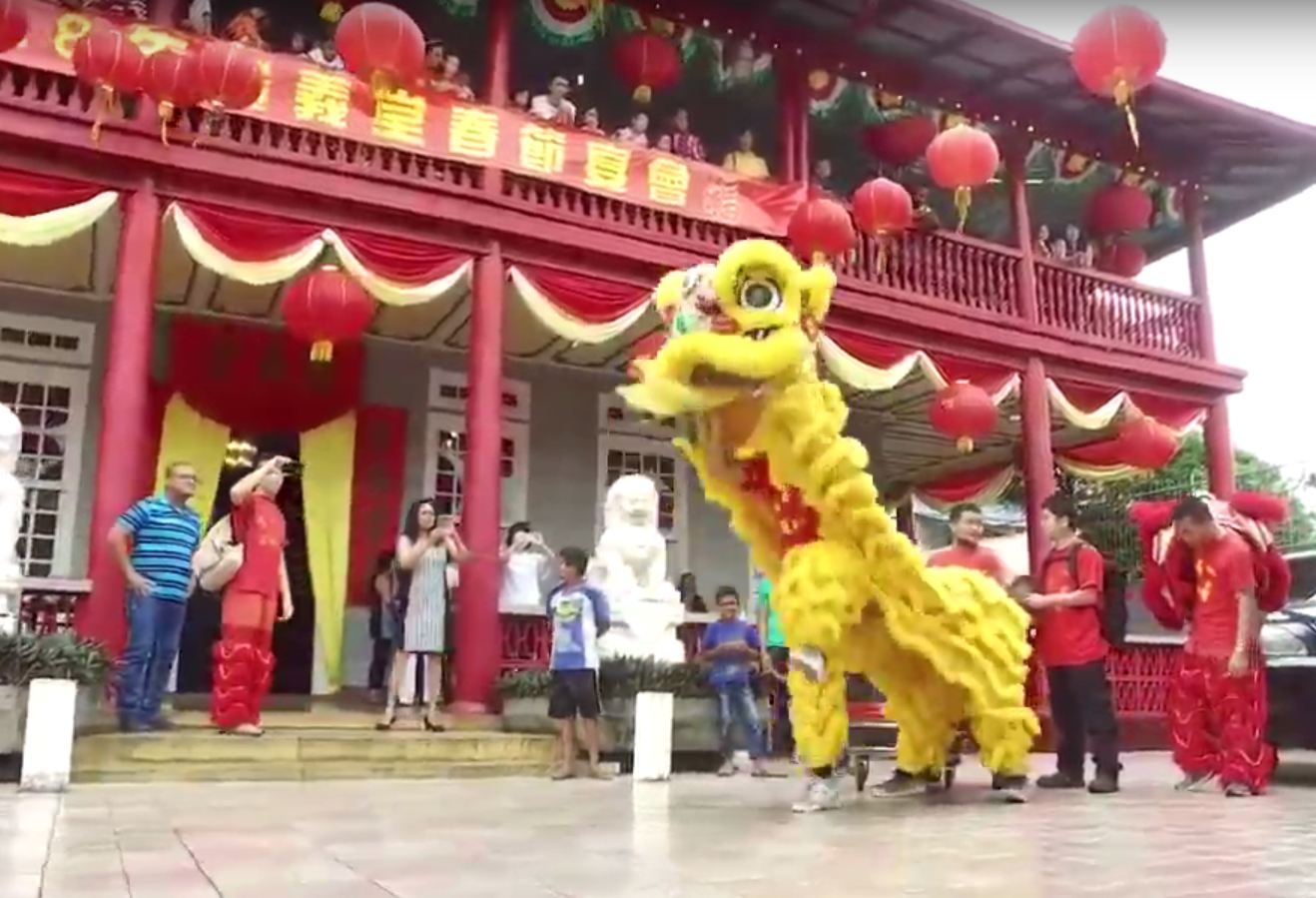
Lion dance at Chinese New Year celebrations in Suriname

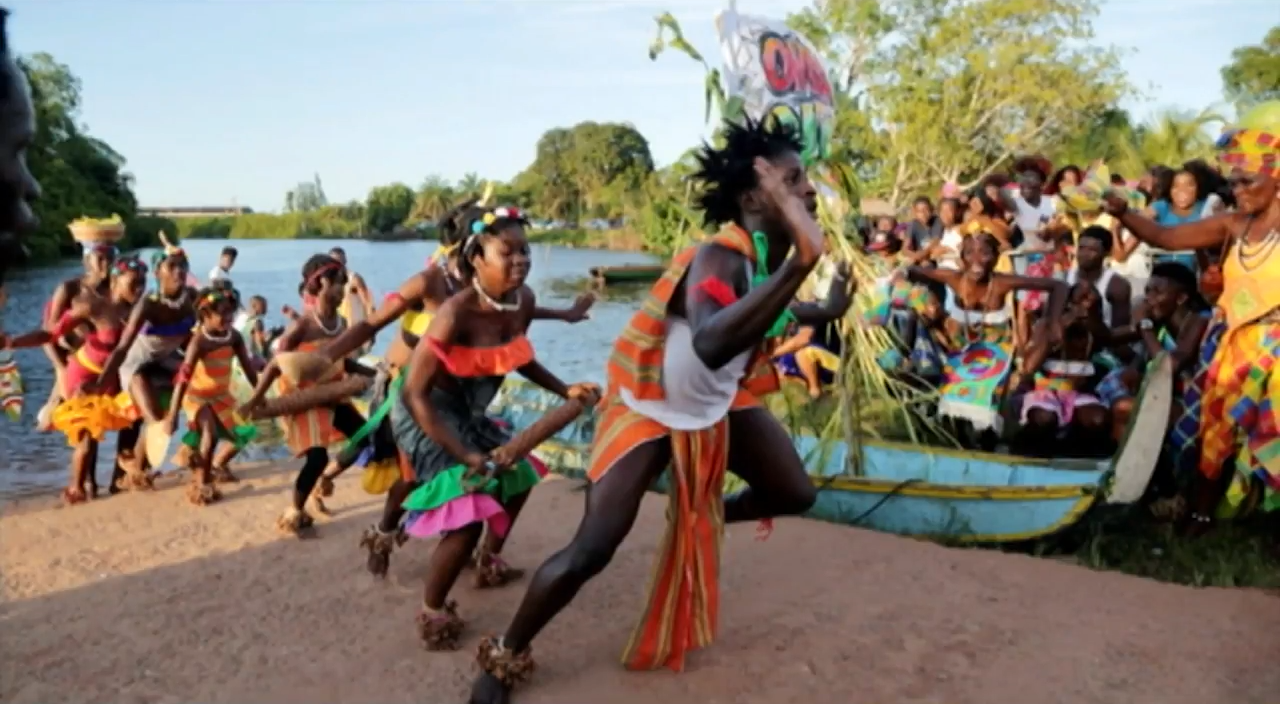
Moengo Festival Theatre and Dance in 2017

Owing to the country's multicultural heritage, Suriname celebrates a variety of distinct ethnic and religious festivals.

=== National holidays ===
Date	Holiday
1 January	New Year's Day
January/February	Chinese New Year
March	Phagwah
March/April	Good Friday
March/April	Easter Sunday
March/April	Easter Monday
1 May	Labour Day
1 July	Emancipation Day
9 August	Indigenous People's Day
10 October	Maroons Day
October/November	Diwali
25 November	Independence Day
25 December	Christmas Day
26 December	Second Day of Christmas
1 Shawwal	Eid-ul-Fitr
10 Dhu al-Hijjah	Eid-ul-Adha

There are several holidays which are unique to Suriname. These include the Prawas Din (Indian), Javanese, and Chinese arrival days. They celebrate the arrival of the first ships with their respective immigrants.

==== New Year's Eve ====
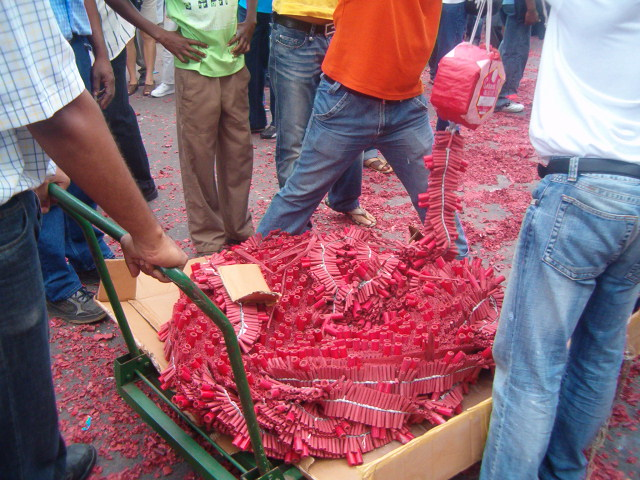
Pagara (red firecracker ribbons)

New Year's Eve in Suriname is called Oud jaar, Owru Yari, or "old year". Firecrackers called pagaras with long ribbons attached are detonated at midnight.

=== Media ===
Traditionally, De Ware Tijd was the major newspaper of the country, but since the '90s Times of Suriname, De West and Dagblad Suriname have also been well-read newspapers. All publish primarily in Dutch.

Suriname has twenty-four radio stations, most of them also broadcast through the Internet. There are twelve television sources: ABC (Ch. 4–1, 2), RBN (Ch. 5–1, 2), Rasonic TV (Ch. 7), STVS (Ch. 8–1, 2, 3, 4, 5, 6), Apintie (Ch. 10–1), ATV (Ch. 12–1, 2, 3, 4), Radika (Ch. 14), SCCN (Ch. 17–1, 2, 3), Pipel TV (Ch. 18–1, 2), Trishul (Ch. 20–1, 2, 3, 4), Garuda (Ch. 23–1, 2, 3), Sangeetmala (Ch. 26), Ch. 30, Ch. 31, Ch.32, Ch.38, SCTV (Ch. 45). Also listened to is mArt, a broadcaster from Amsterdam founded by people from Suriname. Kondreman is one of the popular cartoons in Suriname.

There are also three major news sites: Starnieuws, Suriname Herald, and GFC Nieuws.

In 2022, Suriname ranked 52nd in the worldwide Press Freedom Index by the organization Reporters Without Borders, a strong drop in the ranking compared to the 2018–2021 period (about rank 20).

=== Sports ===
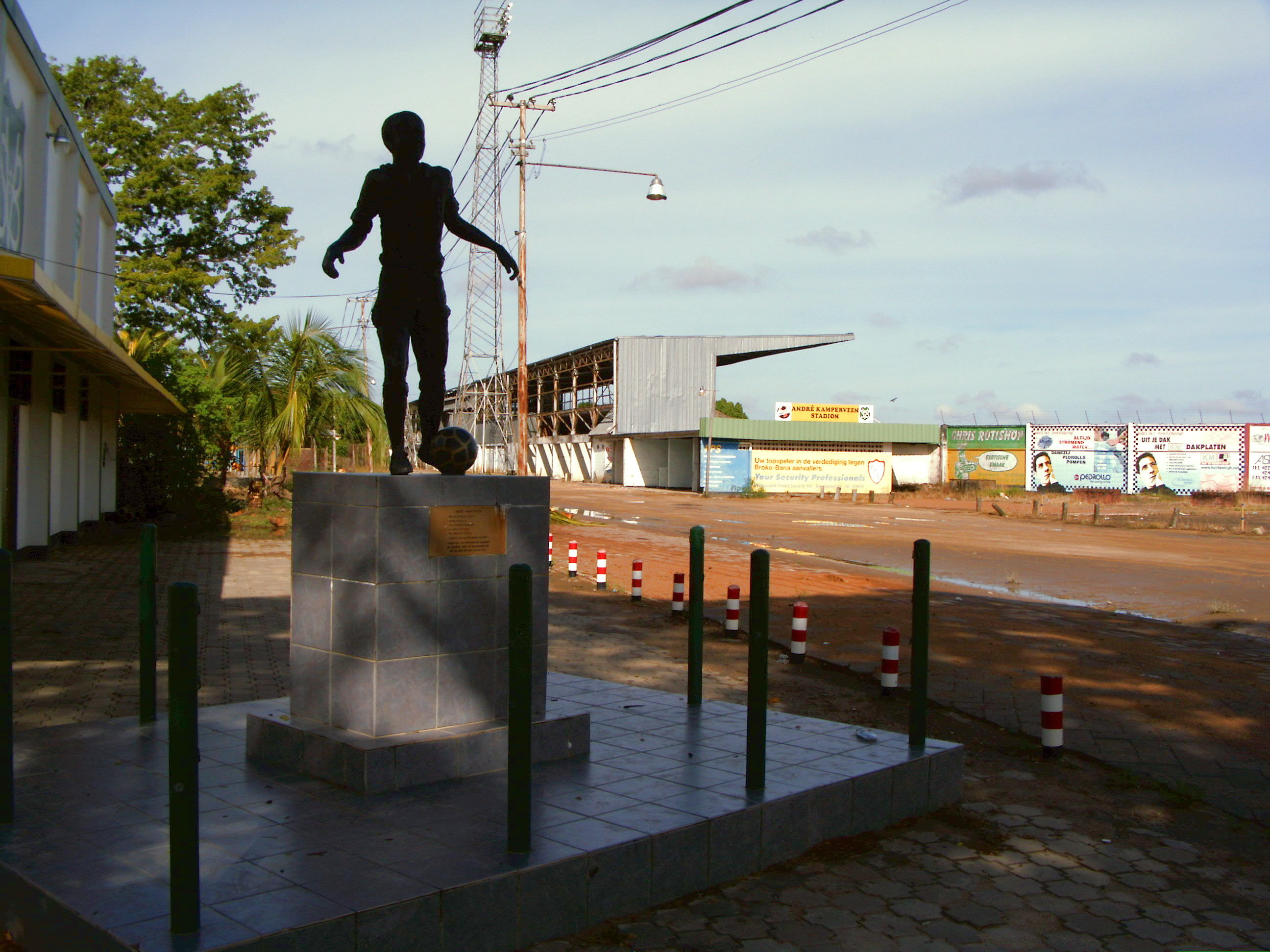
André Kamperveen Stadium

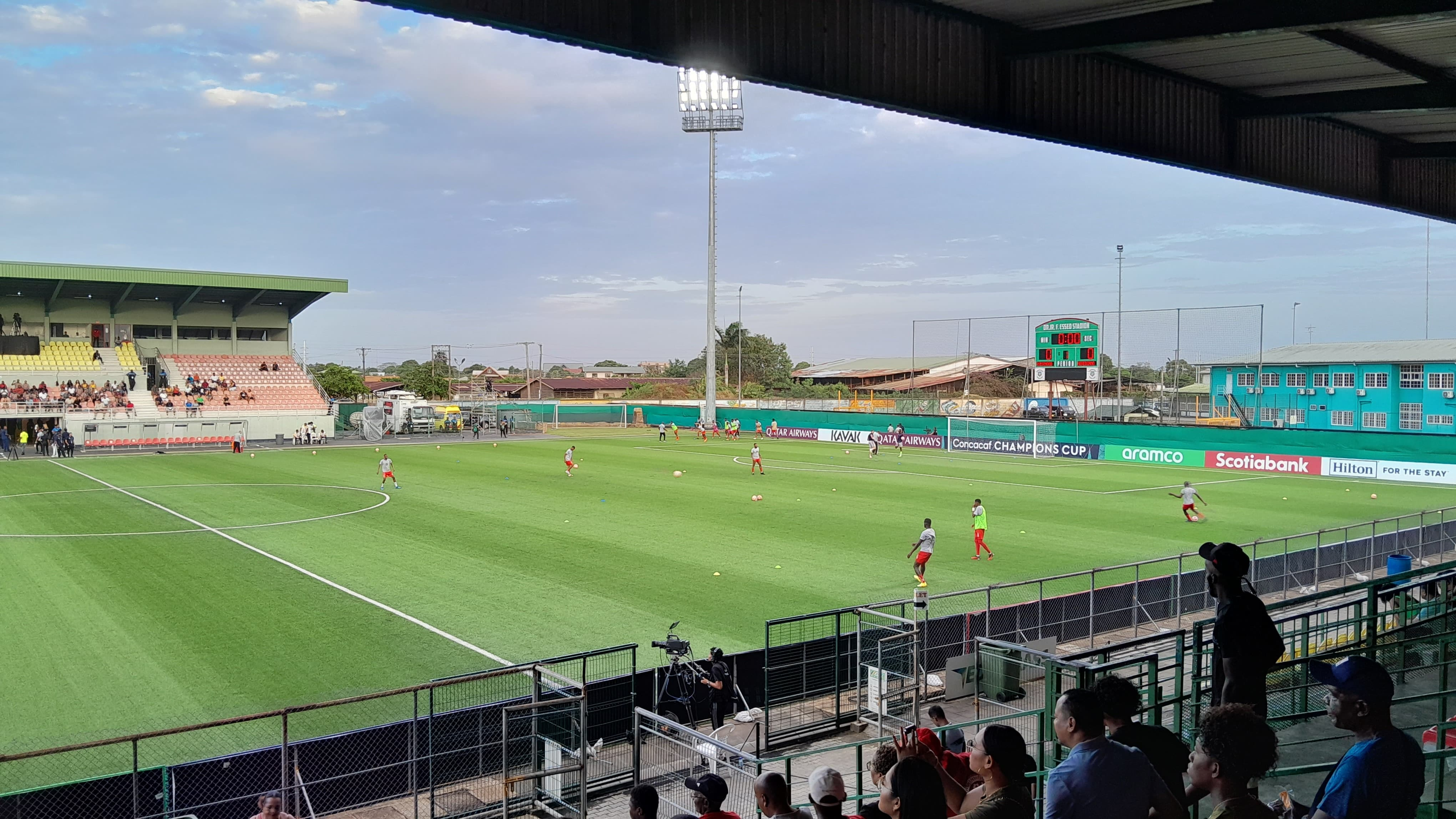
Franklin Essed Stadium

The most popular sport in Suriname is football, followed by basketball and volleyball. The Suriname Olympic Committee is the national governing body for sports in Suriname. The major mind sports are chess, draughts, bridge and troefcall.

Many Suriname-born football players and Dutch-born football players of Surinamese descent have turned out to play for the Dutch national team, including Gerald Vanenburg, Ruud Gullit, Frank Rijkaard, Edgar Davids, Clarence Seedorf, Patrick Kluivert, Aron Winter, Ryan Babel, Georginio Wijnaldum, Virgil van Dijk, and Jimmy Floyd Hasselbaink, Donyell Malen, Xavi Simons, Ryan Gravenberch, and Denzel Dumfries. In 1999, Humphrey Mijnals, who played for both Suriname and the Netherlands, was elected Surinamese footballer of the century. Another famous player is André Kamperveen, who captained Suriname in the 1940s and was the first Surinamese to play professionally in the Netherlands.

In 2021 Suriname participated in their first CONCACAF Gold Cup where they played against Costa Rica, Jamaica and Guadeloupe in Group C. Suriname lost its first two matches against Jamaica and Costa Rica, but ended third in the group following a 2–1 win against Guadeloupe.

Swimmer Anthony Nesty is the only Olympic medalist for Suriname. He won gold in the 100-meter butterfly at the 1988 Summer Olympics in Seoul and he won bronze in the same discipline at the 1992 Summer Olympics in Barcelona. Originally from Trinidad and Tobago, he now lives in Gainesville, Florida, and is the head coach of the University of Florida swim team.

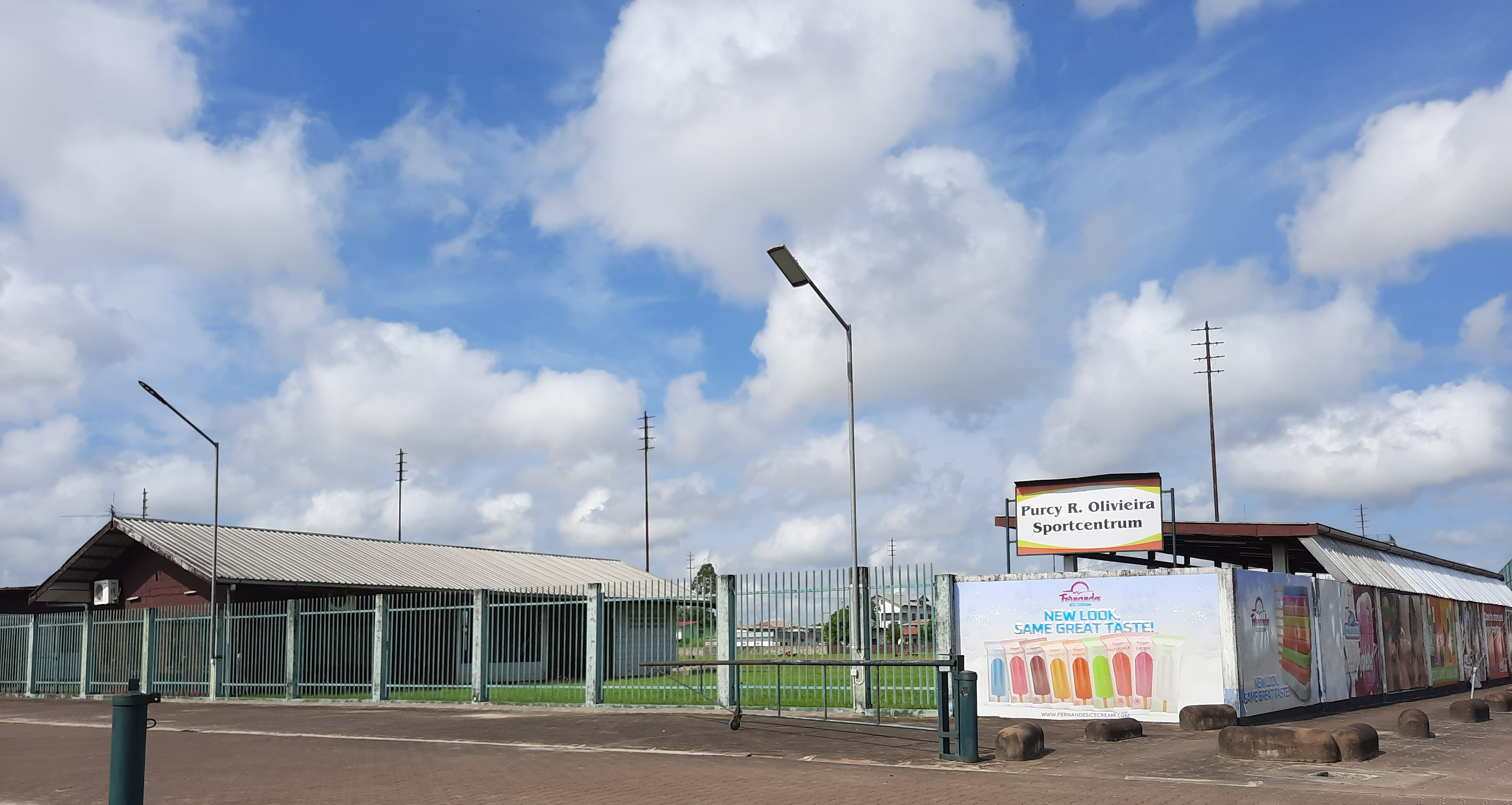
Purcy R. Olivieira Sports Centre

The most famous international track & field athlete from Suriname is Letitia Vriesde, who won a silver medal at the 1995 World Championships behind Ana Quirot in the 800 metres, the first medal won by a South American female athlete in World Championship competition. In addition, she also won a bronze medal at the 2001 World Championships and won several medals in the 800 and 1500 metres at the Pan-American Games and Central American and Caribbean Games. Tommy Asinga also received acclaim for winning a bronze medal in the 800 metres at the 1991 Pan American Games.

Cricket is popular in Suriname to some extent, influenced by its popularity in the Netherlands and in neighbouring Guyana. The Surinaamse Cricket Bond is an associate member of the International Cricket Council (ICC). Suriname and Argentina were the only ICC associate members in South America when ICC had a three tiered membership, although Guyana is represented on the West Indies Cricket Board, a full member. The national cricket team was ranked 47th in the world and sixth in the ICC Americas region as of June 2014, and competes in the World Cricket League (WCL) and ICC Americas Championship. Iris Jharap, born in Paramaribo, played women's One Day International matches for the Dutch national side, the only Surinamese to do so.

In the sport of badminton, another popular sport in Suriname especially with the youth, the local heroes are Virgil Soeroredjo, Mitchel Wongsodikromo, Sören Opti and also Crystal Leefmans. All winning medals for Suriname at the Carebaco Caribbean Championships, the Central American and Caribbean Games (CACSO Games) and also at the South American Games, better known as the ODESUR Games. Virgil Soeroredjo also participated for Suriname at the 2012 London Summer Olympics, only the second badminton player, after Oscar Brandon, for Suriname to achieve this. National Champion Sören Opti became the third Surinamese badminton player to participate at the Summer Olympics in 2016.

Multiple time K-1 kickboxing world champions Ernesto Hoost and Remy Bonjasky were born in Suriname or are of Surinamese descent. Other kickboxing world champions include Gilbert Ballantine, Rayen Simson, Melvin Manhoef, Tyrone Spong, Andy Ristie, Jairzinho Rozenstruik, Regian Eersel, and Donovan Wisse.

Suriname also has a national korfball team, with korfball being a Dutch sport. Vinkensport is also practised.

In 2016, the Sports Hall of Fame Suriname was established in the building of the Suriname Olympic Committee and is dedicated to the achievements of the Surinamese sporters.

== See also ==
- Outline of Suriname
- Oroonoko a novel by Aphra Behn partly based on her 1663 visit to Suriname.

== Sources ==
This article incorporates text from a free content work. Licensed under CC BY 4.0 (license statement/permission). Text taken from Global Forest Resources Assessment 2025, Food and Agriculture Organization of the United Nations (FAO).
