= Outline of Suriname =

Country in South America

The Flag of Suriname

The Coat of arms of Suriname

The location of Suriname

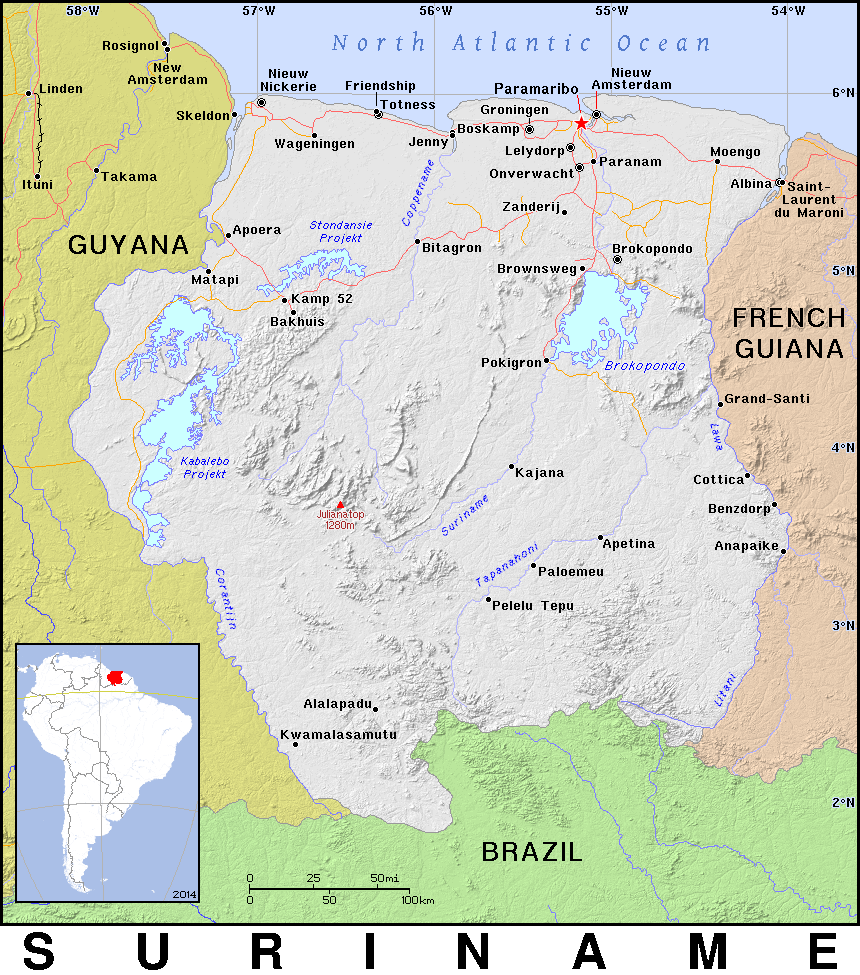
The internationally recognized borders of Suriname upon independence in 1975

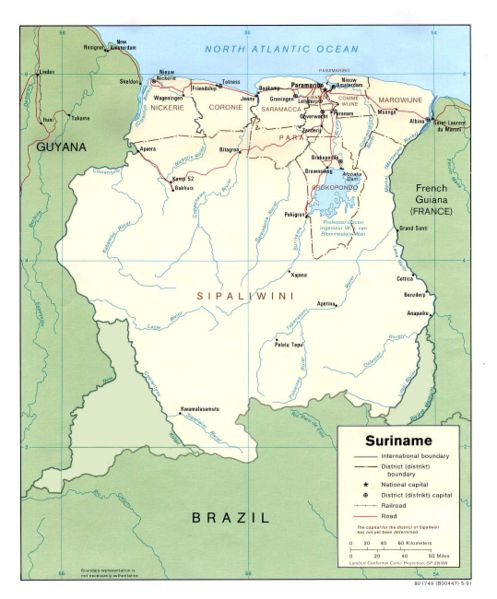
An enlargeable relief map of the Republic of Suriname with disputed territories included

The following outline is provided as an overview of and topical guide to Suriname:

Suriname – sovereign state on the northeastern Atlantic coast of South America, and the smallest country on that continent. It was long inhabited by indigenous tribal peoples with diverse cultures, before being explored and contested by European powers from the 16th century, and eventually coming under Dutch rule in the late 17th century. In 1954, the country became one of the constituent countries of the Kingdom of the Netherlands. On 25 November 1975, the country of Suriname left the Kingdom of the Netherlands to become an independent state, while maintaining close economic, diplomatic, and cultural ties to its former colonizer. Suriname is the only sovereign nation outside Europe where Dutch is spoken by a majority of the population.

== General reference ==
- Pronunciation: /ˈsʊərɪnæm, -nɑːm/, Dutch: [syːriˈnaːmə], Portuguese: [suɾiˈnɐmi], Surinamese: [sraˈnãŋ]
- Common English country name: Suriname
- Official English country name: The Republic of Suriname
- Common endonym(s):
- Official endonym(s):
- Adjectival(s): Surinamese
- Demonym(s): Surinamese
- Etymology: From "Surinen", an indigenous people who inhabited the area at the time of European contact.
- ISO country codes: SR, SUR, 740
- ISO region codes: See ISO 3166-2:SR
- Internet country code top-level domain: .sr

== Geography of Suriname ==
An enlargeable topographic map of Suriname

Geography of Suriname

- Suriname is: a country
- Location:
  - Northern Hemisphere
  - Western Hemisphere
    - South America
  - Time zone: UTC-03
  - Extreme points of Suriname
    - High: Juliana Top 1,230 m (4,035 ft)
    - Low: North Atlantic Ocean 0 m
  - Land boundaries: 1,703 km

Guyana 600 km
Brazil 593 km
France 510 km

- Coastline: North Atlantic Ocean 386 km

- Population of Suriname: 534,000 - 168th most populous country
- Area of Suriname: 163,821 km^{2}
- Atlas of Suriname

=== Environment of Suriname ===
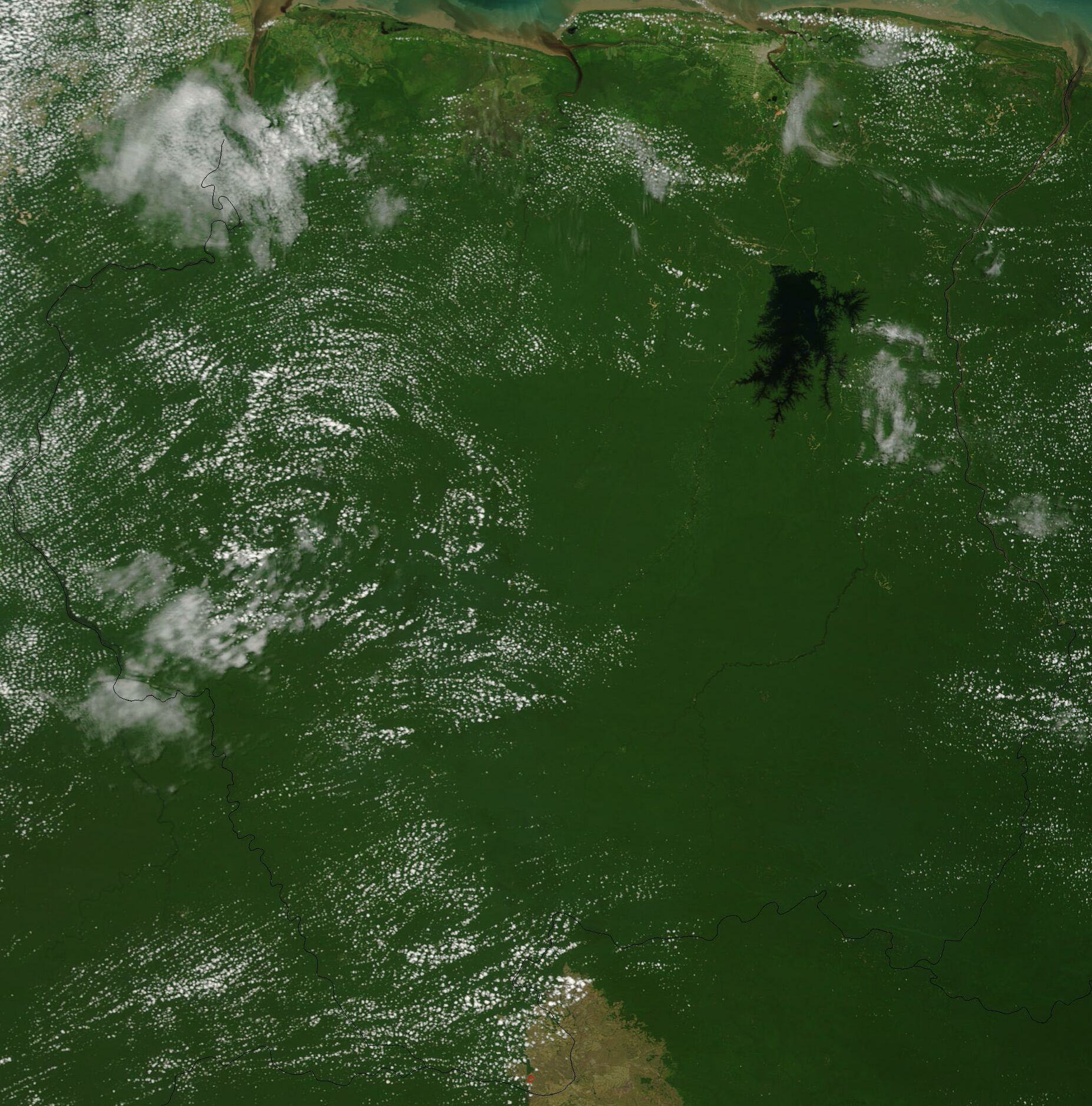
An enlargeable satellite image of Suriname

- Climate of Suriname
- Protected areas of Suriname
- Wildlife of Suriname
  - Fauna of Suriname
    - Birds of Suriname
    - Mammals of Suriname

==== Natural geographic features of Suriname ====
- Islands of Suriname
- Rivers of Suriname
- World Heritage Sites in Suriname

=== Regions of Suriname ===
Regions of Suriname

==== Ecoregions of Suriname ====
List of ecoregions in Suriname

==== Administrative divisions of Suriname ====
Administrative divisions of Suriname

- Districts of Suriname

===== Districts of Suriname =====
Districts of Suriname

- Brokopondo
- Commewijne
- Coronie
- Marowijne
- Nickerie
- Para
- Paramaribo
- Saramacca
- Sipaliwini
- Wanica

=== Demography of Suriname ===
Demographics of Suriname

== Government and politics of Suriname ==
Politics of Suriname

- Form of government: unitary parliamentary representative democratic republic
- Capital of Suriname: Paramaribo
- Elections in Suriname
- Political parties in Suriname

=== Branches of the government of Suriname ===
Government of Suriname

==== Executive branch of the government of Suriname ====
- Head of state and head of government: President of Suriname, Jennifer Geerlings-Simons

==== Legislative branch of the government of Suriname ====
- Parliament of Suriname: National Assembly (unicameral)

==== Judicial branch of the government of Suriname ====
Court system of Suriname

- Supreme Court of Suriname

=== Foreign relations of Suriname ===
Foreign relations of Suriname

- Diplomatic missions in Suriname
- Diplomatic missions of Suriname

==== International organization membership ====
The Republic of Suriname is a member of:

- African, Caribbean, and Pacific Group of States (ACP)
- Agency for the Prohibition of Nuclear Weapons in Latin America and the Caribbean (OPANAL)
- Caribbean Community and Common Market (Caricom)
- Food and Agriculture Organization (FAO)
- Group of 77 (G77)
- Inter-American Development Bank (IADB)
- International Bank for Reconstruction and Development (IBRD)
- International Civil Aviation Organization (ICAO)
- International Criminal Court (ICCt)
- International Criminal Police Organization (Interpol)
- International Federation of Red Cross and Red Crescent Societies (IFRCS)
- International Fund for Agricultural Development (IFAD)
- International Hydrographic Organization (IHO) (suspended)
- International Labour Organization (ILO)
- International Maritime Organization (IMO)
- International Monetary Fund (IMF)
- International Olympic Committee (IOC)
- International Organization for Standardization (ISO) (subscriber)
- International Red Cross and Red Crescent Movement (ICRM)
- International Telecommunication Union (ITU)
- International Trade Union Confederation (ITUC)
- Inter-Parliamentary Union (IPU)
- Islamic Development Bank (IDB)
- Latin American Economic System (LAES)
- Multilateral Investment Guarantee Agency (MIGA)
- Nonaligned Movement (NAM)
- Organisation of Islamic Cooperation (OIC)
- Organisation for the Prohibition of Chemical Weapons (OPCW)
- Organization of American States (OAS)
- Permanent Court of Arbitration (PCA)
- Union of South American Nations (UNASUR)
- United Nations (UN)
- United Nations Conference on Trade and Development (UNCTAD)
- United Nations Educational, Scientific, and Cultural Organization (UNESCO)
- United Nations Industrial Development Organization (UNIDO)
- Universal Postal Union (UPU)
- World Confederation of Labour (WCL)
- World Federation of Trade Unions (WFTU)
- World Health Organization (WHO)
- World Intellectual Property Organization (WIPO)
- World Meteorological Organization (WMO)
- World Trade Organization (WTO)

=== Law and order in Suriname ===
Law of Suriname

- Capital punishment in Suriname
- Constitution of Suriname
- Crime in Suriname
- Human rights in Suriname
  - LGBT rights in Suriname
- Law enforcement in Suriname

=== Military of Suriname ===
Military of Suriname

- Command
  - Commander-in-chief:
- Forces
  - Army of Suriname
  - Air Force of Suriname

=== Local government in Suriname ===
Local government in Suriname

== History of Suriname ==
History of Suriname

- Timeline of the history of Suriname
- Current events of Suriname

== Culture of Suriname ==
Culture of Suriname

- Cuisine of Suriname
- Languages of Suriname
- National symbols of Suriname
  - Coat of arms of Suriname
  - Flag of Suriname
  - National anthem of Suriname
- People of Suriname
- Prostitution in Suriname
- Public holidays in Suriname
- Religion in Suriname
  - Christianity in Suriname
  - Hinduism in Suriname
  - Islam in Suriname
- World Heritage Sites in Suriname

=== Art in Suriname ===
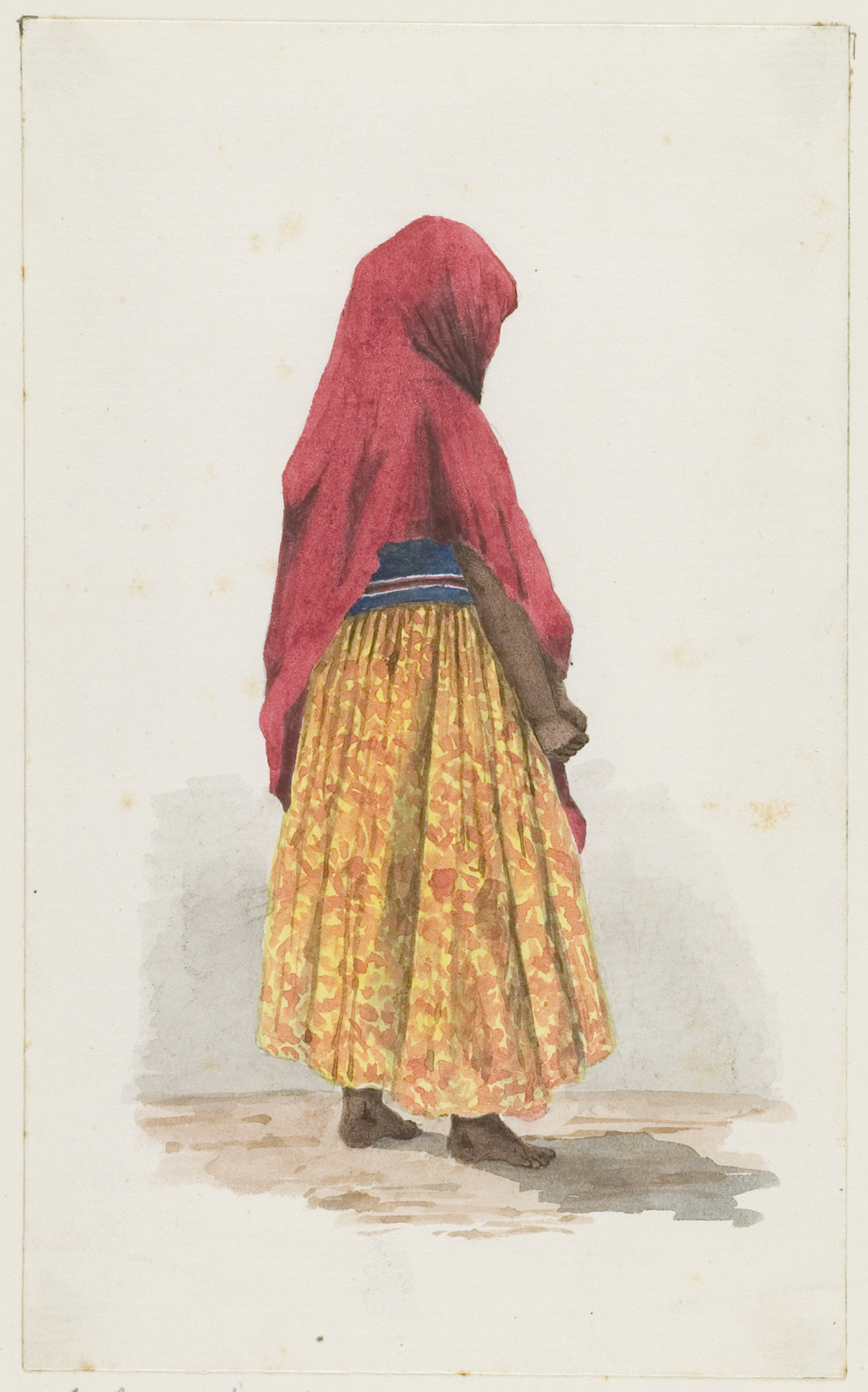
Arnoldus Borret: Suriname woman with red shawl, water colour, around 1880

- Music of Suriname

=== Sports in Suriname ===
Sports in Suriname

- Football in Suriname
- Suriname at the Olympics

== Economy and infrastructure of Suriname ==
Economy of Suriname

- Economic rank, by nominal GDP (2007): 154th (one hundred and fifty fourth)
- Agriculture in Suriname
- Communications in Suriname
  - Internet in Suriname
- Companies of Suriname
- Currency of Suriname: Dollar
  - ISO 4217: SRD
- Transport in Suriname
  - Airports in Suriname
  - Rail transport in Suriname

== Education in Suriname ==
Education in Suriname

== See also ==
Suriname

- List of international rankings
- Member state of the United Nations
- Outline of South America
- List of place names of Dutch origin
