= Colombia–Suriname relations =

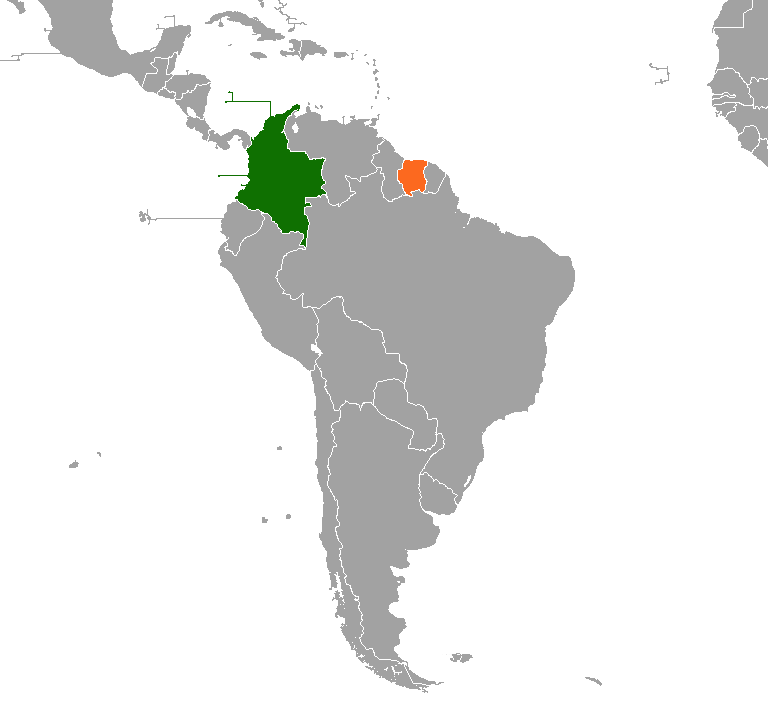
- Colombia: Suriname

Diplomatic mission
- Embassy of Colombia in Port of Spain: Embassy of Suriname in Caracas

Colombia–Suriname relations are diplomatic relations between the Republic of Colombia and the Republic of Suriname. Both governments have maintained a friendly relationship since the late 20th century. Both countries belong to the Community of Latin American and Caribbean States, the Organization of American States and the Union of South American Nations, and are associated states of Mercosur.

== History ==
Both governments established diplomatic relations in 1978. On 19 May 2019, the Minister of Foreign Affairs of Colombia, Carlos Holmes Trujillo, visited Suriname, meeting with the Foreign Minister, Yldiz Pollack-Beighle; both signed a Memorandum of Understanding for academic cooperation.

== Economic relations ==
Colombia exported products worth 4,925 thousand dollars, the main products being from the agro-industrial industry, while Colombia imported products worth 83 thousand dollars, the main products also being from the agro-industrial industry.

In 2022, Suriname exported 879 thousand dollars to Colombia. The products that Suriname exported to Colombia were related to Oscilloscopes (183 thousand dollars), Excavation Machinery (125 thousand dollars), and other Edible Preparations (110 thousand dollars). Colombia also exported 27 million dollars to Suriname. Exports from Colombia to Suriname included Special Purpose Ships (9.97 million dollars), Cement (3.33 million dollars), and Raw Sugar (2.6 million dollars).

== Diplomatic representation ==
- Colombia uses its embassy in Port of Spain as a concurrent embassy in Suriname.
- Suriname uses its embassy in Caracas as a concurrent embassy in Colombia.

== See also ==
- Foreign relations of Colombia
- Foreign relations of Suriname
