= Ghana–Suriname relations =

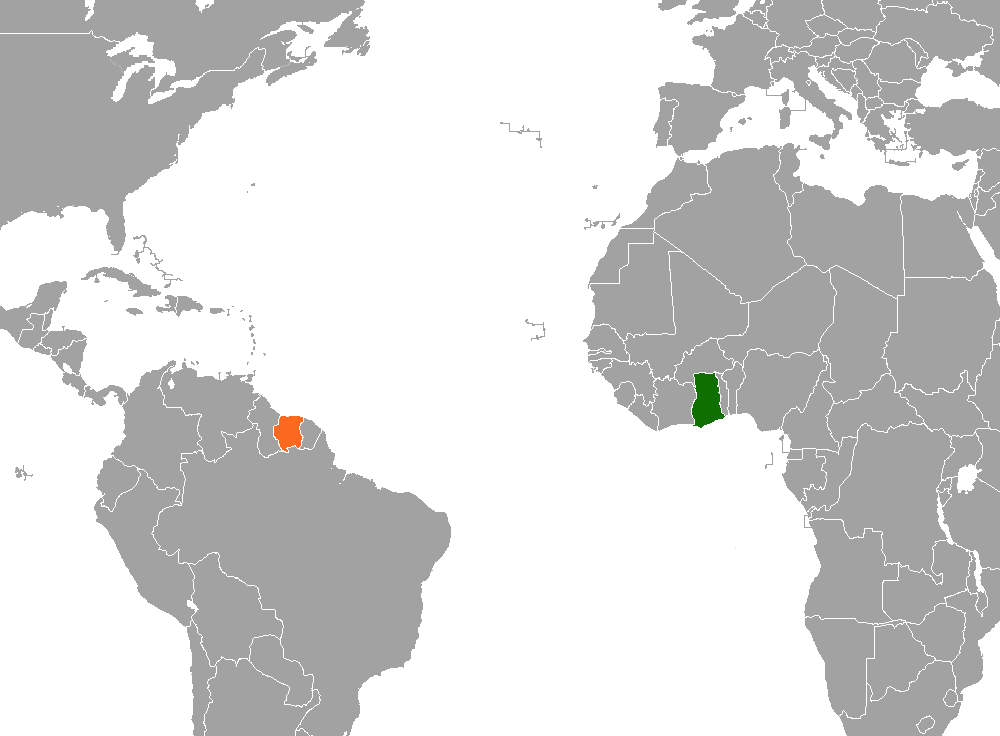
- Ghana: Suriname

Ghanaian–Surinamese relations are the bilateral relations between Ghana and Suriname. Both countries established diplomatic relations on 24 November 1975. Both countries are members of OACPS and former Dutch colonies.

Suriname maintains an embassy in Accra. The current ambassador of Suriname to Ghana is Fidelia Graand-Galon taking over from Natasha Halfhuid.

== History ==
Most of the enslaved people imported to Suriname came from West Central Africa (circa 61,500 slaves, 27% of the total number), Gold Coast (Ghana) (circa 46,000, 21% of the total).

The Akans from the central Ghana were, officially, the predominant ethnic group of slaves in Suriname.

Enslaved people including the Ewe (who live in southern Ghana, Togo and Benin)

== Resident diplomatic missions ==
- Ghana is accredited to Suriname from its embassy in Brasília, Brazil.
- Suriname has an embassy in Accra.

== See also ==
- Afro-Surinamese
- Dutch Empire
- Foreign relations of Ghana
- Foreign relations of Suriname
- OACPS
