= Cuba–Suriname relations =

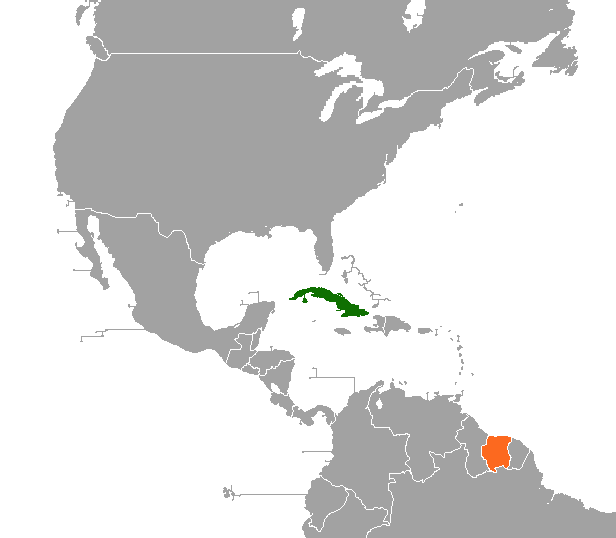

- Cuba: Suriname

Diplomatic relations between Cuba and Suriname were established on 23 March 1979. Suriname has had an embassy in Havana since 2003. Cuba has had an embassy in Paramaribo since 1981.

== History ==
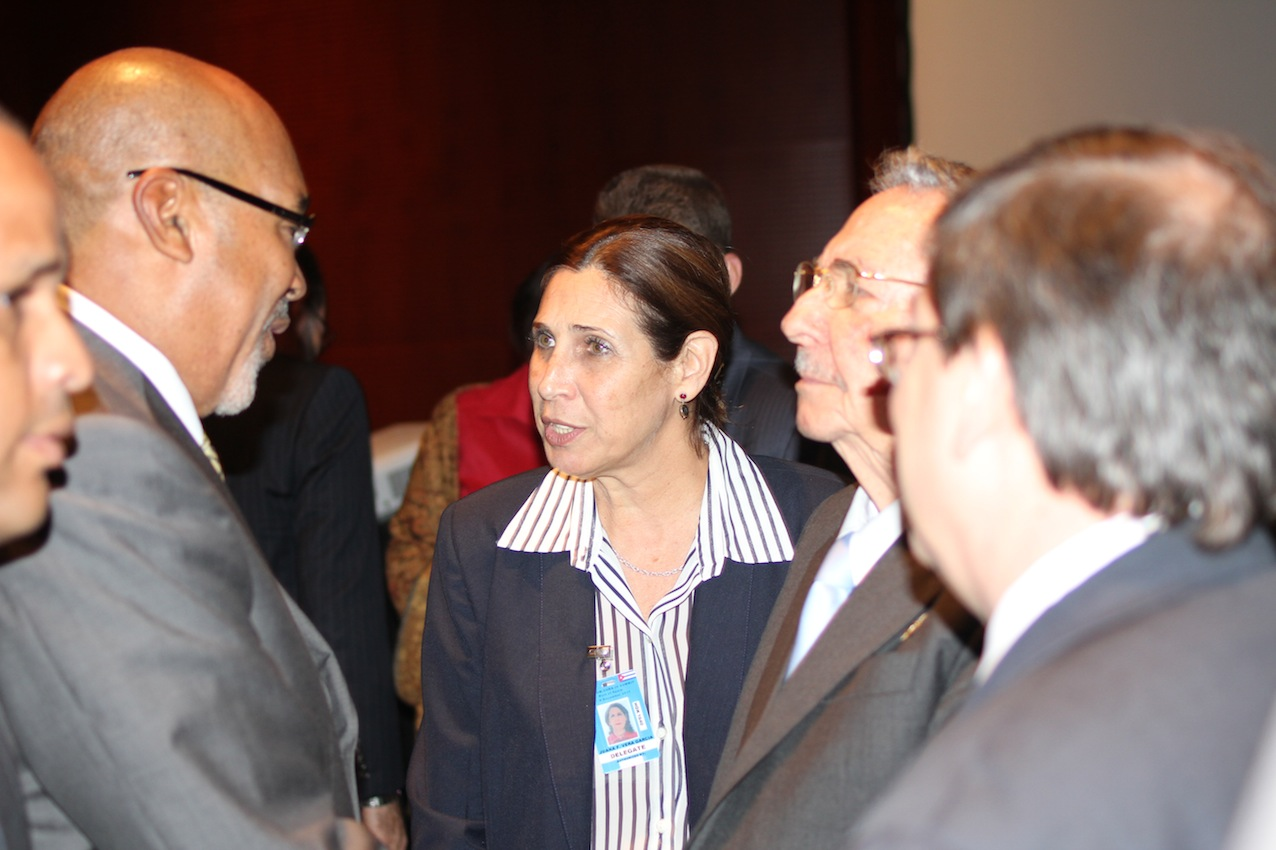
Desi Bouterse (left) and Raúl Castro (right) at a CARICOM meeting (2011)

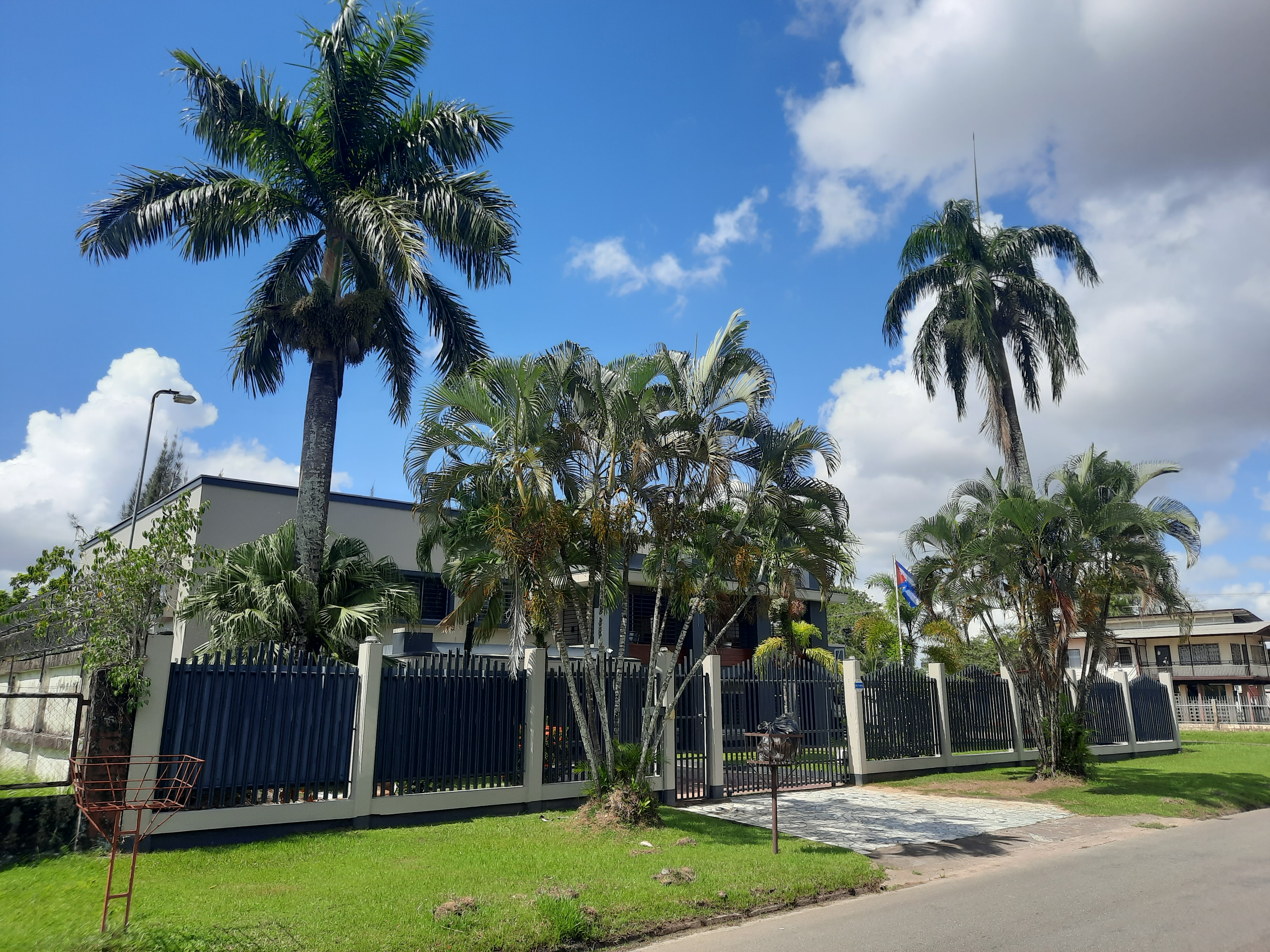
Embassy of Cuba in Paramaribo

After the 1980 Surinamese coup d'état, Fidel Castro was the first head of state to offer his congratulations to Desi Bouterse. Cuba established an embassy in Paramaribo in 1981, which developed into the largest diplomatic mission in Suriname. The murder of Maurice Bishop in 1983, and subsequent invasion of Grenada, was followed by the downgrading of the Cuban embassy to a diplomatic post with a chargé d'affaires and the expulsion of 105 Cuban diplomats and advisors. The National Military Council denied a correlation between the expulsion and the events in Grenada.

In 1998, President Wijdenbosch made a state visit to Cuba and promised to renew diplomatic relations. In 2006, the Cuban embassy was re-established. In 2011, there was a state visit by President Bouterse to Cuba to discuss trade.

Cuba has sent many medical doctors to Suriname. In 2020, during the COVID-19 pandemic, 50 doctors were dispatched to Suriname. Cuba also provided scholarships and medical education; however, the program was cancelled in August 2020. In the 2020s, Cuban refugees increasingly used Suriname as a transit country to the United States. In January 2021, a group of 500 Cubans stranded in South Drain, where they were denied access to Guyana, from which they had hoped to catch a flight to the United States.

== Trade ==
Trade between Suriname and Cuba is negligible. In 2019, Suriname exported US$242,000 worth of goods to Cuba with the main product being wood. Cuba exported US$318,000 worth of goods, with the main product being detonating fuses.

== Resident diplomatic missions ==
- Cuba has an embassy in Paramaribo.
- Suriname has an embassy in Havana.

== See also ==
- Foreign relations of Cuba
- Foreign relations of Suriname
