= Suriname–Venezuela relations =

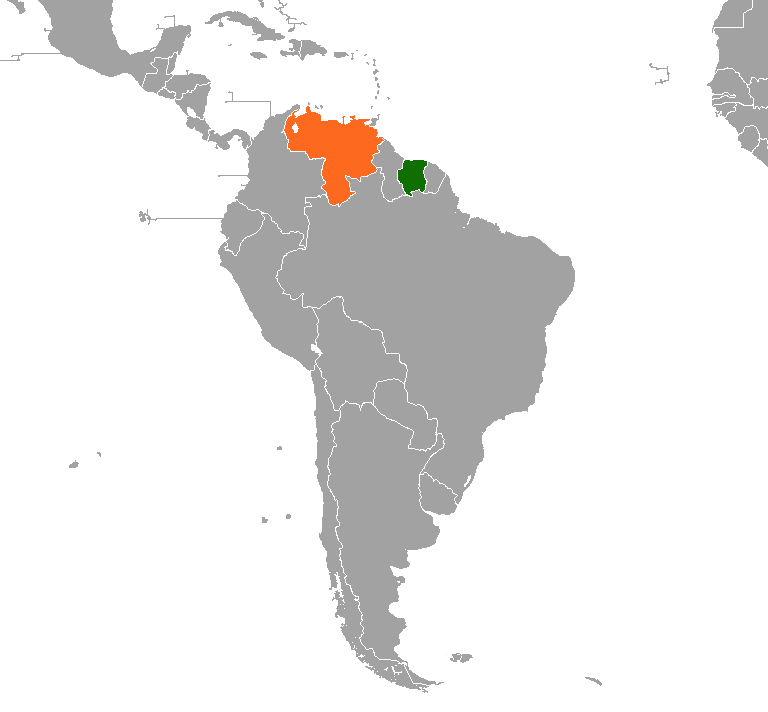
- Suriname: Venezuela

Diplomatic relations between Suriname and Venezuela were established in November 1975, shortly after the independence of Suriname. Suriname has an embassy in Caracas since 1976. Venezuela has an embassy in Paramaribo. As of 30 June 1978, there is no travel visa requirement between the two countries.

== History ==
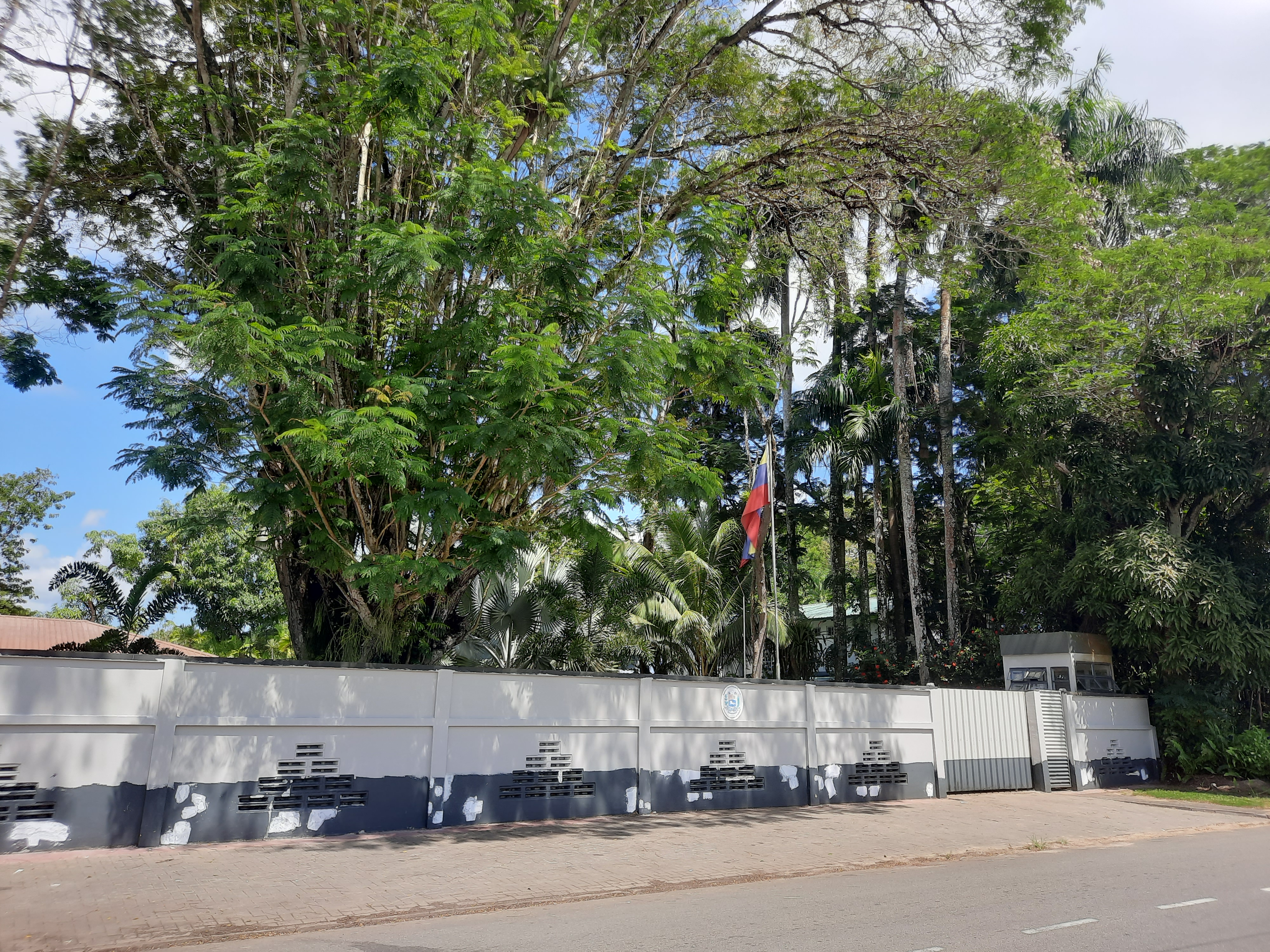
Embassy of Venezuela in Paramaribo

Since the Surinamese Desi Bouterse government (2010–2020), there has been friendly relationship between the two countries. Hugo Chávez congratulated Bouterse after his election victory. Chávez made an official visit to Suriname on 26 November 2010. Bouterse visited Venezuela in December 2011. In 2019, Suriname voted against an Organization of American States resolution to not recognize the Maduro Regime. The close relationship continued under Santokhi in 2020. During the visit of Mike Pompeo in September 2020, Santokhi expressed that there could be no discussion about actions against Venezuela, and that current crisis in Venezuela has to be resolved internally by the people of Venezuela.

== Trade ==
Trade between Suriname and Venezuela is limited. In 2019, Suriname exported US$1.95 million worth of goods to Venezuela with the main export product being rice. Venezuela exported US$2.87 million worth of good with the main product being oil. Exports from Venezuela to Suriname dropped substantially compared to 1995 when US$340 million was being exported.

== Migration ==
In the 2010s, the crisis in Venezuela resulted in a refugee crisis to other countries. The authorities in Suriname expressed concern because the Courantyne River which forms the border with Guyana is not well guarded, and easy to cross; however the number of migrants were limited. The migrants who did end up in Suriname mainly had to survive on their own.

== See also ==
- Foreign relations of Suriname
- Foreign relations of Venezuela
- Petrocaribe
