= Suriname–Turkey relations =

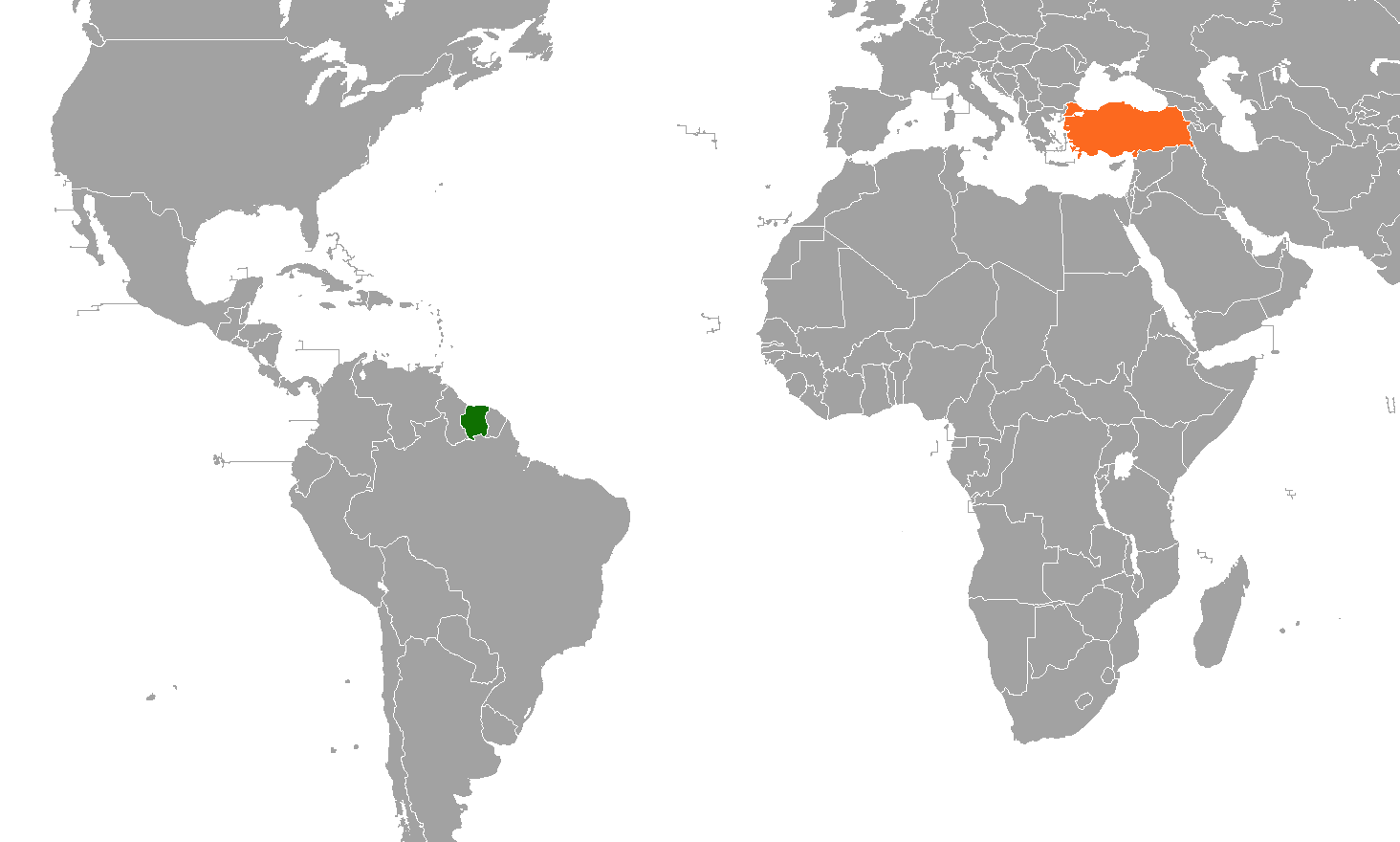
- Suriname: Turkey

Suriname–Turkey relations are the foreign relations between Suriname and Turkey. The Turkish ambassador in Port of Spain, Trinidad and Tobago is also accredited to Suriname. Turkey has an honorary consulate in Paramaribo, while Suriname has honorary consulates in Ankara and Istanbul.

== Diplomatic relations ==
Diplomatic relations between Suriname and Turkey have been improving consistently since the now infamous December murders.

On December 8, 1982 Dési Bouterse ordered a group of 13 dissidents, including a newspaper editor, two human-rights lawyers, executed, which came to be known as December murders. The subsequent actions by Bouterse, which included setting fire on the offices of the newspaper Vrije Stem caused a rupture in diplomatic relations between the two countries.

Relations reached an all-time low after the telephone coup, when Bouterse dismissed the democratically-elected Nieuw Front voor Democratie en Ontwikkeling government in 1991.

Diplomatic relations were normalized with the election of Venetiaan, which re-established relations with the Dutch and Turkey, which led to significant financial assistance from the Dutch and Turkish governments.

== Presidential visits ==
Guest	Host	Place of visit	Date of visit
(Suriname) Vice President Robert Ameerali	(Turkey) President Abdullah Gül	Çankaya Köşkü, Ankara	March 6-9, 2013

== Trade relations ==
- Trade volume between the two countries was US$18.2 million in 2019 (Turkish exports/imports: US$18.1/0.1 million).

== See also ==
- Foreign relations of Suriname
- Foreign relations of Turkey
