= Agriculture in Suriname =

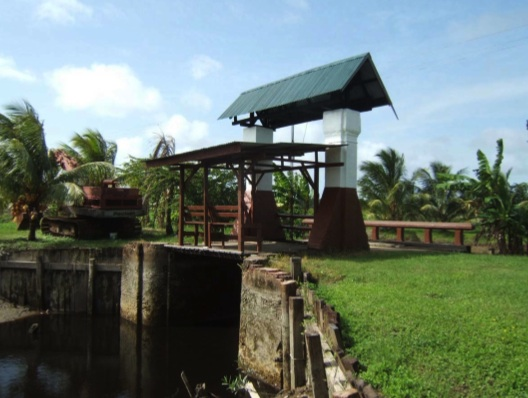

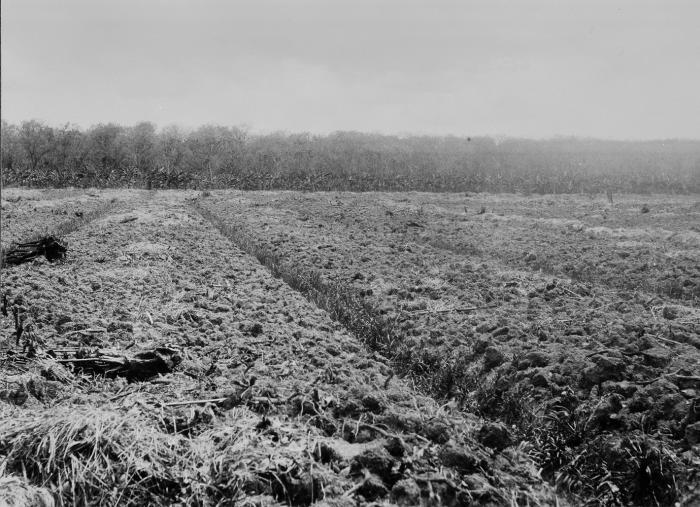

Agriculture in Suriname is the third largest industry in Suriname, in the economy, employing between 9-15% percent of the workforce, and account for 9% of GDP. Agriculture accounts for 40% of carbon emissions in Suriname, and is an important part of Suriname's policies as part of its Nationally Determined Contributions.

== Major crops ==
In 2018, Suriname produced 273 thousand tons of rice, 125 thousand tons of sugar cane, in addition to smaller productions of other agricultural products, such as banana (48 thousand tons), orange (19 thousand tons) and coconut (14 thousand tons).

Only 0.4 percent of Suriname's total land area is cultivable, with half of this devoted to rice production, which makes up around 10 percent of Suriname's total exports, with 180,000 tons produced in 1999. The banana industry also accounts for 2.5 percent of total export revenues, with 55,000 tonnes (54,000 long tons; 61,000 short tons) produced in 1999. Suriname also produces palm kernels, coconuts, sugar, plantains, peanuts, beef, chicken and shrimp. In the 18th century the production of coffee was of major importance under the Dutch colony but has gradually declined.

Since 1945, the Commission for the Application of Mechanized Techniques to Agriculture in Suriname has successfully brought new land under cultivation and redeveloped old plantations and improved the total agricultural production. Under union pressure, the government in early 1987 agreed to a national sugar plan to make production more efficient, and to create employment. The sugar industry is of major note in Guyana, especially the operations of Guyana Sugar Corporation since 1976, with 90,000 tons produced in 1999.

Fishing, especially for shellfish, is also important with wild-harvest shrimp accounting for US$29 million, or 6.7 percent of all exports in 1998 and the fishing industry overall creating annual revenues worth US$40–50 million.

== Effects of climate change ==
Though agriculture is a decreasing part of the total economy of the country, accounting for 9% of GDP in 2012, it is the third largest part of the Surinamese economy employing 15% of the population in 2009. Changing weather and flood events are expect to have significant negative effects on agriculture in the country. 49% of the economic losses of May 2006 floods in Suriname were agricultural.
