= Fidelia Graand-Galon =

Surinamese sociologue and former ambassador

- Fidelia Grand-Galon, ambassador of Suriname

Suriname Ambassador to Ghana
- In office 2022–Present
- Appointed by: Ronald Venetiaan
- Preceded by: Natasha Halfhuid

Suriname Ambassador to Trinidad and Tobago
- In office 2007–2015

Fidelia Graand-Galon (born 8 April 1959) is a Surinamese diplomat, sociologist, activists and Ambassador. In 2000 she was a co-founder of the Marron Women's Network. She is currently the Ambassador of Suriname to Ghana a position she has held since 2022. From 2007 to 2015 she was the Ambassador of Suriname to Trinidad and Tobago.

== Early life ==
Fidelia was born into a Maroon community in Moengo, Marowijne. She obtained her teaching diploma in 1992 at the IOL and her Doctorandus degree in Sociology at AdeKUS.

== Career ==
In November 2000, she co-founded the Marron Women Network, an organization focused on the empowerment and advocacy of Marron women. Additionally, she was a policy officer for gender and poverty programs.

=== Ambassadorial career ===
In 2007, she was appointed Suriname's ambassador to Trinidad and Tobago. During this period, she served as Dean of the Diplomatic Corps for three years. She remained in this position until November 2015 and then returned to the ministry in Paramaribo.

In February 2022, she was sworn in by President Chan Santokhi as future ambassador to Ghana. Since December 2023 and April 2024, she has also been sworn in as non-resident ambassador to Kenya and South Africa, respectively.

She was honored for a month in 2023 on the NAKS Icons Calendar.

== Awards ==
- 2005: Gaanman Gazon Matodja Award.
- 2014 Honorary Doctorate in Philosophy and Humanities from the College of Christian Education Department of the United Graduate College and Seminary International.
- 2014: Change Nations Global Leadership Award as Exemplary Global Leader, Trinidad.
- 2014: Golden Rule International Award, Trinidad.
