= Mexico–Suriname relations =

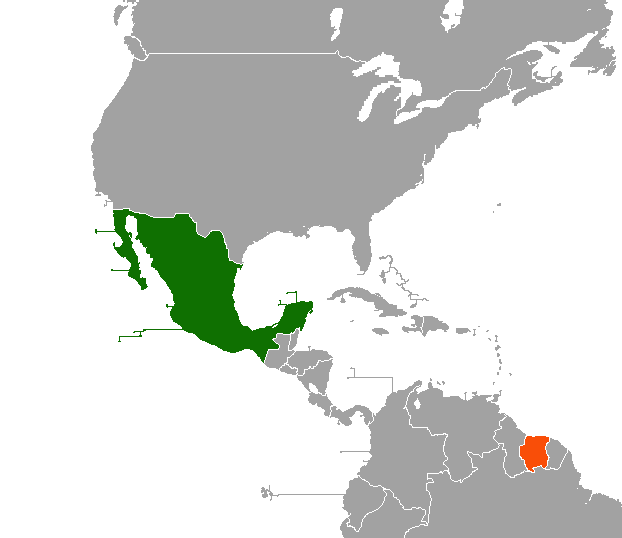

- Mexico: Suriname

The nations of Mexico and Suriname established diplomatic relations in 1975. Both nations are members of the Association of Caribbean States, Community of Latin American and Caribbean States, Organization of American States and the United Nations.

== History ==
Mexico and Suriname are two American nations with distinct colonial histories. Mexico, like many other nations in the region, was colonized by Spain and gained independence in 1821. Suriname is the only independent nation in the Americas to be colonized by and gain independence from the Netherlands. Immediately after gaining independence, both Mexico and Suriname established diplomatic relations on 25 November 1975. In 1982, Suriname opened an embassy in Mexico City, however, in 1986, due to budget restraints, Suriname closed its diplomatic mission and has since accredited its ambassador in Washington, D.C. to Mexico. Mexico has never opened an embassy in Paramaribo, however, it has always maintained an honorary consulate in the capital city.

In 2002, Surinamese President Ronald Venetiaan paid a visit to the city of Monterrey, Mexico to attend the Monterrey Special Summit of the Americas. While there, he met with Mexican President Vicente Fox. In April 2012, Surinamese President Dési Bouterse visited Puerto Vallarta, Mexico to attend the World Economic Forum on Latin America Summit hosted by Mexican President Felipe Calderón. That same year in May, Mexican President Felipe Calderón met again with President Dési Bouterse while both leaders were attending the Mexico-Caribbean Community Summit in Barbados.

In September 2021, Surinamese President Chan Santokhi paid a visit to Mexico to attend the Community of Latin American and Caribbean States in Mexico City. In April 2023, both nations held their first bilateral meeting for consultations on issues of shared interest.

== High-level Visits ==
High-level visits from Suriname to Mexico

- President Ronald Venetiaan (2002)
- President Dési Bouterse (2012)
- Foreign Minister Yldiz Pollack-Beighle (2020)
- President Chan Santokhi (2021)
- Foreign Minister Albert Ramdin (2021)

== Bilateral agreements ==
Both nations have signed a few bilateral agreements such as an Agreement on Scientific and Technical Cooperation (2012); Agreement of Cooperation in Agriculture and to train Surinamese diplomats in the Spanish language (2012) and a Memorandum of Understanding for the Establishment of a Consultation Mechanism on Matters of Common Interest (2021). Each year, Mexico provides government scholarships to Surinamese students to learn Spanish and/or to study for a master's degrees in Mexico.

== Trade relations ==
In 2023, two-way trade between Mexico and Suriname amounted to US$25.8 million. Mexico's main exports to Suriname include: tubes and pipes, iron and steel products, vehicles and tractors, malt extracts and oil. Suriname's main exports to Mexico include: hand adjustment keys, machinery and mechanical appliances, containers and clothing. Mexican multinational company Cemex operates in Suriname.

== Diplomatic missions ==
- Mexico is accredited to Suriname from its embassy in Port of Spain, Trinidad and Tobago and maintains an honorary consulate in Paramaribo.
- Suriname is accredited to Mexico from its embassy in Washington, D.C.; United States.
