= Germany–Suriname relations =

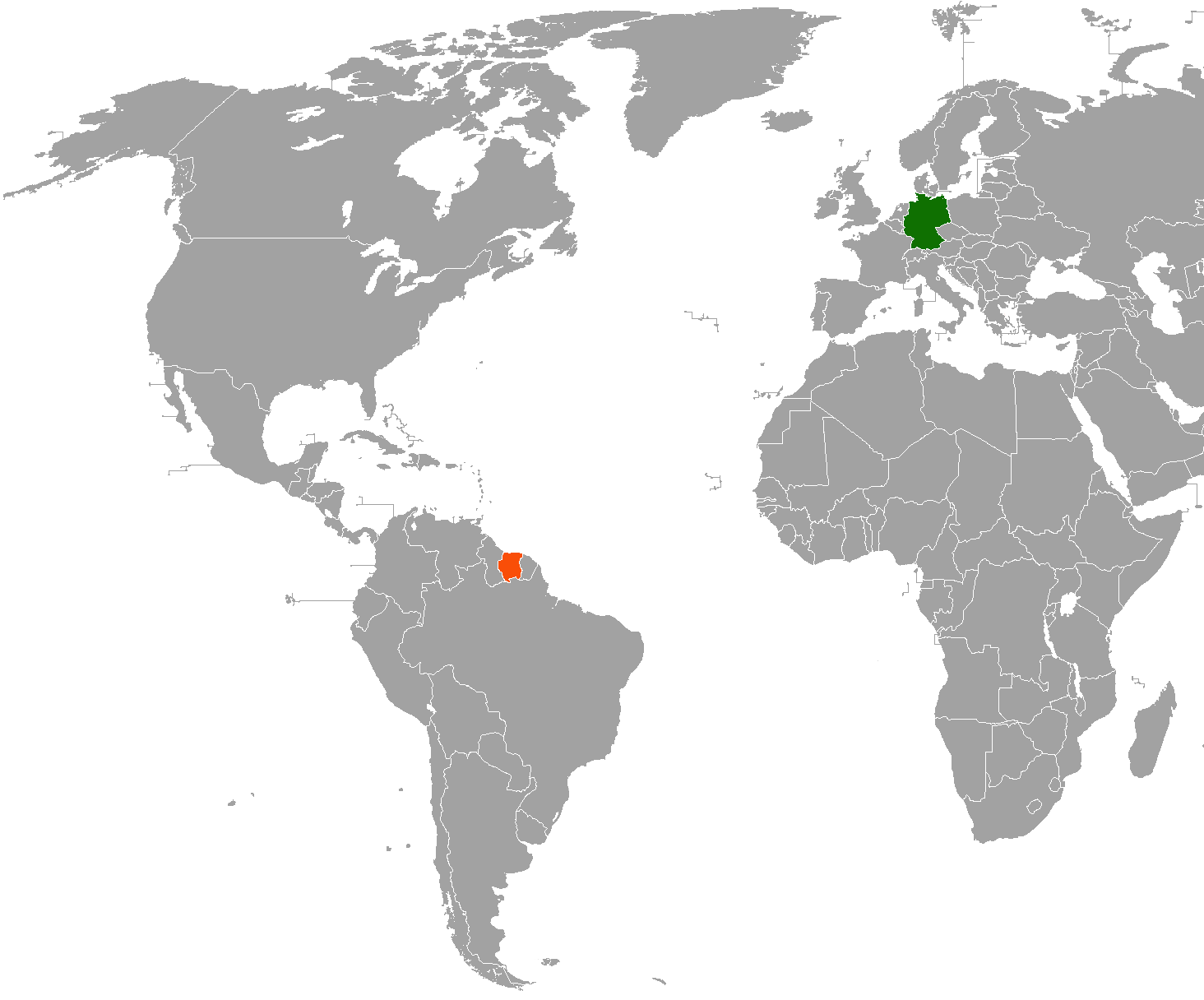

- Germany: Suriname

Germany–Suriname relations are relations between Germany and Suriname. The Federal Foreign Office describes the relations as “friendly”.

== History ==
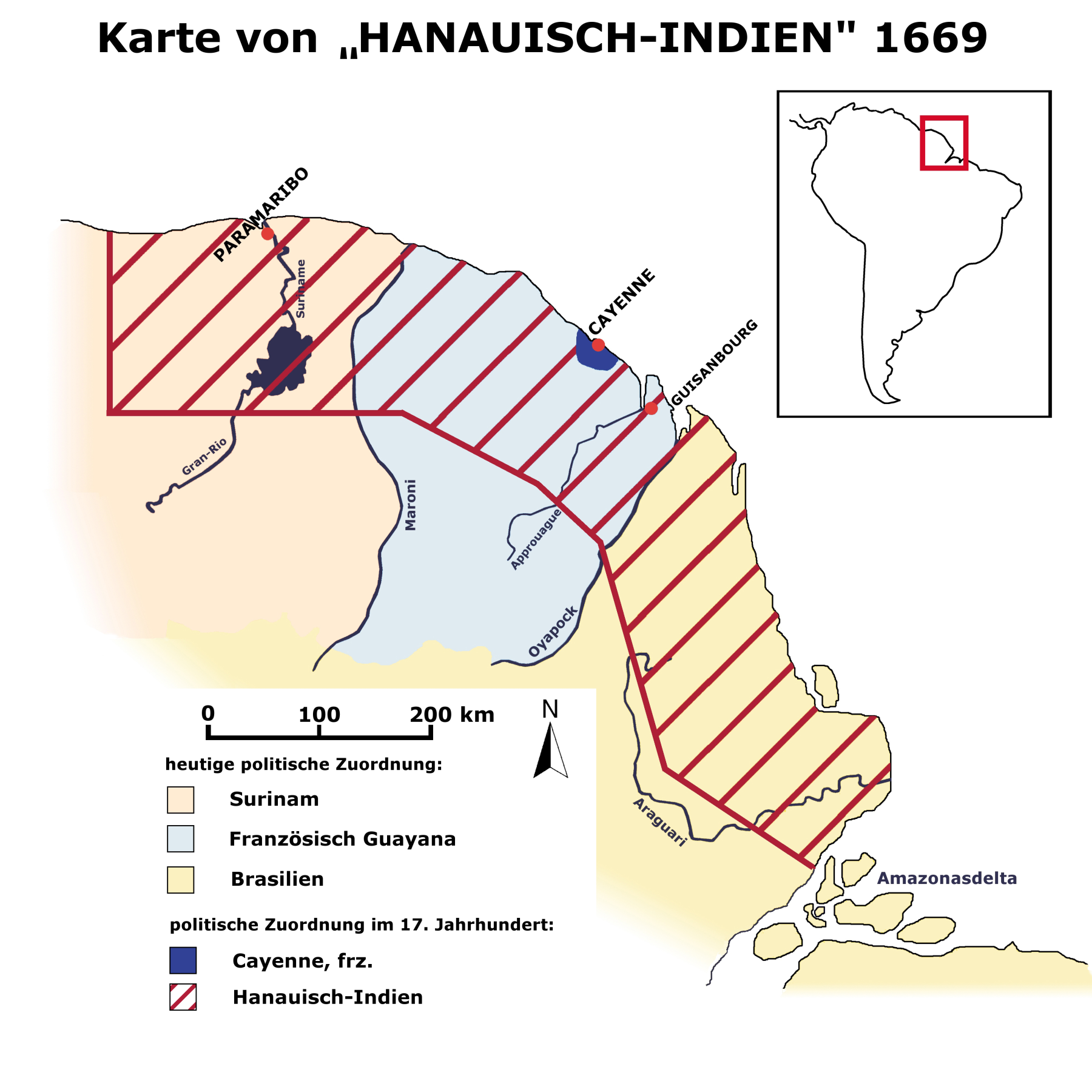
Map of the proposed colony of Hanau-India, 1669

=== Colonial plans of Hanau ===
In 1669, the Dutch West India Company and the County of Hanau signed a contract for the lease of an area of approximately 100,000 square kilometers between the Orinoco and Amazon rivers in Dutch Guiana. This area was intended to be many times larger than Hanau itself (at just under 1,400 square kilometers) in order to compensate for Hanau's financial difficulties through a positive trade balance with a colony. The contract granted extensive rights to the Dutch West India Company, including a transport monopoly with Hanauish-Indies. However, the funds to finance a project of this magnitude were lacking from the outset, as were people willing to colonize the huge area. The project ended in a financial fiasco for the County of Hanau. An attempt to sell it to King Charles II of England in 1672 failed, and the project finally collapsed with the outbreak of the Third Anglo-Dutch War that same year.

=== German merchants in Dutch Suriname ===
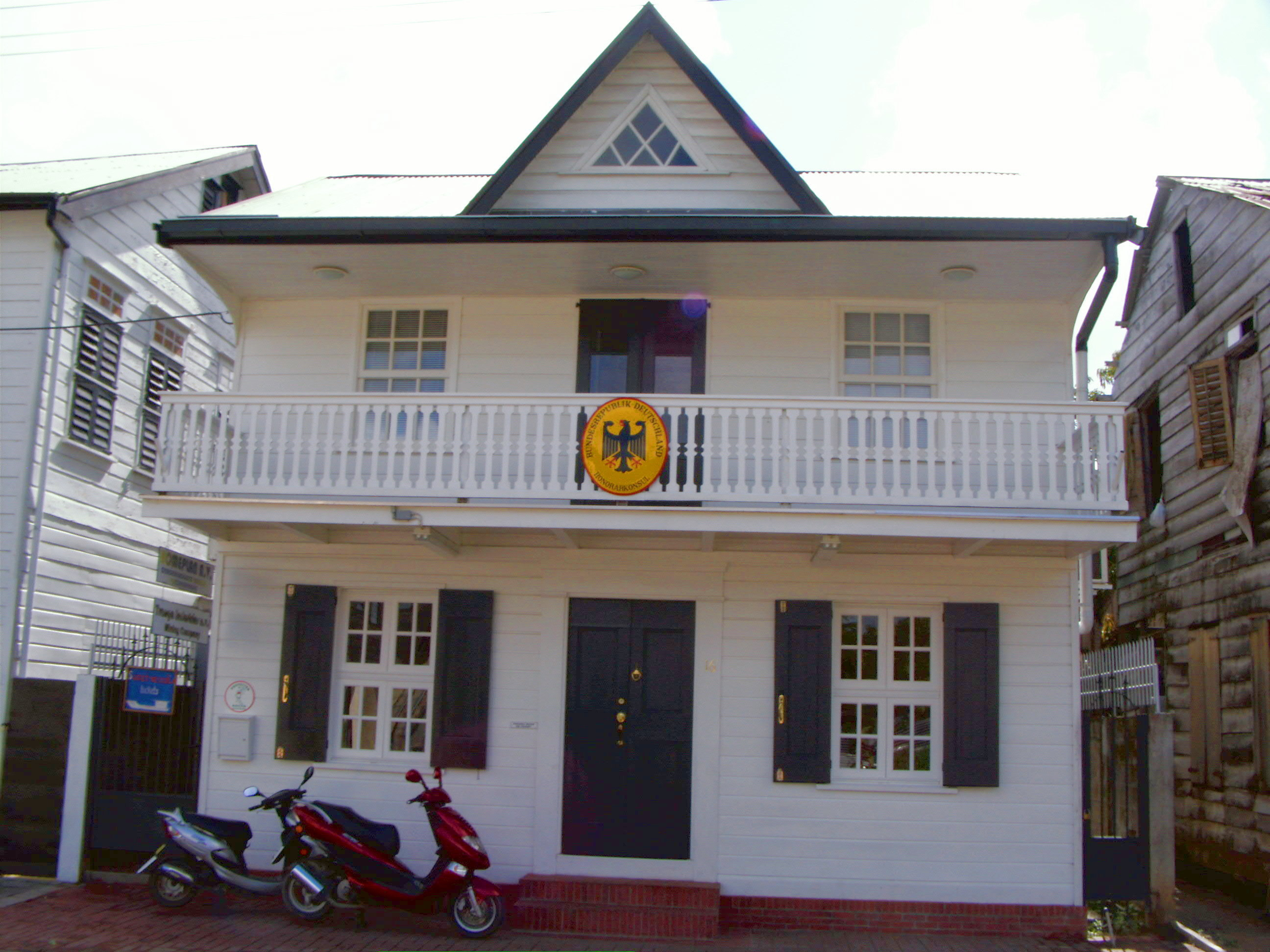
German Honorary Consulate in Paramaribo

In the 18th century, German maritime cities such as Altona, Hamburg and Bremen established trade contacts with Dutch Surinam. German merchants became active in the flourishing trade in coffee and other raw materials, and some Germans settled in Suriname in the slipstream of the Dutch colonization efforts, including missionaries of the Moravian Church. As early as 1754, a German sailor noted that ⁣⁣the numerous German settlers made Paramaribo look more like a German than a Dutch colony. Of the Germans who settled in the country, many built large plantation businesses, often run by African slaves. In 1751, a member of the German-born Meinertzhagen family became governor of Surinam. In 1800, there were 3,000 German and Portuguese Jews, as well as 1,800 Dutch, Germans, English and French, out of a population of 20,000. People of German origin later merged into Surinam's multicultural population.

=== Modern relations ===
After gaining independence from the Netherlands, Suriname established diplomatic relations with the Federal Republic of Germany in 1975 and with the German Democratic Republic in 1978. In 2008, an economic agreement was concluded between the European Union and the Caribbean Community (of which Suriname is a member). In 2012, a regular political dialog between Suriname and the European Union was agreed.

== Economic relations ==
In 2024, German exports of goods to Suriname amounted to 47.6 million euros and imports from the country to 3.3 million euros. Germany has financed development aid in Suriname through cooperation with the Caribbean Community, mainly in the areas of sustainable economic development, promotion of renewable energies, adaptation to climate change and promotion of biodiversity.

== Resident diplomatic missions ==
- Germany is accredited to Suriname from its embassy in Port of Spain, Trinidad and Tobago and maintains an honorary consulate in Paramaribo.
- Suriname is accredited to Germany from its embassy in Brussels, Belgium and maintains an honorary consulate in Berlin.

== See also ==
- Foreign relations of Germany
- Foreign relations of Suriname
