= Suriname–Trinidad and Tobago relations =

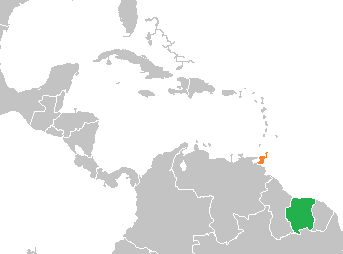

- Suriname: Trinidad and Tobago

Suriname–Trinidad and Tobago relations refers to the bilateral relations between Suriname and Trinidad and Tobago. Both countries have some of the highest percentages of citizens adhering to Hinduism and Islam in The Americas. Both nations are a part of CARICOM and the OAS. Trinidad and Tobago has a Consulate in Paramaribo.

== History ==
Both countries have a large Indian population, mainly the Indo-Trinidadian and Indo-Surinamese, due to importation of laborers from India when they were ruled by the British Empire. As a consequence both countries have significant cultural ties due to their populations being of similar origins. In 2017, Prime Minister Keith Rowley met with the Surinamese Government to discuss further economic and energy cooperation to bolster trade between the two nations, calling for a single market and economy for all CARICOM nations.

== Trade ==
Trinidad and Tobago exported US$113 Million worth of goods to Suriname in 2017, most of it being Liquefied petroleum gas. Suriname in the same year exported US$37 Million worth of goods to Trinidad and Tobago, with 77% of all exports being refined petroleum.

== See also ==
- Foreign relations of Suriname
- Foreign relations of Trinidad and Tobago
