= Foreign relations of Suriname =

As part of the foreign relations of Suriname, the country is a participant in numerous international organizations.

== Border disputes ==
The country claims an area in French Guiana between Litani River and Marouini River (both headwaters of the Lawa). Suriname also claims an area in Guyana between New (Upper Courantyne) and Courantyne/Koetari Rivers (all headwaters of the Courantyne).

== International organization participation ==
Suriname is a member of numerous international organizations. Among them, since gaining independence, Suriname has become a member of the UN, the OAS, and the Non-Aligned Movement. Suriname is a member of the Caribbean Community and Common Market and the Association of Caribbean States. It is associated with the European Union through the Lomé Convention. Suriname participates in the Amazonian Pact, a grouping of the countries of the Amazon basin that focuses on protection of the Amazon region's natural resources from environmental degradation.

Reflecting its status as a major bauxite producer, Suriname is a member of the International Bauxite Association. The country also belongs to the Caribbean Development Bank, the Economic Commission for Latin America, the Forum of East Asia–Latin America Cooperation, the Inter-American Development Bank, the International Finance Corporation, the World Bank, and the International Monetary Fund. Suriname became a member of the Islamic Development Bank in 1998, under the Wijdenbosch government. In 2003, Suriname joined the Nederlandse Taalunie (Dutch language union).

Suriname has been a member of the Forum of Small States (FOSS) since the group's founding in 1992.

== Regional and international agreements ==
Bilateral agreements with several countries of the region, covering diverse areas of cooperation, have underscored the government's interest in strengthening regional ties. The return to Suriname from French Guiana of about 8,000 refugees of the 1986–91 civil war between the military and domestic insurgents has improved relations with French authorities. Longstanding border disputes with Guyana and French Guiana remain unresolved. Negotiations with the Government of Guyana brokered by the Jamaican Prime Minister in 2000 did not produce an agreement but the countries agreed to restart talks after Guyanese national elections in 2001. In January 2002 the presidents of Suriname and Guyana met in Suriname and agreed to resume negotiations, establishing the Suriname-Guyana border commission to begin meeting in May 2002. An earlier dispute with Brazil ended amicably after formal demarcation of the border.

In May 1997, then-President Wijdenbosch joined US President Clinton and 14 other Caribbean leaders during the first-ever US-regional summit in Bridgetown, Barbados. The summit strengthened the basis for regional Partnership for Prosperity and Security in the Caribbean - Outlining a framework for cooperation on justice and counter narcotics issues, finance, development, and trade.

== Diplomatic relations ==
List of countries which Suriname maintains diplomatic relations with:

#	Country	Date
1	Ghana	24 November 1975
2	Guyana	24 November 1975
3	South Korea	24 November 1975
4	Germany	25 November 1975
5	Mexico	25 November 1975
6	Netherlands	25 November 1975
7	Venezuela	25 November 1975
8	India	23 January 1976
9	United States	23 January 1976
10	Indonesia	24 January 1976
11	Israel	24 February 1976
12	Brazil	3 March 1976
13	United Kingdom	31 March 1976
14	China	17 May 1976
15	Libya	17 May 1976
16	Syria	19 May 1976
17	Nicaragua	24 June 1976
18	Turkey	29 June 1976
19	Czech Republic	30 June 1976
20	Serbia	9 July 1976
21	Spain	9 July 1976
22	France	25 August 1976
23	Belgium	1 October 1976
24	Canada	2 November 1976
25	Japan	2 November 1976
26	Russia	2 November 1976
27	Greece	6 November 1976
28	Norway	27 January 1977
39	Barbados	7 February 1977
30	Egypt	23 February 1977
31	Romania	10 March 1977
32	Portugal	2 March 1977
33	Pakistan	7 April 1977
34	Austria	3 May 1977
35	Chile	7 May 1977
36	Hungary	7 May 1977
37	Argentina	23 June 1977
38	Gambia	17 October 1977
39	Trinidad and Tobago	16 January 1978
40	Iraq	25 February 1978
41	Sweden	15 March 1978
42	Bolivia	22 June 1978
43	Colombia	22 June 1978
44	Ecuador	22 June 1978
45	Peru	23 June 1978
46	Tanzania	30 June 1978
47	Costa Rica	1 March 1979
48	Dominica	1 March 1979
49	Dominican Republic	1 March 1979
50	El Salvador	1 March 1979
51	Guatemala	1 March 1979
52	Grenada	1 March 1979
53	Haiti	1 March 1979
54	Honduras	1 March 1979
55	Panama	1 March 1979
56	Uruguay	9 March 1979
57	Italy	15 March 1979
58	Cuba	23 March 1979
59	Switzerland	11 July 1979
60	Bahamas	29 August 1979
61	Nigeria	3 June 1980
62	Cyprus	25 July 1980
63	Saint Lucia	6 November 1980
64	Denmark	27 November 1980
65	Algeria	20 March 1982
66	North Korea	10 October 1982
67	Mozambique	10 October 1982
68	Bangladesh	8 November 1983
69	Togo	8 November 1983
70	Angola	6 September 1985
71	Zimbabwe	20 December 1985
72	Thailand	24 February 1987
73	Antigua and Barbuda	10 October 1989
74	Saint Vincent and the Grenadines	10 October 1989
75	Namibia	15 November 1990
76	Paraguay	20 November 1992
77	Poland	24 May 1993
78	Malaysia	2 July 1993
–	Holy See	16 February 1994
79	South Africa	3 February 1995
80	Lebanon	26 April 1995
81	Australia	19 January 1996
82	Singapore	15 April 1996
83	Slovenia	22 August 1997
84	Croatia	17 November 1997
85	Qatar	24 November 1997
86	Iran	11 December 1997
87	Philippines	16 December 1997
88	Vietnam	19 December 1997
89	Senegal	17 April 1998
90	Belize	13 May 1998
91	Brunei	22 February 1999
92	Saudi Arabia	24 February 1999
–	Sovereign Military Order of Malta	30 April 1999
93	Armenia	24 June 1999
94	Turkmenistan	25 June 1999
95	Oman	13 July 1999
96	Sudan	10 September 1999
97	United Arab Emirates	17 October 1999
98	Bahrain	10 November 1999
99	Azerbaijan	11 February 2000
100	Slovakia	12 March 2002
101	Morocco	28 July 2004
102	Bulgaria	20 September 2004
103	Iceland	9 November 2004
104	Estonia	21 June 2005
105	Finland	28 June 2005
106	Guinea	28 August 2006
107	Ukraine	20 September 2006
108	North Macedonia	12 April 2007
109	Botswana	6 December 2007
110	Maldives	23 October 2008
111	Latvia	20 May 2009
112	Belarus	2 June 2009
113	Luxembourg	1 February 2010
114	Montenegro	14 May 2010
115	Bosnia and Herzegovina	21 June 2010
116	Georgia	27 May 2011
117	Zambia	2 September 2011
118	Saint Kitts and Nevis	11 October 2011
119	Cambodia	31 October 2011
120	Fiji	21 December 2011
121	Equatorial Guinea	12 January 2012
122	Solomon Islands	10 August 2012
123	Samoa	16 November 2012
124	Sri Lanka	16 November 2012
125	Lithuania	26 March 2013
126	Moldova	5 April 2013
127	Kazakhstan	11 April 2013
128	Eswatini	7 June 2013
129	Mongolia	27 September 2013
130	New Zealand	25 March 2014
131	Ivory Coast	18 November 2015
132	Kyrgyzstan	23 September 2016
133	Tajikistan	2 October 2018
134	Nepal	11 October 2018
135	Kenya	24 September 2019
136	San Marino	8 October 2019
137	Rwanda	14 October 2019
138	Ireland	19 November 2019
139	Djibouti	21 February 2020
140	Mauritius	21 March 2022
141	Cape Verde	12 December 2022
142	Malta	18 May 2023
143	Kuwait	31 January 2024
144	Marshall Islands	28 May 2024
145	Seychelles	22 September 2024
146	Uzbekistan	21 February 2025
147	Burundi	17 April 2025
148	Benin	5 November 2026

== Bilateral relations ==
Country	Formal Relations Began	Notes
Barbados	8 March 1978	See Barbados–Suriname relations Both countries established diplomatic relations on 8 March 1978. In 2009 both nations formed a Joint Commission to improve relations between both countries and expand in various areas of cooperation.: Barbados is accredited to Suriname from Bridgetown and has an honorary consulate in Paramaribo.; Suriname is accredited to Barbados from its embassy in Port of Spain, Trinidad and Tobago and has an honorary consulate in Bridgetown.
Brazil		See Brazil–Suriname relations: Brazil has an embassy in Paramaribo.; Suriname has an embassy in Brasília, and a consulate in Belém.
Canada	1975	Both countries established diplomatic relations in November 1975.; Both country are full members of the Organization of American States.
China		See China–Suriname relations
Cuba		See Cuba–Suriname relations: Cuba has an embassy in Paramaribo.; Suriname has an embassy in Havana.
France		See France–Suriname relations: France has an embassy in Paramaribo.; Suriname has an embassy in Paris and a consulate-general in Cayenne.
Germany	25 November 1975	See Germany–Suriname relations
Ghana	24 November 1975	See Ghana–Suriname relations
Guyana		See Guyana–Suriname relations
India		See India–Suriname relations: India has an embassy in Paramaribo.; Suriname has an embassy in New Delhi.
Indonesia		See Indonesia–Suriname relations: Indonesia has an embassy in Paramaribo.; Suriname has an embassy in Jakarta.
Mexico	1975	See Mexico–Suriname relations: Mexico is accredited to Suriname from its embassy in Port of Spain, Trinidad and Tobago and has an honorary consulate in Paramaribo.; Suriname is accredited to Mexico from its embassy in Washington, D.C.; United States.
Netherlands	25 November 1975	See Netherlands–Suriname relations: Netherlands has an embassy in Paramaribo.; Suriname has an embassy in The Hague and consulates-general in Amsterdam and in Willemstad, Curaçao.
Russia		The nations have begun discussing cooperation in the areas of agriculture, fishing, shipbuilding, education, along with trade. In October 2013, the Surinamese foreign minister, Yldiz Pollack-Beighle visited Moscow for talks on concluding military and joint law enforcement training.
Switzerland	1979	See Suriname–Switzerland relations
Trinidad and Tobago		See Suriname–Trinidad and Tobago relations
Turkey	1976	See Suriname–Turkey relations: Turkey is accredited to Suriname from its embassy in Port of Spain, Trinidad and Tobago.; Trade volume between the two countries was US$18.2 million in 2019 (Suriname's exports/imports: 0.1/18.1 million USD).
United Kingdom	1976	See Suriname–United Kingdom relations Suriname established diplomatic relations with the United Kingdom on 31 March 1976.: Suriname does not maintain an embassy in the UK.; The United Kingdom is not accredited to Suriname through an embassy; the UK develops relations through its high commission in Georgetown, Guyana.; England governed Suriname from 1650 to 1667, when Suriname was ceded to the Netherlands. The UK occupied Suriname from 1799 until 1816. Both countries share common membership of the Atlantic Co-operation Pact, the Caribbean Development Bank, the International Criminal Court, the United Nations, and the World Trade Organization, as well as the CARIFORUM–United Kingdom Economic Partnership Agreement.
United States		See Suriname–United States relations: Suriname has an embassy in Washington, D.C., and a consulate-general in Miami.; United States has an embassy in Paramaribo.
Venezuela		See Suriname–Venezuela relations: Suriname has an embassy in Caracas.; Venezuela has an embassy in Paramaribo.

== See also ==
- List of diplomatic missions in Suriname
- List of diplomatic missions of Suriname
