= Niermala Badrising =

Surinamese diplomat and politician

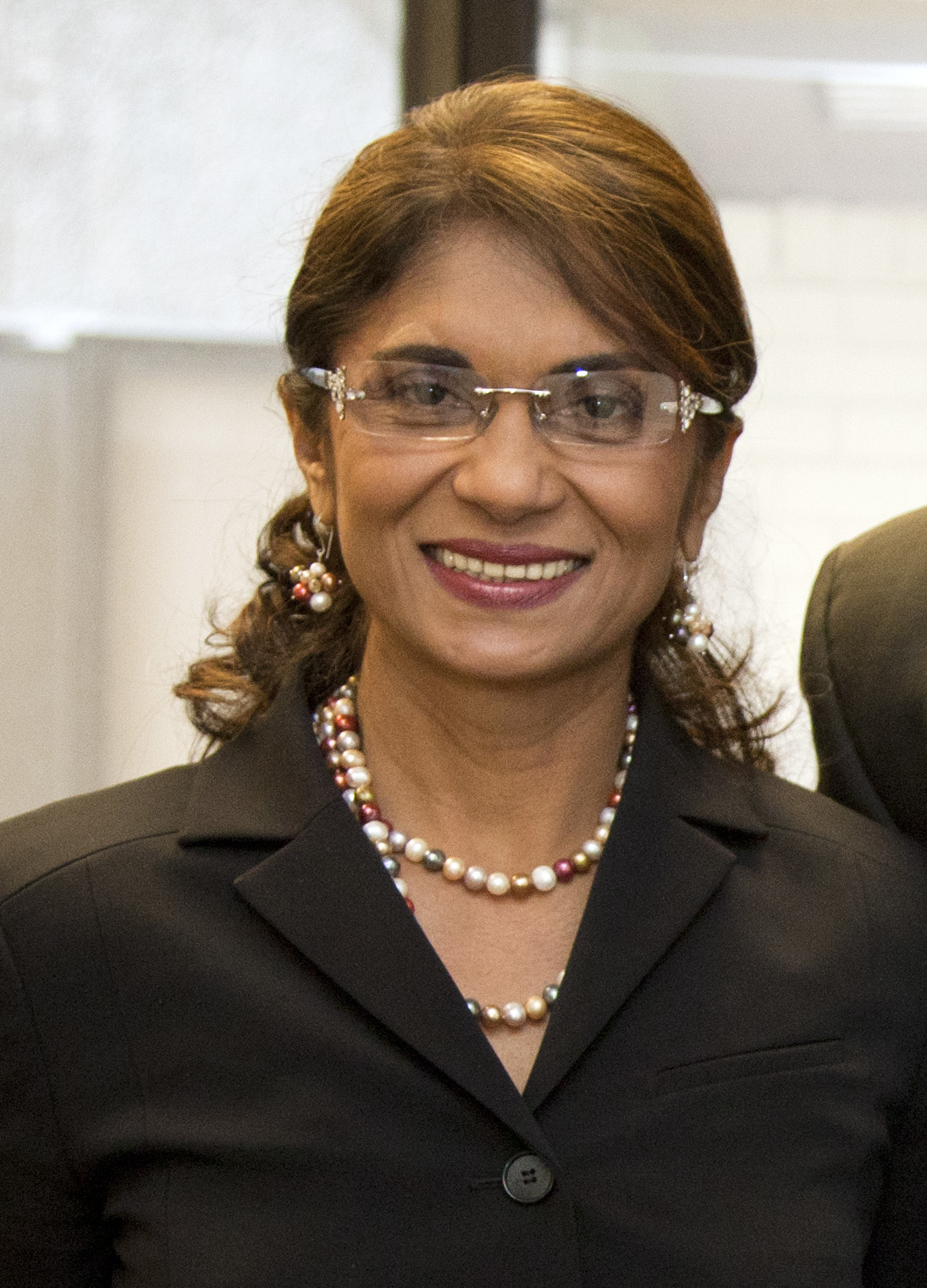
- Badrising in 2013

Ambassador of Suriname to the United States
- In office 21 July 2017 – October 2021
- Preceded by: Subhas Mungra
- Succeeded by: Marten Schalkwijk

Minister of Foreign Affairs
- In office 12 August 2015 – 1 February 2017
- President: Dési Bouterse
- Preceded by: Winston Lackin
- Succeeded by: Yldiz Pollack-Beighle

Personal details
- Born: 4 July 1962 (age 64) Paramaribo, Suriname
- Education: Anton de Kom University of Suriname; International Institute of Social Studies; Fletcher School of Law and Diplomacy

Niermala Badrising (born 4 July 1962) is a Surinamese diplomat and politician. She was Minister of Foreign Affairs of Suriname in the cabinet of President Dési Bouterse between 12 August 2015 and 1 February 2017. She was ambassador to the United States from July 2017 until October 2021.

== Early life and education ==
Badrising was born on 4 July 1962 in Paramaribo. In 1987 Badrising obtained a master's degree in International Studies from the International Institute of Social Studies in The Hague, Netherlands. In 2007 she obtained a master's degree in International Relations and Diplomacy from the Fletcher School of Law and Diplomacy of Tufts University in the United States. She also has a licentiate degree in law from the Anton de Kom University of Suriname, where she specialized in international labor law and international relations.

== Career ==
Badrising started working for the Ministry of Foreign Affairs in 1989. She kept working there until 1996, which included a term as Head of the United Section at the Department of International Organizations. Between 1998 and 2012 Badrising worked as senior advisor and chief coordinator at the Office of the President of Suriname.

In November 2011 Badrising was appointed Permanent Representative of Suriname to the Organization of American States, with co-accreditations to the Inter-American Development Bank and Worldbank. She assumed her position in January 2012.

On 13 August 2015 she took over the position of Minister of Foreign Affairs from Winston Lackin. In this position she was Suriname's signatory to the 2015 Paris Agreement. On 1 February 2017 she was replaced as Minister by Yldiz Pollack-Beighle. The Surinamese government subsequently proposed her as the ambassador to the United States. She started working as ambassador on 9 June of the same year, and offered her diplomatic credentials to President Donald Trump on 21 July 2017. She was the first female in this position and left the post in October 2021.

== See also ==
- List of foreign ministers in 2017
