= Obina Shok =

Brazilian pop band

- Origin: Brasília, Distrito Federal, Brazil
- Genres: Pop
- Years active: 1985–1988
- Labels: RCA Records

Obina Shok was a Brazilian pop band.

== History ==
The band was formed in 1985, in the city of Brasília, capital of Brazil; three of its members were foreigners, and related to embassy workers: Jean Pierre Senghor is Senegalese (and grandson of president Leopold Senghor); Roger Kedy, Gabonese; and Winston Lackin, Surinamese; the other members were Brazilian. Their style was a mix of pop with Caribbean, African and Brazilian rhythms. The name of the band, in Myene, means "path of dance".

Their first claim to fame was a demo tape of the song "Lambarine", sent to then influential Rádio Fluminense FM of Niterói, state of Rio de Janeiro - which received notable airtime. With increasing popularity, they performed at the famous concert house Circo Voador.

Soon they'd sign with RCA Victor and released their first, eponymously titled album in 1986, which was successful and very well received by critics. Their next album, however, failed to repeat such success, and the group split up the following year.

== Discography ==
- 1986 - Obina Shok
- 1987 - Sallé

== Line-up ==
- Jean Pierre Senghor - vocals, keyboard
- Roger Kedy - guitar, vocals
- Henrique Hermeto - guitar, vocals
- Sérgio Galvão - alto sax
- Maurício Lagos - bass
- Winston Lackin - drums
- Sérgio Couto - percussion
- Hélio Franco - percussion

== Sources ==
- https://radicaos.blogspot.com/2007/09/obina-shok.html
- https://cogumelomoonpoprock80brasil.blogspot.com/2007/02/obina-shok.html
