= Geography of Suriname =

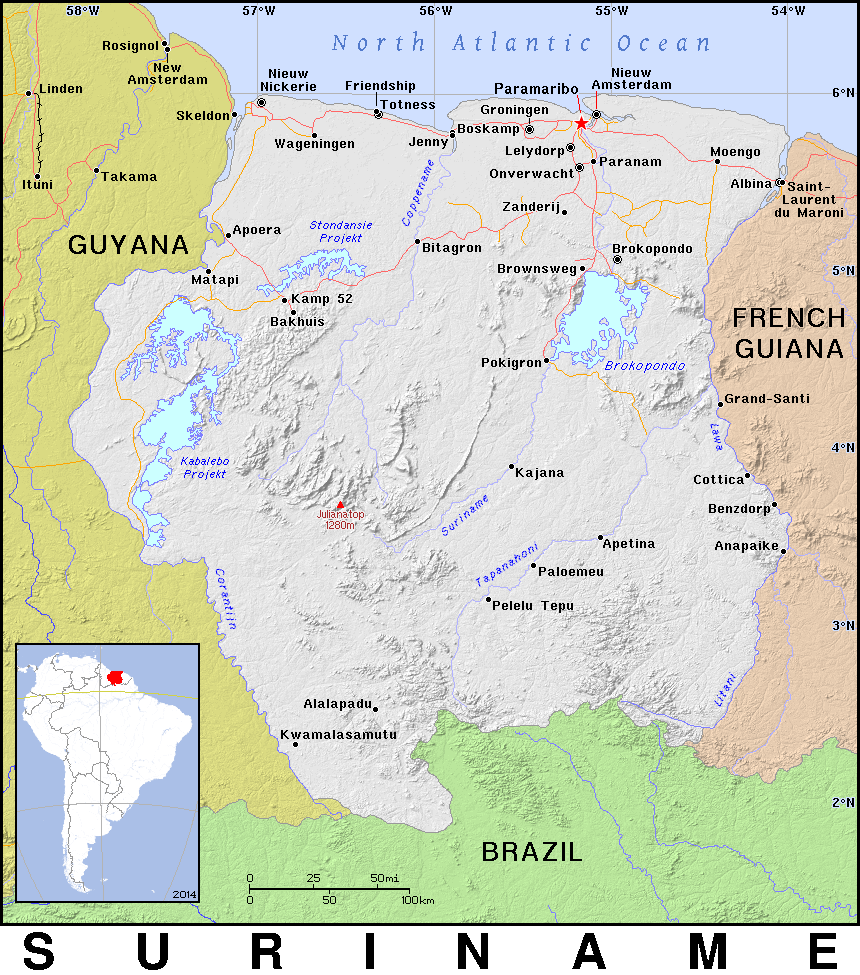
- Continent: South America
- Region: Caribbean
- Coordinates: 4°00′N 56°00′W
- Area: Ranked 90th
  - Total: 163,820 km^{2} (63,250 sq mi)
  - Land: 95.33%
  - Water: 4.67%
- Coastline: 386 km (240 mi)
- Borders: total length 1,707 km (1,061 mi)
- Highest point: Juliana Top; 1,230 meters (4,040 ft)
- Lowest point: Caribbean Sea; 0 metres (0 ft)
- Longest river: Courantyne River; 724 km (450 mi)
- Largest lake: Brokopondo Reservoir; 1,560 km (970 mi)
- Exclusive economic zone: 127,772 km^{2} (49,333 mi^{2})

Topographic map of Suriname and EEZ (exclusive economic zone).

Suriname is located in the northern part of South America and is part of Caribbean South America, bordering the North Atlantic Ocean, between French Guiana and Guyana. It is mostly covered by tropical rainforest, containing a great diversity of flora and fauna that, for the most part, are increasingly threatened by new development. There is a relatively small population, most of which live along the coast.

There are currently two unresolved border disputes that affect the geography of Suriname, namely the Tigri Area in the southwestern region near Guyana and also the Marouini/Litani region with French Guiana in the southeast.

== Location ==
Geographic coordinates: 4°00′N 56°00′W

Continent: South America

=== Area ===
Total: 163,820 square kilometers (63,250 sq mi)
Land: 156,000 square kilometers (60,000 sq mi)
Water: 7,820 square kilometers (3,020 sq mi)

Area - comparative: See order of magnitude 1 E+11 m². Slightly larger than Tunisia.

=== Land boundaries ===
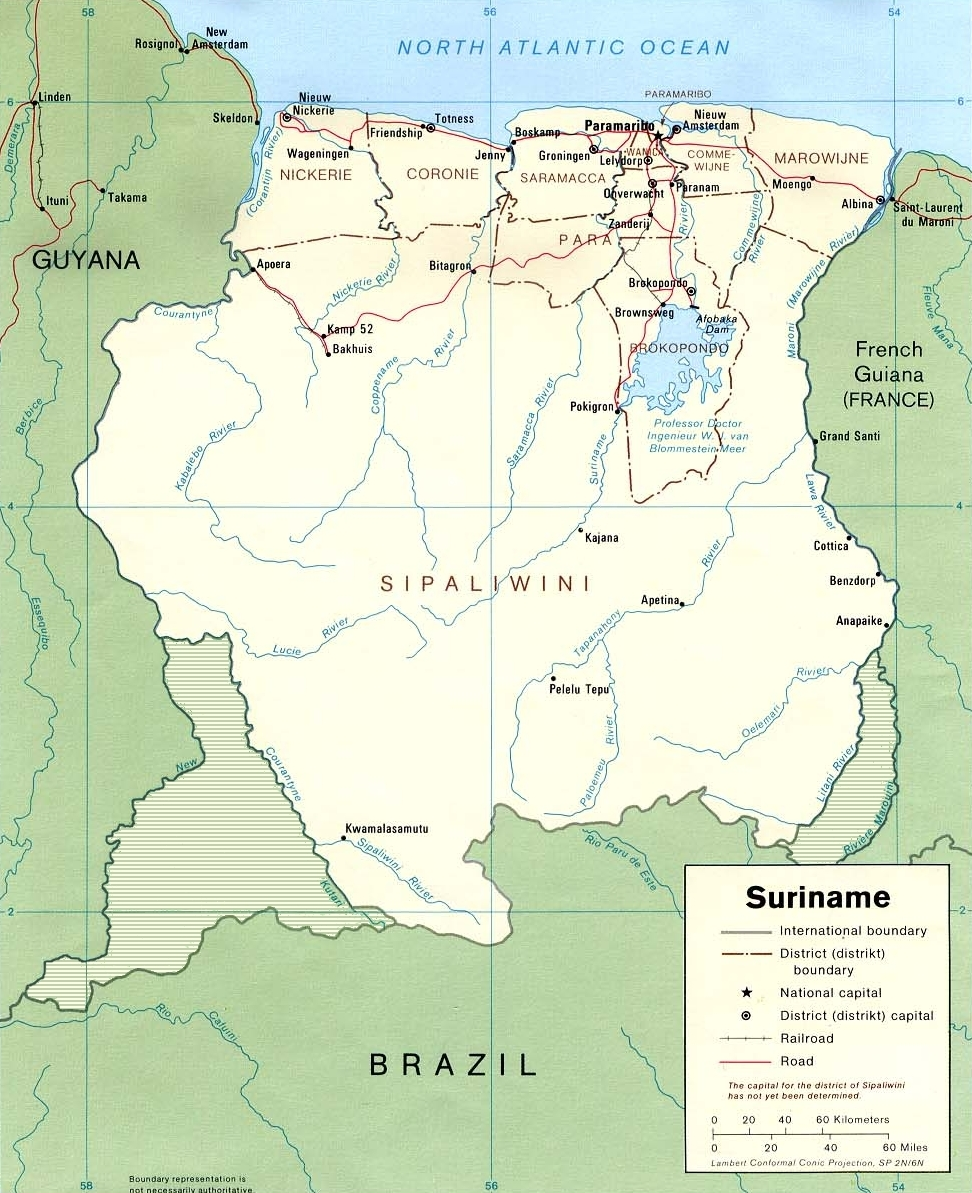
Suriname with the disputed areas, including the Tigri Area controlled by Guyana and southeastern area controlled by French Guiana.

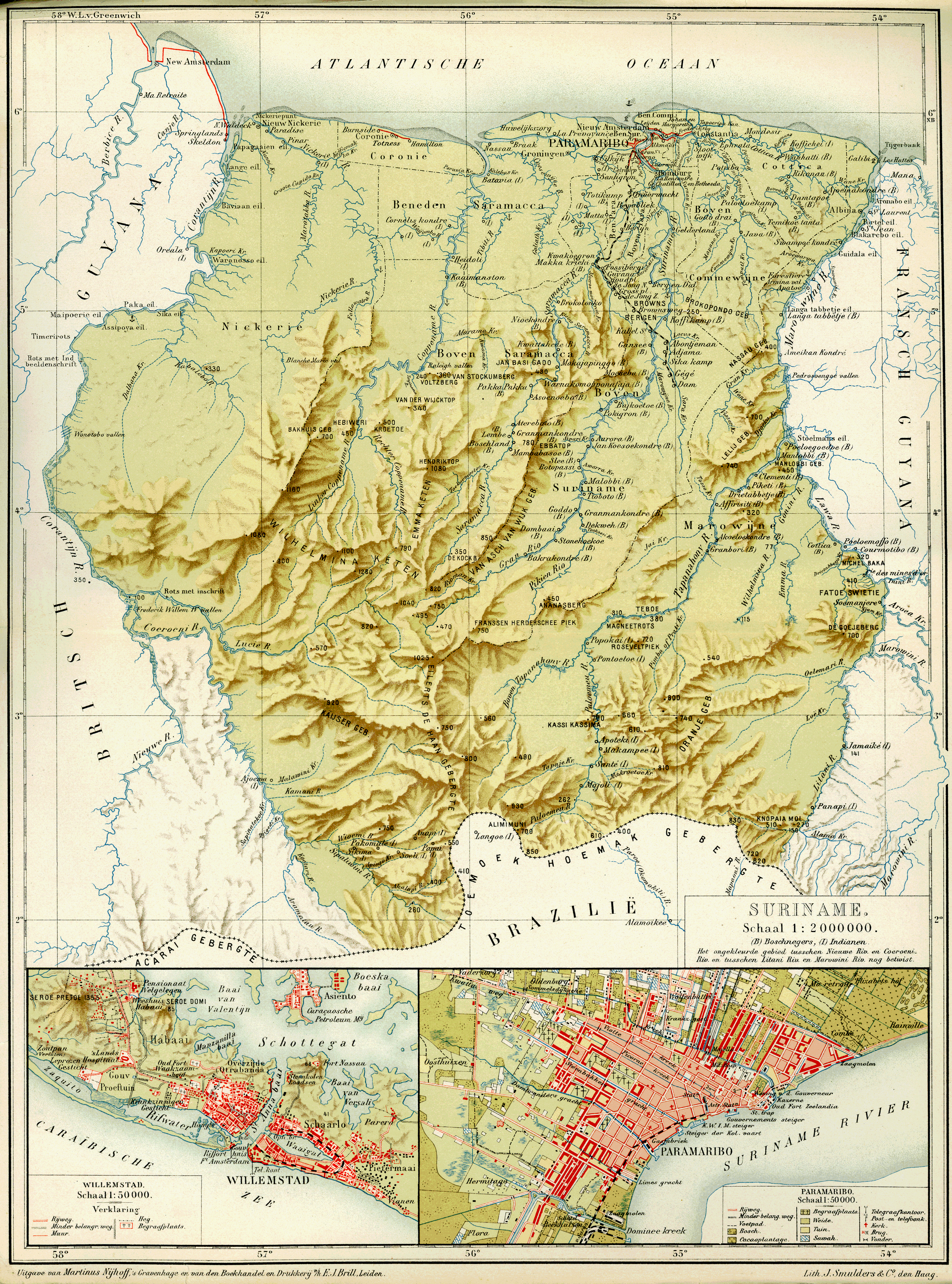
Suriname (circa 1914) in the Encyclopedia of the Dutch West Indies, by Surinamese cartographer Herman Benjamins and Dutch ethnographer Johannes Snelleman.

Total: 1,703 kilometers (1,058 mi)

Border countries:

- Brazil - 593 kilometers (368 mi)
- French Guiana - 510 kilometers (320 mi)
- Guyana - 600 kilometers (370 mi)

Coastline: 386 kilometers (240 mi)

=== Maritime claims ===
Exclusive economic zone: 127,772 km^{2} (49,333 mi^{2}) and 200 nmi (370.4 km; 230.2 mi)

Territorial sea: 12 nmi (22.2 km; 13.8 mi)

== Climate and climate change ==
Suriname has a tropical rainforest climate and a tropical monsoon climate, with hot humid conditions year-round.

Climate change in both Suriname and the wider world is leading to hotter temperatures and more extreme weather. As a fairly poor country, its contributions to global climate change have been limited. Suriname has a large forest cover, the country has been running a carbon negative economy since 2014. Hotter temperatures and changes in precipitation trends are predicted because of climate change.

Climate data for Paramaribo
Month	Jan	Feb	Mar	Apr	May	Jun	Jul	Aug	Sep	Oct	Nov	Dec	Year
Record high °C (°F)	33 (91)	34 (93)	35 (95)	37 (99)	37 (99)	36 (97)	37 (99)	37 (99)	36 (97)	37 (99)	36 (97)	36 (97)	37 (99)
Mean daily maximum °C (°F)	30 (86)	30 (86)	30 (86)	31 (88)	30 (86)	31 (88)	31 (88)	32 (90)	33 (91)	33 (91)	32 (90)	30 (86)	31 (88)
Daily mean °C (°F)	26 (79)	26 (79)	26 (79)	27 (81)	27 (81)	27 (81)	27 (81)	27 (81)	28 (82)	28 (82)	27 (81)	26 (79)	27 (81)
Mean daily minimum °C (°F)	22 (72)	22 (72)	22 (72)	22 (72)	23 (73)	22 (72)	22 (72)	23 (73)	23 (73)	23 (73)	23 (73)	22 (72)	22 (72)
Record low °C (°F)	17 (63)	17 (63)	17 (63)	18 (64)	19 (66)	20 (68)	20 (68)	15 (59)	21 (70)	20 (68)	21 (70)	18 (64)	15 (59)
Average rainfall mm (inches)	200 (7.9)	140 (5.5)	150 (5.9)	210 (8.3)	290 (11.4)	290 (11.4)	230 (9.1)	170 (6.7)	90 (3.5)	90 (3.5)	120 (4.7)	180 (7.1)	2,160 (85)
Source: Weatherbase

Climate data for Nieuw Nickerie
Month	Jan	Feb	Mar	Apr	May	Jun	Jul	Aug	Sep	Oct	Nov	Dec	Year
Record high °C (°F)	32.5 (90.5)	32.4 (90.3)	32.5 (90.5)	33.2 (91.8)	34.8 (94.6)	34.0 (93.2)	34.5 (94.1)	35.6 (96.1)	35.4 (95.7)	36.3 (97.3)	34.9 (94.8)	33.8 (92.8)	36.3 (97.3)
Mean daily maximum °C (°F)	28.9 (84.0)	29.0 (84.2)	29.2 (84.6)	29.5 (85.1)	29.8 (85.6)	29.8 (85.6)	30.3 (86.5)	31.1 (88.0)	31.7 (89.1)	31.7 (89.1)	30.9 (87.6)	29.8 (85.6)	30.1 (86.2)
Daily mean °C (°F)	26.5 (79.7)	26.6 (79.9)	26.9 (80.4)	27.2 (81.0)	27.2 (81.0)	27.1 (80.8)	27.2 (81.0)	27.8 (82.0)	28.3 (82.9)	28.2 (82.8)	27.8 (82.0)	27.0 (80.6)	27.3 (81.1)
Mean daily minimum °C (°F)	23.5 (74.3)	23.7 (74.7)	24.0 (75.2)	24.2 (75.6)	24.2 (75.6)	23.9 (75.0)	23.7 (74.7)	24.0 (75.2)	24.2 (75.6)	24.0 (75.2)	23.9 (75.0)	23.7 (74.7)	24.0 (75.2)
Record low °C (°F)	18.3 (64.9)	18.2 (64.8)	19.1 (66.4)	19.9 (67.8)	20.7 (69.3)	20.6 (69.1)	20.9 (69.6)	19.9 (67.8)	20.9 (69.6)	20.3 (68.5)	20.0 (68.0)	20.1 (68.2)	18.2 (64.8)
Average rainfall mm (inches)	191 (7.5)	114 (4.5)	111 (4.4)	191 (7.5)	246 (9.7)	316 (12.4)	266 (10.5)	168 (6.6)	61 (2.4)	61 (2.4)	79 (3.1)	176 (6.9)	1,980 (77.9)
Average relative humidity (%)	82	81	80	80	82	83	82	80	78	78	79	82	81
Source: Deutscher Wetterdienst

== Terrain ==
Most of the country is made up of rolling hills, but there is a narrow coastal plain that has swampy terrain.

A recent global remote sensing analysis suggested that there were 781 km² of tidal flats in Suriname, making it the 34th ranked country in terms of tidal flat area.

Elevation extremes

Lowest point: Unnamed location in the coastal plain - 2 meters (6.6 ft) below Sea Level.
Highest point: Juliana Top - 1,230 meters (4,040 ft)

=== Natural resources ===
Timber, hydropower, fish, forests, hydroelectric potential, kaolin, shrimp, bauxite and gold. Small amounts of nickel, copper, platinum and iron ore. It also has sizeable oil.

=== Water ===
The country has one large reservoir, the Brokopondo Reservoir. Several rivers run through it, including the Suriname River, Nickerie River and Maroni or Marowijne River.

=== Land use ===
(2018 Estimates)

Arable land: 0.4%
Permanent crops: 0.0%
permanent pasture: 0.1%
forest: 94.6%
Other: 4.9%

==== Irrigated land ====
510 square kilometers (200 sq mi) (2003)

==== Natural hazards ====
Tropical Showers, no hurricanes.

== Environment ==
Share of forest area in total land area, top countries (2021). Suriname has the highest percentage of forest cover in the world.

=== Current issues ===
Deforestation is a real problem as timber is cut for export. There is also a lot of pollution of inland waterways by small-scale mining activities.

=== Climate change ===
Köppen climate classification map for Suriname for 1991–2020

2071–2099 map under the most intense climate change scenario. Mid-range scenarios are currently considered more likely

Climate change in Suriname is leading to warmer temperatures and more extreme weather events in Suriname. As a relatively poor country, its contributions to global climate change have been limited. Because of the large forest cover, the country has been running a carbon negative economy since 2014.

Suriname was the second country to update its Nationally Determined Contributions in 2020.

=== International agreements ===
Suriname has agreed to the following agreements: Biodiversity, Climate Change, Endangered Species, Kyoto Protocol, Law of the Sea, Marine Dumping--London Convention, Marine Dumping--London Protocol, Ozone Layer Protection, Paris Accords Ship Pollution, Tropical Timber 94, Wetlands, Whaling

=== Deforestation ===
==== Tree cover extent and loss ====
Global Forest Watch publishes annual estimates of tree cover loss and 2000 tree cover extent derived from time-series analysis of Landsat satellite imagery in the Global Forest Change dataset. In this framework, tree cover refers to vegetation taller than 5 m (including natural forests and tree plantations), and tree cover loss is defined as the complete removal of tree cover canopy for a given year, regardless of cause.

For Suriname, country statistics report cumulative tree cover loss of 286,262 ha (2,862.62 km^{2}) from 2001 to 2024 (about 2.1% of its 2000 tree cover area). For tree cover density greater than 30%, country statistics report a 2000 tree cover extent of 13,949,796 ha (139,497.96 km^{2}). The charts and table below display this data. In simple terms, the annual loss number is the area where tree cover disappeared in that year, and the extent number shows what remains of the 2000 tree cover baseline after subtracting cumulative loss. Forest regrowth is not included in the dataset.

Annual tree cover loss in Suriname, 2001–2024. View chart definition.
Tree cover extent in 2000 minus cumulative tree cover loss in Suriname, 2001–2024 (loss-only residual; does not account for gain). View chart definition.

Annual tree cover extent and loss
Year	Tree cover extent (km2) (Note: This residual measure does not include forest regrowth.)	Annual tree cover loss (km2)
2001	139,461.06	36.90
2002	139,423.88	37.18
2003	139,378.44	45.44
2004	139,324.22	54.22
2005	139,289.10	35.12
2006	139,255.05	34.05
2007	139,218.79	36.26
2008	139,143.69	75.10
2009	139,070.07	73.62
2010	139,000.07	70.00
2011	138,943.10	56.97
2012	138,748.08	195.02
2013	138,646.04	102.04
2014	138,498.57	147.47
2015	138,379.36	119.21
2016	138,210.58	168.78
2017	138,030.40	180.18
2018	137,840.38	190.02
2019	137,655.84	184.54
2020	137,504.87	150.97
2021	137,382.24	122.63
2022	137,236.83	145.41
2023	136,975.67	261.16
2024	136,635.34	340.33

==== REDD+ reference levels and monitoring ====
Under the UNFCCC REDD+ framework, Suriname has submitted three national reference-level packages. On the UNFCCC REDD+ Web Platform, the country's 2018 and 2021 packages are listed as having assessed reference levels, while a 2024 package is listed as under technical assessment. All three list a national strategy and safeguards information; a national forest monitoring system is listed as reported for the 2018 and 2021 packages but as "not reported" for the 2024 package.

The first assessed forest reference emission level (FREL), submitted in 2018, covered reducing emissions from deforestation and reducing emissions from forest degradation at national scale. Using historical data for 2000-2015, the modified and assessed FREL set annual benchmark values for 2016-2020 of 14,627,465, 15,591,284, 16,555,103, 17,518,922 and 18,482,741 t CO2 eq per year. The technical assessment states that it included above-ground biomass, below-ground biomass and deadwood, excluded litter and soil organic carbon, and reported CO2 together with CH_{4} and N_{2}O emissions from deforestation.

A second national FREL, technically assessed in 2022, again covered deforestation and forest degradation. Using historical data for 2000-2019, the modified and assessed FREL set annual benchmark values for 2020-2024 of 14,008,882, 14,612,231, 15,215,572, 15,818,913 and 16,422,255 t CO2 eq per year. The technical assessment states that it again included above-ground biomass, below-ground biomass and deadwood, excluded litter and soil organic carbon, and reported gross CO2 emissions together with CH_{4} and N_{2}O emissions from forest fires.

== Extreme points ==
- Northernmost point – Oostelijke Polders
- Southernmost point – Border with Brazil Coeroeni
- Westernmost point – Border with Guyana, Sipaliwini District
- Easternmost point – Border with French Guiana, Sipaliwini District
- Highest point – Julianatop: 1,230 m
- Lowest point – unnamed location on the coastal plain: -2 m

== See also ==
- Tigri Area, an unresolved territorial dispute involving Guyana and Suriname.
- Borders of Suriname, consisting of land borders with three countries: Guyana, Brazil, and France (via French Guiana)
