= Winston Lackin =

Surinamese politician (1954–2019)

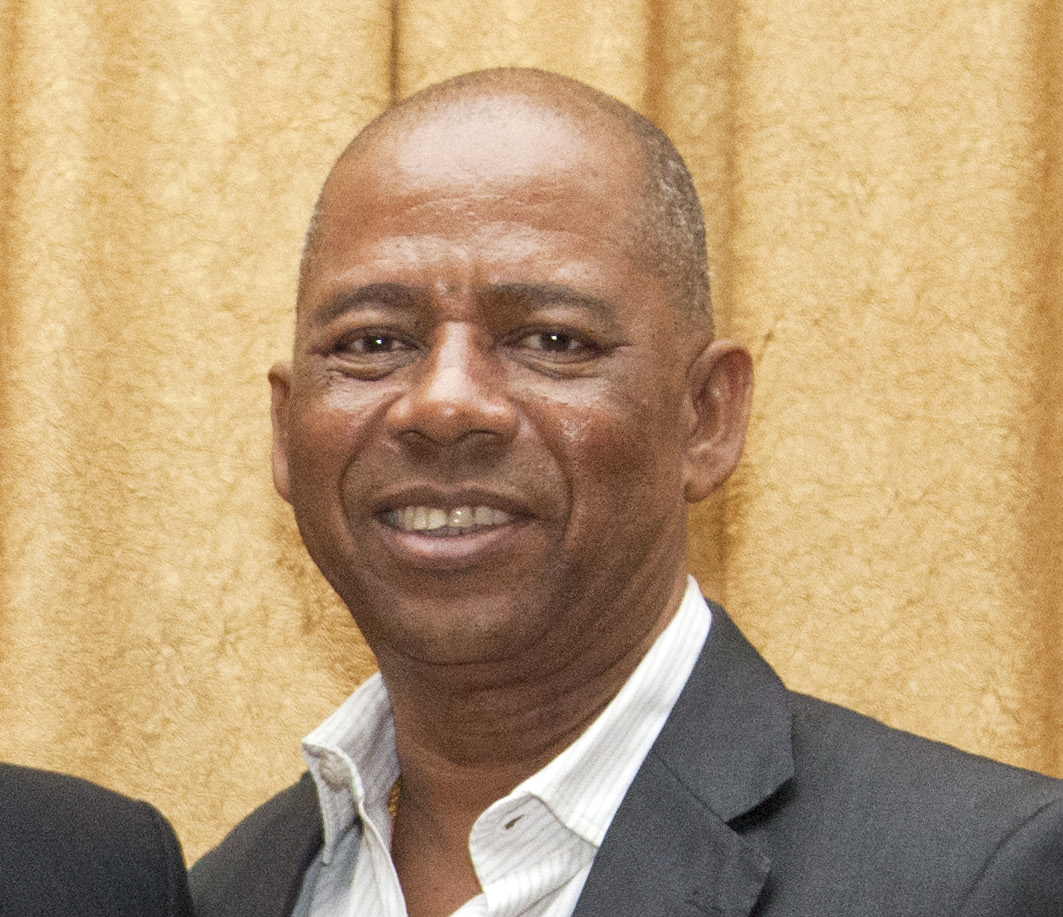
- Winston Lackin in 2013

Minister of Foreign Affairs
- In office 13 August 2010 – 13 August 2015
- President: Dési Bouterse
- Preceded by: Lygia Kraag-Keteldijk
- Succeeded by: Niermala Badrising

Personal details
- Born: Winston Guno Lackin; 23 December 1954 Nickerie District, Suriname
- Died: 11 November 2019 (aged 64) Suriname
- Party: National Democratic Party
- Education: Anton de Kom University of Suriname

Winston Guno Lackin (23 December 1954 – 11 November 2019) was a Surinamese politician. He was Minister of Foreign Affairs of Suriname in the cabinet of President Dési Bouterse between 13 August 2010 and 13 August 2015.

== Career ==
Lackin was born on 23 December 1954 in Nickerie District. He went to high school in the capital city of Paramaribo. Lackin subsequently studied law at the Anton de Kom University of Suriname. Afterwards he studied at the Rio Branco Institute in Brazil between 1984 and 1986 to prepare for a career in diplomacy.

Between 1983 and 1984 Lackin was head of the Europe department at the Ministry of Foreign Affairs. From 1986 to 1991 he was also employed by the Ministry. In 1991 he became first secretary at the Surinamese embassy at Brasília, Brazil. He stayed there until 1994 when he returned to his job at the Ministry of Foreign Affairs.

In 1997 he went abroad once more when he became counselor at the Surinamese embassy in Brussels, Belgium. In 2000 he returned to Suriname, where he was employed at the Ministry of Foreign Affairs until his appointment as Minister of Foreign Affairs in the cabinet of President Dési Bouterse on 13 August 2010. On 13 August 2015 Lackin handed over the post of Minister of Foreign Affairs to Niermala Badrising.

== Policies ==
In the first half of 2012 Suriname held the chairmanship of the Caribbean Community, and Lackin tried to make Suriname a bridge between the Caribbean Community and the Union of South American Nations.

In January 2013 Lackin spoke with his Dutch colleague Frans Timmermans, establishing the first ministerial contact with the Netherlands since 2010. Under Lackin relations between Suriname and the Netherlands improved in late 2014 and early 2015, with the countries exchanging ambassadors once more. Lackin said relations were completely restored.

== Personal life ==
From 1985 to 1987, he was the drummer of the Brazilian music group Obina Shok. Lackin died on 11 November 2019 at his home in Suriname at the age of 64.
