= List of diplomatic missions of Suriname =

This is a list of diplomatic missions of Suriname, excluding honorary consulates.

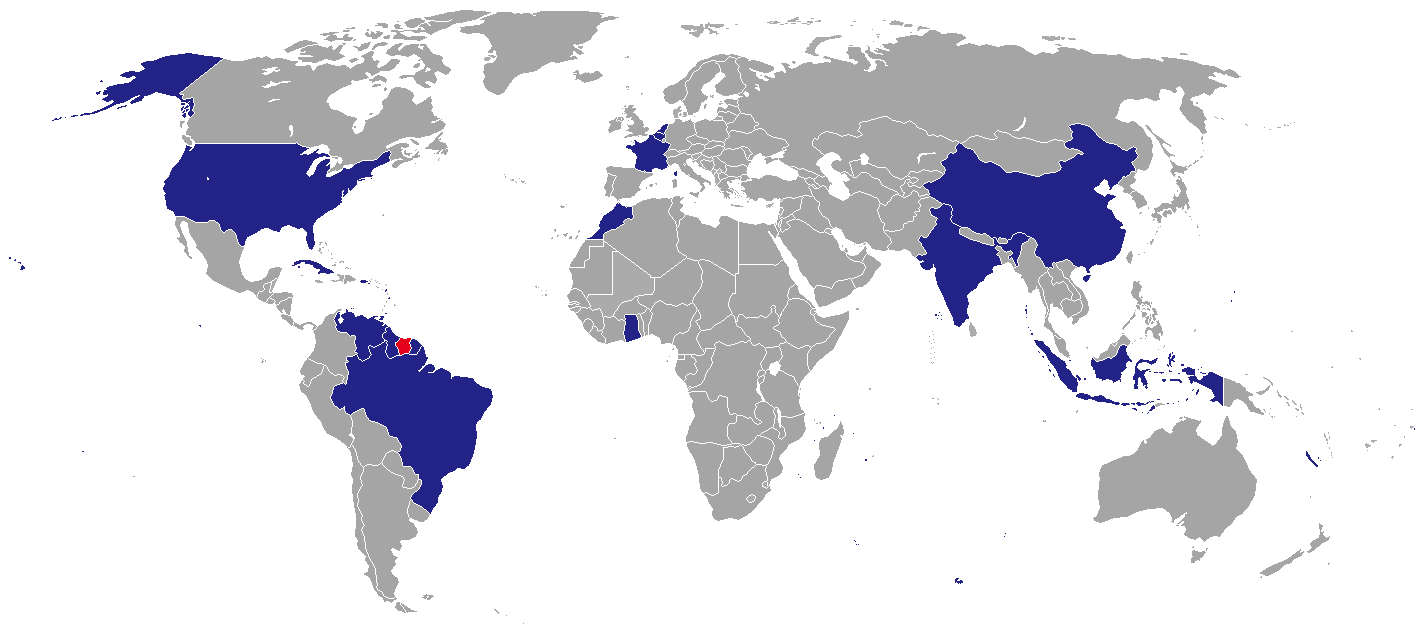
Diplomatic missions of Suriname

== Current missions ==
=== Africa ===
| Host country | Host city | Mission | Concurrent accreditation | Ref. |
|---|---|---|---|---|
| Ghana | Accra | Embassy | Countries: Kenya; South Africa | |
| Morocco | Rabat | Embassy | | |
| Morocco | Dakhla | Consulate-General | | |

=== Americas ===
| Host country | Host city | Mission | Concurrent accreditation | Ref. |
|---|---|---|---|---|
| Brazil | Brasília | Embassy | Countries: Ecuador; Paraguay; Uruguay | |
| Brazil | Belém | Consulate-General | Countries: Ecuador; Paraguay; Uruguay | |
| Cuba | Havana | Embassy | Countries: Bahamas | |
| Guyana | Georgetown | Embassy | Countries: Trinidad and Tobago | |
| United States | Washington, D.C. | Embassy | International Organizations: Organization of American States | |
| United States | Miami | Consulate-General | International Organizations: Organization of American States | |
| Venezuela | Caracas | Embassy | Countries: Bolivia | |

=== Asia ===
| Host country | Host city | Mission | Concurrent accreditation | Ref. |
|---|---|---|---|---|
| China | Beijing | Embassy | Countries: Cambodia; Japan; New Zealand; South Korea | |
| India | New Delhi | Embassy | Countries: Sri Lanka; Vietnam | |
| Indonesia | Jakarta | Embassy | Countries: Australia; Philippines; Thailand | |

=== Europe ===
| Host country | Host city | Mission | Concurrent accreditation | Ref. |
|---|---|---|---|---|
| Belgium | Brussels | Embassy | Countries: Austria; Germany; International Organizations: European Union; Organisation of African, Caribbean and Pacific States | |
| France | Paris | Embassy | | |
| France | Cayenne, French Guiana | Consulate-General | | |
| France | Saint-Laurent-du-Maroni, French Guiana | Consulate-General | | |
| Netherlands | The Hague | Embassy | Countries: Finland; Holy See; Norway | |
| Netherlands | Amsterdam | Consulate-General | Countries: Finland; Holy See; Norway | |
| Netherlands | Willemstad, Curaçao | Consulate-General | Countries: Finland; Holy See; Norway | |

=== Multilateral organizations ===
| Organization | Host city | Host country | Mission | Concurrent accreditation | Ref. |
|---|---|---|---|---|---|
| United Nations | Geneva | Switzerland | Permanent Mission | | |
| United Nations | New York City | United States | Permanent Mission | Countries: Guatemala | |

== Gallery ==
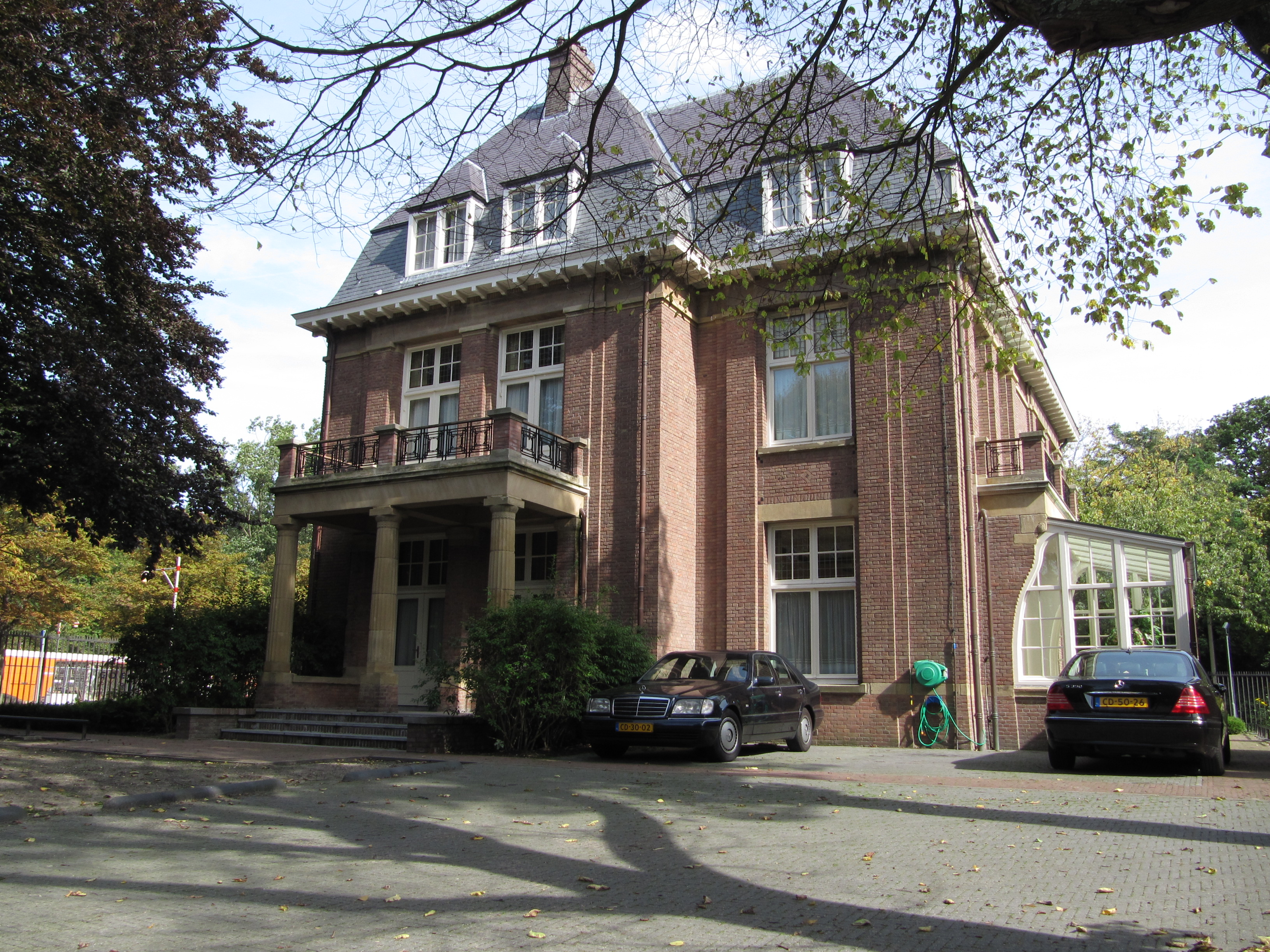
Embassy in The Hague

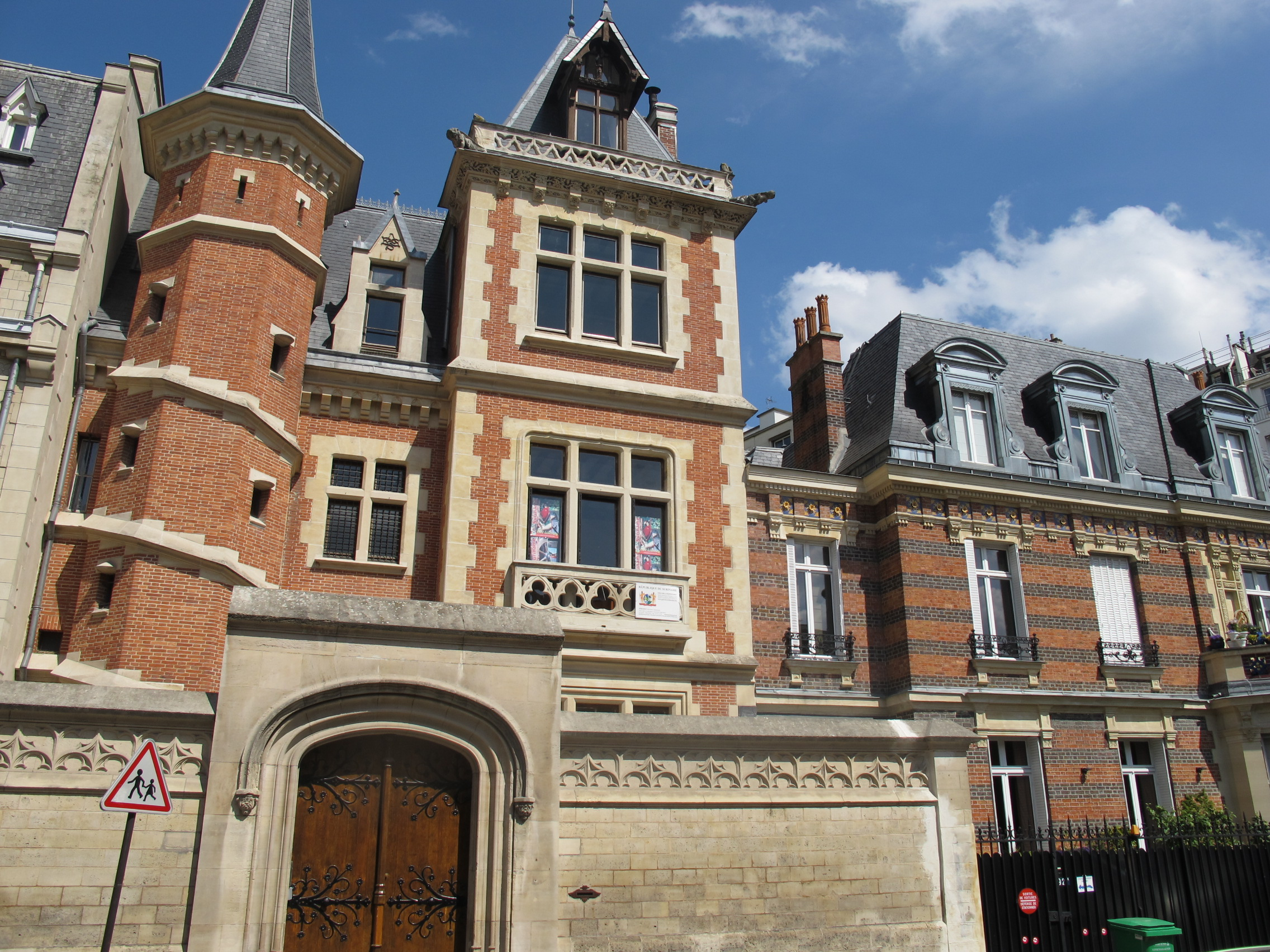
Embassy in Paris

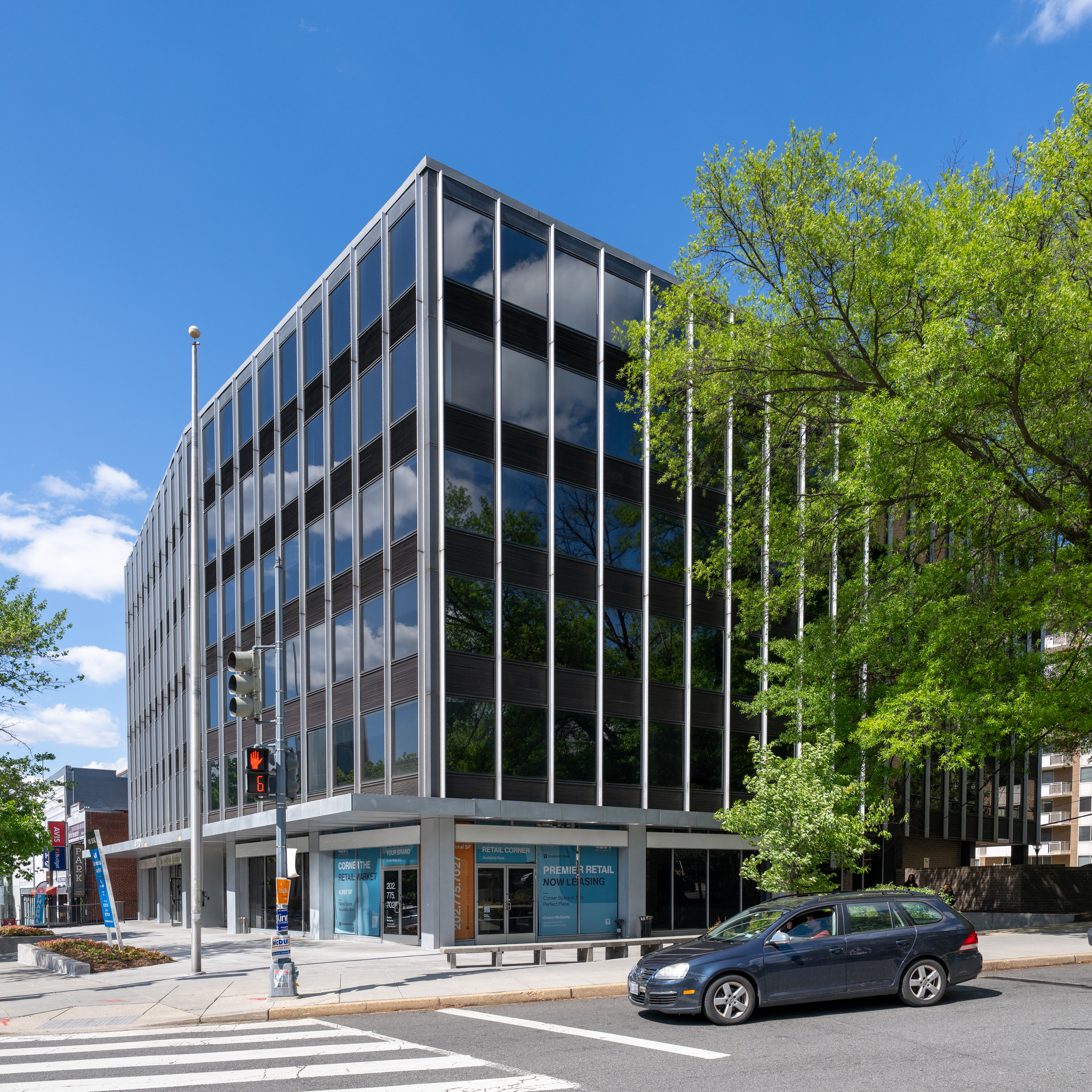
Building hosting the Embassy in Washington, D.C.

== See also ==
- Foreign relations of Suriname
- List of diplomatic missions in Suriname
- Visa policy of Suriname
