= Suriname–Switzerland relations =

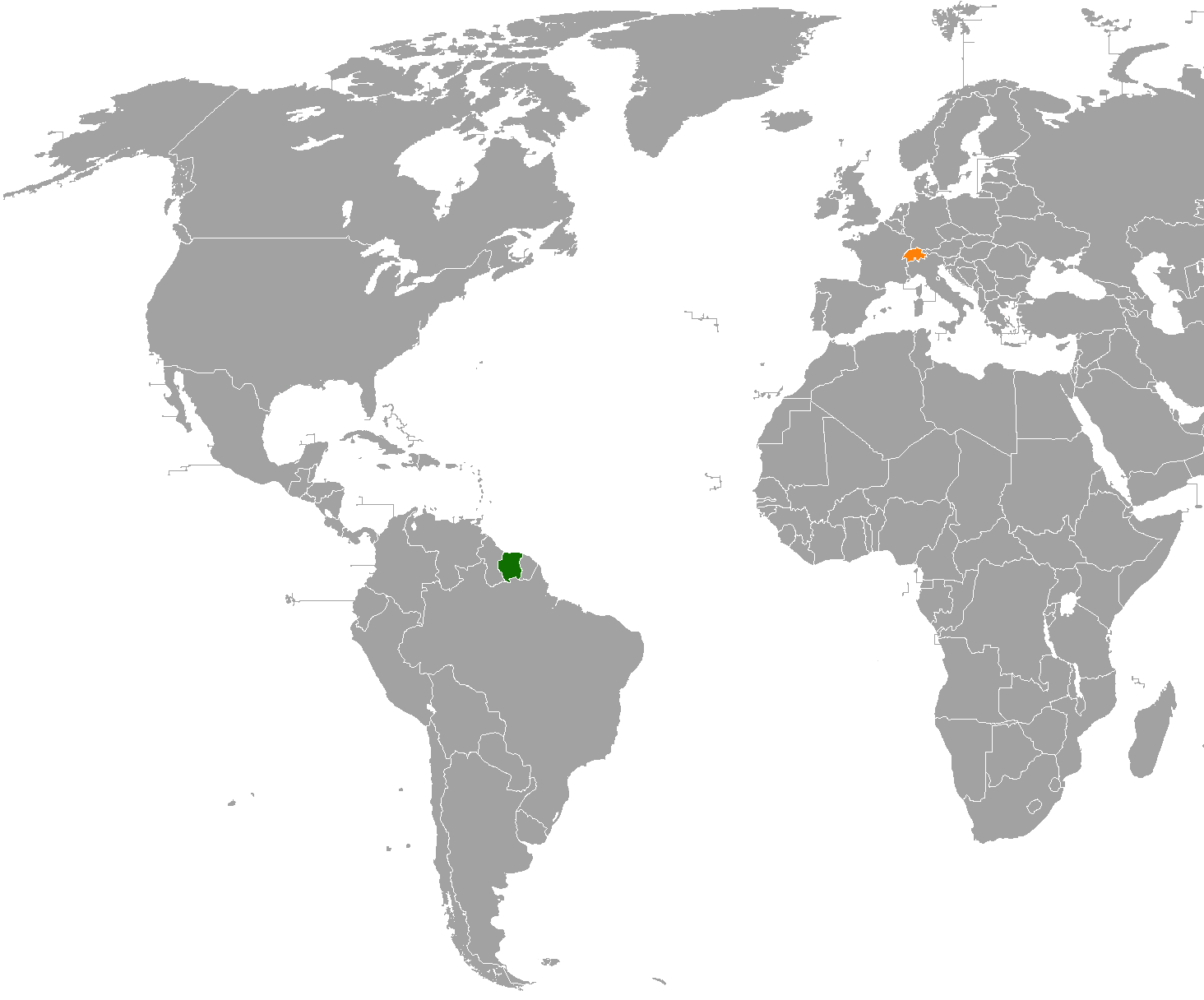
- Suriname: Switzerland

Diplomatic relations between Suriname and Switzerland were established in 1979. Suriname is accredited to Switzerland from its embassy in Brussels, Belgium. Switzerland is accredited to Suriname from its embassy in Caracas, Venezuela.

== Economic relations ==
In the year 2018, Switzerland imported approximately one billion United States Dollars' worth of goods from Suriname, primarily in the form of gemstones and precious metals. Suriname imported roughly 4.8 million dollars' worth of goods from Switzerland, mainly in the form of chemicals and related equipment and machinery.

== Additional reading ==
- Marc Warnery: Seul au milieu de 128 nègres. Un planteur vaudois en Guyane hollandaise au temps de l'esclavage. Lettres à ses parents, 1823–1835. Editions d’en bas, Lausanne 2008.
