= List of diplomatic missions in Suriname =

This is a list of diplomatic missions in Suriname. There are currently 11 embassies in Paramaribo; (not including honorary consulates).

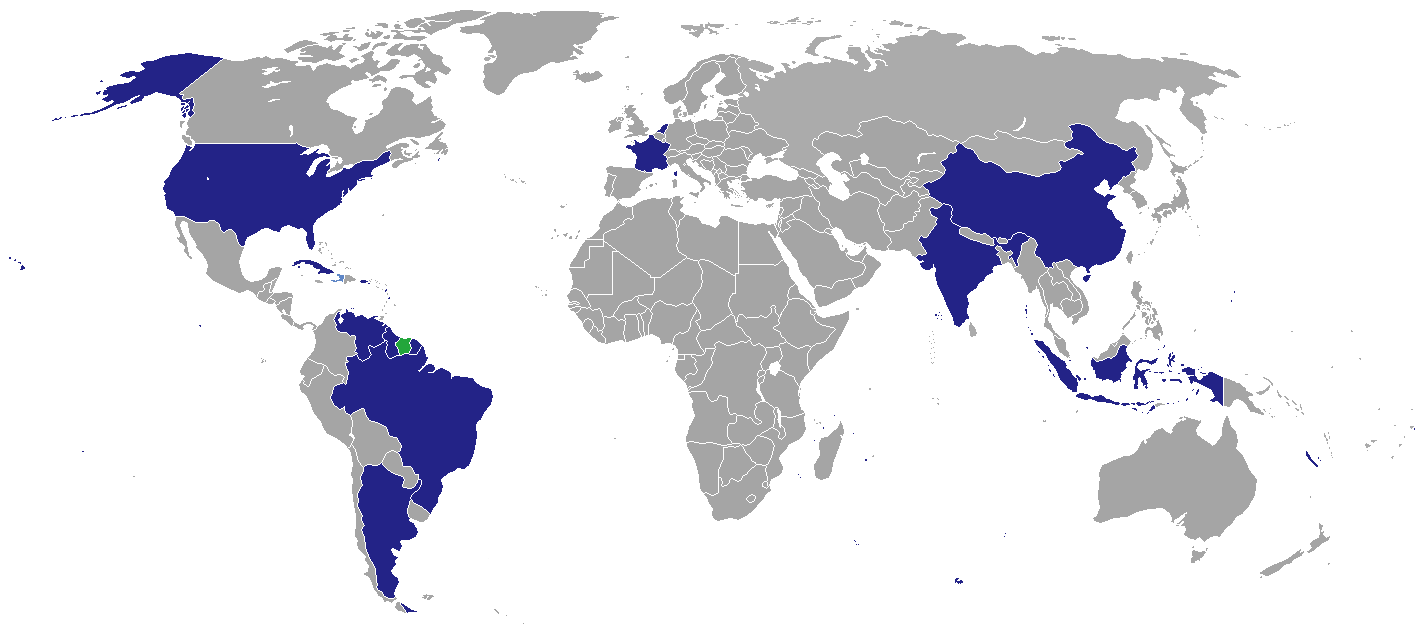
Map of diplomatic missions in Suriname

== Diplomatic missions in Paramaribo ==
Country	Mission type	Year opened	Photo
Argentina	Embassy	2012	-
Brazil	Embassy	1976	-
China	Embassy	1977	
Cuba	Embassy	1981	
France	Embassy	1991	
Guyana	Embassy	1979	
Haiti	Consulate-General	2013	
India	Embassy	1977	
Indonesia	Embassy	1976	
Netherlands	Embassy	1975	
United States	Embassy	1975	
Venezuela	Embassy	1978	

== Consulates-General in Suriname ==
Nickerie

- Guyana

== Non-Resident Embassies ==
Resident in Brasília

- Angola
- Armenia
- Austria
- Azerbaijan
- Bahrain
- Bangladesh
- Botswana
- Bulgaria
- Cape Verde
- Cambodia
- Costa Rica
- Cyprus
- Czechia
- Denmark
- Ecuador
- Equatorial Guinea
- Finland
- Georgia
- Ghana
- Guinea
- Honduras
- Hungary
- Ireland
- Italy
- Ivory Coast
- Kazakhstan
- Kenya
- Kuwait
- Lebanon
- Luxembourg
- Malaysia
- Morocco
- Mozambique
- Namibia
- Nepal
- New Zealand
- North Macedonia
- Norway
- Oman
- Pakistan
- Peru
- Philippines
- Qatar
- Romania
- Russia
- Rwanda
- Saudi Arabia
- Singapore
- Slovakia
- Sri Lanka
- Syria
- Tanzania
- Thailand
- Ukraine
- United Arab Emirates
- Uruguay
- Vietnam
- Zambia

Resident in Caracas

- Algeria
- Barbados
- Belarus
- Bolivia
- Egypt
- Greece
- Grenada
- Holy See
- Honduras
- Iran
- Iraq
- South Korea
- Libya
- Nicaragua
- Paraguay
- Poland
- Portugal
- Saint Vincent and the Grenadines
- Switzerland

Resident in Havana

- Djibouti
- Gambia
- Mongolia
- North Korea
- Senegal
- Solomon Islands
- Sudan
- Togo
- Zimbabwe

Resident in Port of Spain

- Australia
- Canada
- Chile
- Dominican Republic
- El Salvador
- Germany
- Guatemala
- Japan
- Mexico
- Nigeria
- Panama
- Spain
- Turkey

Resident in New York City

- Belize
- Bosnia and Herzegovina
- Brunei
- Croatia
- Estonia
- Eswatini
- Fiji
- Iceland
- Latvia
- Lithuania
- Maldives
- Mauritius
- Samoa
- Seychelles
- Slovenia

Resident elsewhere

- Antigua and Barbuda (St. John's)
- Bahamas (Nassau)
- Belgium (Kingston)
- Colombia (Georgetown)
- Dominica (Roseau)
- Israel (Jerusalem)
- Kyrgyzstan (Washington DC)
- Malta (Valletta)
- Moldova (Washington DC)
- Montenegro (Buenos Aires)
- Saint Kitts and Nevis (Basse-Terre)
- Saint Lucia (Castries)
- San Marino (Rome)
- Serbia (Washington, D.C.)
- South Africa (Kingston)
- Sweden (Stockholm)
- Tajikistan (Washington DC)
- Trinidad and Tobago (Georgetown)
- Turkmenistan (Washington DC)
- United Kingdom (Georgetown)

== Closed missions ==
Host city	Sending country	Mission	Year closed	Ref.
Paramaribo	South Korea	Embassy	1993	

== See also ==
- Foreign relations of Suriname
- List of diplomatic missions of Suriname
