= Climate change in Suriname =

Emissions, impacts and responses of Suriname related to climate change

Köppen climate classification map for Suriname for 1991–2020

2071–2099 map under the most intense climate change scenario. Mid-range scenarios are currently considered more likely

Climate change in Suriname is leading to warmer temperatures and more extreme weather events in Suriname. As a relatively poor country, its contributions to global climate change have been limited. Because of the large forest cover, the country has been running a carbon negative economy since 2014.

Suriname was the second country to update its Nationally Determined Contributions in 2020.

== Greenhouse gas emissions ==
Suriname has claimed a net-negative carbon economy since at least 2014. This is in large part because dense forests cover over 93% of the country. Most of the rainforest is still in pristine condition, however it is being threatened by gold mining and logging companies.

Agriculture contributes 40% of the country's emissions.

=== Petroleum industry ===
Petroleum exports are an important part of the economy of Suriname, much of which is controlled by the state owned Staatsolie Maatschappij Suriname. As of January 2020, an American corporation, Apache Corporation, was drilling wells in Maka Central.

== Impacts on the natural environment ==
=== Temperature and weather changes ===
According to the World Bank, temperatures have already increased across the country, with a significant increase in hot weather. Though precipitation has not shown any significant trend changes, projections suggest significant changes in different parts of the country.

=== Sea level rise ===
90% of Suriname's human activity is on the Northern coast, which is particularly vulnerable to sea level rise and salt water intrusion.

== Impacts on people ==
=== Economic impacts ===
==== Agriculture ====
Though agriculture is a decreasing part of the total economy of the country, accounting for 9% of GDP in 2012, it is the third largest part of the Surinamese economy employing 15% of the population in 2009. Changing weather and flood events are expect to have significant negative effects on agriculture in the country. 49% of the economic losses of May 2006 floods in Suriname were agricultural.

=== Health impacts ===
The greatest risk Suriname faces is the flooding of the rivers. The population is concentrated around major rivers like the Suriname, Commewijne, and Marowijne River in an area a few meters above sea level. In 2006 and 2015, there were majors floods even resulting in deaths.

== Mitigation and adaptation ==
=== Policies and legislation ===
The Surinamese government was proactive about updating its Nationally Determined Contributions statement in 2020, second only behind the Climate change in the Marshall Islands. The major commitments included maintenance of forests as a carbon sink, 35% renewable energy by 2030, and sustainable farming and transportation investments.
