= Yldiz Pollack-Beighle =

Surinamese politician

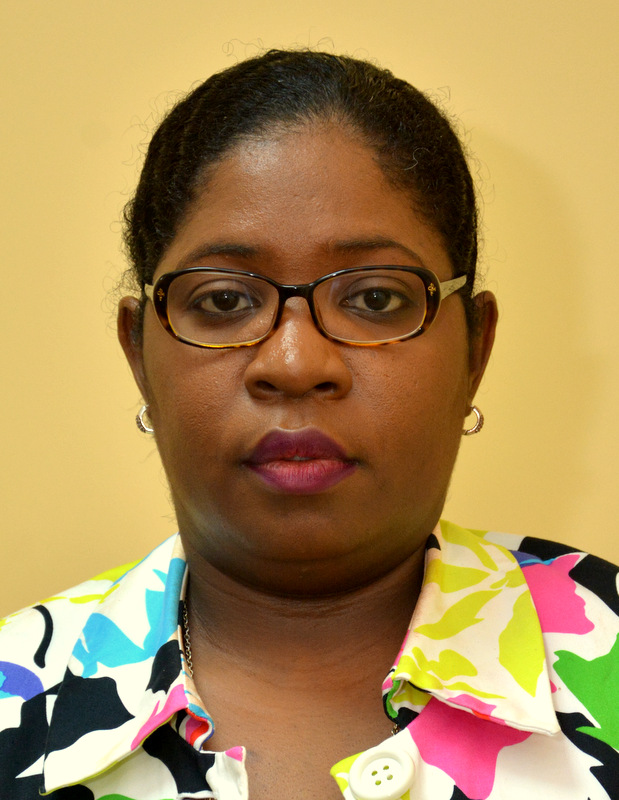
- Dew Sharman (2017)

Minister of Foreign Affairs
- In office 1 February 2017 – 16 July 2020
- Preceded by: Niermala Badrising
- Succeeded by: Albert Ramdin

Personal details
- Born: Yldiz Deborah Pollack-Beighle; 21 April 1983 (age 43) Paramaribo, Suriname
- Party: NDP
- Spouse: Jozef Pollack
- Children: 1

Yldiz Deborah Pollack-Beighle (born 21 April 1983) is a Surinamese politician who has served as Minister of Foreign Affairs from February 2017 to 16 July 2020.

== Early life and education ==
Pollack-Beighle was born in Paramaribo on 21 April 1983. She has a master's degree in law from the Anton de Kom University of Suriname (2009) and a master's degree in public administration and governance from the FHR Lim a Po Institute for Social Studies (2012).

== Career ==
Pollack-Beighle worked as a youth ambassador for Caribbean Community from 2005 and in 2008 was seconded by Suriname to the Secretariat in Guyana where she was a policy officer before becoming deputy program manager for youth development in 2013.

On 1 February 2017, Pollack-Beighle was appointed Minister of Foreign Affairs by President Dési Bouterse. She served until 16 July 2020.

== Personal life ==
Pollack-Beighle is married to Jozef Pollack and has a daughter.
