= Natasha Halfhuid =

Surinamese diplomat

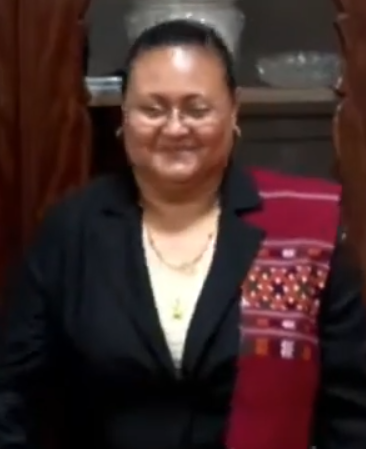
Natasha Halfhuid

Natasha Halfhuid is a Surinamese diplomat. She became Suriname's first ambassador to Ghana in 2019.

== Biography ==
Until 2010 Natasha Halfhuid worked for the Ministry of Planning and Development Cooperation as Office Coordinator for the United Nations. In the 2010s she worked at the Embassy of Suriname] Brasilia.

In mid-2018, efforts were made to establish a Surinamese embassy in Ghana. On July 24, she was sworn in by President Bouterse as Suriname's first ambassador there. On September 17, 2019, she presented her credentials in the capital Accra to the Ghanaian president Nana Akufo-Addo.
