= History of slavery in the Netherlands =

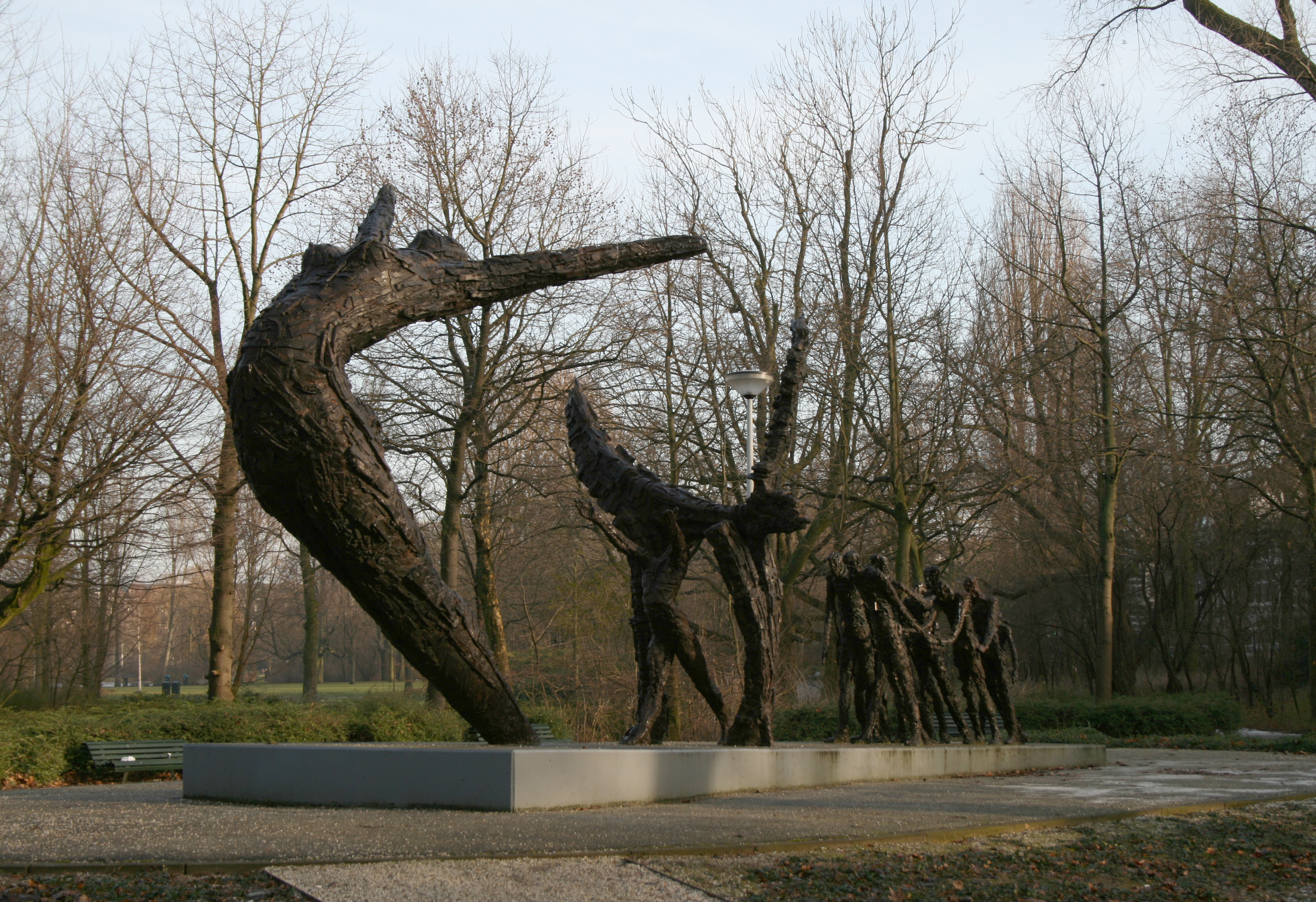
The National Slavery Monument in Amsterdam

Newsreel from 1963. Celebration of the emancipation day in Paramaribo, to celebrate 100 years since the abolishment of slavery (English subtitles available).

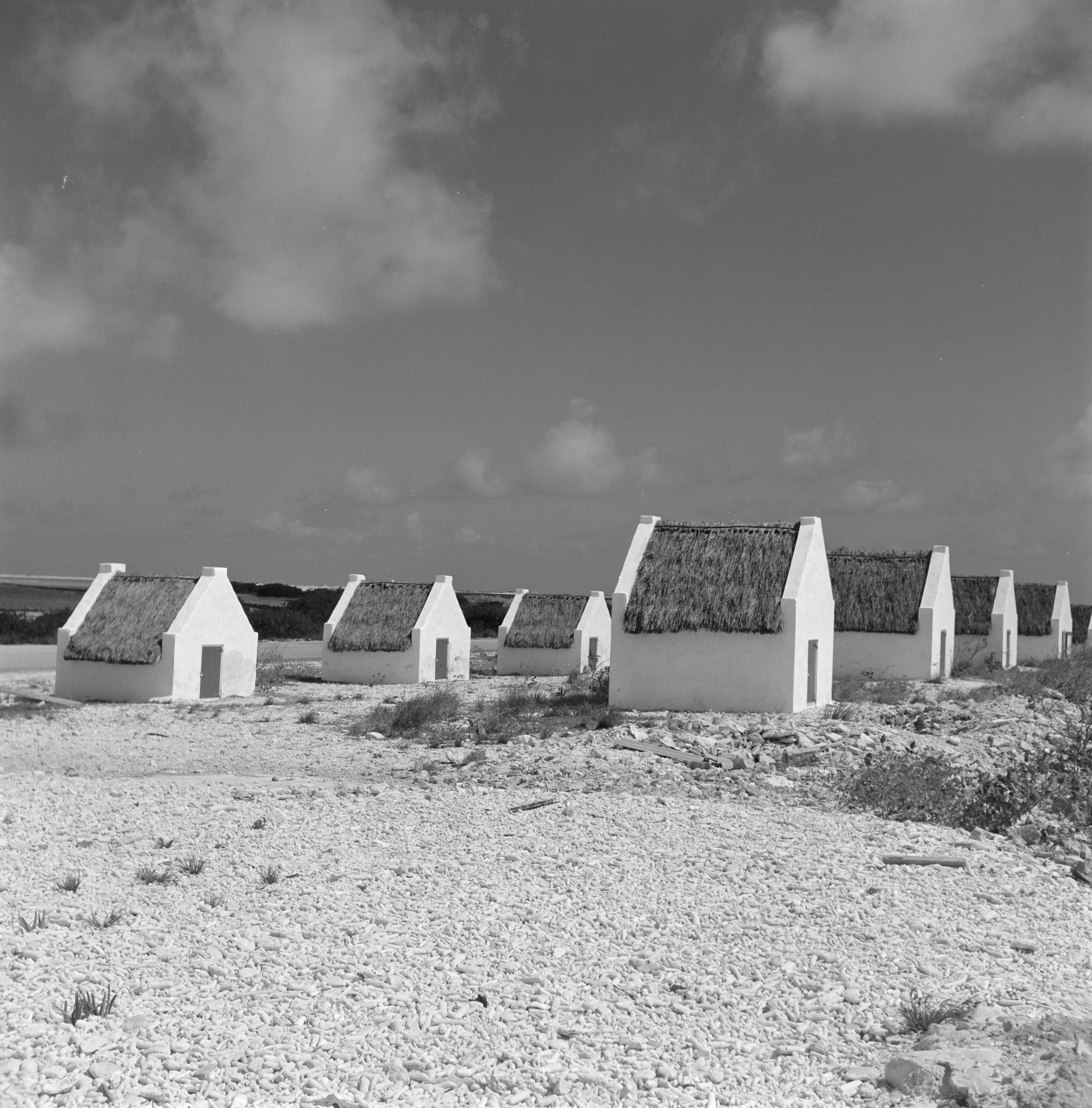
Slave houses on Bonaire

The history of slavery in the Netherlands dates back to the period of classical antiquity. During the Roman era, slavery in large parts of the later Netherlands was reflected by the institution of slavery in the Roman Empire.

During the middle ages, the Netherlands was a part of the Carolingian Empire and the Holy Roman Empire, where chattel slavery was gradually replaced by serfdom. Slavery was eventually phased out in the Netherlands itself during the middle ages. However, in parallel with several other European countries, the Netherlands were later to introduce slave labor in their colonies, while slavery was no longer used in the mother country itself.

During the early modern period, Dutch slave traders bought and sold over 1.6 million slaves. The Netherlands abolished Dutch involvement in the Atlantic slave trade in 1814 under diplomatic pressure from the United Kingdom, but slavery would continue to exist in the Dutch colonial empire until 1863.

== Slavery in the Low Countries ==
=== Antiquity ===
Before the Netherlands became a country, various ethnic groups lived in the area. Examples of these are the Celts and the Germanic peoples. Both ethnic groups had societies that consisted of nobles, freemen and slaves. During the Roman era, slaves were also fairly common.

=== The Middle ages ===
During the early middle ages, the Frisians traded in slaves, which were mainly intended for slave markets in Spain (al-Andalus) and Cairo. The Frisians were one of the main slave traders in Europe in the 7th and 8th centuries, when they conducted trade between Scandinavia and the British Isles, where they purchased war captives as slaves, and exported them along the rivers to Paris and the German cities.

In the 9th century, the Low countries became a part of the Carolingian Empire and then the Holy Roman Empire. Slavery in the Carolingian Empire was a legal institution, though feudalism gradually phased out slavery in favor of serfdom. Slavery as an institution was mainly grounded in common law at first. When feudal lords granted town privileges to cities these often encompassed the principle of ‘’Stadslucht maakt vrij’’ (meaning "City air makes [one] free") i.e. slavery and serfdom were outlawed within the borders of the city and escaped slaves could enjoy asylum there. In the Late Middle Ages, in 1435 the Pope Eugene IV banned enslaving Christians by a decree.

Though not officially "abolished" everywhere, slavery as an institution had for all practical purposes fallen in disuse in the Habsburg Netherlands for these reasons. But the reception of Roman law at the end of the 15th century and its integration into what became known as Roman-Dutch law provided a new legal framework that would make the introduction and regulation of chattel slavery outside Dutch territory easier in later years.

=== Dutch Republic ===
The legal system regarding slavery in the European area of The Dutch Republic, was inconsistent, notably in the Low Countries. According to Leuven professor Petrus Gudelinus, in 16th-century Mechelen, an enslaved person who had escaped was freed because it was argued that slavery did not exist in the Low Countries. However, Spanish and Portuguese merchants often brought people who were enslaved into cities such as Antwerp and Amsterdam as their servants. During the 18th century, plantation owners also brought slaves with them however they were few in number.

Records, though incomplete, show that between 1729 and 1775, roughly 500 people of African descent traveled from Suriname to the Netherlands, with the majority returning after a short stay. Although people who were enslaved could legally sue for their freedom, they rarely did so, and the few who attempted court challenges seldom succeeded. In 1736, Claes, an enslaved man, escaped from Curaçao to the Netherlands as a stowaway on a ship, however. the Supreme Court of Holland and Zeeland ruled that he remained the property of Paulina Meyer, establishing that he was a "thief of himself" and therefore stolen property (res furtiva) .

In 1776, the States General of the Netherlands issued a resolution regarding the legal status of enslaved people on Dutch soil. While the resolution emphasized that all individuals in The Netherlands were recognized as free, it carved out a property exception for visiting colonial slaveholders. Under this rule, enslaved individuals brought to the Netherlands remained property if their stay lasted under six months or up to twelve months with court approval. If the slave owner failed to return them to the colonies within this timeframe, the enslaved person was legally emancipated. However, historical evidence remains unclear as to how consistently this was enforced.

== Atlantic slave trade ==
The share of the Dutch Republic in the Atlantic slave trade was on average around five percent, at least 500,000 people. The slave trade by the Dutch West India Company (WIC) has in their starting years contributed to the status of the Netherlands as an economic world power.

Already in 1528, an asiento or contract was made between the rulers of Spain and assumingly the Southern Netherlandish merchants Willem Sailler and Hendrink Eynger, to transfer during the next four years 4,000 slaves from Africa to the Caribbean. However, the slave trade was originally seen as immoral in the Netherlands. It went against Christian norms and values, therefore people initially refrained from engaging in the slave trade.

During the fight against the Spanish and the Portuguese, privateering was legal. This has been the main goal and source of income for the Dutch West India Company since its establishment in 1621. Between 1623 and 1636, 547 Spanish and Portuguese ships were hijacked. After this, the Groot Desseyn was developed, the big plan. By taking over the slave trade the Portuguese sugar cane trade from Brazil could be undermined. With the capture of a Spanish treasure fleet during the Battle in the Bay of Matanzas in 1628, sufficient money was available to carry out the Groot Desseyn. Between 1630 and 1634, Recife and a large part of the Brazilian coast was conquered, this became Dutch Brazil. In 1637, Fort St. George in Elmina on the African Gold Coast (in the Gulf of Benin) was captured. In 1640 the Dutch fought the Portuguese and captured Luanda located in what is now Angola. In 1642 the Dutch went on to conquer the entire Portuguese Gold Coast located in present-day Ghana. The Dutch Cape Colony was established in 1652. Around 1700, the Dutch West India Company owned a dozen trading fortresses on the West African coast.

The Dutch slave trade grew to sizable proportions. To alleviate ethical concerns about slavery raised by Christians, it was argued that in Genesis 9 it states that descendants of Ham are cursed into slavery, since Ham's descendants are interpreted by some as having populated Africa. To maintain the sugar production, many Portuguese plantation owners in the conquered part of Brazil were able to keep their plantation. Private slaves were required for this. This signalled a change in the stands about the slave trade; non-Christians could be sold as slaves.

From 1640, the slave trade with Brazil began to decline, and the trade was shifted to the Spanish colonies in America. Initially, Dutch traders transported slaves to Buenos Aires and Río de la Plata in present-day Argentina, later the Caribbean also became the target of the slave trade.

When Brazil was recaptured in 1654, there were already some 25,000 slaves brought over. After this reconquest, the sugar cane cultivation was transferred to the Caribbean and in 1634 to Curaçao, which then became the Dutch collection point for slaves. After the English invasion of Jamaica in 1655, the island became an important transfer market for slaves to the Spanish colonies. New slave buyers were also found among English and French colonists who grew tobacco on the islands they conquered in the Caribbean and Virginia, though most slaves went to Suriname, which from 1668 was permanently owned by the Netherlands until its independence in 1975.

== Slavery on Curaçao ==
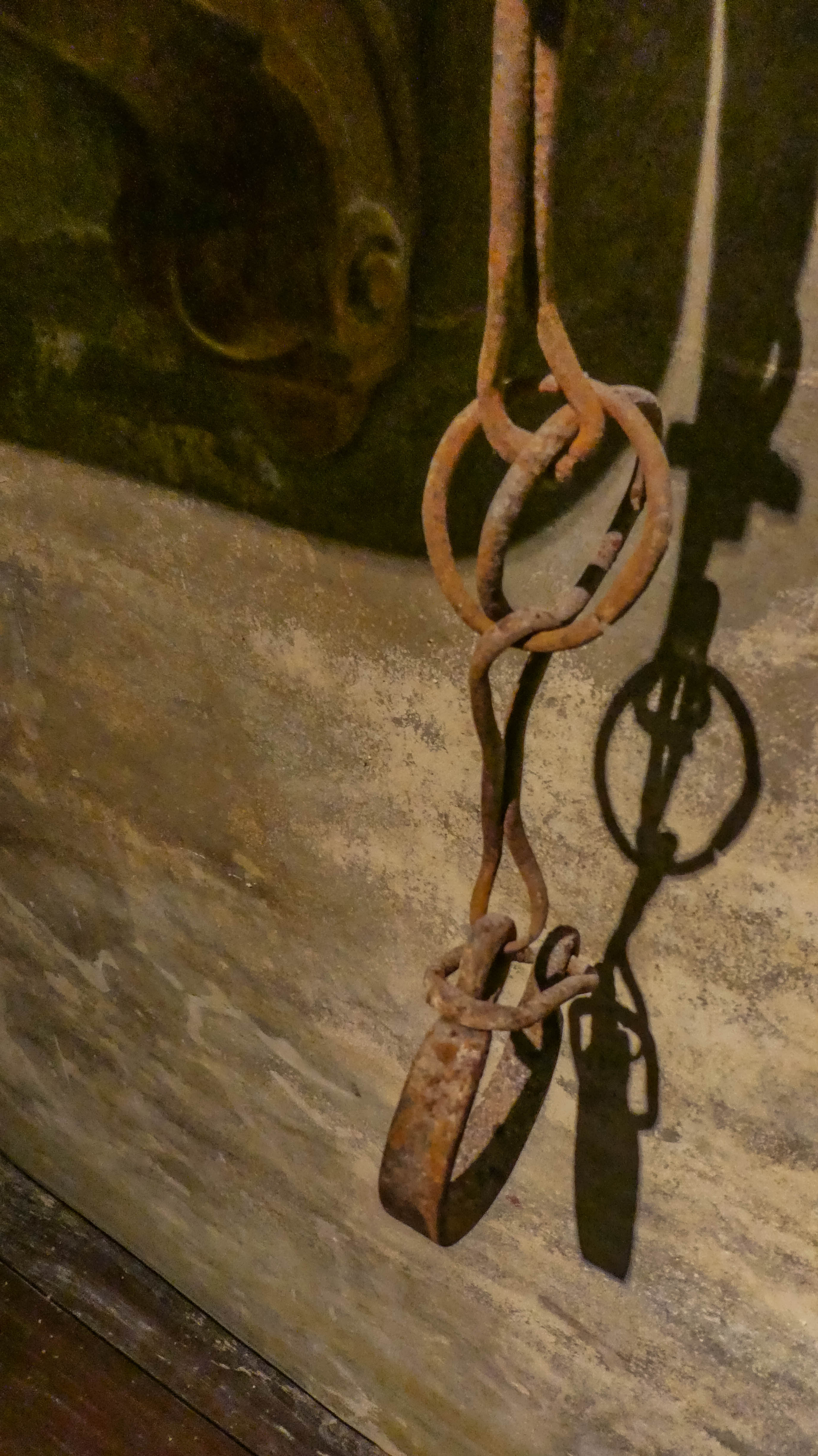
Shackles in the Slavery Museum, Willemstad

In 1662, Spain made an asiento with Domingo Grillo and Ambrosio Lomelino to trade slaves from Africa. Grillo and Lomelino hired the WIC to transport slaves from the African coast to South America. In the contract with WIC, it was stipulated that the Dutch would deliver 24,000 slaves in 7 years, approximately 3,500 slaves per year, in which, Curaçao would function as transfer port. In reality, these amounts were not feasible, with an average of only 700 slaves delivered annually.

On Curaçao, the slaves were subjected to a quality control. Slaves were assessed according to a so-called pieza de Indias, an evaluation of a slave's labour capacity. Then the slaves were sold to Spanish traders and transported to the Spanish colonies. Due to the asiento trade, the Dutch Republic had between 1660 and 1690 roughly 30% of the total slave trade. In the period of 1658 to 1674, an estimated 45,700 slaves were transported to the Americas, however, this was relatively little compared to the total number of slaves transported.

The Coymans asiento became an important factor in the Dutch slave trade. Balthasar Coymans (1652–1686) led a branch of the Dutch trade house Coymans in Cádiz. He started a smear campaign against Venetian Nicolas Porcio who was at the time owner of the asiento. Coymans smear campaign was successful, and in 1685, he obtained the monopoly to trade slaves to the Spanish colonies. He also enlisted the WIC to ship the slaves from Africa. This meant that the Spanish slave trade was entirely operated by the Dutch. Coymans was required to deliver 3,000 piezas annually, however, in the first 3 years, only 4,896 piezas instead of 9,000 were delivered. Coymans died in 1686 and the Spanish lost faith in his successor and in granted the asiento back to Nicolas Porcio in 1688.

In 1689, the WIC declared Curaçao an open market. Merchants from all nationalities were now welcome, however now that trade could only take place on the free market, there was no trade possible with the Spanish colonies. In 1689 and 1691, the WIC did have a few contracts with Porcio; however, the numbers were less than before. In 1697, there was a contract with Real Compañía de Cacheu, the successor of Porcio, for the delivery of 2,500 to 3,000 slaves per year, but Curaçao did no longer serve as a transfer port. In 1699 this contract was extended for another 2 years.

In the 18th century, the slave trade grew enormously. There were years in which more than 100,000 slaves were transported by Dutch slavers. However, the French and the British had taken over the position of the Dutch Republic. The Dutch Republic also found the slave trade to be very not profitable. This was partly due to the high mortality rate among the slaves when crossing the ocean; 30% of the slaves died on board the ships.

=== End of Curaçao's central position as slave market ===
It was not until 1708 that a supply contract was again offered to the WIC. During the War of the Spanish Succession, when the Netherlands again went to war with Spain and France, the French allies obtained the asiento from Spain. They approached the WIC, but the assignment did not go through because the WIC was afraid that Curaçao would be overrun by the French. When the asiento was granted to Britain in 1713, it meant the decline for trade via Curaçao, as the British had their own marketplaces. Initially, the WIC had the monopoly on the slave trade. However, in 1730, the WIC gave up the monopoly on the transport of slaves from Africa to South America, and in 1738 also the monopoly on the slave trade. However, other slave traders had to pay recognition fees to the WIC. The Zeelanders in particular then took over the slave trade, in which the Middelburgsche Commercie Compagnie played an important role.

In 1713, immediately after the War of the Spanish Succession, Curaçao's central position as a regional slave market came to an abrupt end. Slave ships continued to arrive during the following years, but sales stagnated. In 1716, the number of unsold trade slaves (slaves supplemented under the WIC contract) rose to over 800. At the end of that year, a revolt broke out among trade slaves on the WIC plantation Santa Maria. This was quickly suppressed and the insurgents were captured and executed.

After the Seven Years' War of 1763, the slave trade with the Spaniards on Curaçao largely dried up. The slave trade continued despite the low profit margins, partly because many traders also had interests in plantations in Suriname. They needed the slaves for this, and the trade was therefore viable if a profit was made from the plantation.

=== Slave revolt in Curaçao ===
On 17 August 1795, several dozen slaves led by Tula refused to work on the Knip plantation. Slaves from neighboring plantations joined the uprising. A first armed encounter with colonial troops, including units of the free maroons and the free slaves, was won by the insurgents. In negotiations, the slaves demanded their freedom. The ensuing confrontations were settled to the detriment of the slaves. After a final battle on 31 August, the uprising was crushed. The two leaders Tula and Carpata, as well as 29 other insurgents, were executed by the local authorities. It is not impossible that the uprising in Curaçao was inspired by the uprising in Saint-Domingue (Haiti) or the uprising that took place shortly before in Coro, Venezuela. After the uprising, protective slave legislation was enacted in Curaçao, which regulated, among other things, the provision of food rations and clothing, as well as working and rest times.

== Slavery in Suriname ==
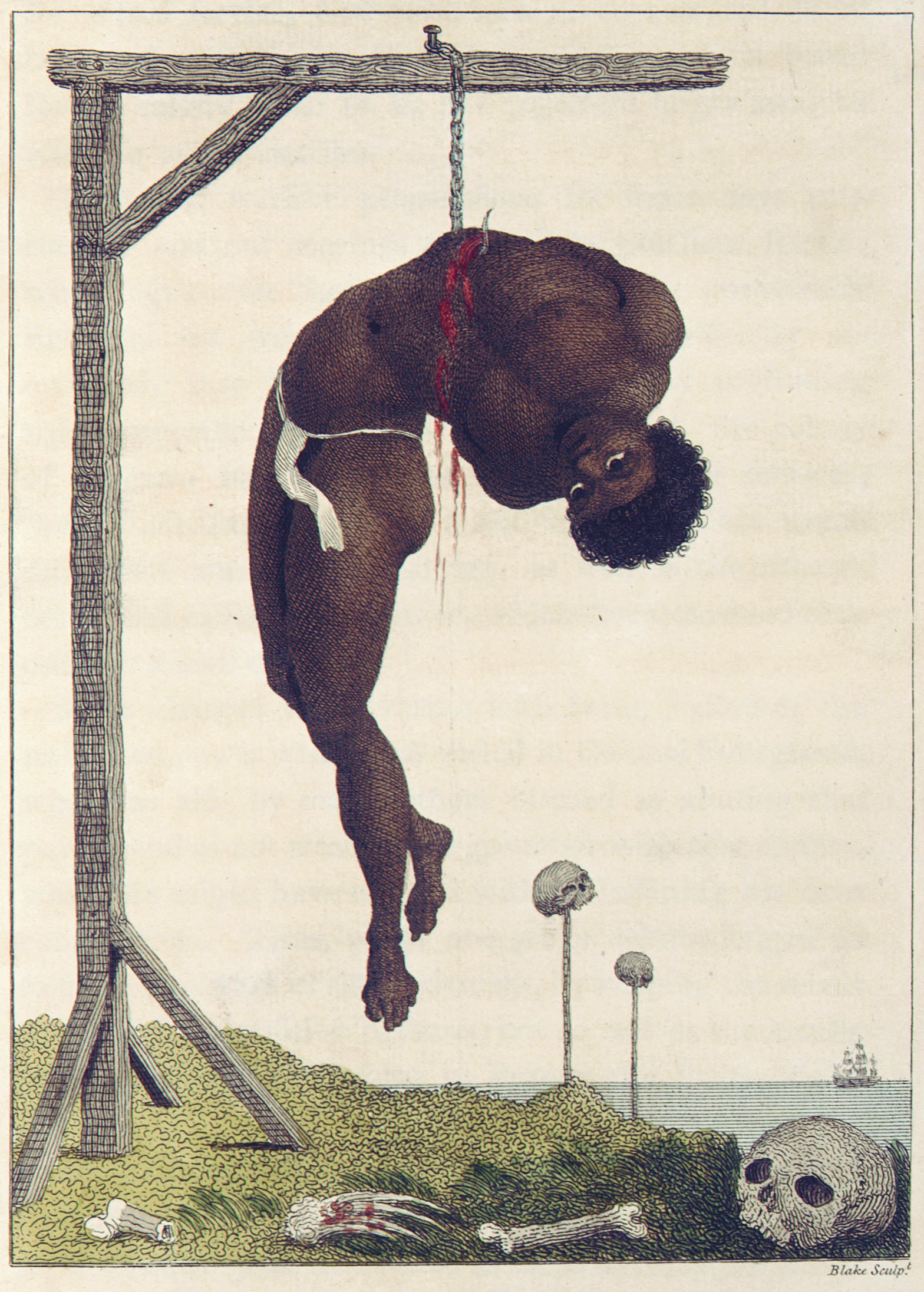
Hanged by the rib was a punishment for a rebellious slave in Suriname. Illustration by William Blake at Stedmans Reize naar Surinamen.

John Gabriël Stedman, a Scotsman in Dutch service, described the Dutch slaveholders in Suriname as cruel, in the book Narrative of a five years' expedition against the revolted Negroes of Surinam in 1797. Descriptions of mistreatment by Dutch slaveholders and the images by William Blake were an important weapon for the mainly British advocates of the abolition of slavery.

The Society of Suriname collected a percentage of the income obtained from the domestic slave market. To avoid this, it was not uncommon to secretly bring slaves ashore.

=== Marrons in Suriname ===
From the arrival of the first slaves from Africa in Suriname, some of them fled inland. These Marrons (Maroons) got to know the jungle and the swamps, and founded mini-states there. From there they raided plantations, looted them and freed slaves; the Dutch could not do much about this. Finally, from 1760, the colonial administration concluded peace treaties with groups of Marrons. Notable captains of the Marrons were Adyáko Benti Basiton (known as Boston Bendt), Adoe, Alabi, Boni, and Broos.

== Slavery in Dutch Guiana ==
In the 17th century, Zeelanders had founded a colony on the banks of the River Berbice in present-day Guyana with plantations that were worked by African slaves. In 1763, the slaves of the Berbice colony led by Cuffy (Kofi, Coffy) revolted, which was eventually brutally suppressed with the help of six naval ships carrying 600 soldiers. This slave revolt was the first major revolt on the American continent.

== Slavery under the VOC ==
Within the context of Dutch history, the WIC is usually thought of when it comes to slavery. However, in Dutch East India Company (VOC) areas slaves were traded earlier than in WIC areas, and until the end of the eighteenth century more slaves were traded and held in VOC areas than in WIC areas. Around 1750 there were an estimated 75,500 slaves in settlements under VOC rule, compared to 64,000 slaves in areas under WIC rule.

=== Slavery in the Cape Colony ===
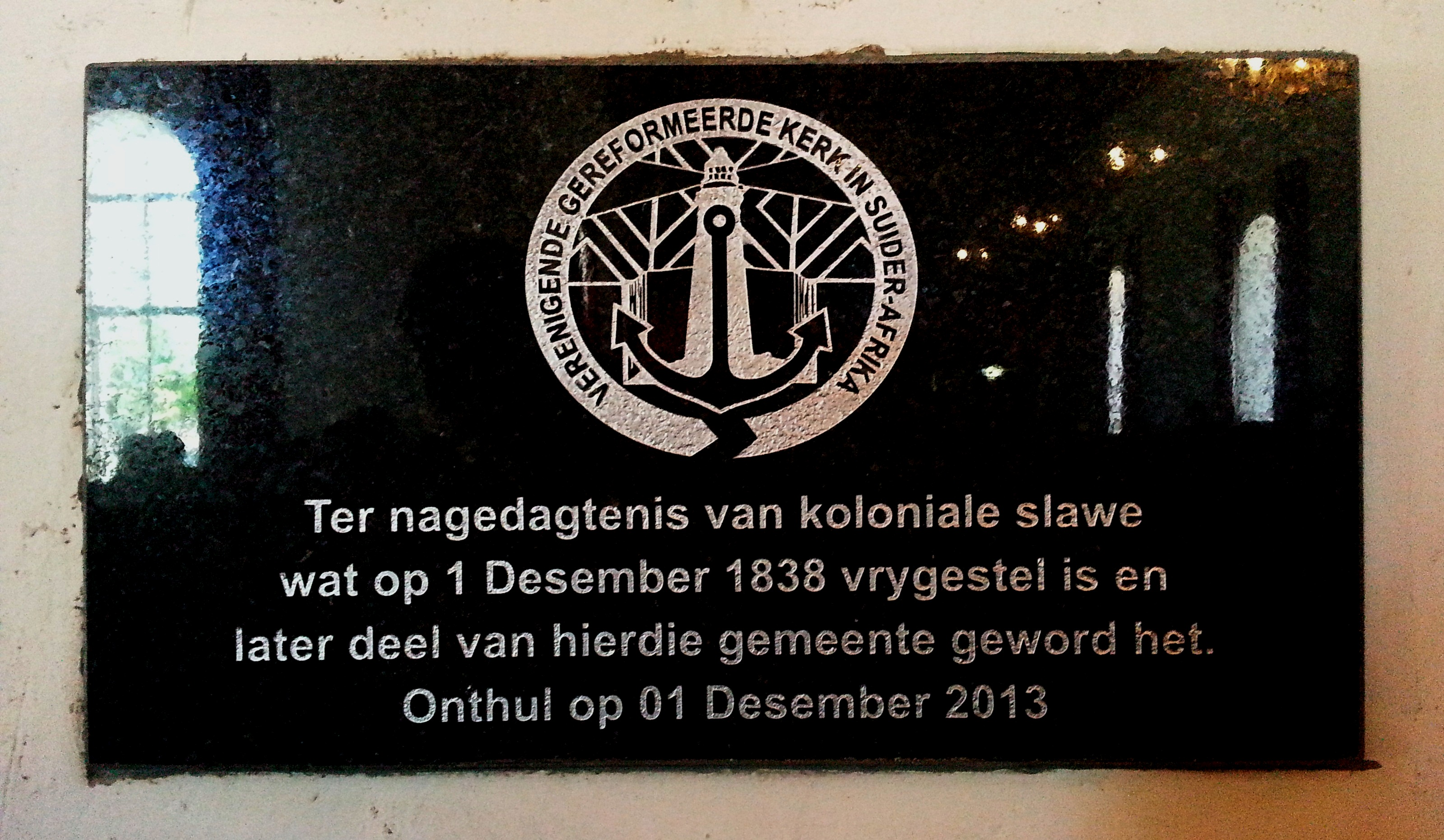
Memorial to the Emancipation of Slaves in the Cape Colony on 1 December 1838.

Between 1652 and 1807, more than 60,000 slaves were transported to the Cape Colony. Half of these slaves came from present-day Madagascar and a third from Asia, mainly from present-day India and Indonesia. Many colored people in South Africa are descended from the slave population, but white families also often have freed slaves among their ancestors.

=== Slavery in the Dutch East Indies ===
During the 17th and 18th centuries, the VOC was the hub of an extensive trade in slaves in Southeast Asia. Over a period of two centuries, the VOC obtained, traded and used 600,000 to 1 million slaves, mainly from present-day India, later also from Celebes and Bali in the Dutch East Indies (present-day Indonesia). Slaves were mainly used for infrastructure, building fortifications and in households. In Batavia, for example, slaves were deployed at the shipyard on the island of Onrust.

According to the traditional image, slaves in the East were mainly a status symbol. In fact this was not the case: In the East, too, slaves had mainly economic value and were used as labor force.

== End of the slave trade ==
The economic recession of 1773 caused a decline in the entire Dutch merchant shipping industry, including the slave trade. When the Dutch Republic delivered weapons and ammunition to the rebels in the American Revolutionary War via the colony of Sint Eustatius, this aroused anger from Britain. When the British arrested the newly appointed American ambassador Henry Laurens in 1780 on his way to the Dutch Republic, they seized a secret treaty between the city of Amsterdam and the rebels in his luggage. In addition, Britain feared that the Dutch Republic would join the First League of Armed Neutrality, which would further protect trade with the Americans. The subsequent Fourth Anglo-Dutch War resulted in a defeat for the Dutch Republic and had major consequences for the Dutch merchant navy and thus the slave trade. The British captured many Dutch ships, causing Dutch involvement in the slave trade to fall sharply. In 1784, after the war, the slave trade was resumed. This was short-lived, however, as the French invaded the Netherlands in 1795. The British again went to war with the Batavian Republic, which was now an ally of the French. In 1802, the Treaty of Amiens made the resumption of trade possible, but when the British again declared war on the French in 1803, the Dutch slave trade came to an end. As in the period from 1799 to 1802, Dutch colonies came under British control; these were also supplied with slaves by British slave traders.

=== Arguments ===
Towards the end of the 18th century, protests against slavery began to grow. The long sea voyages under bad conditions caused many casualties. Shipwrecks occurred regularly. Christian groups in particular drew attention to the poor living conditions of the slaves. But there was also protest about the hardships suffered by the soldiers who had to supervise the slaves. Both in Africa and Central America, soldiers were struck down by tropical diseases.

In economic terms, the slave trade became less important with the emergence of the European sugar beet cultivation. Africa changed from an area where "raw materials" (slaves) were extracted into a potential market for Europe. The development of agricultural machinery provided an additional reason to abolish slavery; the use of machines made slaves obsolete.

=== Abolition ===
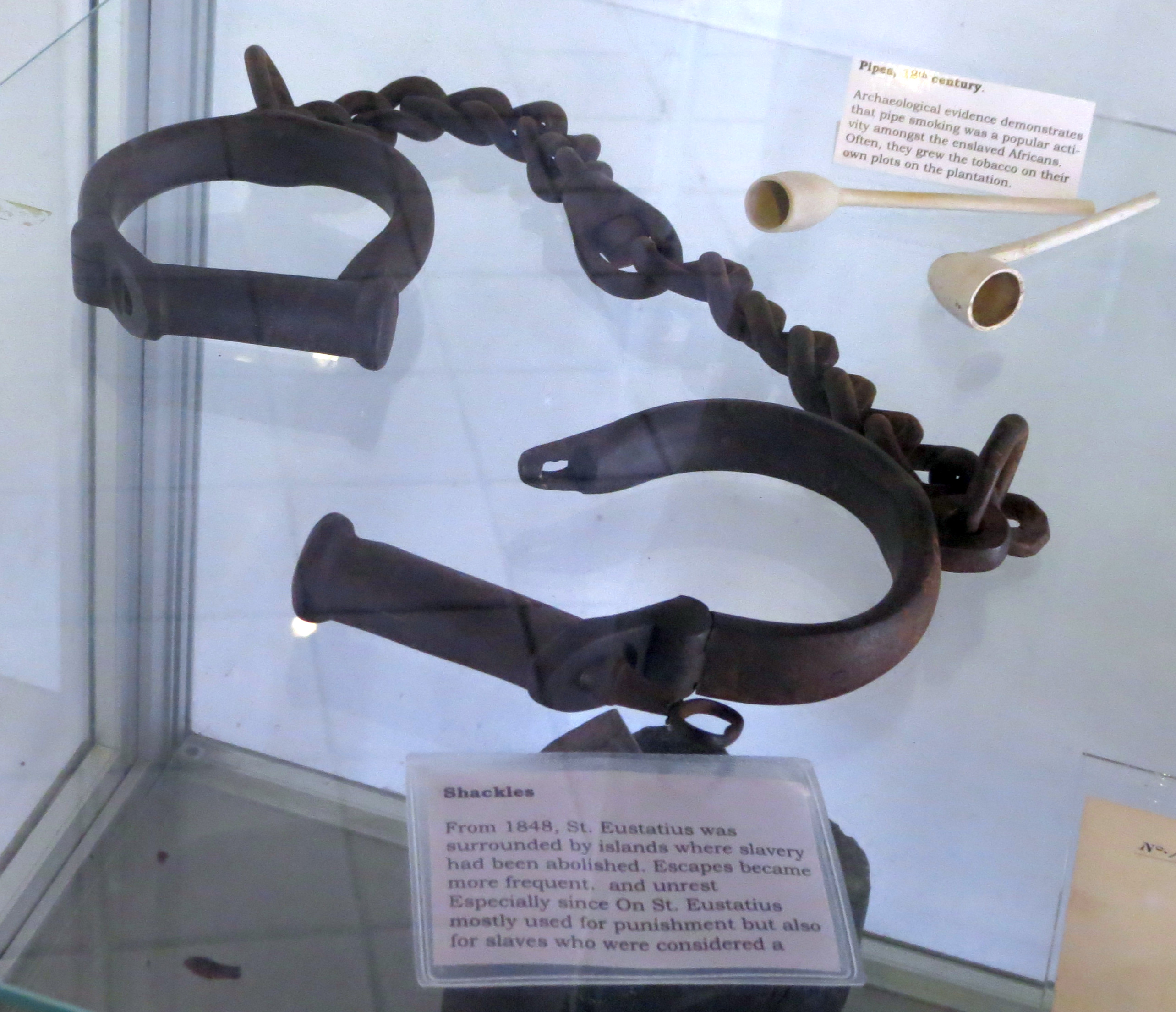
Slave handcuffs from 1848, which were to prevent slaves from fleeing from Sint Eustatius to free Saint Kitts.

Meanwhile, the United Kingdom had banned the slave trade. When William I returned from exile, he placated the British by not allowing a continuation of the Dutch slave trade. This made them willing to give back the Dutch colonies that had come under British control during the wars, although the British retained the Cape Colony. Finally, the Dutch slave trade was abolished in June 1814 by Royal Decree from William I. In May 1818, the United Kingdom and the Netherlands concluded an Anglo-Dutch Slave Trade Treaty, which, among other things, provided for the establishment of two Joint Courts of Justice to convict slavers who tried to evade the ban. However, the legal slave trade within the Caribbean continued as usual. The United Kingdom abolished slavery in 1833, resulting in Dutch slaves fleeing from Sint Eustatius to the nearby British colony of Saint Kitts.

== Abolition of slavery ==
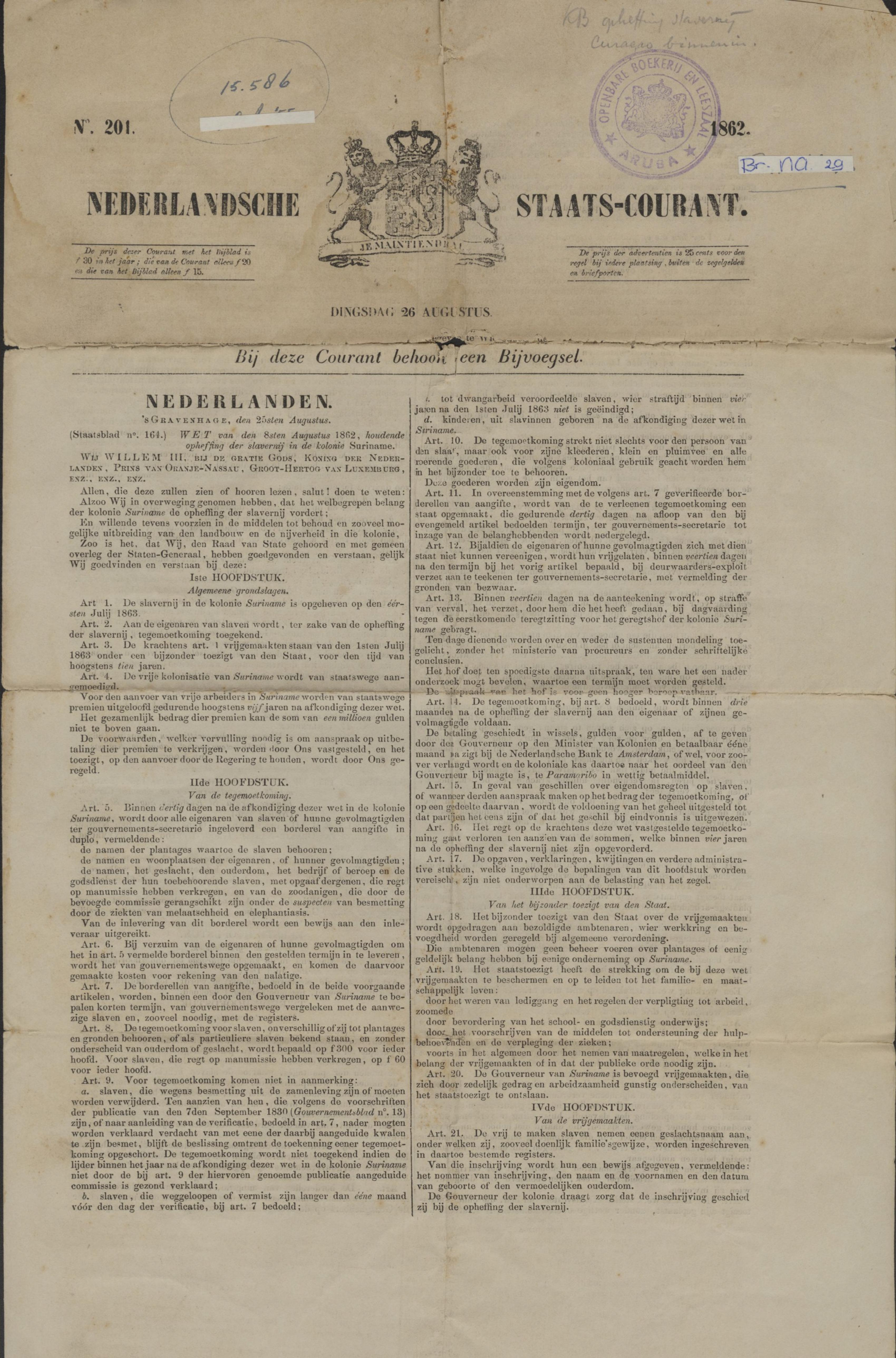
Netherlands State Gazette (No. 201. Tuesday, 26 August 1862) Laws for the abolition of Slavery

The Netherlands abolished slavery in stages, first in the directly governed parts of the Dutch East Indies with effect from 1 January 1860 (Law establishing the Regulations on the Policy of the Government of the Netherlands Indies), then in Suriname and the Netherlands Antilles on 1 July 1863 (Emancipation Act). On that day, about 35,000 slaves in Suriname and 12,000 slaves on the Dutch islands in the Caribbean were given their freedom.

Slavery continued to exist in some parts of the Dutch East Indies under indirect rule. On the island of Sumbawa this lasted until 31 March 1910, on Samosir even longer.

Ketikoti is an annual holiday in Suriname, and also among Afro-Surinamese and Afro-Antilleans in the Netherlands, to commemorate the abolition of slavery. In 1963, the statue of Kwakoe was unveiled in Paramaribo, Suriname's capital city to commemorate the abolition of slavery. Since 2002 there is an official monument for remembrance of slavery in the Kingdom of the Netherlands in Amsterdam, the National Slavery History Monument.

=== Compensation for the slave owners ===
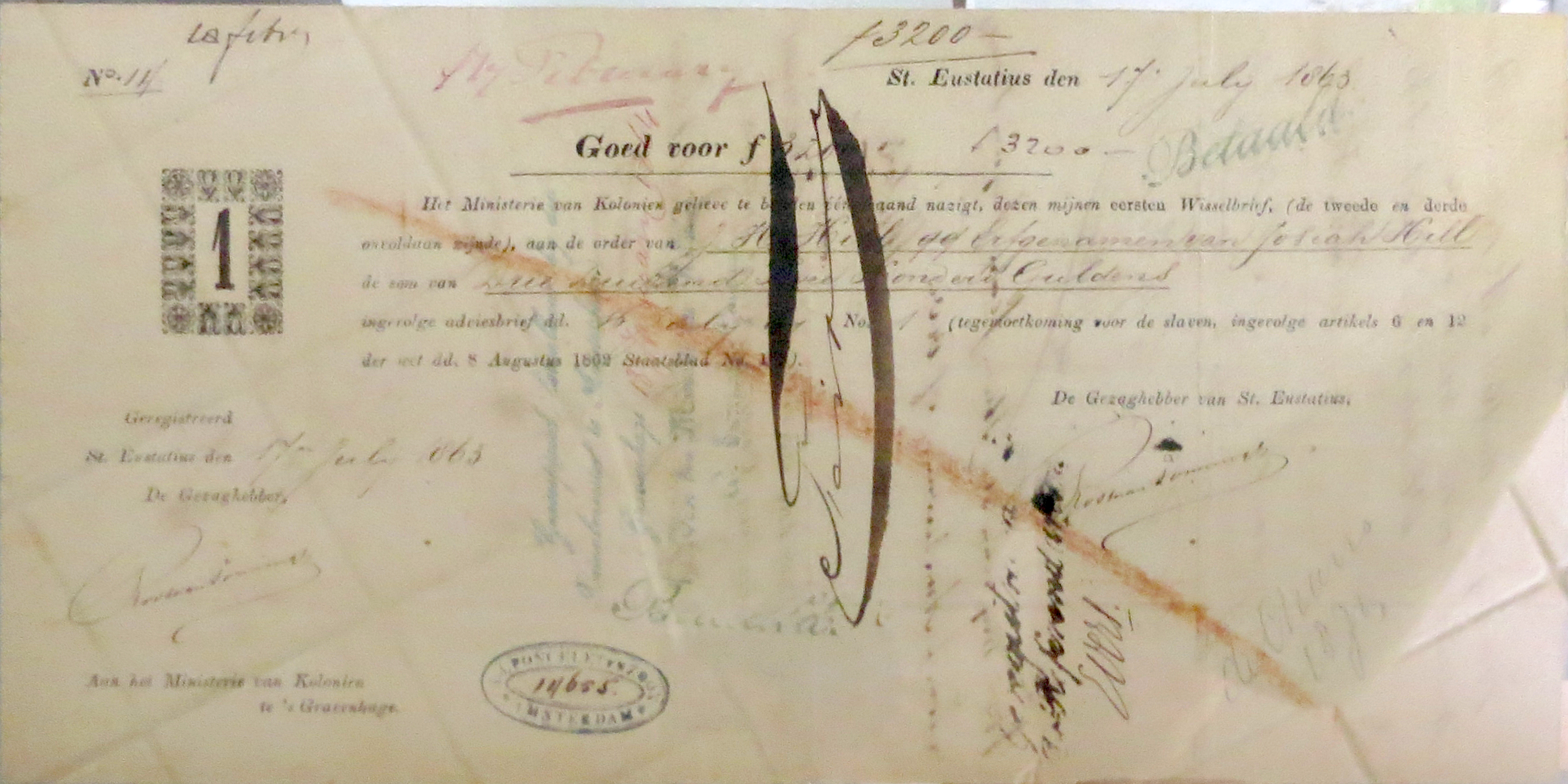
A checque for 3,200 guilders compensation for the abolition of slavery on Sint Eustatius in 1863

The abolition of slavery was referred to as "emancipation". Parties were organized in which King William III was presented as a key figure and benefactor of the freed slaves. The Dutch government paid compensation of 300 guilders per slave to the owner as compensation for the lost property (In the Dutch East Indies, it is 50 to 350 guilders depending on the age of the slave). In total, the allowance amounted to almost 12 million guilders, about 10% of the government expenditure in 1863.

As an alternative to the use of slaves, contract workers were recruited from the Dutch East Indies (Javanese Surinamese), India (Indo-Surinamese), and China (Chinese Surinamese).

In Suriname, the former slaves were placed under state supervision for a period of ten years and so they often continued to work on the same plantations. During this period, released plantation workers between the ages of 15 and 60 were obliged to conclude an employment contract. This measure was mainly intended to prevent the former slaves from leaving the plantations en masse, which presumably would have caused the collapse of the plantation economy.

=== Time line of the abolition of slavery in the Netherlands and its colonial empire ===
- 1814 – Transatlantic slave trade abolished.
- 1860 – Dutch East Indies – only in the directly administered areas.
- 1863 – Dutch West Indies – Emancipation Act abolishes slavery in the Dutch West Indies. Slave owners receive compensation; freedmen in Suriname come under state supervision for ten years with a mandatory employment contract on the plantations.
- 1872 – Dutch Gold Coast – colony sold to Great Britain, in which slavery had already been abolished.
- 1873 – Dutch West Indies – state supervision and compulsory employment contract abolished.
- 1877 – Dutch East Indies – Island of Bali
- 1910 – Dutch East Indies – Island of Sumbawa – 31 March
- 1914 – Dutch East Indies – Island of Samosir – probably the last part of the Dutch colonial empire where slavery was abolished.

== Numbers ==
In all Dutch traders shipped and sold between 550,000 and 850,000 slaves in the Atlantic area: first to Brazil, later mainly to Suriname and the Antilles. Historian Matthias van Rossum estimates that throughout history between 660,000 and 1,135,000 slaves were traded in order to provide labor to the Dutch settlement areas in Asia. In addition to the VOC itself, this also concerns slave ownership of the European, Eurasian and non-European inhabitants of these areas. But historian Paul Doolan argues that it was not simply a matter of numbers, but that between 1637 and 1644 the Dutch contribution was "crucial in shaping the transatlantic slave trade." When slavery was abolished in 1863, the registers speak of 32,911 persons in Suriname and approximately 11,800 in the Antilles.

== National Slavery History Monument ==
The National Slavery History Monument was unveiled on 1 July 2002 in the Oosterpark in the presence of Queen Beatrix and many other invited guests from both the Netherlands and abroad. In particular, the monument commemorates the slavery past in Suriname, the Netherlands Antilles, Aruba, and the west coast of Africa, including Ghana.

Monuments have also been placed in various other places in the Netherlands, such as in Rotterdam in 2013.

== Dutch in slavery ==
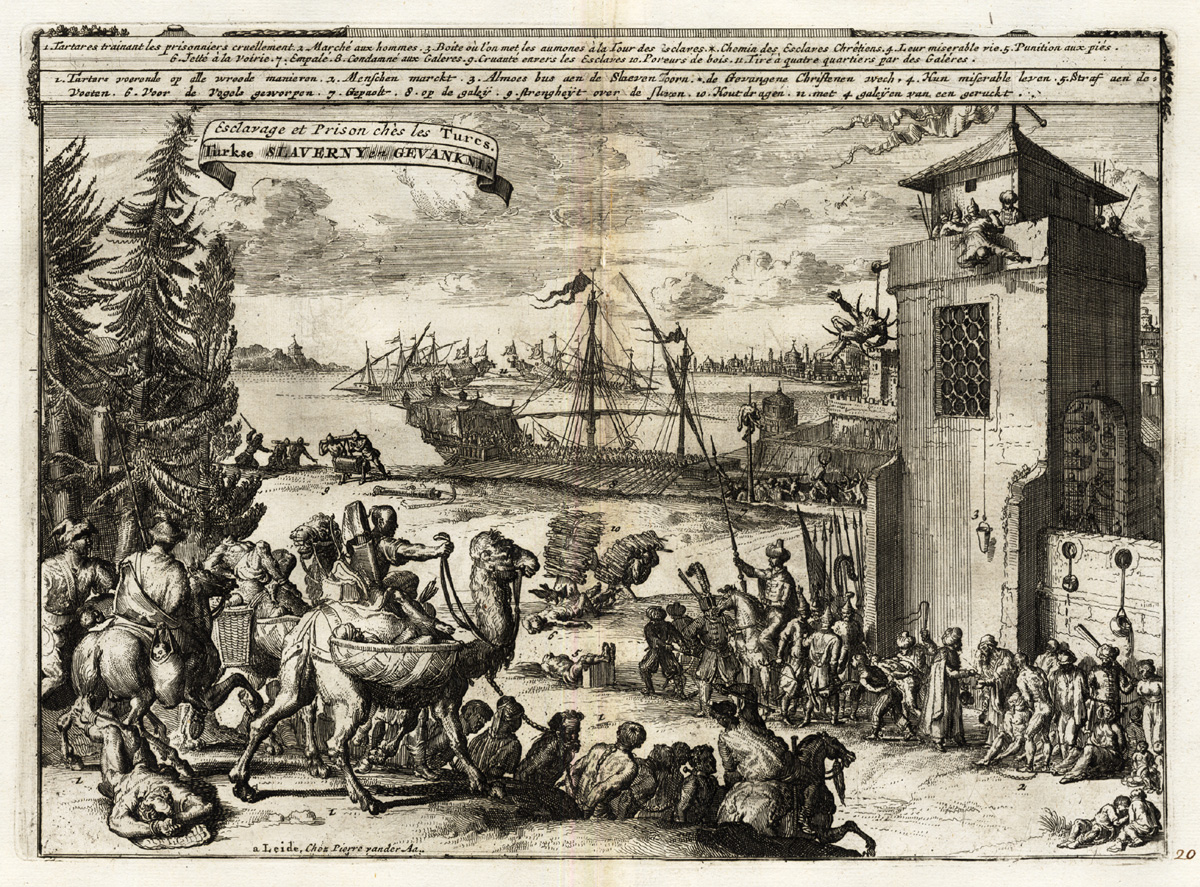
"Turkish use of slaves to row galleys", published by Pieter van der Aa, Leyden, circa 1725

The Dutch were also enslaved after the Middle Ages. In particular, North African privateers and merchants, also known as Barbary pirates, operating under the banner of the Ottoman Empire, targeted Europeans for, among other things, construction projects and as galley slaves. They were also not infrequently held captive with a view to obtaining ransom money from relatives or fellow believers. These Christian slaves were captured while hijacking sea-going vessels, as well as looting from the European coasts, including the Dutch ones.

The problem of the robbery of European slaves was especially great in the 17th and 18th centuries. Among the estimated 1 to 1.25 million persons captured as slaves during that period, approximately 10,000 to 12,000 were Dutch.

== Sources ==
- Amsterdam en slavernij, Stadsarchief Amsterdam
- Thema Slavernij Geschiedenis Zeeland
- ‘Swart’ in Nederland – Afrikanen en Creolen in de Noordelijke Nederlanden
- Canon of the Netherlands: Slavery

== Literature ==
- Pepijn Brandon, Guno Jones, Nancy Jouwe and Mathhias van Rossum (red.): De slavernij in Oost en West. Het Amsterdam-onderzoek. Spectrum. 2020.
- Emmer, P. C. (2000): The Dutch slave trade, 1500–1850, Arbeiderspers,
- Klein, H. S. (2010): The Atlantic Slave Trade. New approaches to the Americas, Cambridge University Press,
- Klooster, W. (1998): Illicit riches, KITLV Press,
- Postma, J.M. (1990): The Dutch in the Atlantic slave trade, 1600–1815, Cambridge University Press,
- Stipriaan, A. van; Heilbron, W.; Bijnaar, A.; Smeulders, V. (2007): Op zoek naar de stilte. Sporen van het slavernijverleden in Nederland, KITLV Press.
- Den Heijer, H. (2013): Geschiedenis van de WIC, Amsterdam University Press
