= Banamba (dance) =

Genre of dance and music from Suriname

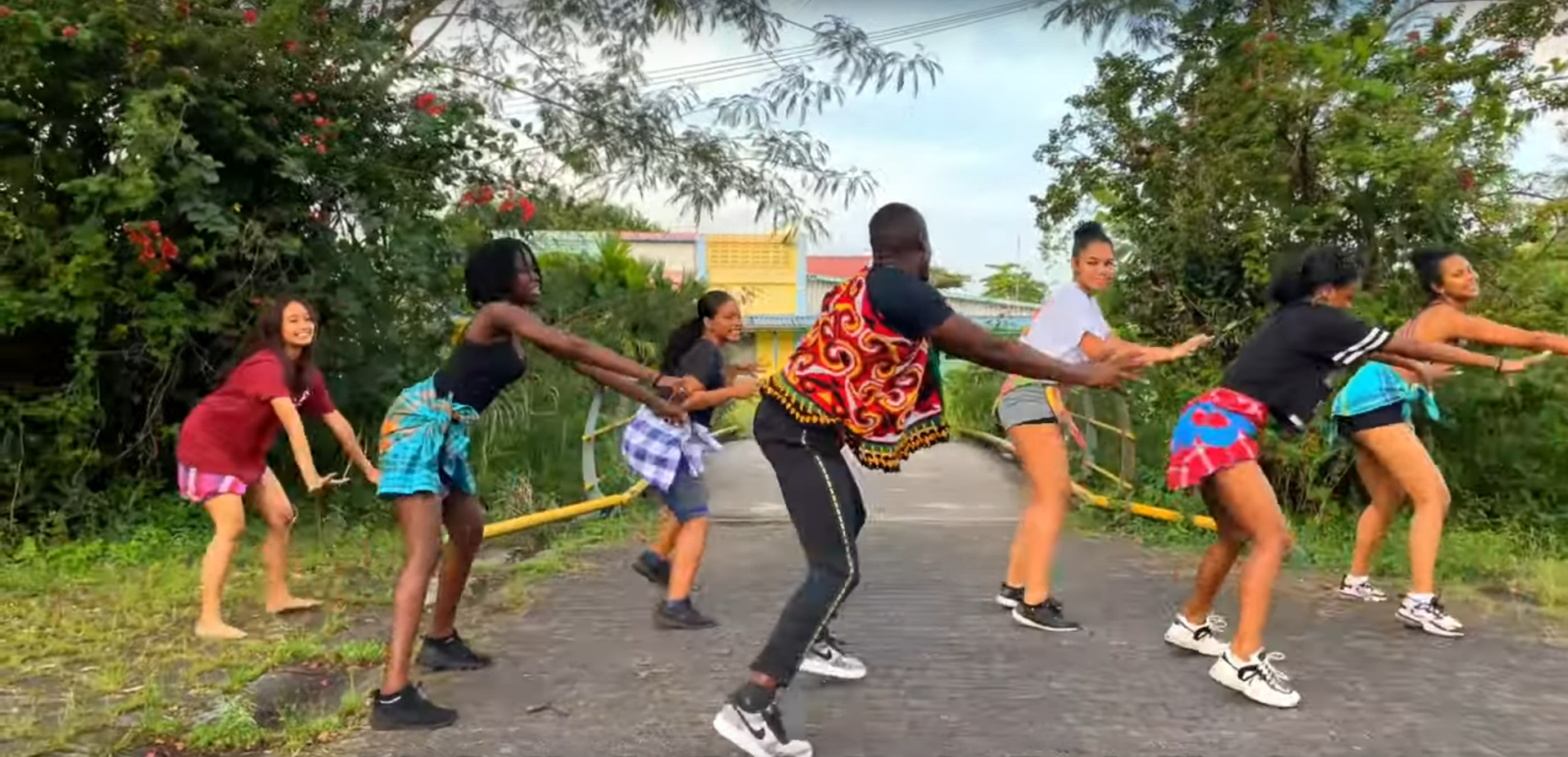
- Choreography by Winston Adaba
- Origin: Suriname

Banamba, also called bandámmba, is a genre of dance and music from Suriname. The dance is called the "Saramaccan beauty dance" (Dutch: Saramaccaanse schoonheidsdans).

== Description ==
The dance can be performed either solo or as a group. Its primary movements involve swinging of the hips and shaking of the buttocks. The music has a characteristic banamba rhythm (Saramaccan: banamba ridem).

The Banamba genre originated during the slavery era, drawing from the Saramaccans' African heritage. At the beginning of the 21st century, Banamba is performed both as a form of entertainment and to mark official occasions, such as when a child receives a pangi or when the village welcomes guests.

Banamba dance is also popular for challenges, battles and festivals. Special banamba celebrations include the 2016 Banamba Riddim Party in Paranam, the 2022 Banamba Neti in Pokigron and recurring Banamba competitions in Paramaribo.

== Gallery ==
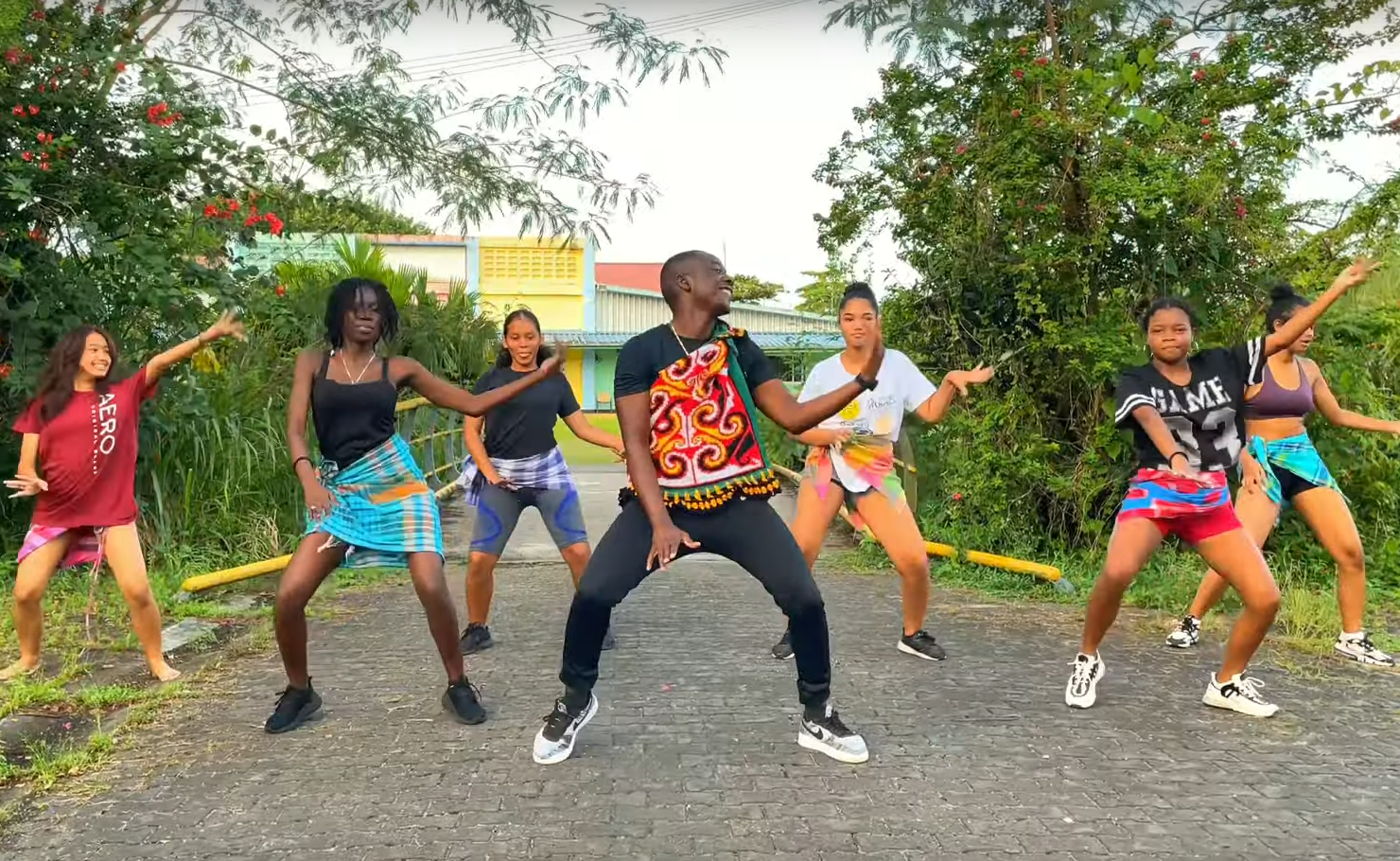

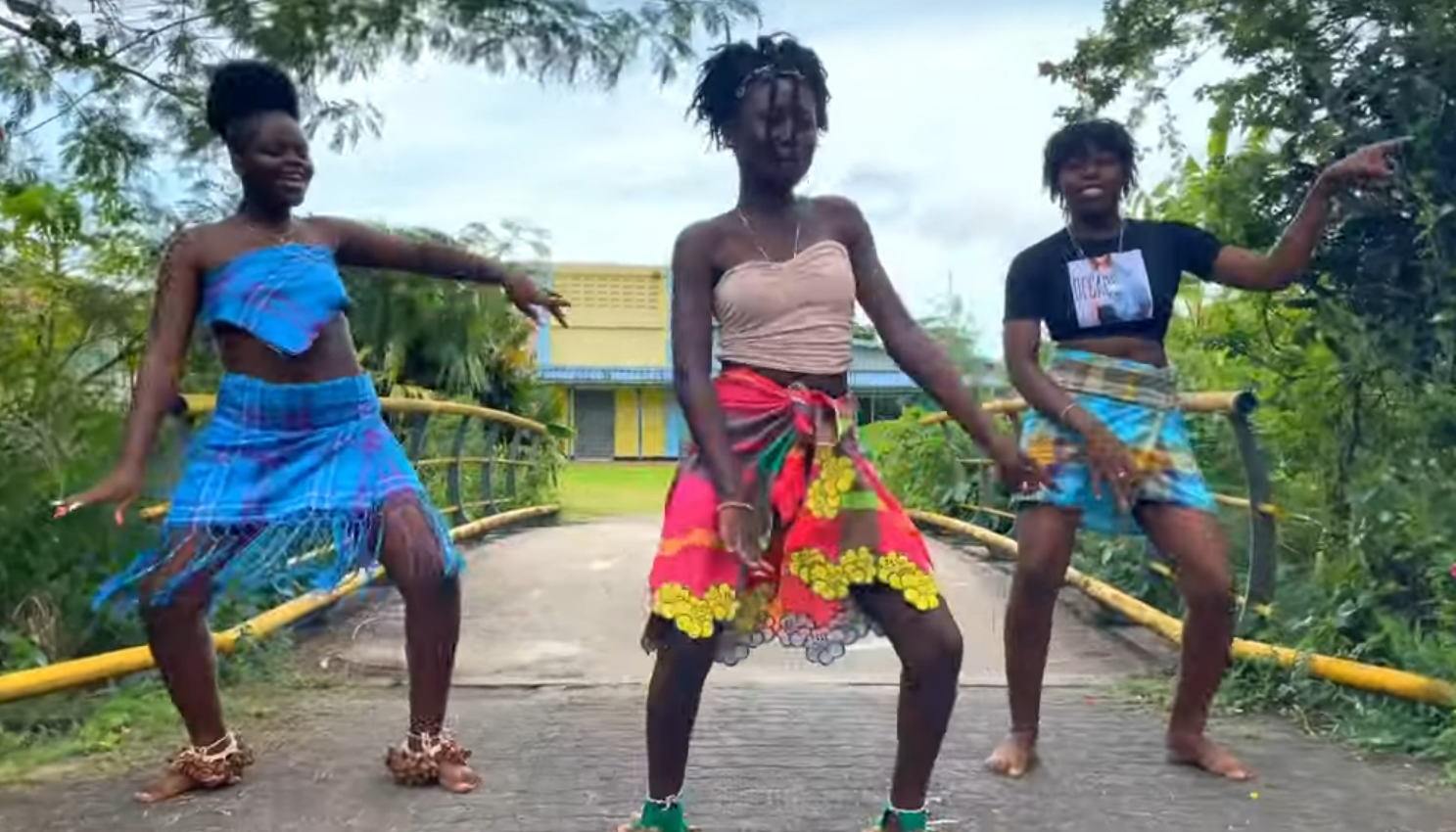

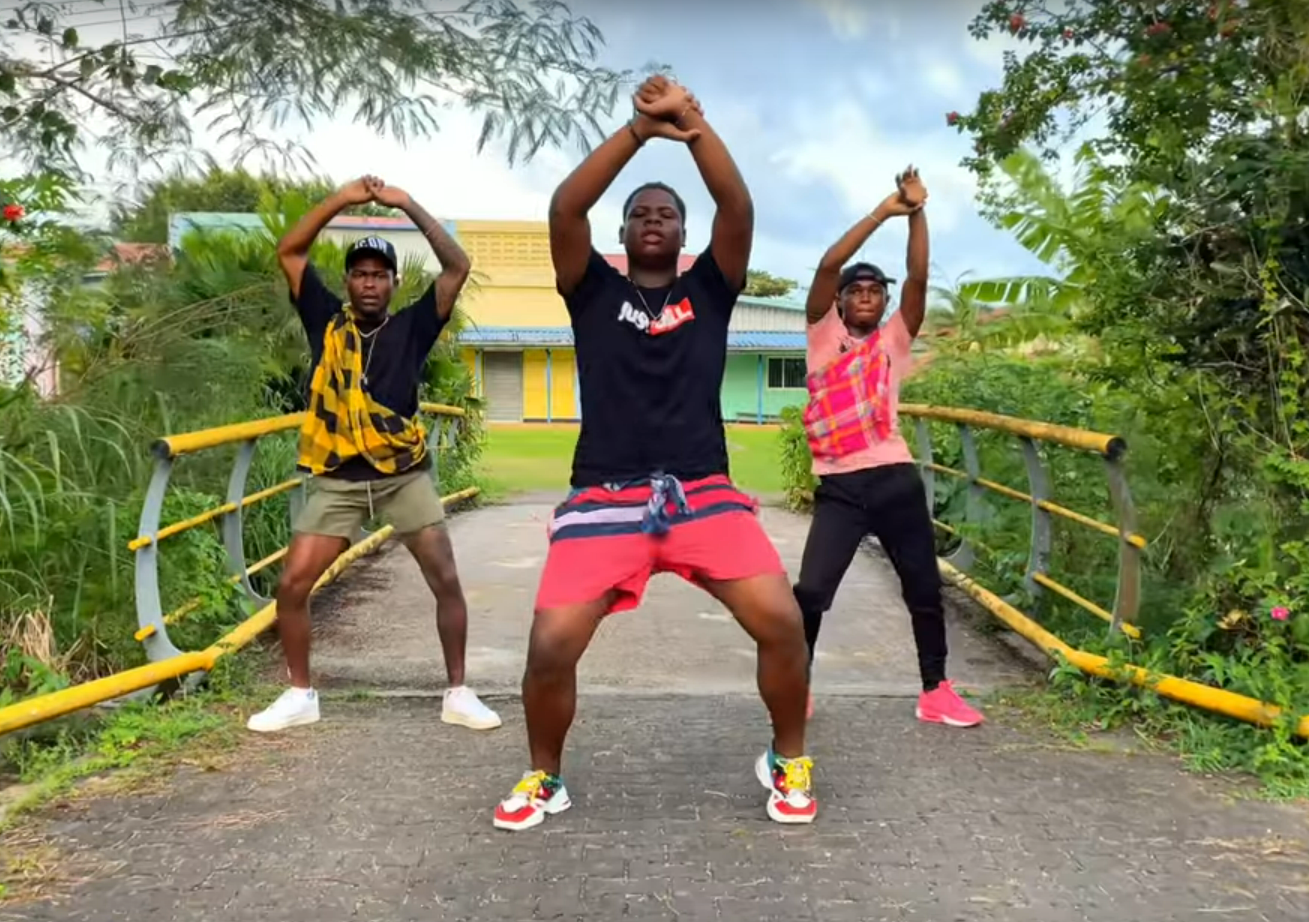

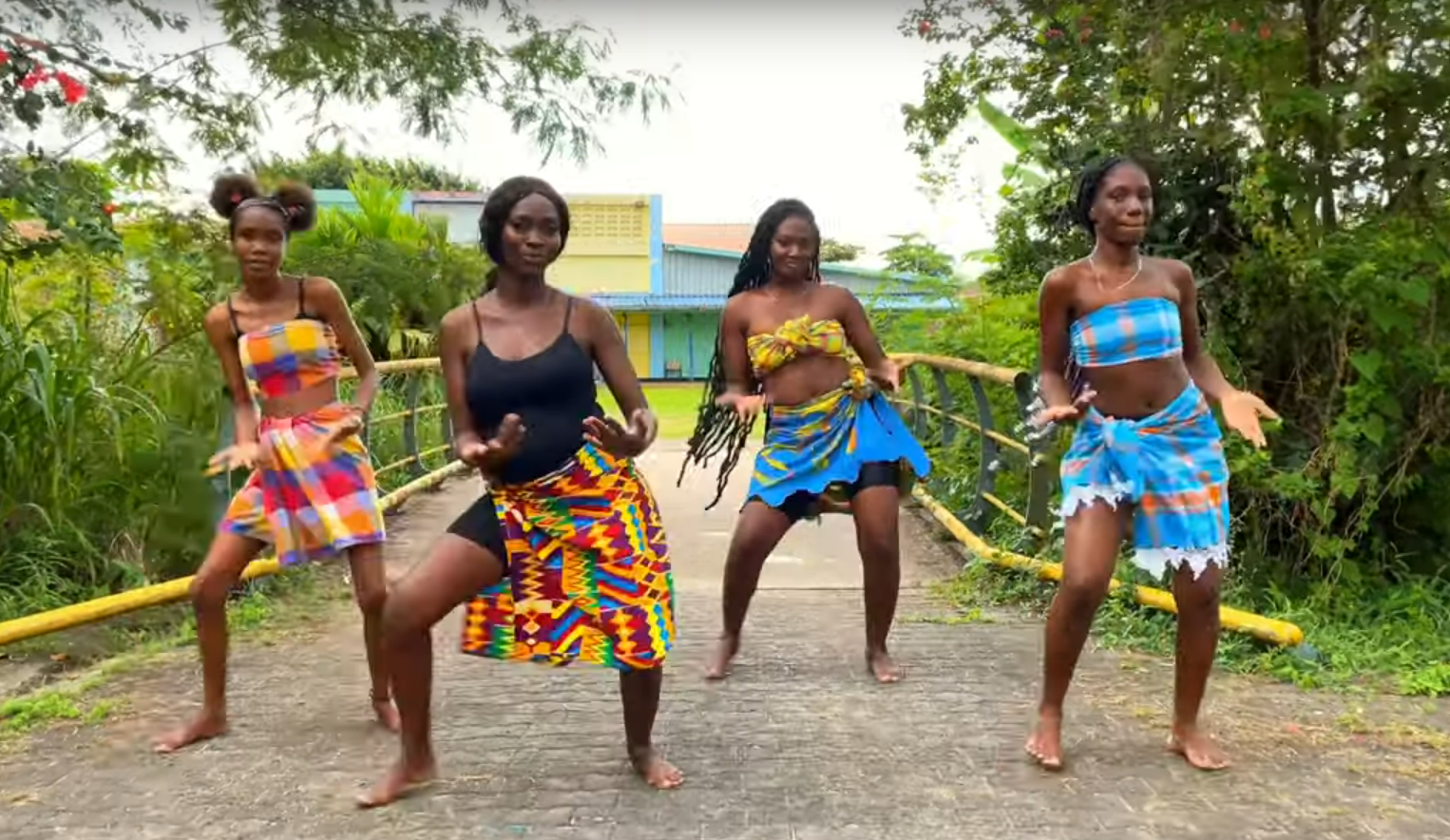

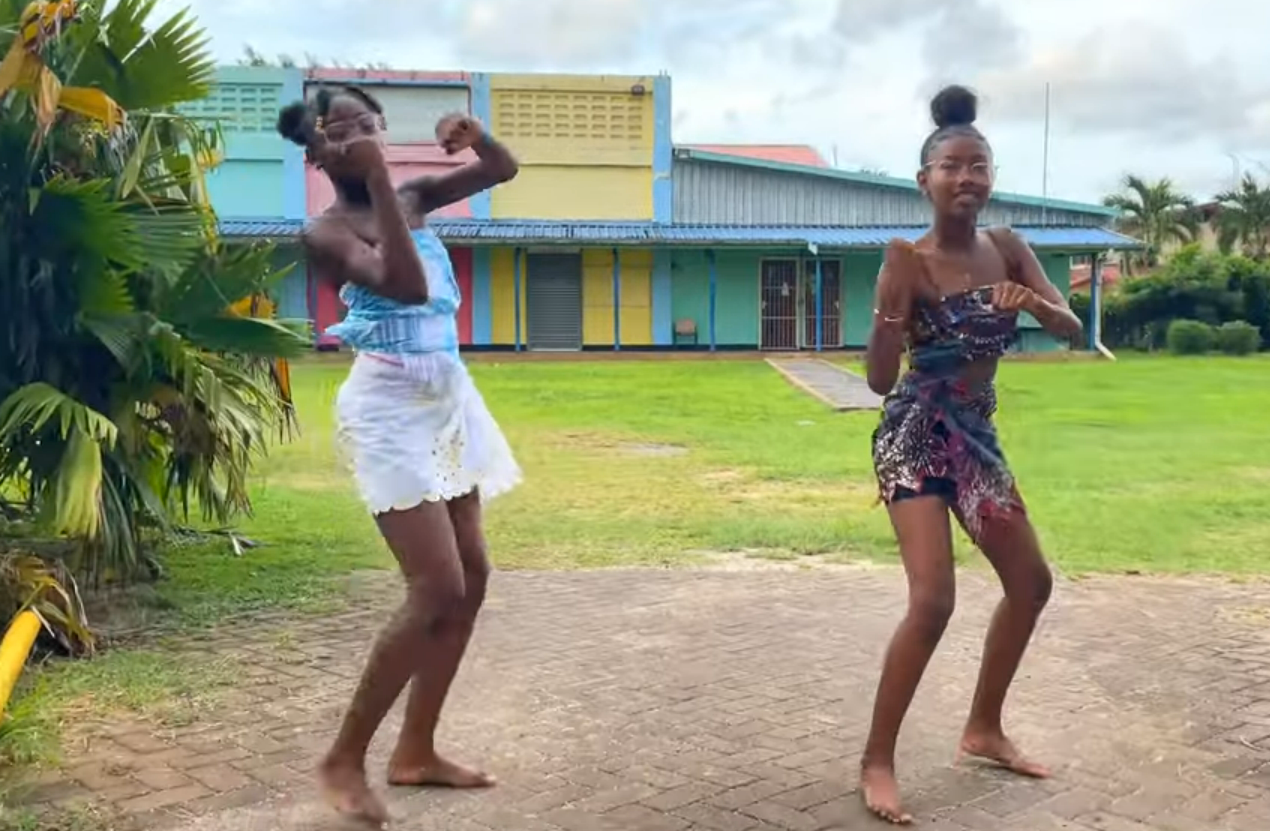

== See also ==
- Dance in Suriname
