= Karawaci =

Karawaci may refer to:

- Karawaci, Tangerang, a subdistrict of Tangerang, Banten, Indonesia
  - Lippo Karawaci, a planned community in the subdistrict

== See also ==
- Karawasi, a Surinamese musical instrument
