= Kwakoe =

Monument commemorating the abolition of slavery in Paramaribo, Suriname

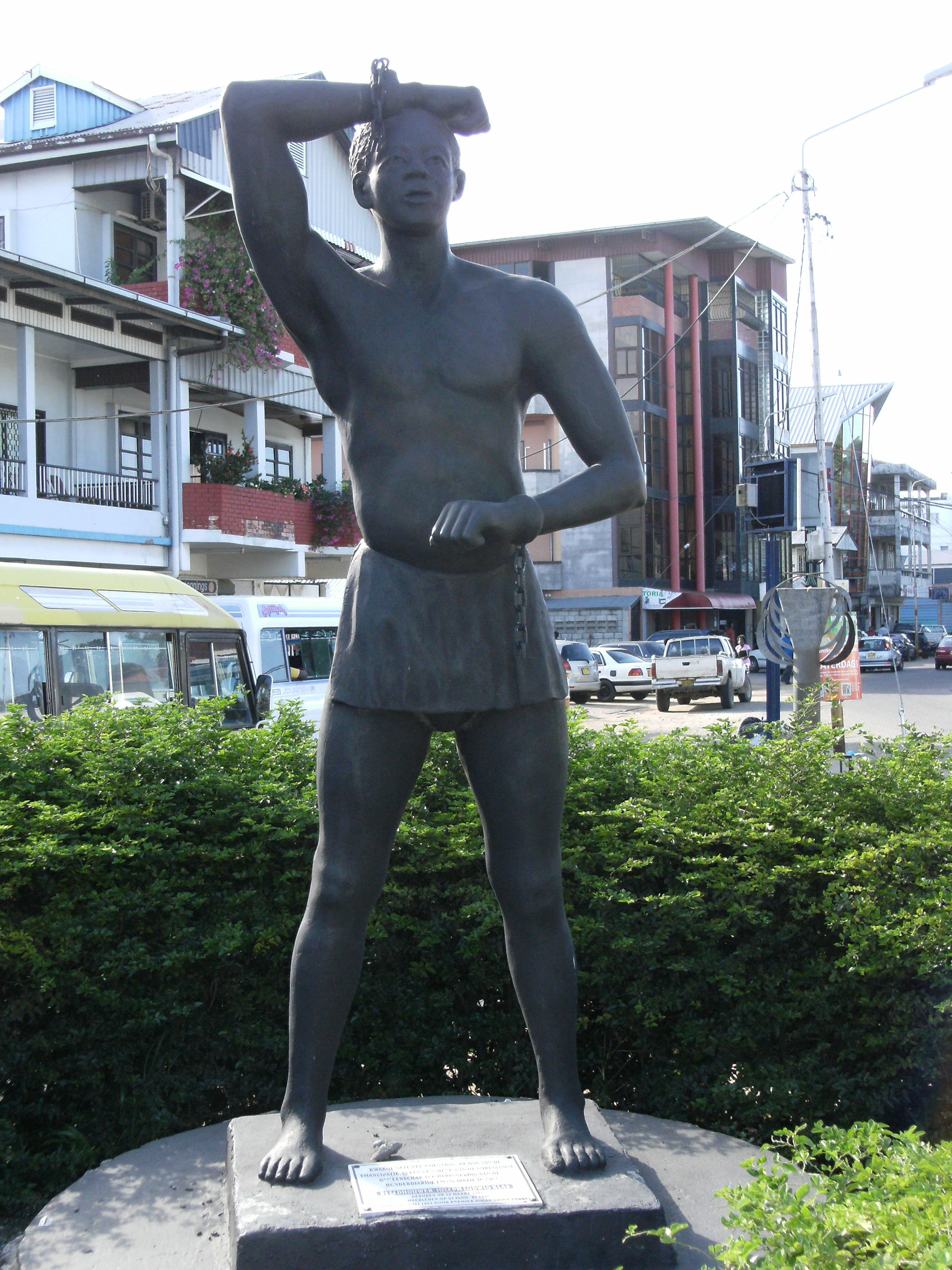
- Location: Paramaribo, Suriname
- Coordinates: 5.82515°N 55.16302°W
- Designer: Jozef Klas
- Type: Sculpture
- Opening date: June 30, 1963
- Dedicated to: Abolition of slavery

The statue of Kwakoe in the Surinamese capital Paramaribo is a monument commemorating the abolition of slavery. It was made by the sculptor Jozef Klas.

== Place and unveiling ==
The statue is located in Paramaribo, the capital of Suriname on the corner of Zwartenhovenbrug Street and Dr. Sophie Redmond Street, near the bus station known as Ondrobon. Prime Minister J.A. Pengel unveiled the sculpture on June 30, 1963, as part of the centenary of slave emancipation in Suriname on July 1, 1963. The statue depicts a freed African slave who has broken his chains. Kwakoe means Wednesday in the ritual Kromanti language of the Maroons of Suriname. The abolition of slavery fell on Wednesday, July 1, 1863. That day is known as Ketikoti.

== Committee ==
To realize the statue, a Committee of the Statue of Liberty was set up, a ladies' company led by Mrs. U. Breeveld-Silos. She was one of those who spoke at the unveiling in 1963. The youth choir of the ‘Evangelische Broedergemeente’ and the male choir ‘Harmonie’ performed and the florist L. de Gapadose offered a wreath in the colors of the Surinamese flag.

== Most popular image of Paramaribo ==
Paramaribo has many statues, but none of them has ever become as popular as that of Kwakoe. It does not represent a historical figure, although it has been said that Kwakoe would have been the first black landowner of Suriname. The statue of Jozef Klas was immediately adopted by the Afro-Surinamese as the best representation of the liberation from their history of slavery. To this day, it is regularly provided with headgear and garments, especially the pangi. These are the colorful shawls that are still worn by the maroons. The Kwakoe statue is regularly the meeting point for konmakandras (meaning meeting in the Sranan Tongo language of Suriname), encounters and manifestations.

== Jozef Klas ==
Sculptor and painter Jozef Klas (Hannover 1923 - Paramaribo 1996) also made the statue of Mama Sranan, a unity monument, depicting a woman who keeps her children embraced. This statue did not acquire the same appeal as the Kwakoe monument. After spending several years in the Netherlands, he returned to Suriname. His request for Surinamese citizenship remained unanswered. In February 1978, Klas started a hunger strike and chained himself to the Kwakoe statue.

== Kwakoe Festival ==
Kwakoe is also the name of a summer festival that has been held almost every year since 1975 during a number of weekends in the Nelson Mandela Park in Amsterdam-Zuidoost in the Netherlands. It is originally a Surinamese festival but has developed into a multicultural festival in recent years. The name Kwakoe has changed to Kwaku.

== See also ==
- Ketikoti
