= Dance in Suriname =

Dancing in the country of Suriname

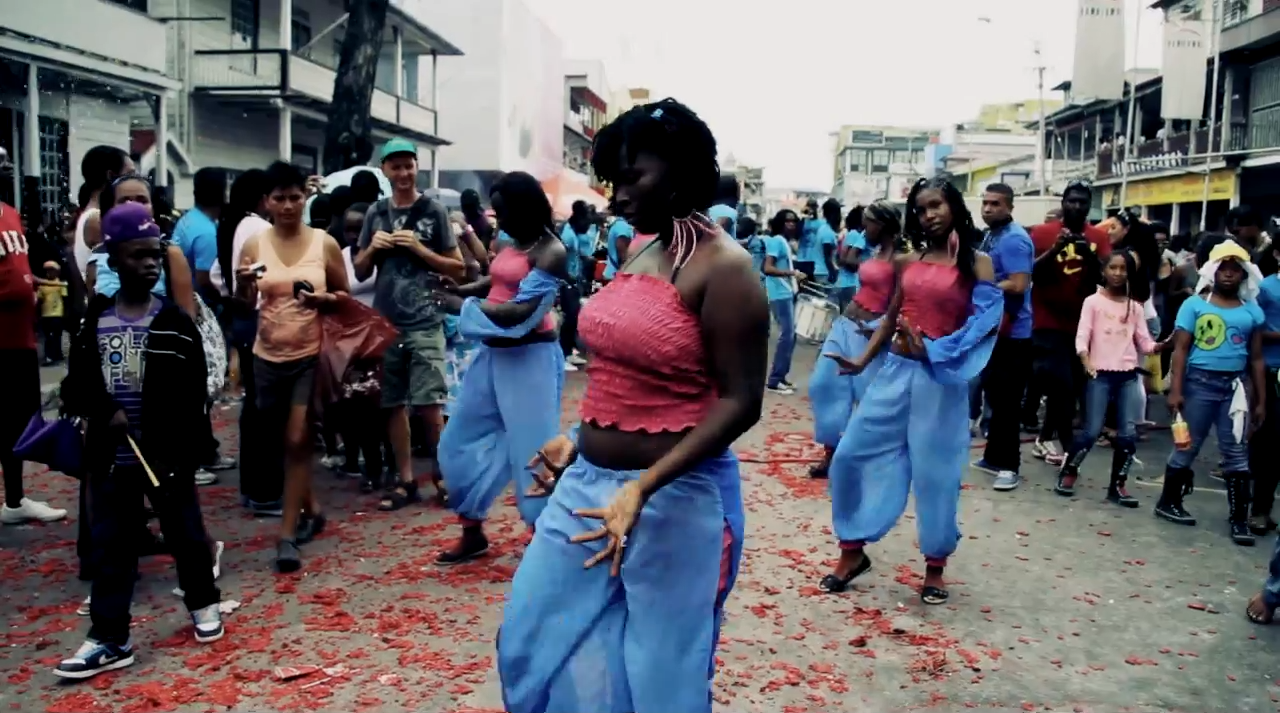
Owru yari (New Year's Eve), 2011

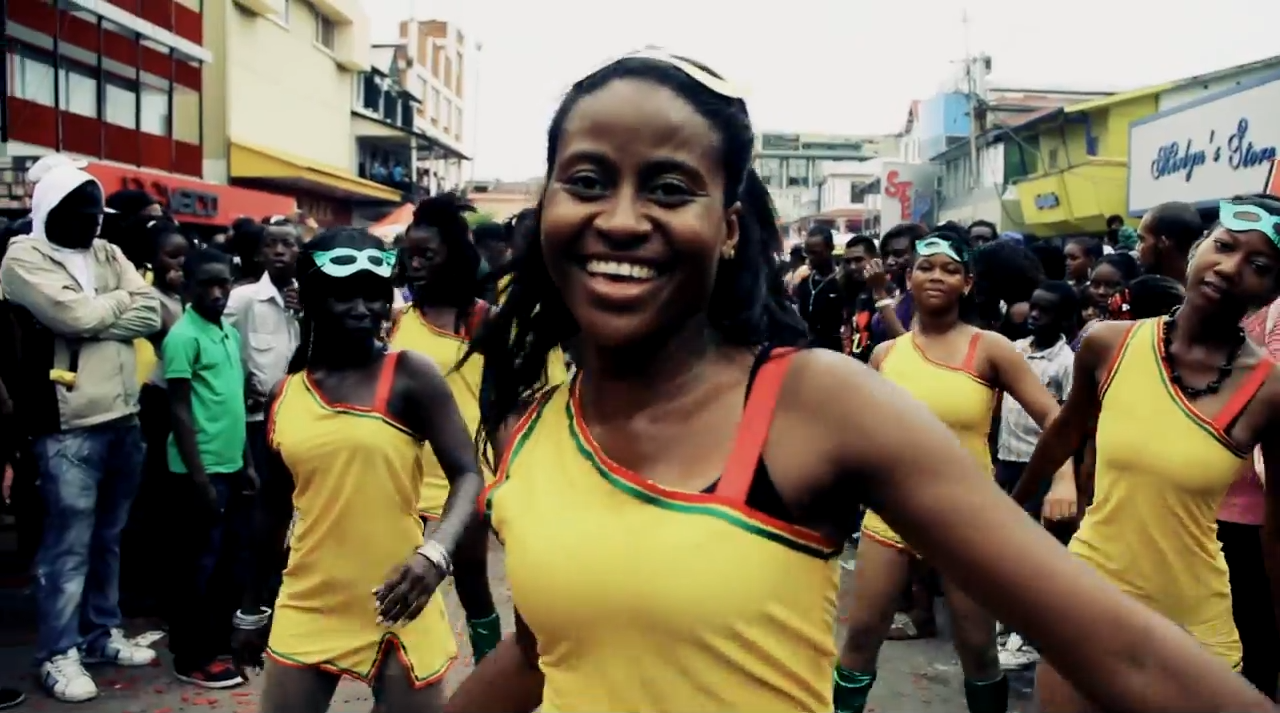
Owru yari (New Year's Eve), 2011

Dance in Suriname (Dutch: Dans in Suriname) is practiced from the amateur to the professional level for cultural, social and spiritual reasons, among others. Suriname has a variety of traditional and contemporary dance styles which have developed from the cultures of its ethnic groups. In addition, several foreign popular styles have been adopted from the West, the greater Caribbean, Java and Bollywood.

== Origins ==
The indigenous populations had their own traditions, particularly ritual dances. During the colonial period, new immigrant populations brought their dances from Europe, Africa and Asia. This was followed by an influx of musical styles and their corresponding dances from other regions: lambada, merengue, and salsa from Latin America; wining, cadence rampa, and reggae from the Caribbean; and ballet and dances from various pop music styles of the Western world.

=== Indigenous ===
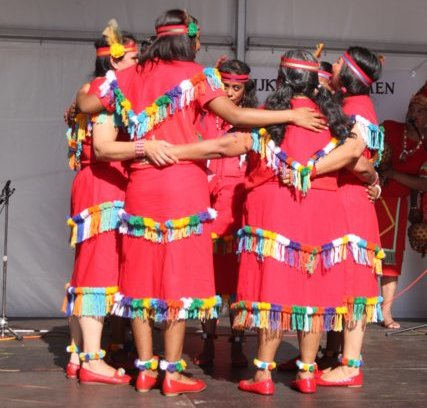
Surinamese indigenous dancers

At the end of the 20th century, there were around 20,000 indigenous Surinamese living in the country. From the initial colonization and subsequent evangelization, they have lost much of their intangible cultural heritage. Their musical ensembles, typically of the trios, were no longer allowed to use traditional instruments such as the flute. The rise of radio brought many young indigenous people into contact with pop music. Young Caribs in eastern Suriname came under the influence of the French-Antillean cadence rampa, while the Arawaks switched almost entirely to kawina music. During the 20th century, initiatives emerged to reverse the disappearance of indigenous culture, and also to revive old dances.

The maraca is a dance of the Caribs. With undulating forward movements, the dancers dance in a circle and bow to "Mother Earth". In karawasi and pyjai music, the Carib dancers also stand in a circle, with music intended to put the dancers into a trance. The maraca and krawasi are also found among the Wayanas. Due to evangelization, their cultural music had completely disappeared by the 20th century. The lost traditions were revived with help from Wayana populations in French Guiana. Compared to the Caribs, the Wayana people traditionally observe longer periods of mourning: their practice consists of three days and nights of playing music and drinking, a week of sleep, and then a resumption of music for three consecutive days.

=== Afro-Surinamese ===
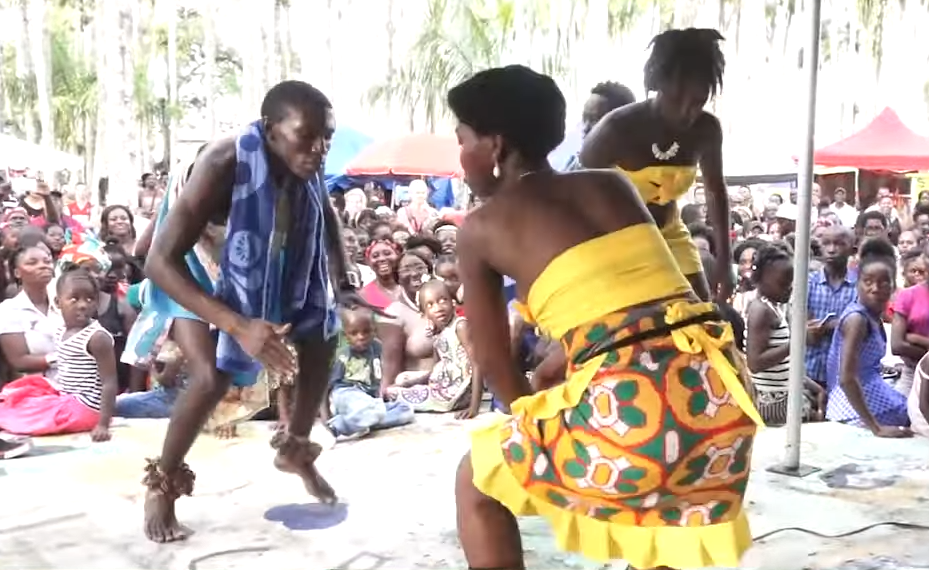
Awasa dancers

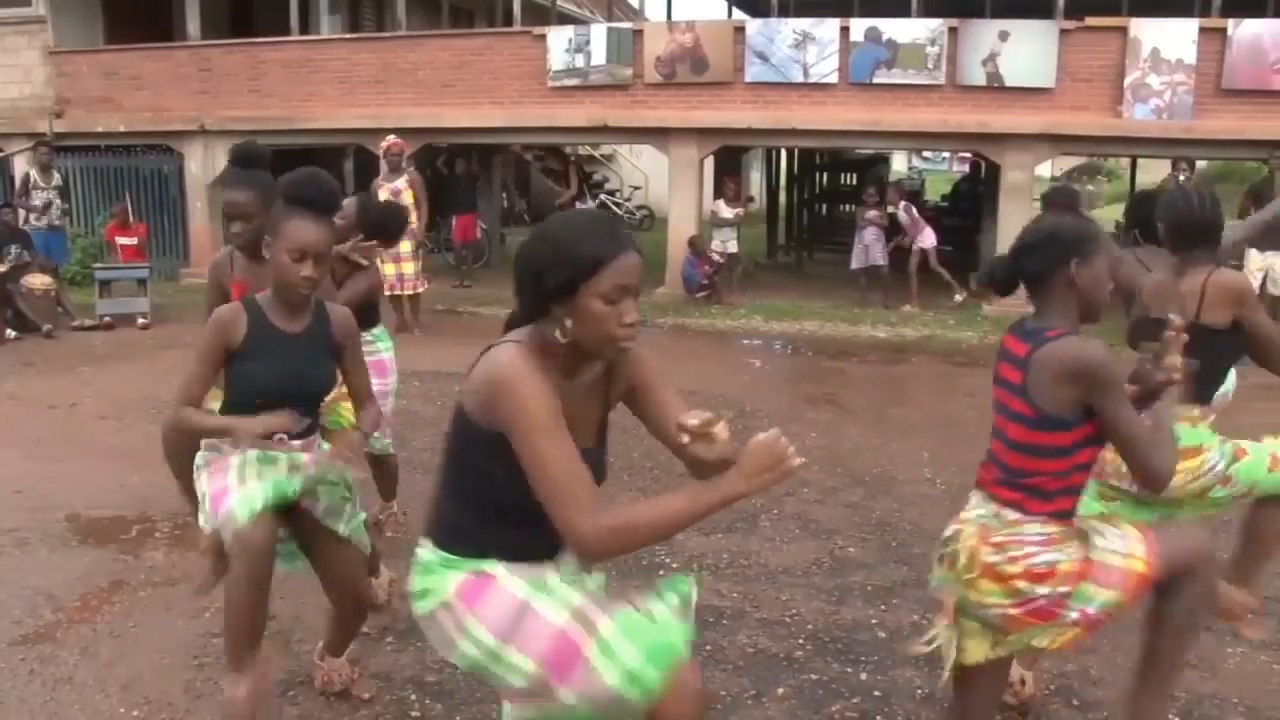
Moengo Festival, Tembe Art Studio, 2019

Almost all Afro-Surinamese music and dance is rooted in the Winti religion. Winti originated from West African religions (such as Vodun) and rituals; it also has Islamic elements. Upon arrival in Suriname, major differences among the non-homogeneous African cultures dissipated. Small distinctions still remained; for instance, certain Winti songs were unique to individual plantations. Those who fled the plantations - the Maroons - founded tribes of their own in the rainforest. Some of the Maroon tribes became sufficiently powerful that the colonial rulers concluded peace treaties with them. Due to a shortage of women, the Maroons remained in contact with the Creoles on the plantations, so the two cultures did not grow far apart. There were also City Creoles in Paramaribo, some of whom were freed, with others still in bondage. Since the abolition of slavery, a trend of migration to the capital from the plantations and the interior of the country began and continued until the beginning of the 21st century.

In Suriname, Winti continued to develop with Christian and indigenous influences. An example of an indigenous element is the style of dancing while bending knees for indji-winti (also ingi-winti), the entertaining winti gods who make pranks, obscene jokes and charades. Several original Winti dances also developed, such as the sekete among the Saramaka, and the awasa and songé among the Aukan, in which the dancers also make music by shaking instruments attached to their ankles. In the second half of the 19th century, various dance styles merged into the tuka style. Central to Winti is the belief in the supreme being, with each winti performing its own style of music and dance with a different character and color. The sokko and banja are important music and dance styles meant to evoke the spirits of ancestors. Each banja commences with praise of "Mother Earth". The ancient dance was performed primarily by dancers and, because of its beauty, was sometimes permitted and attended by plantation owners.

The party-banja, a drama style, was performed by a troupe (called party or doe-group). In it, regular characters acted as the Sisi (ceremonial leader), Aflaw (fainting lady) and the Datra (doctor). Due to disputes between troupes, doe-groups were later banned. Related to this style was the laku, in which the African boat was replaced by a contract labor ship with characters such as the Koeli (British Indian), the Koeli Konsro (British consul) and the Snesi (Chinese). Other forms of dance and drama included the susa, which was performed mainly by men, and the kangas, which is a collection of children's games and movements to music that have African origins.

==== Dragemans ====
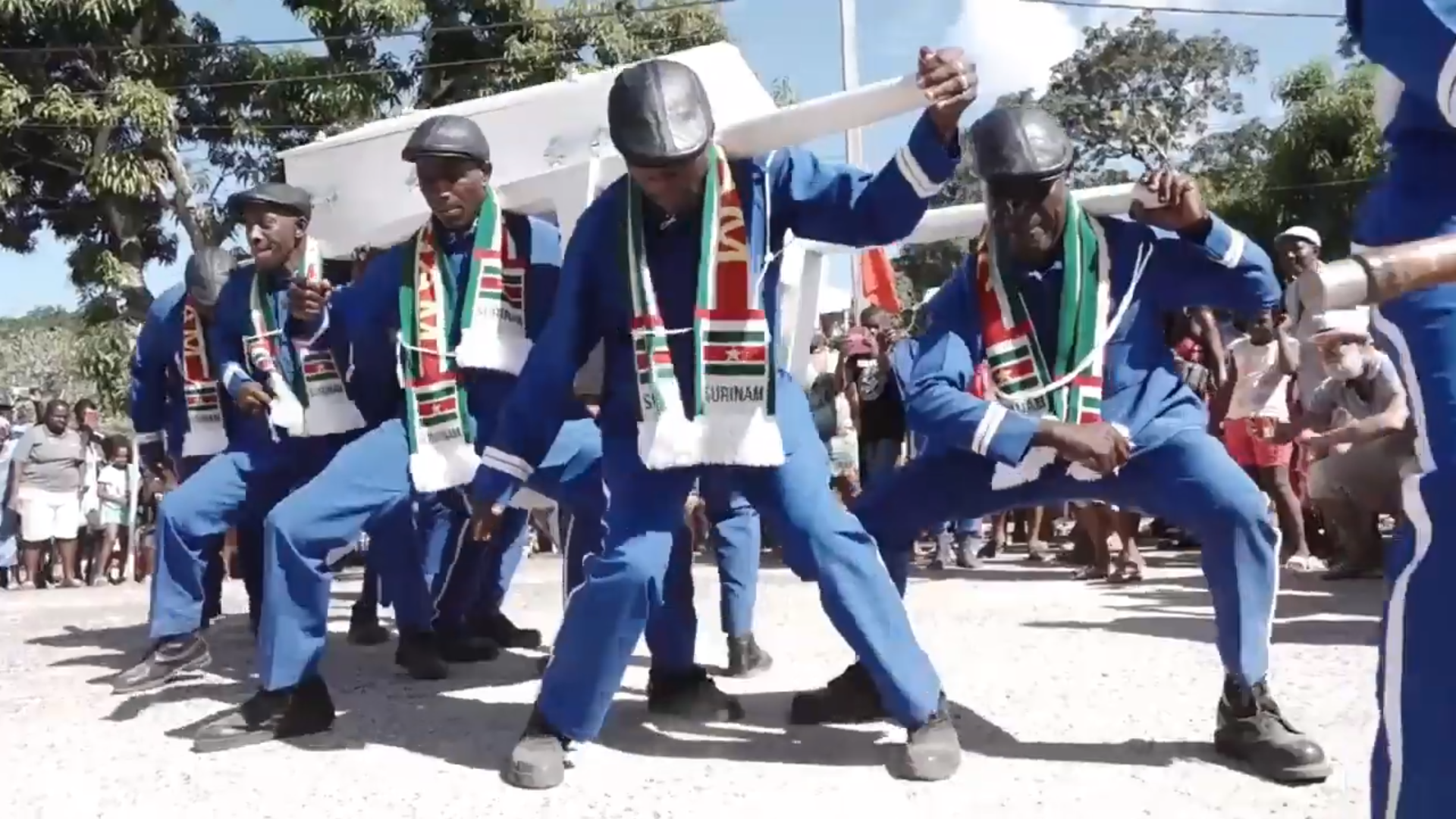
Performance for Drageman Dey, 2019

During funeral rites, the dragemans (pallbearers) perform mock marches, which are similar to dance steps. The steps are intended to free the soul from the body. Since 2003, an annual Drageman Dey (Drageman Day) has been organized around 20 September for pallbearers; in 2015 and 2017, the event included a contest for the best pallbearers.

=== Chinese ===
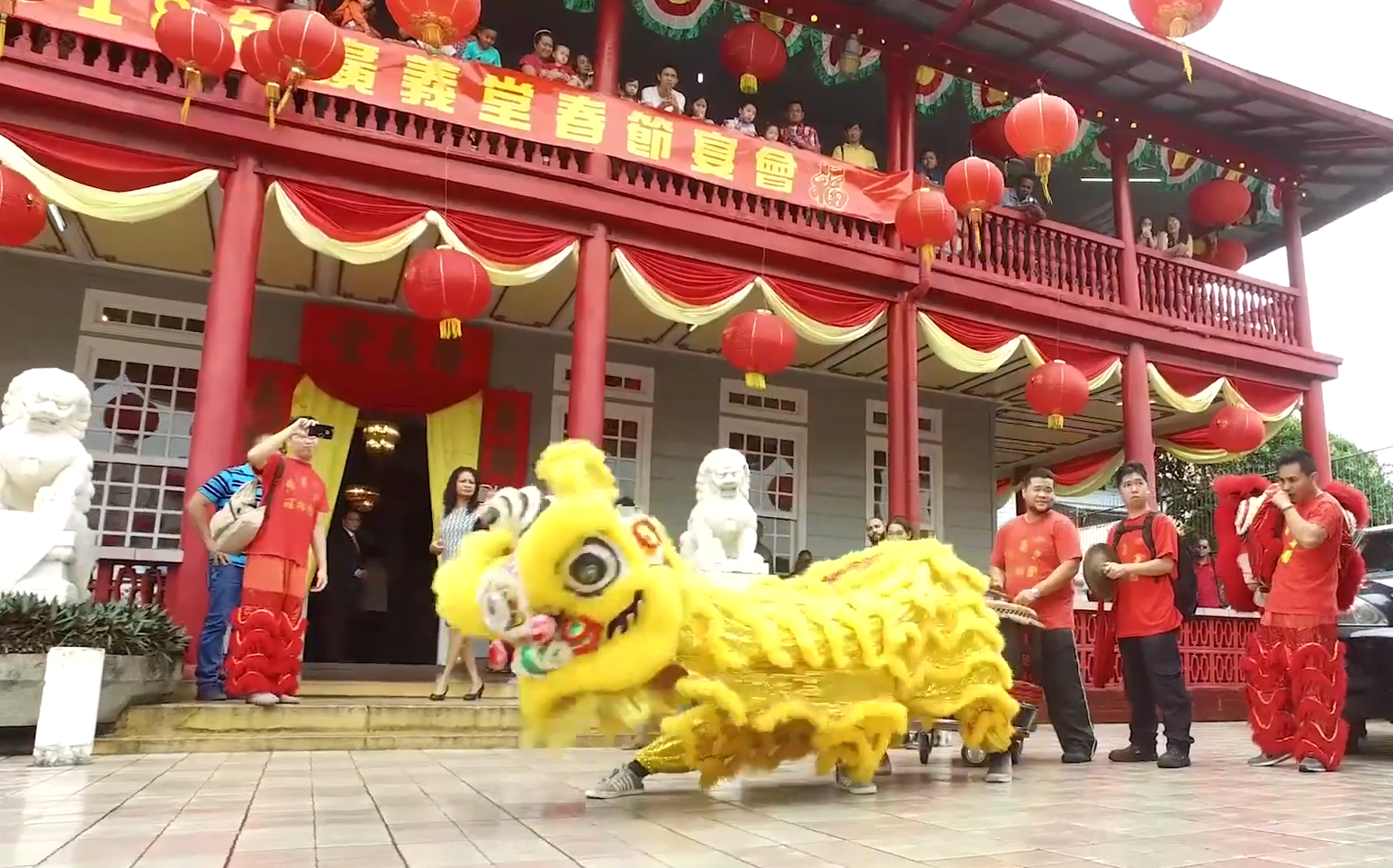
Chinese New Year, Paramaribo, 2019

Chinese were the first group of contract laborers to enter Suriname to solve the shortage of workers resulting from the abolition of slavery. The Chinese New Year is the annual event in which the Chinese culture is most visible to the other Surinamese population groups. The dragon dance ushers in the festivities, joined by family gatherings with meals, lanterns, lots of fireworks, and other dances performed by groups on stage. The dragon dance is performed by a team of two or more dancers that imitate a dragon in a costume with bright colours. The ceremony is traditionally meant to scare away evil spirits and is performed by Chinese worldwide during nearly all special festivals. This tradition started during the Han dynasty in the two centuries before CE.

=== Indo-Surinamese ===
Indo-Surinamese people brought Hindustani music from North India (especially Uttar Pradesh) to Suriname, which is one of the two main movements there besides Carnatic music from South India. One of the Indo-Surinamese dances that came along is the Chokrá; it was originally performed with two male dancers, one of whom was dressed as a woman. This was chosen in India after it was decided that women could only dance for a select company or in temples. After only the man dressed as a dancer remained, the name was changed to londa ke nác. Among young people, interest in this declined in the late 2010s, but it is still a popular dance.

From the desire of Indo-Surinamese youth to dance and have fun, rather than listen to moralistic baithak gana, the 20th century saw an increasing interest in Bollywood films. Hindi-language filmi music introduced styles such as disco and other pop, with a significant share for dance. Youths also established dance orchestras, which included Western instruments and performed various styles of music.

Bharatanatyam is a classical South Indian dance. It was introduced to Suriname in 1997 by Madhoerie Jagmohan, who moved from the Netherlands to Suriname for this purpose, and is also one of the dances performed in Marlène Lie A Ling's Folkloric Ensemble Paramaribo. Leading Surinamese dancers in this genre are Evita Issa, Namita Bhaggoe-Ajodhia and Sieske Rama, and it is generally performed by Indo-Surinamese.

The North Indian kathak is danced by Indo-Surinamese as well. The peasant dance nagara, which is danced to drums of the same name (nagaras), has virtually ceased to be popular in the early 2020s.

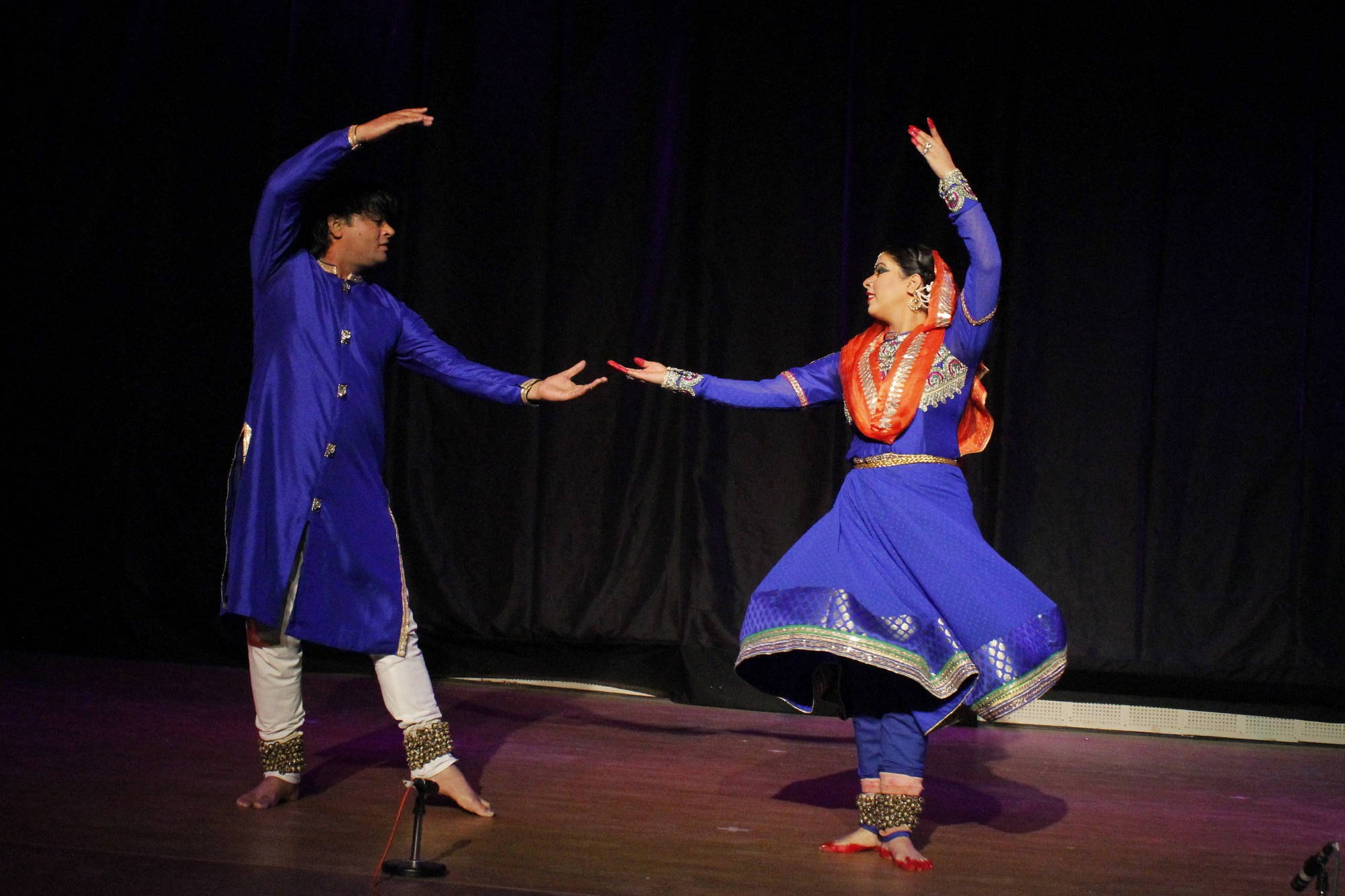
Kathak duet

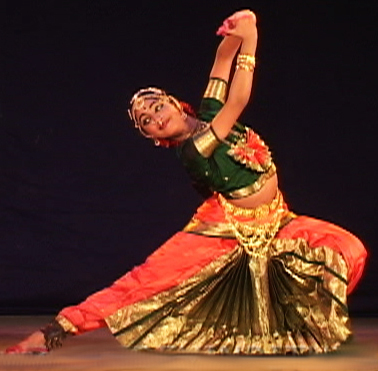
Bharatanatyam dancer

=== Javanese ===
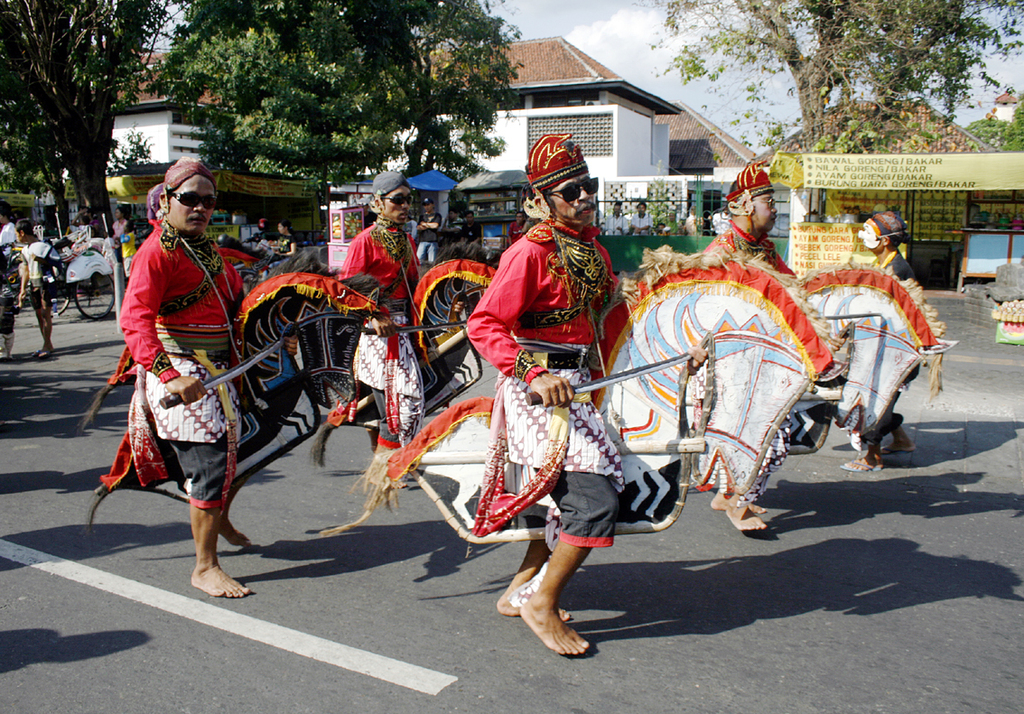
The horse dance Jaran Kepang

From the Dutch East Indies, Javanese people brought the horse dance Jaran Kepang. During the performance, the dancers sit on a stick horse woven from reeds. To the rhythm of gamelan music, they imitate a horse and rider. In a trance, they take on the behavior of a horse: galloping, kicking around and eating grass.

Javanese youths in Suriname at the end of the 20th century are also mainly interested in dance music styles, such as contemporary pop-Jawa, as well as local styles like Surinamese kaseko and Caribbean merengue, and less in styles of their ancestors, such as gamelan.

This has also created fusions. One example is of the traditional Javanese dance that evolved into a Surinamese modern dance style with classical, modern, jazz and Afro techniques and elements from Indian dances and the Javanese martial art pencak silat. The dance is accompanied by kaseko music, dressed in the Javanese selendang scarf, Javanese komprang pants, the Surinamese koto skirt, and the Creole angisa headscarf.

=== Western styles ===
A multitude of music from the Western world came in over the centuries, from world music to religious and light to classical. There were also styles that had their own further development in Suriname, including the set-dansi (related to the quadrille) by artists such as Jopie Vrieze and George Schermacher.

In 1952, the Cultural Center Suriname (CCS) established the country's first ballet school, and from 1973 ballet education continued through independent schools, where around a thousand students were enrolled by the mid-1970s. In addition, from 1978 until the 1990s there was the National Ballet Suriname, and since 1986 Surinamese ballet dancers have been performing internationally with Marlène's Ballet Company. One Surinamese form is the dogla style developed by Ilse-Marie Hajary. She blended jazz ballet with Afro-Caribbean movements and rhythms and added Indian movements with the hands, feet and head.

=== Developments and mixes ===
The dances from the various population groups together formed the basis for new developments. This often went parallel with the development of musical styles such as bigi-poku, kawina and kaseko. Even after that, dances continued to develop across the board in Suriname.

== Moengo Festival of Theatre & Dance ==
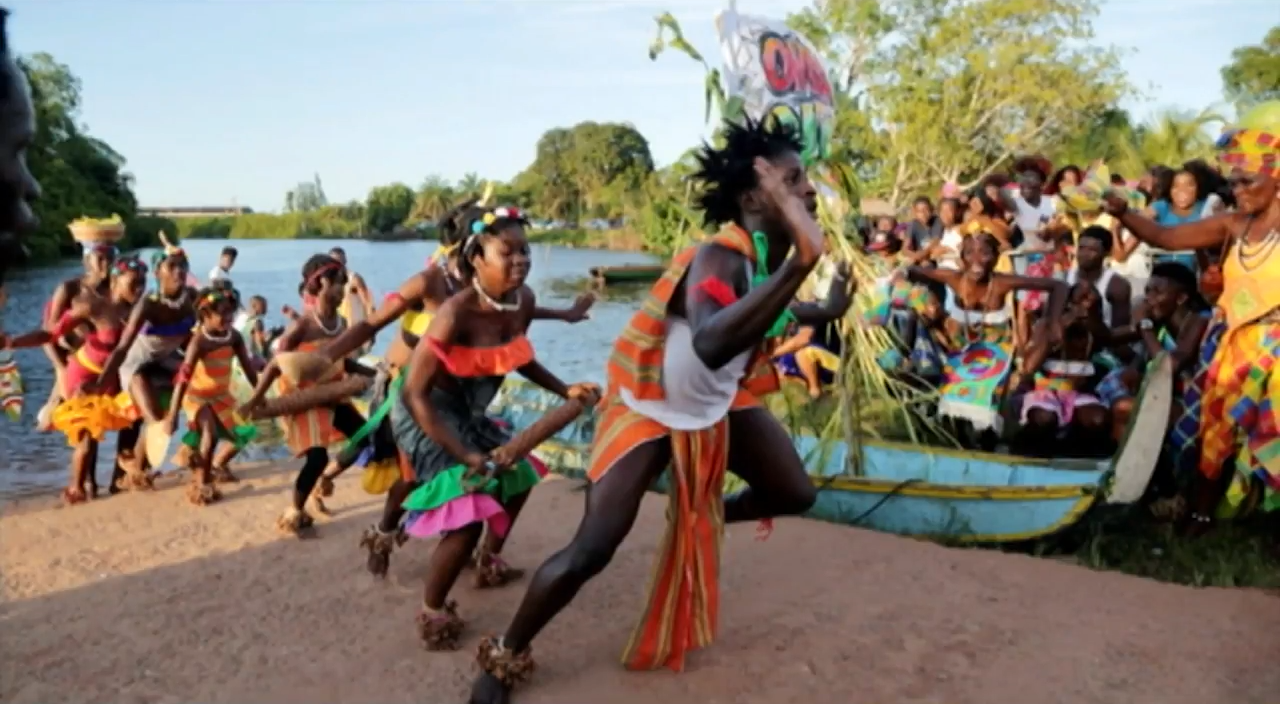
Poolo Boto, opening Moengo Festival, 2017

The Moengo Festival of Theatre & Dance is one of three versions of the Moengo Festival held every three years. This version was held in 2014 and 2017, attracting thousands of visitors each year. The festival changed its format in 2019; it was not held in 2020 due to the COVID-19 pandemic in Suriname.

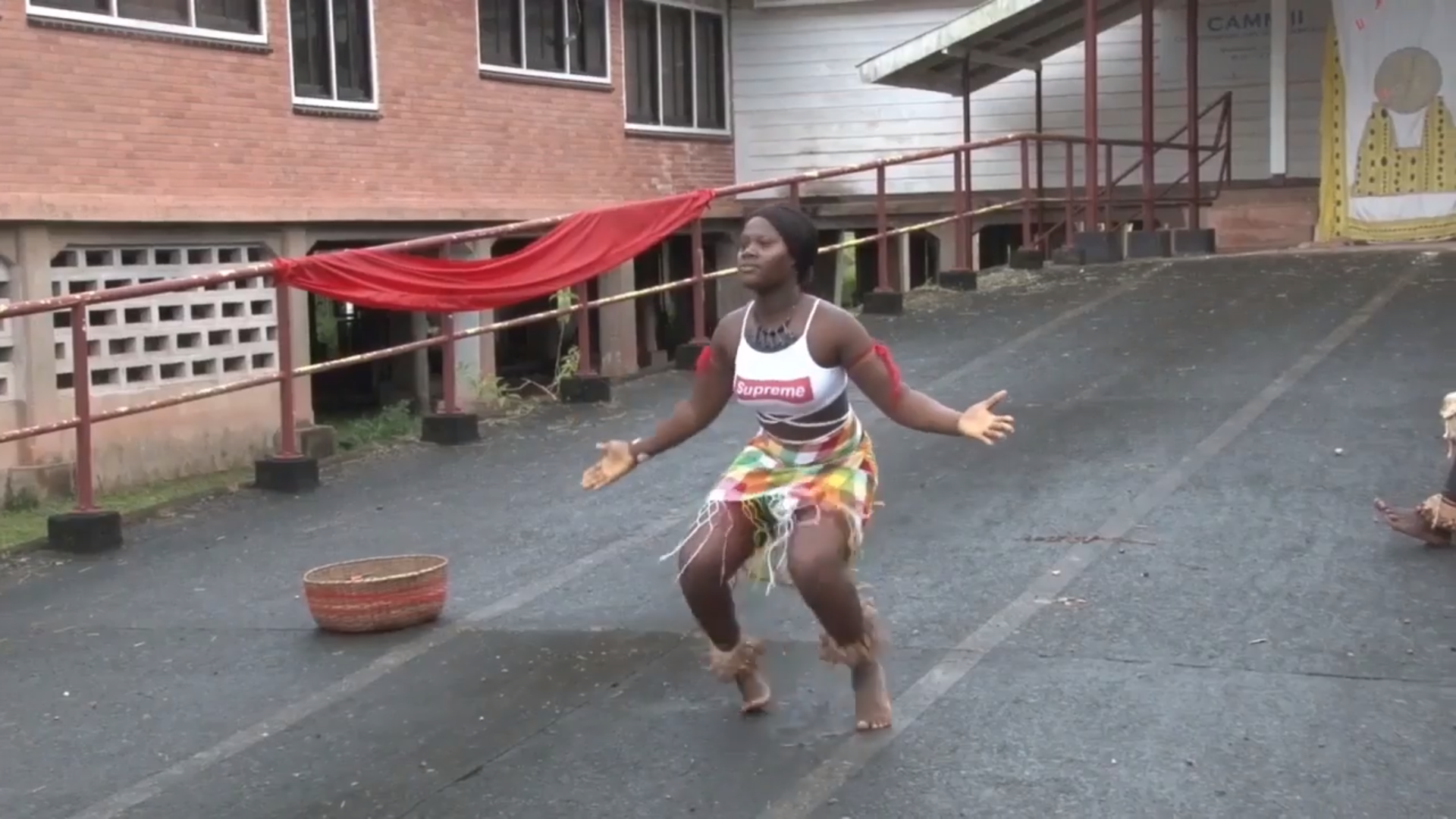

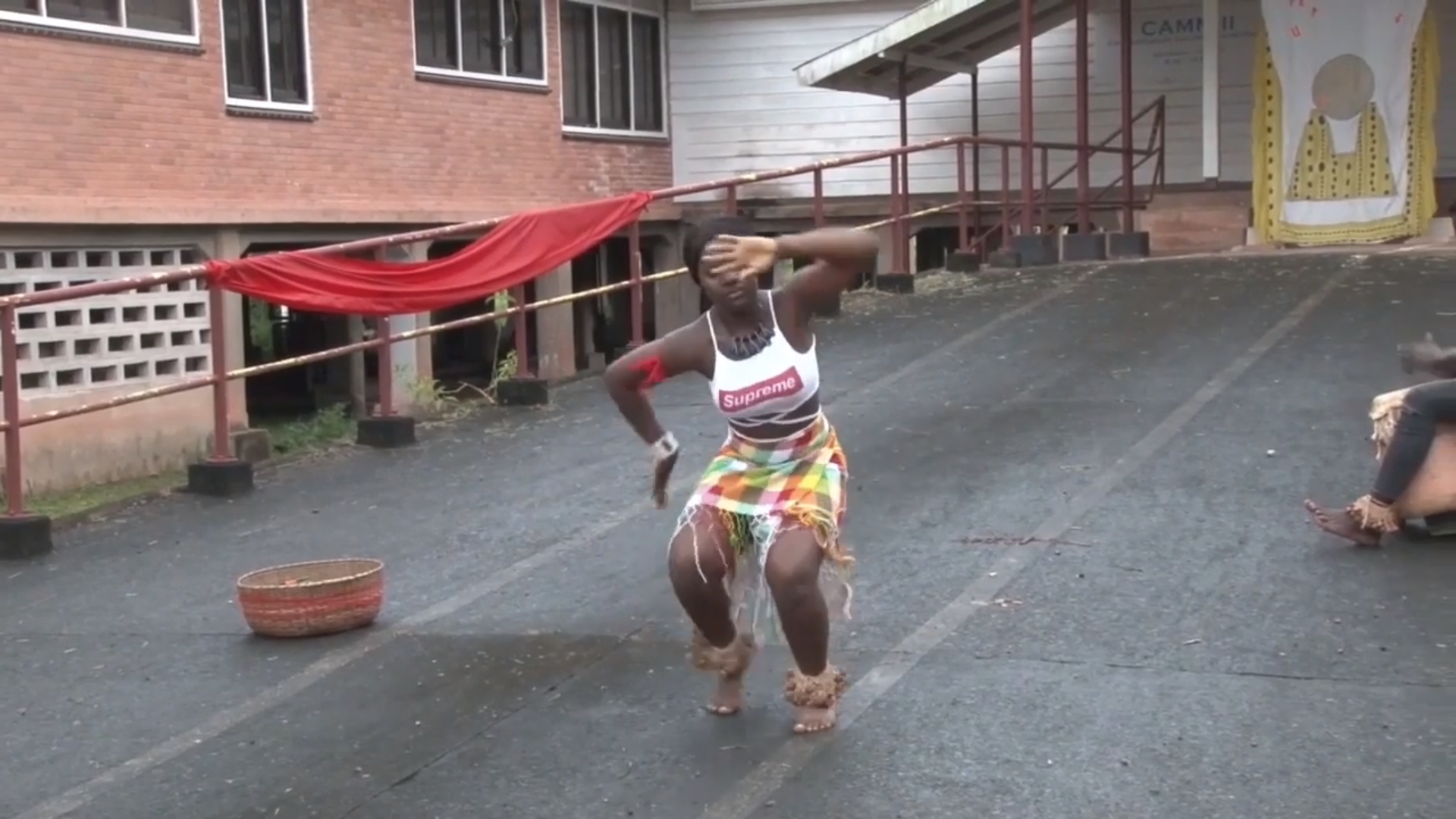

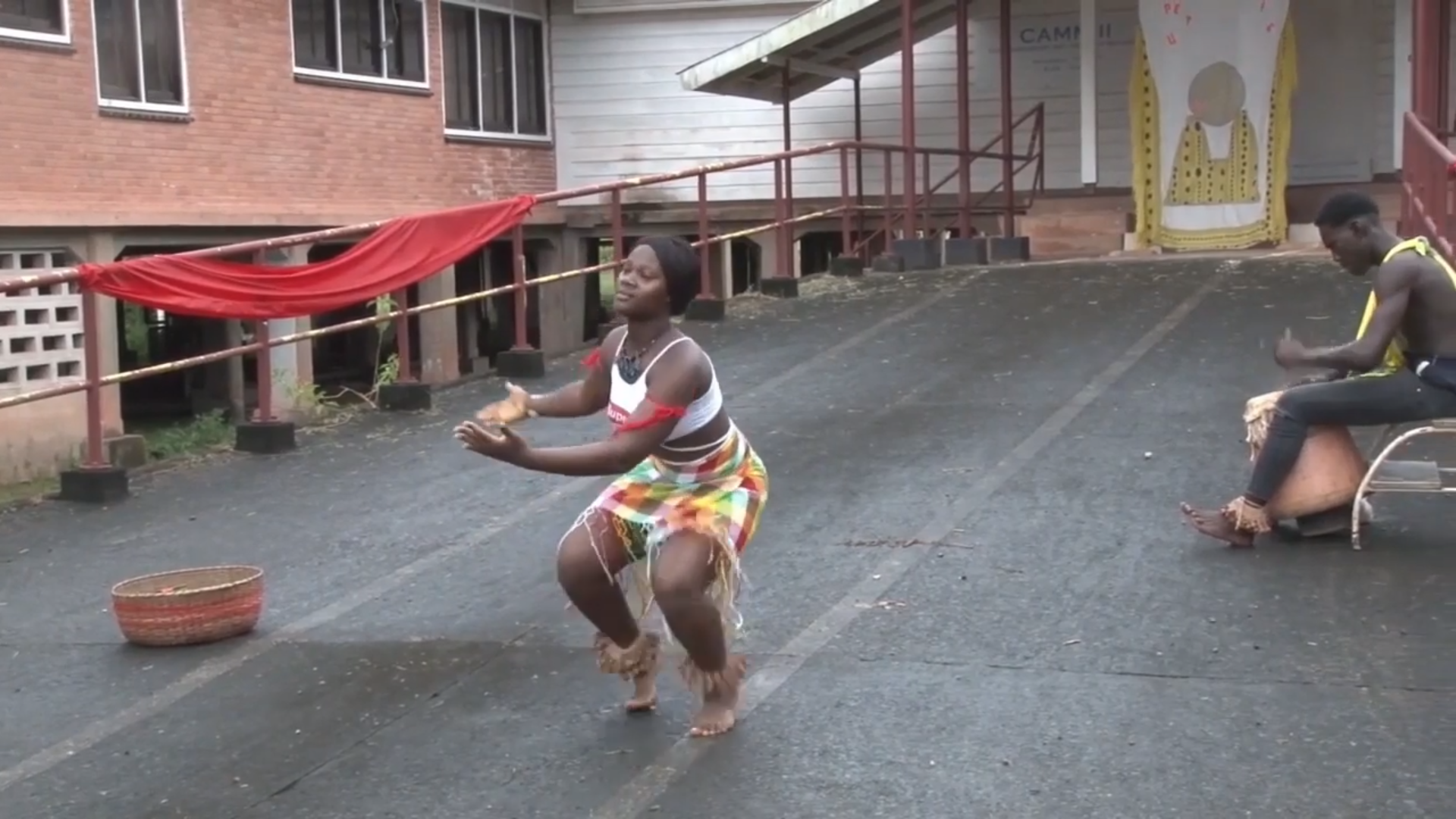

An individual performer in the Moengo Festival, 2019

== Dance companies ==
There have been several dance companies in Suriname promoting different styles. The following is an (incomplete) list.

- NAKS is a cultural association founded in the late 1940s. Over the course of its existence, the association has organized numerous initiatives, trainings and performances in the field of Afro-Surinamese dance.
- Cultureel Centrum Suriname (CCS; Cultural Centre Suriname) established Suriname's first ballet school in 1952. It has given ballet performances, also focusing on folkloric and local dances in the early 21st century.
- Nationaal Ballet Suriname (National Ballet Suriname) was in operation from 1978 to 1992. It performed with several ballet productions, and also its own Surinamese styles such as Ilse-Marie Hajary's dogla.
- Marlène's Ballet Company was founded by Marlène Lie A Ling in 1986 with the goal of doing more with the talents from her Marlène's Ballet School. The company has won international awards.
- Folkloristisch Ensemble Paramaribo (Folkloric Ensemble Paramaribo) was also founded in 1986 by Marlène Lie A Ling.
- The ArtLab Suriname (Art Laboratorium) is an artist collective. Several dance groups are affiliated with ArtLab, such as Turbo Squad and The Myztikalz.
