= Ketikoti =

Public holiday in Suriname commemorating the abolition of slavery (1 July 1863)

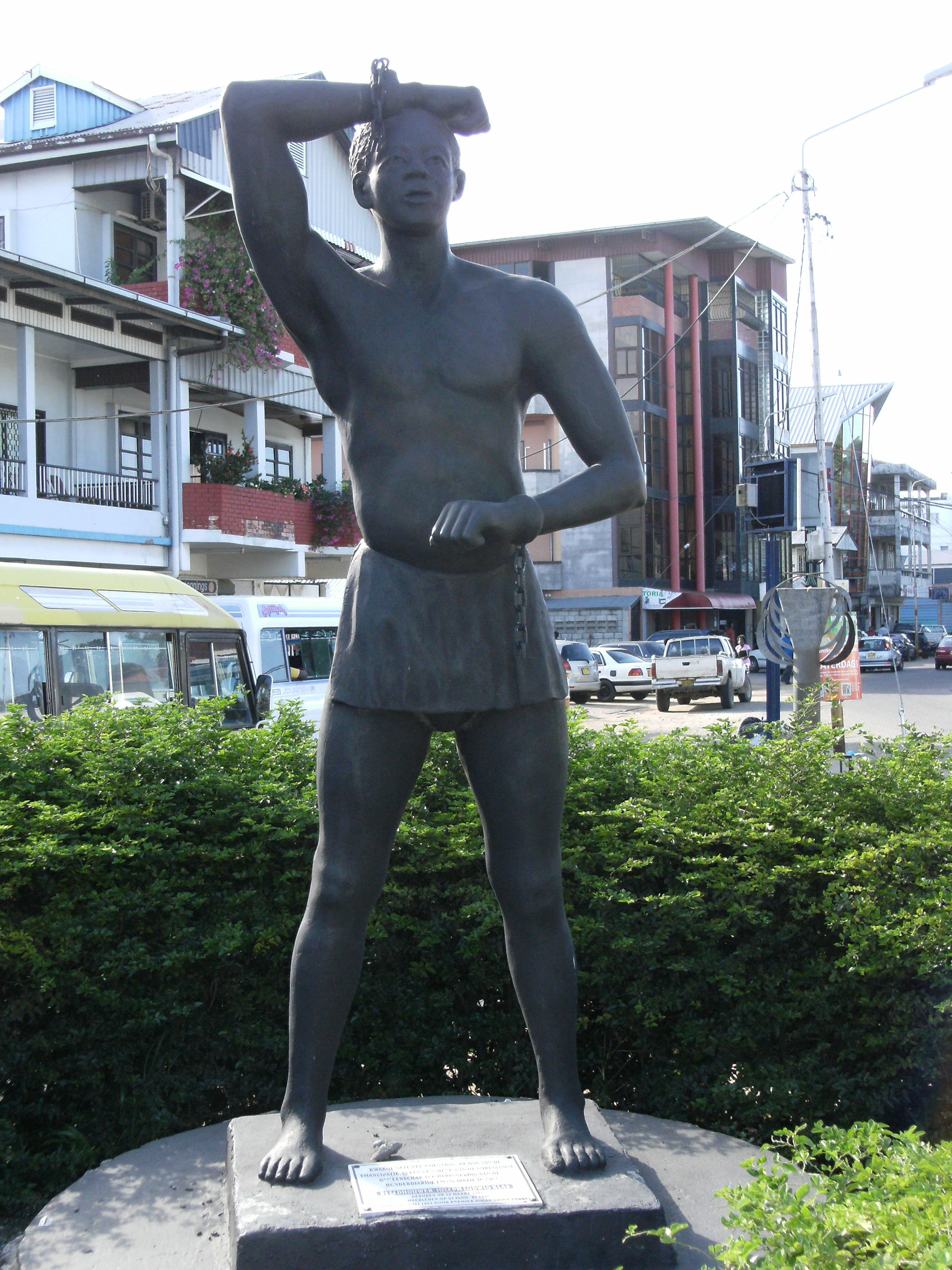
Kwakoe statue in Paramaribo, representing a freed slave whose chains have been cut

Ketikoti (IPA: [ˈkɪti ˈkɔti]), sometimes spelled as Keti Koti (Sranantongo: "the chain is cut" or "the chain is broken"), or officially Dag der Vrijheden (Dutch: Day of the Freedoms), is an annual celebration on 1 July that marks Emancipation Day in Suriname. The day is also known as Manspasi Dei or Prisiri Manspasi, meaning "Emancipation" or "Emancipation Festival", or Kettingsnijden (Dutch: chain cutting).

== History ==
Ketikoti marks the date when slavery was abolished in Surinam in 1863. However, enslaved people in Surinam would not be fully free until 1873, after a mandatory 10-year transition period during which time they were required to work on the plantations for minimal pay and with state-sanctioned force: if they were discovered outside without a pass, they could be jailed. On 1 July 1955, Ketikoti officially became a public holiday in Suriname. On 30 June 1963, the statue of Kwakoe was unveiled in Paramaribo, Suriname's capital city to commemorate the abolition of slavery.

After 1873 many slaves left the plantations where they had worked for several generations, in favor of the city of Paramaribo. Former slave owners were compensated. For the 32,911 released people that were kept as slaves in Suriname, an amount of ƒ 9,867,780.00 (in 2020 about €250 million) was paid to slave owners.

== Celebration ==
As of 2009, several cities in the Netherlands hosted various activities, making this a day of national celebration and remembrance throughout the country. Since 2002, there is an official monument for remembrance of slavery in the Kingdom of the Netherlands. This Nationaal Monument Slavernijgeschiedenis ("National Monument Slavery History") is in the Oosterpark in Amsterdam. The Keti Koti festival marks the date when slavery was abolished in Suriname and the Dutch Caribbean in 1863. The festival organisation also aims to pressure the Dutch government for reparations and research. As of 2020, it is still unclear when the first slaves arrived.
