= Karawasi =

The karawasi is a type of musical rattle consisting of seeds in a basket, similar to the maraca. The karawasi is played by the Indian tribes of Suriname, particularly the Kali`na coastal peoples.

== Sources ==
- Latin American Indian literatures journal. By Geneva College (Beaver Falls, Pa.). Dept. of Foreign Languages. Published by Dept. of Foreign Languages at Geneva College, 1989. v. 5-7, pg 37.
