= Pangi (Maroon) =

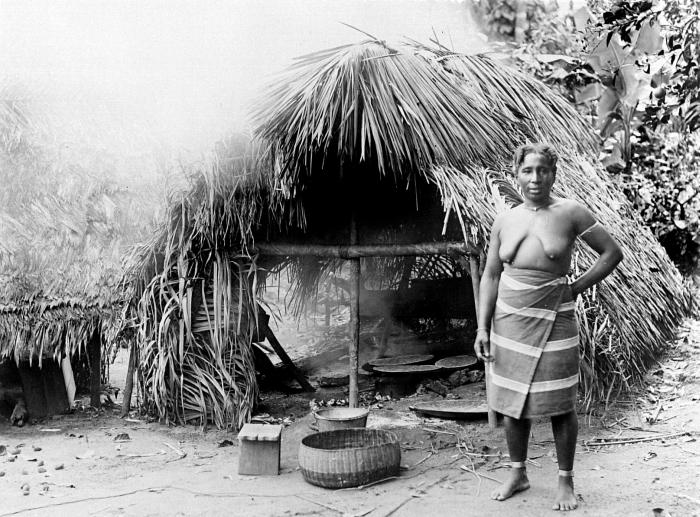
Maroon woman c. 1900-1910 wearing a pangi

Pangi is the name used by the Maroon people of Suriname for a type of cloth, and also for a wrap that may be made from this cloth.

Pangi cloth is a cotton fabric with multi-colored vertical and horizontal stripes, similar to West African kente cloth. It may be used by women for a wrap or a sling to carry a baby, by men for a breech cloth or shoulder cape and for other purposes such as making a hammock. In Suriname wrap skirts worn by women of all ethnic groups are called Pangi whether or not they are made of Pangi material.

The Suriname Maroons are the descendants of people who were brought from Africa as slaves after the mid-1600s and who escaped to live in the forests of the interior, eventually obtaining the right of self-government from the colonial powers. Traditionally the Maroons made their own clothing, using cotton as the raw material, which they either grew themselves or stole from plantation cotton fields. They most likely spun threads in the same way as the Amerindians, using a spindle at foot height, then wove the threads into cloth on a simple loom.

A woman would traditionally wear a panga but no top, and this is still customary in some villages. However, in villages that are frequented by tourists the women now generally wear a top. Originally pangis were made of plain material, but use of embroidery and appliqué became more common in the 1990s. Today, pangi wraps and bowls made of calabashes are the two main products manufactured for tourists in Upper Suriname. The maroons have learned that colorful and ornate pangis are the most popular with tourists.

== Sources ==
- Brouns, Rachelle (February 2011). "People in the beating heart of the Amazon" (PDF). Radboud university Nijmegen. Archived from the original (PDF) on 2012-01-17.
- Hoogbergen, Wim S. M. (1990). The Boni Maroon wars in Suriname. BRILL. ISBN 90-04-09303-6.
- "Obia Oso: An Ndjuka Maroon Shrine from Suriname". Yale Peabody Museum. Archived from the original on 2011-11-17.
- "The Maroon Community". Surinam Designz, Inc. Archived from the original on 2013-02-03.
