= Guiana Island =

Guiana Island may refer to:

- Guiana Island (Antigua and Barbuda), an island off the northeast coast of Antigua
- Guiana Island (South America), a region in northeastern South America

== See also ==
- Guyana (disambiguation)
- The Guianas
- Guana Island, an island in the British Virgin Islands
- Great Guana Cay, an islet in The Bahamas
