= Guinn =

Guinn is both a surname and a given name. Notable people with the name include:

Surname:

- Bill Guinn or Lew Meehan (1890–1951), American film actor
- Colin Guinn, contestant in The Amazing Race, a U.S. TV series
- Dick H. Guinn (1918–1980), vice admiral in the United States Navy
- Dominick Guinn, (born 1975), American professional boxer
- Ernest Allen Guinn (1905–1974), United States federal judge
- G. Earl Guinn (1912–2004), president of Louisiana Christian University
- Kenny Guinn (1936–2010), American businessman, educator and politician
- Nora Guinn (1920–2005), American judge
- R. T. Guinn (born 1981), American professional basketball player
- Robert Henry Guinn (1822–1887), Texas politician
- Skip Guinn (born 1944), former Major League Baseball pitcher
- Thomas Guinn (1836–1908), Union Army soldier during the American Civil War
- Tom Guinn (born 1944), Canadian sports shooter

Given name:

- Tiera Guinn Fletcher, American aerospace engineer
- Guinn Smith (1920–2004), American athlete, 1948 Olympic champion in the pole vault
- Guinn Williams (actor) (1899–1962), American actor who appeared in memorable westerns
- Guinn Williams (Texas politician) (1871–1948), U.S. Representative from Texas

== See also ==
- Guinn Hall, American residence hall at Texas Woman's University
- Guinn Run, Pennsylvania stream flowing southeastward in the Gettysburg National Military Park
- Guinn v. United States, 238 U.S. 347 (1915), U.S. Supreme Court decision on state constitutions that set qualifications for voters
- Guinan (disambiguation)
- Guinea (disambiguation)
- Guiney
- Gwynne (disambiguation)
