= Guinea (disambiguation) =

Guinea (Guinée, in French) or Guinea-Conakry is a republic in West Africa, independent since 1958.

Guinea may also refer to:

== Places ==
- Guinea (region), a region in West Africa
- Guinea-Bissau, a country in West Africa
- Equatorial Guinea, a country in western Africa
- Papua New Guinea, a country in Oceania
- Gulf of Guinea, a gulf of the Atlantic Ocean off the West African coast
- Guinea, Nova Scotia, Canada, a community
- Guinea, Virginia, United States, an unincorporated community in Caroline County
- Guinea, a region of Gloucester County, Virginia, United States
- Guinea, Álava, a hamlet in the Basque Country, Spain

== People ==
- Cristina Guinea (born 1992), Spanish field hockey midfielder
- Emilio Guinea (1907–1985), Spanish botanist
- "Guinea", an offensive term for someone of Italian descent
- "Guineas", a former term (now considered pejorative) for the Chestnut Ridge people of West Virginia

== Other uses ==
- Guinea (coin), a former British coin and currency unit
- Guinea (wasp), a wasp genus in the subfamily Pteromalinae

== See also ==
- Guinea baboon, Papio papio, a species of baboon
- Guineafowl, four genera of chicken-like birds in the family Numididae
- Guinea pig, a genus of rodents
- Guinea snout-burrower, a species of frog
- Guinea worm, parasitic worm native to parts of Africa
- Guinea Creole (disambiguation)
- Guinea company (disambiguation)
- Areas in South America with similar spellings:
  - French Guiana, an overseas department of France
  - Guyana, a country
  - The Guianas, a region
- Guinia (disambiguation)
- Guyana (disambiguation)
