= List of Motown artists =

This is a list of artists signed to Motown or one of its many subsidiaries.

Overview of Motown acts
Name	Signed	Label	Notes
98 Degrees	1990s	Motown	
702	1990s	Motown	
7669	1990s	Motown	
Akon	21st century	Motown	
The Allens	1970s	Motown	
Georgio Allentini	1980s/1990s	Motown	
Luther Allison	1970s	Motown	
Gerald Alston	1990s	Motown	
The Andantes	1960s	Motown Records	Backing vocal group used on several recordings
Another Bad Creation	1980s/1990s	Biv 10 Records	
Apollo	1970s	Motown	
India Arie	21st century	Motown	
Ashanti	21st century	Motown	
Ashford & Simpson	1960s	Motown	The duo worked at Motown as songwriters and producers primarily, but Valerie Simpson recorded albums with the label and the duo recorded albums as an act at other labels
Cholly Atkins	1960s	Motown	Choreographer
Avery	21st century	Motown	
AZ	21st century	Motown	
B.G.O.T.I.	1980s/1990s	BGOTI	
Babyface	21st century	Motown	
Erykah Badu	1990s/2000s	Motown	
Bankroll Freddie	21st century	Motown	
J. J. Barnes	1960s	Ric-Tic Records	
Drake Bell	21st century	Motown	
Yummy Bingham	21st century	Motown	
Will Biondo	21st century	Motown	
Black Coffey	21st century	Motown	
Blinky	1960s	Motown	
Bobby M	1980s/1990s	Gordy	
Bobby Taylor & the Vancouvers	1960s	Gordy	
The Boys	1980s/1990s	Motown	
Boyz II Men	1990s/2000s	Motown	
Brandy	2020s	Motown	
Brass Monkey	1970s	Rare Earth	
Toni Braxton	21st century	Motown	
Brik Citi	1990s	Motown	
Trina Broussard	21st century	Motown	
Dorsey Burnette	1960s	Mel-o-dy Records	
Jerry Butler	1970s	Motown	
G. C. Cameron	1970s	Motown	
The Cats	1970s	Rare Earth	
Vita Chambers	21st century	Motown	
Charlene	1980s/1990s	Motown	
Choker Campbell & His 16-Piece Band	1960s	Motown Records	
City Girls	21st century	Motown	
Chris Clark	1960s	V. I. P. Records	
Tom Clay	1970s	MoWest Records	
Angela Clemmons	1980s/1990s	Motown	
Desiree Coleman	1980s/1990s	Motown	
Commodores	1970s	MoWest and Motown	
The Contours	1960s	Gordy Records	
Caroline Crawford	1960s	Motown	
Crystal Mansion	1970s	Rare Earth	
Bobby Darin	1970s	Motown	
Dazz Band	1980s/1990s	Motown	
Dean Debbie	1960s	Motown	
DeBarge	1980s	Gordy	
Bunny DeBarge	1980s	Motown	
Chico DeBarge	1980s	Motown	
El DeBarge	1980s	Gordy	
Kiki Dee	1970s	Tamla	
Donnie	21st century	Motown	
The Dynamic Superiors	1970s	Motown	
Earl Van Dyke and the Soul Brothers	1960s	Motown	
The Easybeats	1970s	Rare Earth	
Billy Eckstine	1960s	Motown	
Duane Eddy	1970s	Motown	
Dennis Edwards	1970s	Gordy	
The Elgins	1960s	V. I. P.	
The Fantastic Four	1960s	Ric-Tic and Soul Records	
Jose Feliciano	1980s	Motown	
Four Tops	1960s-1972; 1980s	Motown	
Frankie Valli & The Four Seasons	1970s	MoWest and Motown	
Siedah Garrett	1980s/1990s	Gordy	
Marvin Gaye	1960s/1970s	Tamla	
Valerie George	1980s/1990s	Gordy	
Nikita Germaine	1980s/1990s	Motown	
Johnny Gill	1990s/2000s	Motown	
Gladys Knight & the Pips	1960s	Soul Records	
The Good Girls	1980s/1990s	Motown	
Layton Greene	21st century	Motown	
Guinn	1980s/1990s	Motown	
Sam Harris	1980s/1990s	Motown	
Hearts of Stone	1970s	V. I. P.	
High Inergy	1970s	Gordy	
Eddie Holland	1960s	Motown	
Dave Hollister	21st century	Motown	
Brenda Holloway	1960s	Tamla	
Patrice Holloway	1960s	V. I. P.	
Thelma Houston	1970s	Tamla	
Reuben Howell	1970s	Motown	
Howl the Good	1970s	Rare Earth	
Willie Hutch	1970s/1980s	Motown	
Impact of Brass	1970s	Rare Earth	
The Isley Brothers	1960s	Tamla	
Mila J	21st century	Motown	
Chuck Jackson	1960s/1970s	Motown/V. I. P.	
Jackie Jackson	1970s	Motown	
Jermaine Jackson	1970s	Motown	Remained with Motown after his brothers departed from the label in 1976, with Jermaine eventually leaving Motown in 1983
Michael Jackson	1970s	Motown	
The Jackson 5	1969/1970s	Motown	Also billed as the Jackson Five or the Jackson 5ive
Jada	21st century	Motown	
Rick James	1970s	Gordy	
Mable John	1960s	Tamla	
Marv Johnson	1960s	Tamla	
Wade Jones	1959	Rayber	
Jords	2020s	Motown	First British rap act signed to Motown.
Jr. Walker & the All Stars	1960s/1970s	Soul	
Keff James	1970s	Rare Earth	
Kem	21st century	Motown	
Eddie Kendricks	1970s	Tamla	
Sebastian Kole	21st century	Motown	
Kreuz	1980s/1990s	Motown	
LADAE	1990s	Motown	
Lakeyah	21st century	Motown	
Latif	21st century	Motown	
Stacy Lattisaw	1980s/1990s	Motown	
Bettye LaVette	1980s/1990s	Motown	
Lil Baby	21st century	Motown	
Lil Durk	21st century	Motown	The Voice of the Heroes with Lil Baby
Lil Yachty	21st century	Motown	
Lindsay Lohan	21st century	Motown	Only the single "Bossy")
London	21st century	Motown	
Lost Boyz	1980s/1990s	Motown	
The Lost Nation	1970s	Rare Earth	
Love Sculpture	1970s	Rare Earth	
Lovesmith	1960s		
Michael Lovesmith	1960s		
Shorty Long	1960s	Soul	
Magic	1970s	Rare Earth	
Teena Marie	1970s	Gordy	
Martha and the Vandellas	1960s	Gordy	Also billed as Martha Reeves and the Vandellas
The Marvelettes	1960s	Tamla	
Mary Jane Girls	1980s/1990s	Gordy	
Matrix	1970s	Rare Earth	
MC Brains	1990s	Biv 10 Records	
MC Trouble	1980s/1990s	Motown	
Michael McDonald	1980s/1990s	Motown	
Carrie McDowell	1980s/1990s	Motown	
Brian McKnight	1990s/2000s	Motown	
Barbara McNair	1960s	Motown	
Meechy Baby	21st century	Motown	
Michael and the Messengers	1970s	Rare Earth	
Chrisette Michele	21st century	Motown	
Migos	21st century	Motown	
The Miracles	1960s/1970s	Tamla	Also billed as Smokey Robinson & the Miracles
Misa	1980s/1990s	Motown	
The Monitors	1960s	V. I. P. Records	
Debelah Morgan	1980s/1990s	Motown	
Mýa	21st century	Motown	
Nelly	21st century	Motown	
Frances Nero	1960s	Motown	
Ne-Yo	21st century	Motown	
Njomza	21st century	Motown	
The Originals	1960s/1970s	Soul	
The Ones	1960s	Motown	
Matt Ox	21st century	Motown	
Pal	1980s/1990s	Motown	
Bonnie Pointer	1970s	Motown	
The Pointer Sisters	1980s/1990s	Motown	
Poor Boys	1970s	Rare Earth	
Power of Zeus	1970s	Rare Earth	
Billy Preston	1970s/1980s	Motown	
The Pretty Things	1970s	Rare Earth	
Profyle	1990s/2000s	Motown	
Quavo	21st century	Motown	
Queen Latifah	1980s	Motown	
Barbara Randolph	1960s	Soul	
Dina Rae	21st century	Motown	
Rare Earth	1970s	Rare Earth	
The Rayber Voices	1959	Rayber	A backing vocal group: Robert Bateman; Brian Holland; William "Sonny" Sanders
La'Porsha Renae	21st century	Motown	
Repairs	1970s	Rare Earth	
Lionel Richie	1980s	Motown	
Jimmy Robbins	21st century	Motown	
Smokey Robinson	1970s	Tamla	
Rockwell	1980s	Motown	
Diana Ross	1970s	Motown	
Kevin Ross	21st century	Motown	
Kelly Rowland	21st century	Motown	
Bailey Rubero	21st century	Motown	
David Ruffin	1960s/1970s	Motown	
Jimmy Ruffin	1960s	Soul	
Rustix	1970s	Rare Earth	
SafetySuit	21st century	Motown	
Phyllis St. James	1980s/1990s	Motown	
Tiwa Savage	21st century	Motown	
San Remo Golden Strings	1960s	Gordy	
Shades	1990s	Motown	
Remy Shand	21st century	Motown	
Shanice	1990s	Motown	
Sharissa	21st century	Motown	
Shiny Toy Guns	21st century	Motown	
Shontelle	21st century	Motown	
Valerie Simpson	1970s	Tamla	
Sounds Nice	1970s	Rare Earth	
Sparkle	21st century	Motown	
The Spinners	1960s/early 1970s	Motown/V. I. P.	Also marketed as The (Original) Detroit Spinners in the United Kingdom to distinguish them from the British folk act
Vince Staples	21st century	Motown	
Edwin Starr	1960s	Soul	
Rose Stone	1970s	Motown	Also known as Rose Banks
Stone City Band	1980s/1990s	Gordy	
Dennis Stoner	1970s	Rare Earth	
Stoney & Meatloaf	1970s	Rare Earth	
Barrett Strong	1959	Tamla	
Suai	21st century	Motown	
Subway	1990s	Biv 10 Records	
Sunday Funnies	1970s	Rare Earth	
The Supremes	1960s	Motown	Also billed as Diana Ross & the Supremes
Switch	1970s	Gordy	
Takeoff	21st century	Motown	
Felicia Taylor	1980s/1990s	Motown	
R. Dean Taylor	1960s	V. I. P.	
The Temptations	1960s	Gordy	
Three Ounces of Love	1960s	Motown	
Tammi Terrell	1960s	Gordy	
Leon Thomas III	2020s	Motown/EZMNY	
Toe Fat	1970s	Rare Earth	
Today	1980s/1990s	Motown	
Tony! Toni! Toné!	1980s/1990s	Motown	
Trick Trick	21st century	Motown	
UFO	1970s	Rare Earth	
The Underdogs	1960s	V. I. P.	
The Undisputed Truth	1970s	Gordy	
UnoTheActivist	21st century	Motown	
The Valadiers	1960s	Miracle	
Vanity	1980s/1990s	Motown	
The Veer Union	21st century	Motown	
Táta Vega	1970s	Tamla	
The Velvelettes	1960s	V. I. P.	
Waii	21st century	Motown	
Leon Ware	1970s	Motown	
Jason Weaver	1980s/1990s	Motown	
Mary Wells	1960s	Motown	
Kim Weston	1960s	Gordy	
The Whitehead Brothers	1990s	Motown	
Bruce Willis	1980s	Motown	
Mary Wilson	1970s	Motown	
Wolfe	1970s	Rare Earth	
Stevie Wonder	1960s	Tamla/Motown	Originally billed as Little Stevie Wonder
Syreeta Wright	1960s/1970s/early/1980s	Motown/MoWest	Also billed as Rita Wright and Syreeta
XIT	1970s	Rare Earth	
Val Young	1980s/1990s	Gordy	
The Velvelettes	1960s	V. I. P.	
YoungBoy Never Broke Again	21st century	Motown	
Yours Truly	1980s/1990s	Motown	
P Yungin	21st century	Motown	
Zhané	1990s	Illtown/Motown Records	
Zion	21st century	Motown	

== Sources cited ==
- Dahl, Bill (February 28, 2011). Motown: The Golden Years: More Than 100 Rare Photographs. Penguin Publishing Group. ISBN 9781440225574.
- Waller, Don (1985). The Motown Story. New York City, New York, United States: Charles Scribner's Sons. ISBN 0684183471. LCCN 85002110.
