= Guiney =

Guiney (/ˈɡaɪni/) is an Irish surname is mainly found in Cork and Kerry, also in the forms 'Guinee' and 'Geaney'. The name 'MacGuiney', a variant of 'MacGeaney', is found in County Cavan.

Notable people with the surname include:

- Ben Guiney, American baseball player
- Bob Guiney, star of the fourth season of The Bachelor
- Louise Imogen Guiney, American poet
- Mary Guiney, chairperson of the Clerys department store group
- Patrick Guiney, Irish Nationalist politician
- Patrick Robert Guiney, American Civil War soldier
- Rod Guiney, Irish sportsperson

== See also ==
- Guineys, a department store in Ireland
