= Eddie Holland (album) =

Studio album by Eddie Holland
- Released: May 1962
- Genre: Rhythm and blues
- Length: 24:47
- Language: English
- Label: Motown
- Producer: Eddie Holland; William "Mickey" Stevenson

Eddie Holland is the sole studio album by American rhythm and blues songwriter Eddie Holland, released on Motown in 1962.

== Recording and release ==
After releasing a string of singles and writing many hit singles for the label, Holland was given the chance to record an album. His single "Jamie"—which was included on this album after its single release—was the first hit for Motown other than Mary Wells' seven charting singles; that song reached sixth on the Billboard R&B charts and thirtieth on the pop charts in October 1961. In spite of suffering from stage fright, Holland went on tour to promote the album, backed by The Temptations, but this release was not a hit. He mostly returned to songwriting, where he co-authored a majority of the label's hit songs through 1967 with his songwriting combo Holland–Dozier–Holland and released two more minor hit singles in 1964, before retiring from recording.

== Reception ==
Billboard followed the success of "Jamie" prior to this album release and projected strong sales potential for the follow-up "If Cleopatra Took a Chance", calling the single "a dramatic, Jackie Wilson-styled performance". The publication also recommended the final single, "If It's Love (It's Alright)", to retailers as having moderate sales potential. Neither song charted domestically, but the latter reached 50 on Cash Box's R&B singles. Editors at AllMusic Guide scored this album 2.5 out of five stars, with critic Andrew Hamilton also noting Holland's vocal style and its similarities to Jackie Wilson and complaining that "most of the material sounds dated, even for 1962".

== Track listing ==
1. "Jamie" (William "Mickey" Stevenson and Barrett Strong) – 2:22
2. "True Love Will Go a Mighty Long Way" (Eddie Holland and Stevenson) – 2:09
3. "If It's Love (It's Alright)" (Brian Holland and Stevenson) – 2:21
4. "What About Me" (Stevenson and Strong) – 2:37
5. "It's Not Too Late" (Stevenson) – 2:28
6. "If Cleopatra Took a Chance" (Stevenson) – 2:31
7. "Take a Chance On Me" (Robert Bateman, Freddie Gorman, and E. Holland) – 2:34
8. "Last Night I Had a Vision" (Stevenson and Strong) – 2:54
9. "A Little Bit of Lovin'" (Lamont Dozier and E. Holland) – 2:34
10. "Gotta Have Your Love" (E. Holland) – 2:30

== Personnel ==
- Eddie Holland – vocals, production
- Barney Ales – liner notes
- The Andantes – backing vocals
  - Marlene Barrow
  - Louvain Demps
  - Jackie Hicks
- The Rayber Voices – backing vocals
  - Robert Bateman
  - Brian Holland
  - William "Sonny" Sanders
- William "Mickey" Stevenson – production
- Barni Wright – cover design

== See also ==
- List of 1962 albums
