= Guayanés River =

Guayanés River may refer to:

- Guayanés River (Peñuelas, Puerto Rico)
- Guayanés River (Yabucoa, Puerto Rico)

== See also ==
- Guyana (disambiguation)
