= Guiana Island (South America) =

Island or Region in South America

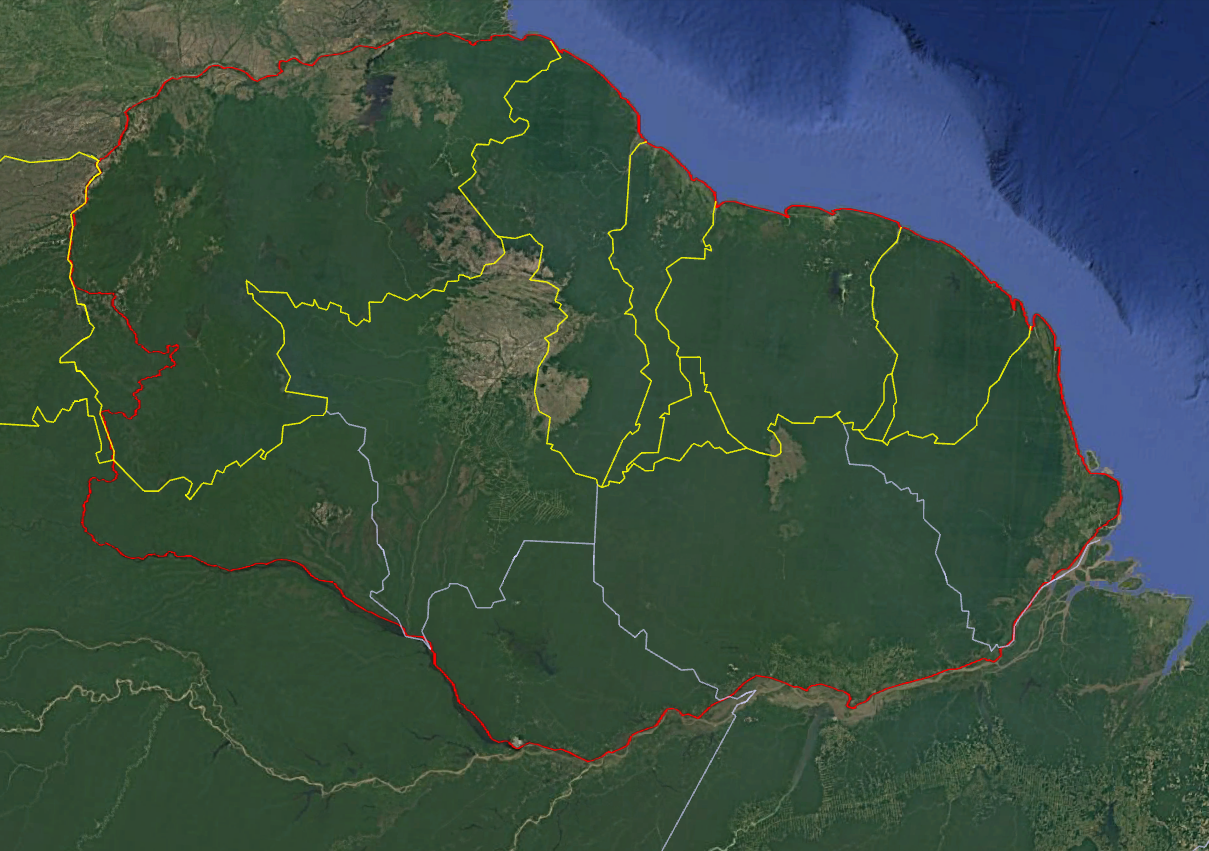
- Guiana Island

Geography
- Location: South America
- Coordinates: 5°08′36″N 60°45′45″W
- Area: 1,700,000 km^{2} (660,000 sq mi)
- Area rank: 2nd
- Highest elevation: 2,995 m (9826 ft)
- Highest point: Pico da Neblina

Administration
- Guyana
- Capital and largest city: Georgetown (pop. 125,683)
- Suriname
- Capital and largest city: Paramaribo (pop. 223,757)
- French Guiana
- Capital and largest city: Cayenne (pop. 63,956)
- Venezuela
- States: Amazonas; Bolívar; Delta Amacuro
- Largest city: Ciudad Guayana (pop. 978,202)
- Brazil
- States: Amapá; Roraima; Pará; Amazonas
- Largest city: Manaus (pop. 2,063,689)

Demographics
- Population: c. 8 million (2022)
- Languages: Portuguese; Spanish; Dutch; French; English; Arawakan languages; Cariban languages; Tupi–Guarani languages

Guiana Island (Brazilian Portuguese: Ilha das Guianas or Ilha da Guiana) is a region located in the northeastern portion of South America, comprising a vast landmass encircled by both seawater and rivers.

== Geography ==
Guiana Island exhibits a distinctive geographical configuration. A fluvial capture event has resulted in a natural bifurcation of the upper Orinoco, known as the Casiquiare canal. This river diverts part of the Orinoco's flow into the Rio Negro, a major tributary of the Amazon River. As a result, the landmass encompassing the Brazilian states of Amapá and Roraima, much of Amazonas and Pará, eastern Venezuela (east of the Orinoco), and the entirety of Guyana, Suriname, and French Guiana constitutes a singular fluvial-maritime island.

=== Geology ===
Geologically, the perimeter largely coincides with the extent of the Guiana Shield, one of the three cratonic formations of the South American Plate. However, it excludes the shield's western portion, known as the Vaupés Arch (or Vaupés Swell), which lies outside the fluvial boundaries. Conversely, the island's southern limit incorporates not the shield itself but the adjacent Amazonian Sedimentary Basin—a massive downwarp filled with Cenozoic sediments, often referred to as the Amazon Lowlands. This low-lying plain is drained by the Amazon River and its tributaries, whose courses form the southern hydrological boundary of the island.

=== Continental Connections and Isolation ===
Paradoxically, the rivers that define the region act more as connectors—vital highways for transportation and settlement—while the true insulator has been the sheer scale and density of the surrounding rainforest. This immense forest has historically impeded overland travel and infrastructure development, making river and air transport the lifeblood of the region. Nevertheless, modern engineering has created fixed terrestrial links that pierce this isolation. The first bridge to connect the landmass to the rest of the continent was the Angostura Bridge over the Orinoco River at Ciudad Bolívar, Venezuela, completed in 1967. This was later supplemented by the Orinoquia Bridge (2006) and the forthcoming Puente Mercosur. A more recent and critical connection is Brazil's Rio Negro Bridge, inaugurated in 2011, which spans the Rio Negro from Manaus to the southern bank, providing a direct road link to the continuous highway network of continental South America. Despite these crossings, vast areas remain profoundly isolated by land, and the absence of any bridge across the main channel of the Amazon River itself means the northern regions are still best accessed by water or air.

== See also ==
- The Guianas
