= Mangra =

Mangra Township 茫拉乡 · མང་ར་ཞང་། Mangla
- Township
- Location in Qinghai
- Coordinates: 35°39′N 100°36′E
- Country: China
- Province: Qinghai
- Autonomous prefecture: Hainan
- County: Guinan

Area
  - Total: 428.79 km^{2} (165.56 sq mi)

Population (2011)
  - Total: 6,867
  - Density: 16.01/km^{2} (41.48/sq mi)
- Time zone: UTC+8 (China Standard)

Mangra (Tibetan: མང་ར་ཞང་།, Chinese: 茫拉乡) is a township in Guinan County, Hainan Tibetan Autonomous Prefecture, Qinghai Province, China.
