= Guinan =

Guinan may refer to:

- Guinan County, Qinghai, China
- Guinan dialect, of Yue Chinese
- Guinan (Star Trek), fictional character of Star Trek science fiction franchise

== People with the given name ==
- Guinan Khairy (1903–1938), Bashkir poet, writer and playwright

== People with the surname ==
- J. Edward Guinan, American community activist, founder of the Community for Creative Non-Violence
- Edward Guinan, American professor of astronomy and astrophysics
- Francis Guinan, American actor
- Francisco González Guinán (1841–1932), Venezuelan politician, journalist, lawyer, and historian
- Larry Guinan (born 1938), Irish hurler
- Mary Guinan, American virologist
- Matthew Guinan (1910–1995), American labor organizer
- Robert Guinan (1934–2016), Chicago-based American painter
- Steve Guinan (born 1975), English footballer
- Texas Guinan (1884–1933), American actress, producer and entrepreneur
