= Senduo Township, Qinghai =

Senduo Township 森多乡
- Township
- Senduoxiang
- Location in Qinghai
- Coordinates: 35°31′10″N 100°55′35″E
- Country: People's Republic of China
- Province: Qinghai
- Autonomous prefecture: Hainan Tibetan Autonomous Prefecture
- County: Guinan County

Area
  - Total: 1,537 km^{2} (593 sq mi)

Population (2010)
  - Total: 14,346
  - Density: 9.334/km^{2} (24.17/sq mi)
- Time zone: UTC+8 (China Standard)
- Local dialing code: 974

Senduo Township (Chinese: 森多乡) is a township in Guinan County, Hainan Tibetan Autonomous Prefecture, Qinghai, China. In 2010, Senduo Township had a total population of 14,346 people: 7,347 males and 6,999 females: 4,272 under 14 years old, 9,245 aged between 15 and 64 and 829 over 65 years old.
