= Guyana (disambiguation) =

Guyana is a country in the Guianas, South America.

Guyana, Guiana, or Guayana may refer to:

- British Guiana, a British colony until 1966, now independent and known as Guyana
- French Guiana, an overseas department of France in the Guianas
- The Guianas, a region in the north of South America
- Guayana Esequiba, a Venezuelan territorial claim
- Guayana Province, a province of Spanish Colonial Venezuela and independent Venezuela 1585−1864
- Guayana Region, an administrative region of Venezuela
- Ciudad Guayana, a city in Bolívar State, Venezuela
- Guayana language or Wayaná, an extinct Jê language of southern Brazil
- Guayana or Wayana language, a Caribbean language spoken in Suriname, French Guiana, and Brazil
- Guiana Island, Antigua and Barbuda
- Guiana Island, region in South America encircled by seawater and rivers
- Guyana (1966–1970), a predecessor to the current country Guyana
- Guiana Highlands, a mountainous area in the Guianas
- Guiana Shield, a geological craton of precambrian crust

== See also ==
- Guyenne
- Guinea (disambiguation)
- Wayana people
- Brazilian Guiana
