= Guinea Creole =

Guinea Creole can refer to:

- Upper Guinea Creoles (disambiguation) — Group of Creoles that include Guinea-Bissau Creole and Cape Verdean Creole
- Guinea-Bissau Creole — Creole spoken in Guinea-Bissau
