= Brazilian Guiana =

Brazilian Guiana may refer to:

- Amapá, a Brazilian state
- Guiana Brasileira (meme), a meme involving Brazil and Portugal

== See also ==
- Guyana (disambiguation)
- The Guianas
