= Clerys =

Former department store and related shops in Dublin, Ireland

Coordinates: 53.34917°N 6.25966°W

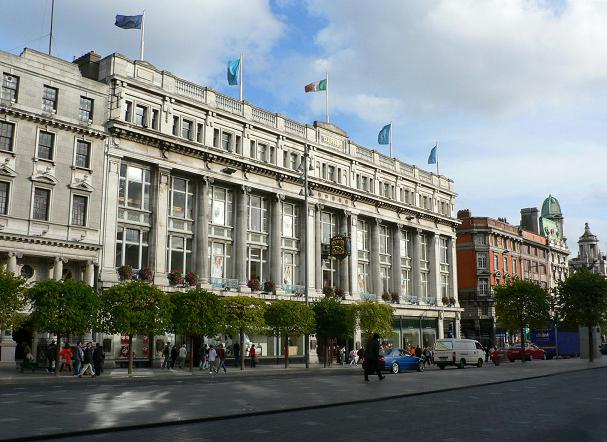
- Type: Private company
- Industry: Retail
- Genre: Department Store
- Founded: May 1853
- Founder: Michael J. Clery
- Defunct: 12 June 2015
- Headquarters: Dublin, Ireland
- Key people: Dominic Prendergast; Simon Smith
- Products: Quality & luxury goods
- Revenue: €21.9 million (2011)
- Owner: Core Capital
- Number of employees: 350
- Parent: Clerys
- Website: www.clerys.com; Official website (archived from 19 December 2014)
- Footnotes http://www.clerys.com is the website for the Clerys building, but no longer Clerys as a store itself.

Clerys was a long-established department store on O'Connell Street in Dublin, Ireland, a focal point of the street.

The business dates from 1853, however the current building dates from 1922, the original having been completely destroyed in the 1916 Easter Rising. Clerys completed a five-year restoration programme in 2004 at a cost of €24 million but went into receivership in 2012, and was sold. Under American ownership, it abruptly closed in 2015, and issues arose with staff and franchise holders over an extended period afterwards.

As of 2024, a renovation project has been underway for some years, converting the layout from that of a department store to that of various businesses operating under the same roof, including a hotel and multiple eating places. The launch of the new Clerys Quarter, as it is called, has been delayed multiple times, from autumn 2022, then spring 2023, autumn 2023 and Christmas 2023. Clerys Quarter opened on the 15. of March 2024.

The Clerys commercial group eventually also included three "At Home With Clerys" homewares stores in out-of-town retail parks at Blanchardstown, Leopardstown and Naas; and a more economic department store Guiney and Co. on Talbot Street, (a different company to the Michael Guineys chain) at 79-80 Talbot Street; all of which closed during the 2012 receivership. There had formerly been a fashion-only outlet in The Square, Tallaght but this had already closed by the time of the 2012 receivership.

== Ownership ==
The history of Clerys began in May 1853 when Mac Swiney, Delany and Co. opened ‘The New or Palatial Mart' on the site of the present store in what was then Sackville Street. In 1883, the premises was taken over and renamed by M. J. Clery (died 1896), a native of Bulgaden, County Limerick. William Martin Murphy was also involved in the business.

Clerys was bought out of receivership in 1941 by Denis Guiney (1893–1967) for £250,000. The receivers were Craig Gardner & Co. Denis Guiney died in 1967, and his widow Mary Guiney (née Mary Leahy) continued to be chairperson until her death on 23 August 2004 at the age of 103 years.

== Second receivership and Gordon Brothers ==
Clerys was bought out by Gordon Brothers, and split into a property-holding and an operating company, after being placed in receivership on 17 September 2012; joint receivers Paul McCann and Michael McAteer of Grant Thornton said the store’s future could be secured, and it did indeed operate for several years after this.

== Closure ==
Kieran Wallace and Eamonn Richardson were appointed joint provisional liquidators to OSC Operations Limited (the "Company") trading as Clerys, on 12 June 2015. The company ceased to trade with immediate effect.

Staff were given 30 minutes' notice to pack up and leave, some having worked there for over 40 years. The Clerys operating business was sold for €1, but the building, which was in a property holding company, was sold for €29 million to the Natrium Investment Group. Disputes with staff and franchise operators continued for several years. Paddy McKillen's Oakmount and Europa Capital coming on board to redevelop the site, and with architects Henry J Lyons trying to keep as much of the original design (based on Selfridges' in London) as possible.

== Clerys Clock ==
A large clock with two faces hangs above Clerys' central doors on O'Connell Street (opposite the statue of Jim Larkin). "Under Clerys' clock" is a well-known rendez-vous, both for Dubliners, and visitors from the countryside, and is famous in the city's culture as a place where many romances begin. 1990, on the fiftieth anniversary of Denis Guiney taking over the store, a new clock was installed.

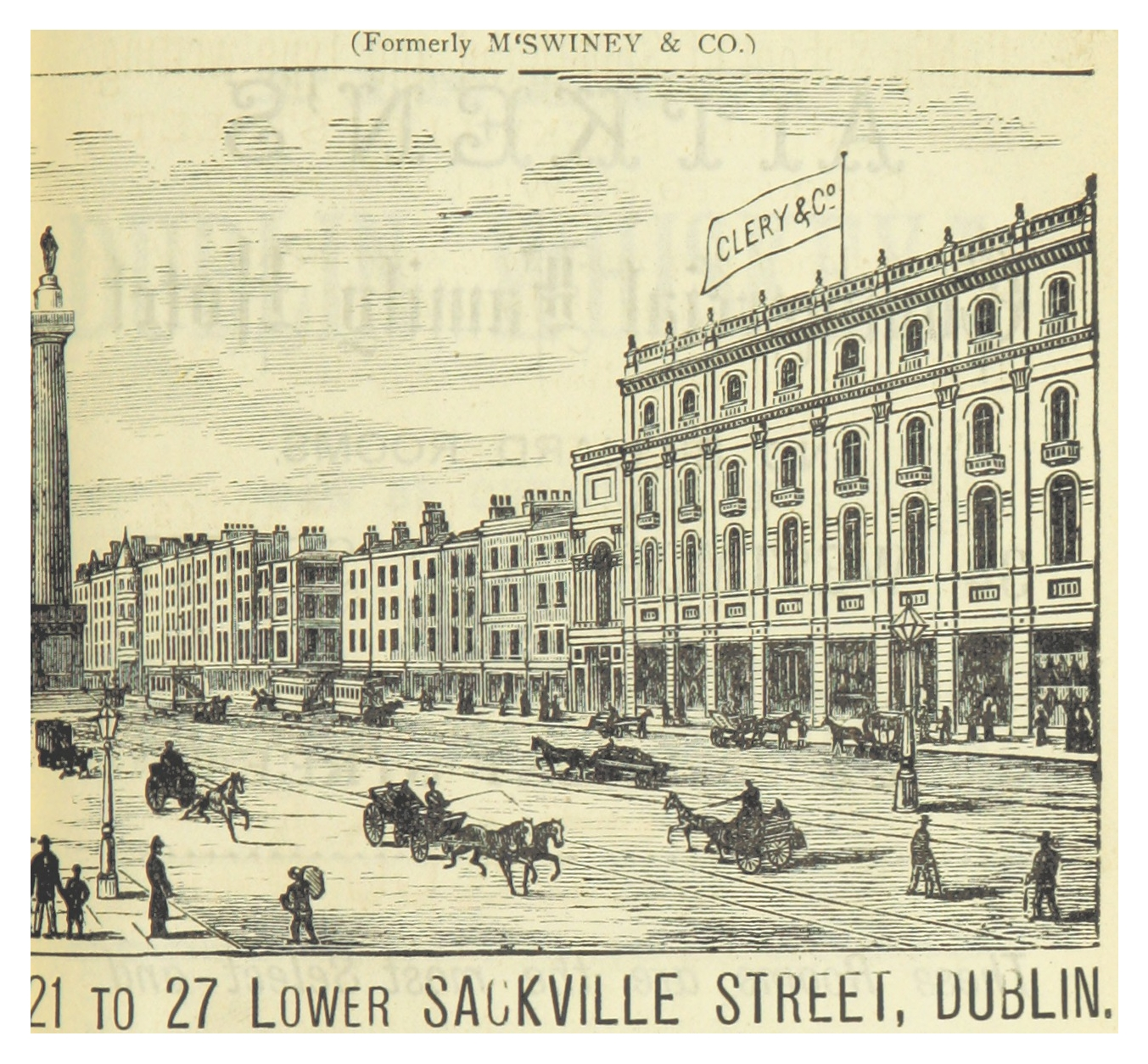
1891 artwork of Clerys in Lower Sackville Street

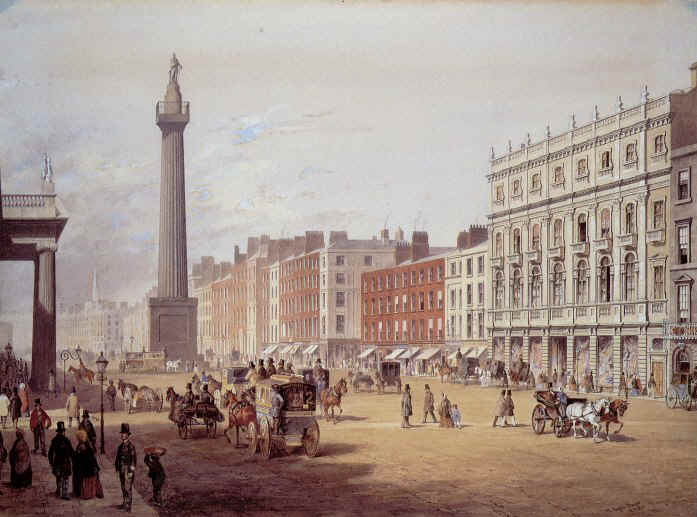
1853 artwork of Nelson's Pillar and Clerys

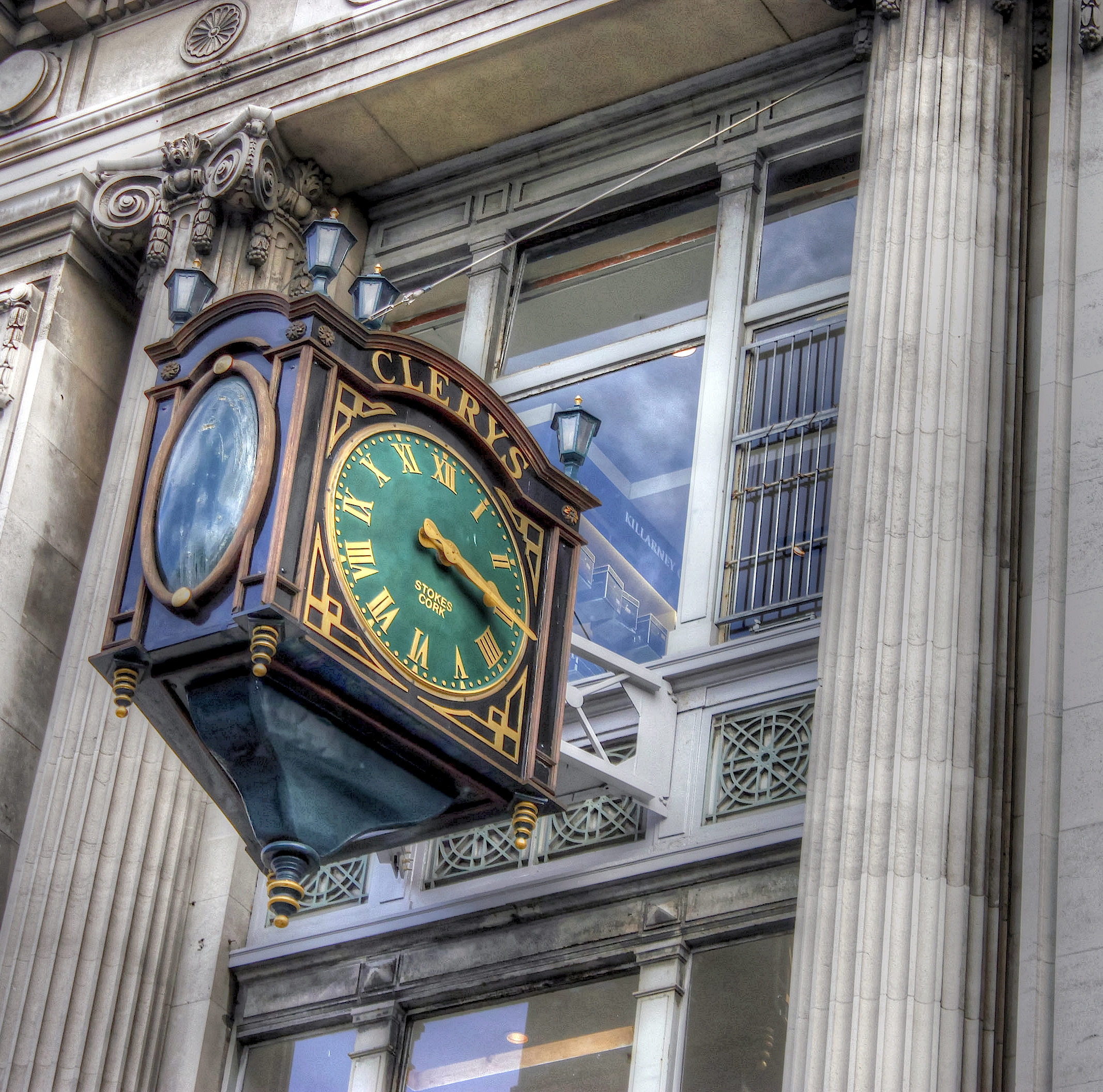
The Clerys clock in 2012

== Clerys Quarter ==
Plans to redevelop the main Clerys building and adjoining properties into a mixed-use development of offices, retail and leisure called Clerys Quarter were announced, with to commence in 2019. Press Up Entertainment (run by Paddy McKillen Jr and Matt Ryan, and known for a number of pubs, bars and hotels as well as Wowburger and Tower Records Ireland) announced that they would operate a boutique hotel, to be called The Clery, to include a rooftop bar and a restaurant.

Work was due to begin in early 2019 and the launch of the Clerys Quarter has been announced and delayed multiple times. After delays related to COVID-19, it was ultimately scheduled to open for Christmas 2021, but in October 2021, this was moved to September 2022., with this blamed on "lockdowns and a shortage of labour and building supplies". In January 2022, this was revised to mid-2022, and then "for Christmas season 2022". In January 2023, an exhibition about the shop's history was held, as the building was stated to be "completed within weeks" and to open pre-summer. The opening was moved to autumn 2023, and it was later announced that it would launch ahead of Christmas 2023, with one food outlet actually opening. The next part of the complex, including a sports supply shop, is now due to open in March 2024.

The Guiney & Co. building on Talbot Street remains closed as of 2023.

== Guiney and Co. and the Michael Guineys chain ==
Guiney and Co was Clerys' discount department store located at 79-80 Talbot Street, not far from one of the Michael Guineys Dublin stores at 83 Talbot St. Even though the two stores were run by separate companies, the latter chain was founded by a nephew of Denis Guiney called Michael, who had been working as the buyer of household goods and furnishings at Clerys, before setting up his own Dublin store in 1971.

== See also ==
- List of Irish companies
