= Mangqu =

Town in Guinan County, Qinghai, China

Mangqu 茫曲镇 · མང་ཆུ་གྲོང་རྡལ།
- Town
- Location of the city centre in Qinghai
- Coordinates: 35°35′N 100°45′E
- Country: China
- Province: Qinghai
- Autonomous prefecture: Hainan
- County: Guinan

Area
  - Total: 91.22 km^{2} (35.22 sq mi)
- Elevation: 3,200 m (10,500 ft)

Population (2011)
  - Total: 15,782
  - Density: 173.0/km^{2} (448.1/sq mi)
- Time zone: UTC+8 (China Standard)

Mangqu (Tibetan: མང་ཆུ་གྲོང་རྡལ།, Chinese: 茫曲) is a town in Guinan County, Qinghai, China. The seat of Guinan County is located in Mangqu. Mangqu has an altitude of about 3200 m. Mangqu has a population of about 7000. Some original residents in the Longyangxia area were relocated in Mangqu because of the construction of Longyangxia Dam.
