= Guinea company =

Guinea Company may refer to:

- Company of Guinea, a Portuguese company
- Guinea Company (London), an English company
- Guinea Company of Scotland, a short-lived Scottish trading company
- Danish Guinea Company, a Dano-Norwegian chartered company

== See also ==
- Guinea (disambiguation)
