= Shagou Township, Hainan Tibetan Autonomous Prefecture =

Shagou Township 沙沟乡
- Township
- Shagouxiang
- Location in Qinghai
- Coordinates: 35°54′59″N 100°56′17″E
- Country: People's Republic of China
- Province: Qinghai
- Autonomous prefecture: Hainan Tibetan Autonomous Prefecture
- County: Guinan County

Area
  - Total: 936.9 km^{2} (361.7 sq mi)

Population (2010)
  - Total: 7,786
  - Density: 8.310/km^{2} (21.52/sq mi)
- Time zone: UTC+8 (China Standard)
- Local dialing code: 974

Shagou Township (Chinese: 沙沟乡) is a township in Guinan County, Hainan Tibetan Autonomous Prefecture, Qinghai, China. In 2010, Shagou Township had a total population of 7,786 people: 3,894 males and 3,892 females: 1,927 under 14 years old, 5,370 aged between 15 and 64 and 489 over 65 years old.
