= Guinia =

Guinia may refer to:

- Guinia, Niger, a Nigerian village in the municipality of Tanout, Tanout Department
- Güinía de Miranda, a Cuban village in the municipality of Manicaragua, Villa Clara Province
- Mahmoud Guinia (1951-2015), a Moroccan Gnawa musician, singer and guembri player

== See also ==
- Guinea, African country
- Guinea (disambiguation)
