= Taxiu =

Taxiu 塔秀乡
- Township
- Taxiuxiang
- Location in Qinghai
- Coordinates: 35°31′10″N 100°55′35″E
- Country: People's Republic of China
- Province: Qinghai
- Autonomous prefecture: Hainan Tibetan Autonomous Prefecture
- County: Guinan County

Area
  - Total: 971 km^{2} (375 sq mi)

Population (2010)
  - Total: 9,719
  - Density: 10.0/km^{2} (25.9/sq mi)
- Time zone: UTC+8 (China Standard)
- Local dialing code: 974

Taxiu (Chinese: 塔秀乡) is a township in Guinan County, Hainan Tibetan Autonomous Prefecture, Qinghai, China. In 2010, Taxiu had a total population of 9,719 people: 4,886 males and 4,833 females: 2,963 under 14 years old, 6,281 aged between 15 and 64 and 475 over 65 years old.
