= Stark Hall =

Coordinates: 33.2294°N 97.1277°W

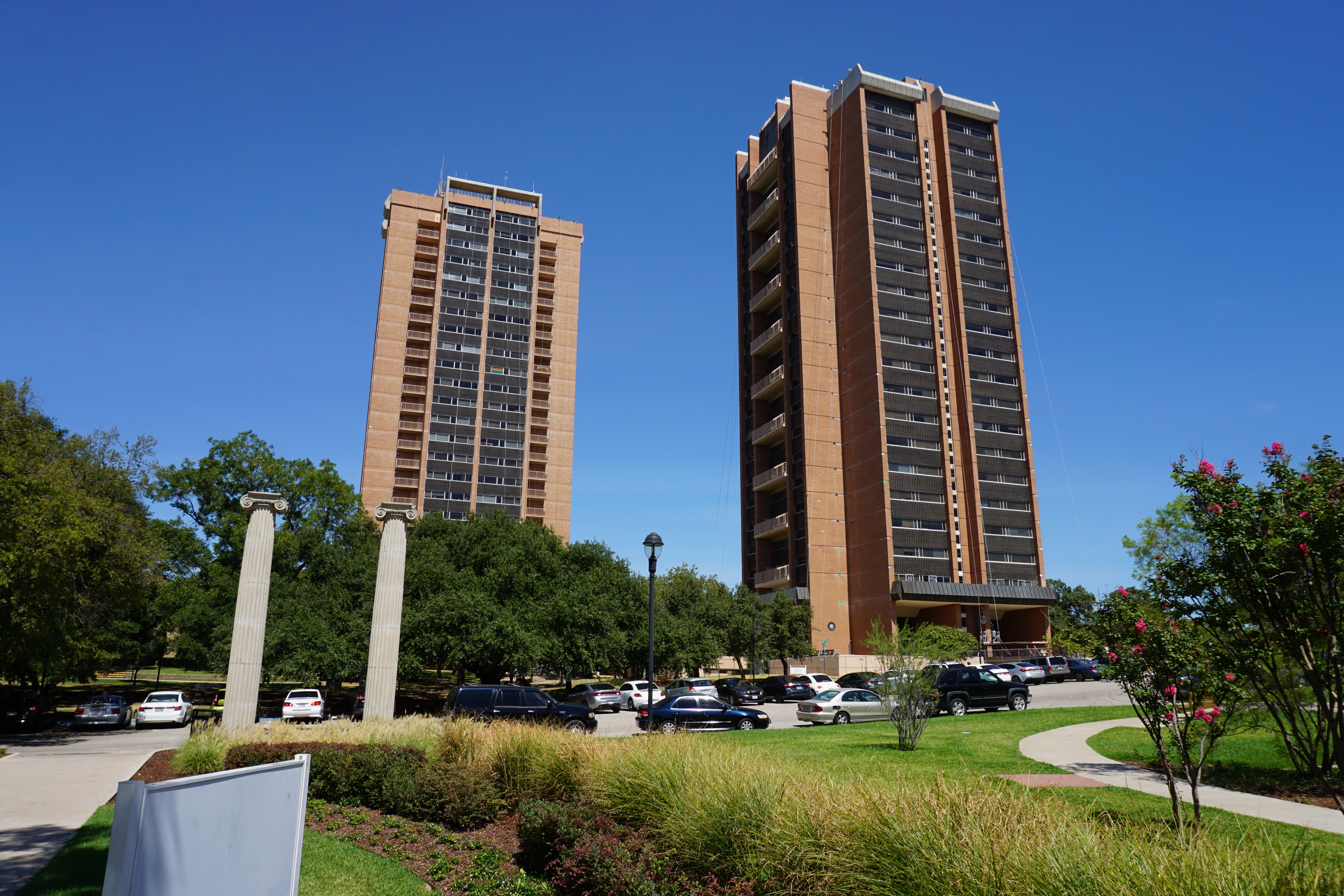
Stark Hall (right) and Guinn Hall in 2015

Stark Hall is an American residence hall at Texas Woman's University, and was the tallest building in Denton, Texas until the completion of the adjacent Guinn Hall. Traditionally single-sex, in fall 2016, it became co-educational and houses first year and sophomore students only.
