= Guineys =

Irish department store chain

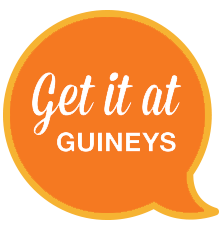
- Logo used since 2015

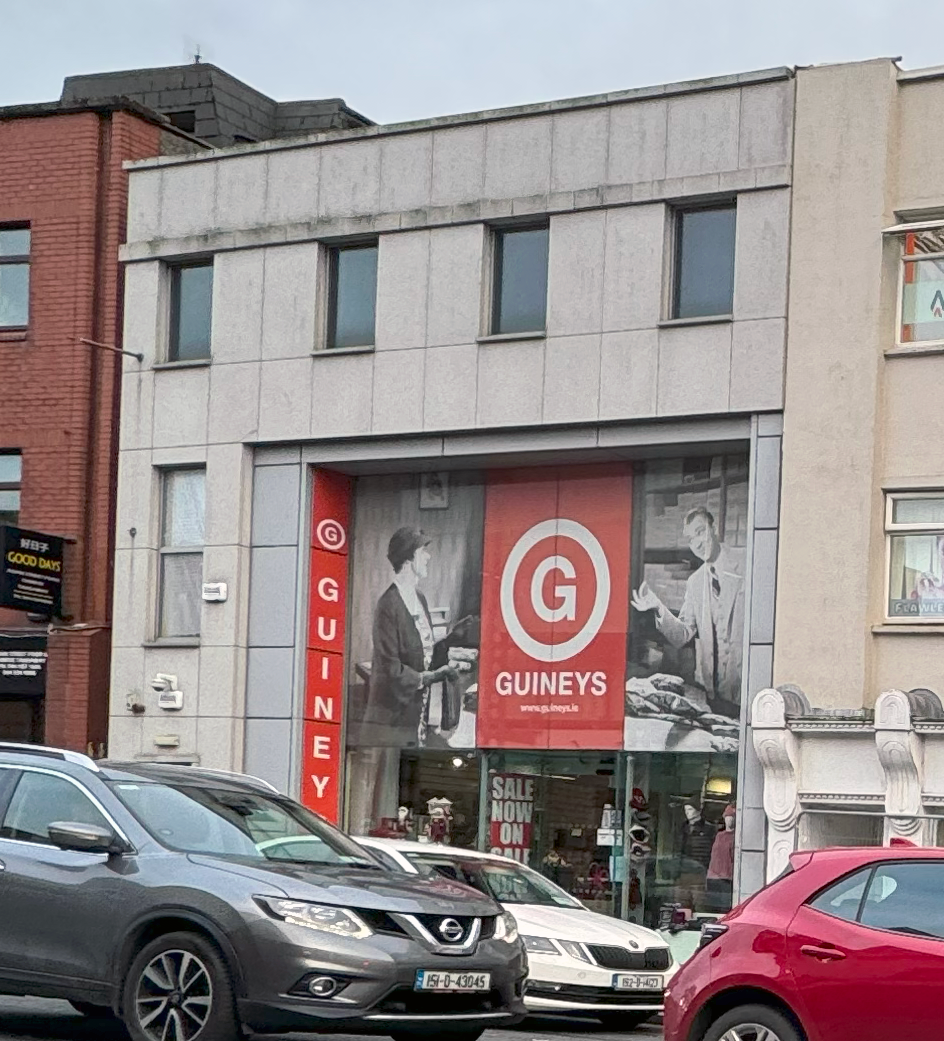
- Guineys store in Mullingar
- Type: Private
- Industry: Retail
- Founded: 4 June 1971; 55 years ago in Dublin, Ireland
- Headquarters: 11-12 North Earl Street, Dublin, Ireland
- Number of locations: 11 (2023)
- Key people: Michael Guiney (Managing Director)
- Products: Homewares, menswear, womenswear and children's clothing
- Number of employees: 200
- Website: guineys.ie

Guineys (/ˈɡaɪniːz/), is a chain of Irish department stores founded in June 1971. The chain specialises in homewares, menswear, womenswear and children's clothing. They have 11 stores in Ireland, located in Dublin, Limerick, Waterford, Castlebar, Tralee, Cork, Clonmel, Mullingar, Dundalk, Kilkenny, and, as of December 2018, one in Northern Ireland, at Castle Place in central Belfast. It is well known for having its two Dublin stores almost within sight of each other - one on North Earl Street and one on Talbot Street, two streets which run directly into each other, off O'Connell Street.

== History ==
The company was registered on 4 Jun 1971 as Michael Guiney Limited. The chain was solely Dublin based until 1992 when a branch in Cork was opened. Other branches followed in Tralee and Waterford (2004).

The Limerick store was opened in late 2004, occupying the long vacant anchor tenancy of what was previously the Williamscourt Mall on William Street. The Castlebar store opened in December 2008.

Guiney's launched their online store in 2012 which delivers to homes and businesses in the Republic of Ireland. A store was opened in Clonmel in December 2013 then the Mullingar and Kilkenny stores opened in 2015.

The store that opened in December 2018 at Castle Place in central Belfast was the first Guiney's anywhere in the nine counties of Ulster, and is located in a 21,000 square feet (2,000 m^{2}) unit which once housed a British Home Stores branch until August 2016.

== Michael Guiney ==
Michael Guiney came from Limerick and had been working for his uncle Denis Guiney as the buyer of household goods and furnishings at Clerys, before setting up his own Dublin store under the Guineys name in 1971. For many years there were three shops on Dublin's Talbot Street all with the name Guiney in the name, as Michael's stores were joined on the street by Guineys & Co at 79-80 Talbot Street, set up by Clerys/Denis Guiney and in operation until 2012.

== Stores ==
As of 2022 Guineys has twelve stores located in Leinster, Munster, Connacht & Ulster, with two in Dublin.

- Guineys Belfast
- Guineys Castlebar
- Guineys Clonmel
- Guineys Dublin (North Earl Street and Talbot Street)
- Guineys Dundalk
- Michael Guineys Cork
- Guineys Kilkenny
- Guineys Limerick
- Guineys Mullingar
- Guineys Tralee
- Guineys Waterford

== See also ==
- Clerys (a department store group, bought by Kerry businessman Denis Guiney in the 1940s, which once owned the similarly named Guiney and Co store at 79-80 Talbot Street, Dublin)
