= Eddie Holland =

American singer, songwriter, and record producer (born 1939)

- Also known as: Edward Holland; Edward Holland, Jr; Edward James Holland; Edward J. Jr. Holland; Edward J. Holland Jr. James Edward Holland Jr.
- Born: Edward James Holland Jr. October 30, 1939 (age 86); Detroit, Michigan, U.S.
- Genres: R&B, soul, funk
- Occupations: Producer; arranger; singer; songwriter
- Instrument: Vocals
- Years active: 1962–present
- Labels: Motown, Mercury, United Artists, Invictus, Hallmark

Edward James Holland Jr. (born October 30, 1939) is an American singer, songwriter, and record producer. His brother is songwriter and record producer Brian Holland.

== Biography ==
=== Early life ===
Eddie Holland was born in Detroit, Michigan. He has a younger brother, Brian, a songwriter and producer with whom he often collaborated.

=== Career ===
Before Motown, as a singer Holland would work with Berry Gordy in 1958 at Mercury Records for the track “You (You You You You)” which was cowritten and produced by Gordy. Gordy went on to start Motown in 1959 and Eddie Holland and his brother, Brian, would go on and write music for Motown. Although Holland was an early Motown artist who recorded minor hits such as "Jamie", released in 1961, he grew tired of performing and joined his brother Brian and Lamont Dozier to form the songwriting team Holland–Dozier–Holland, serving as the trio's lyricist. H-D-H was responsible for writing and producing much of the material that became known as the Motown sound, including hit records by Martha and the Vandellas, The Supremes, the Four Tops, and The Isley Brothers, among others. Eddie Holland was not credited as a producer for any of their Motown hits; Brian Holland and Lamont Dozier were the credited producers, with only the songwriting was credited to Holland-Dozier-Holland. However, when the trio broke from Motown and founded their own labels in 1968 (Invictus Records and Hot Wax Records), the full H-D-H team including Eddie were credited as producers.

Eddie Holland has written or co-written 143 hits in the US charts and 80 in the UK.

Holland also worked with record producer Norman Whitfield on lyrics for the songs he produced for the Marvelettes and the Temptations, like "Too Many Fish in the Sea" and "Beauty Is Only Skin Deep".

=== Later life ===
Holland also composed songs for the First Wives Club musical, in 2009.

Holland has been involved in several Civil court cases regarding tax, loans, and music rights, in 1985, 1988, 1996, 2017, and 2020.

== Author ==
In 2019, Brian (along with brother Eddie and Dave Thompson) co-authored an autobiography of Holland–Dozier–Holland, entitled Come and Get These Memories, named after the hit single by Martha and the Vandellas.

== Discography ==
=== Albums ===
- Eddie Holland (1962, Motown MT604)
- The Complete Eddie Holland (1995, Marginal Records)
- It Moves Me – The Complete Recordings 1958–1964 (2012, Ace CDTOP2 1331)
- From Mercury to Motown 1958–1962 (2021, Jasmine Records JASCD1122)

=== Singles ===
Year	Title and Catalog Number	Peak Chart Positions		Album
Year	Title and Catalog Number	US	US R&B	Album
1958	"Little Miss Ruby" (Mercury 71290X45) b/w "You (You You You You)"	—	—	Non-album track
1959	"(Where's The Joy?) In Nature Boy" (Kudo 667) b/w "Shock"	—	—	Non-album track
1959	"Merry-Go-Round" (Tamla T 102 / United Artists 172) b/w "It Moves Me"	—	—	Non-album track
1960	"Because I Love Her" (United Artists 191) b/w "Everybody's Going"	—	—	Non-album track
1961	"Magic Mirror" (United Artists 207) b/w "Will You Love Me"	—	—	Non-album track
1961	"The Last Laugh" (United Artists 280) b/w "Why Do You Want To Let Me Go"	—	—	Non-album track
1961	"Jamie" (Motown 1021) b/w "Take A Chance On Me"	30	6	Eddie Holland
1962	"If Cleopatra Took A Chance" (Motown 1030) b/w "What About Me"	—	—	Eddie Holland
1962	"If It's Love (It's Alright)" (Motown 1031) b/w "It's Not Too Late"	—	—	Eddie Holland
1963	"Darling I Hum Our Song" (Motown 1036) b/w "Just A Few More Days"	—	—	Non-album track
1963	"Baby Shake" (Motown 1043) b/w "Brenda"	—	—	Non-album track
1963	"I'm On The Outside Looking In" (Motown 1049) b/w "I Couldn't Cry If I Wanted To"	—	—	Non-album track
1963	"Leaving Here" (Motown 1052) b/w "Brenda"	76	27	Non-album track
1964	"Just Ain't Enough Love" (Motown 1058) b/w "Last Night I Had A Vision" (from Eddie Holland)	54	31	Non-album track
1964	"Candy To Me" (Motown 1063) b/w "If You Don't Want My Love"	58	29	Non-album track
