= Guinea, Nova Scotia =

Community in Nova Scotia, Canada

Coordinates: 44°39′24.95″N 65°35′28.67″W

Guinea in Nova Scotia

Guinea is a community in the Canadian province of Nova Scotia, located in Annapolis County.
