= Angostura Bridge =

Angostura Bridge Puente de Angostura
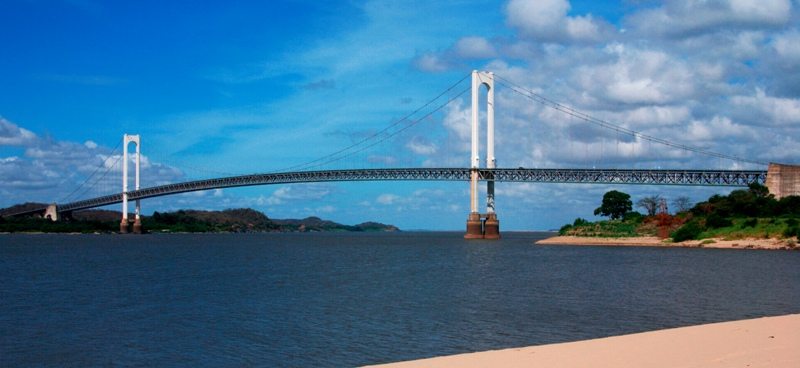
- Coordinates: 8.1444°N 63.5981°W
- Carries: Motor vehicles
- Crosses: Orinoco River
- Locale: Anzoátegui–Bolívar State line
- Named for: narrow spot in the Orinoco
- Preceded by: none
- Followed by: Orinoquia Bridge

Characteristics
- Design: Suspension
- Material: Steel
- Pier construction: Steel
- Total length: 1,678.50 m (5,507 ft)
- Longest span: 712 m (2,336 ft)
- No. of spans: 3

History
- Designer: Precomprimido C.A., Sverdrup & Parcel
- Constructed by: Precomprimido C.A.
- Fabrication by: U.S. Steel Corporation
- Construction start: 1962
- Construction end: 6 January 1967
- Opened: April 27, 1967

Location
- Location over the Orinoco

Angostura Bridge is a suspension bridge that spans the Orinoco River at Ciudad Bolívar, Venezuela. The Spanish word Angostura means "narrows". Built in 1967 at a cost of US$35million, the bridge has a total length of 1,678.50 meters, a distance of 1,272 meters between the two towers, and a main span of 712 meters. Until the opening of the 3,156-metre Second Orinoco crossing 100 km downstream near Ciudad Guayana on 13 November 2006, it was the only bridge across the Orinoco.
