= Guinn Hall =

Building in Denton, Texas

Coordinates: 33.2300°N 97.1282°W

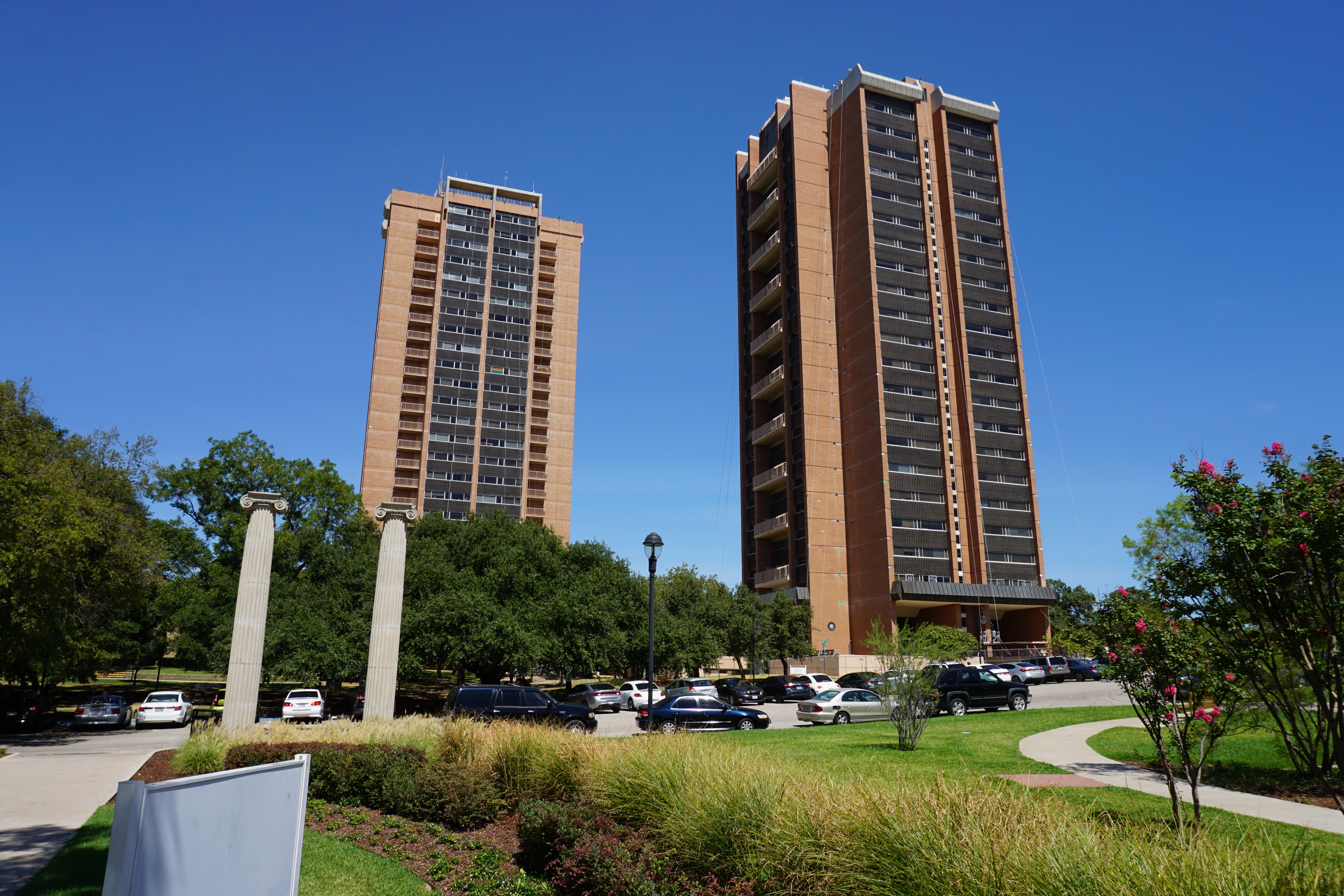
Guinn Hall (left) and Stark Hall in 2015

Guinn Hall is an American residence hall at Texas Woman's University, and is the tallest building in Denton, Texas. Named for the 6th president of Texas Woman's University (1950–1976) the co-ed dormitory faces University Avenue.

The building is 24 stories tall and it houses first time college students only, with each room made up of two to three occupational bedrooms each with its own private bathroom.

Each floor of Guinn is a different Living Learning Community. These LLCs group people based on interests, majors, scholarships, or leadership skills.

Due to housing shortages the university currently places three students to a room for some floors. Bedrooms with three students are less expensive and can be a suitable option for students. It no longer provides telephone service. Each bedroom does have a private bathroom and cable hookup.
