= Guinan County =

Guinan County 贵南县 • མང་ར་རྫོང་།
- County
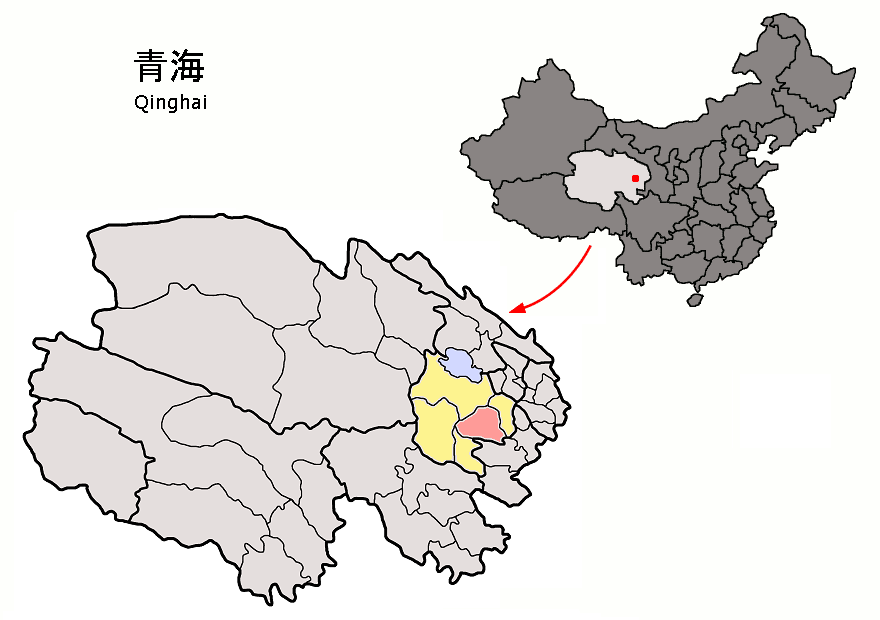
- Guinan County (light red) within Hainan Prefecture (yellow) and Qinghai

- Location of the seat in Qinghai
- Coordinates: 35.587°N 100.748°E
- Country: China
- Province: Qinghai
- Autonomous prefecture: Hainan
- County seat: Mangqu

Area
  - Total: 6,647 km^{2} (2,566 sq mi)

Population (2020)
  - Total: 71,841
  - Density: 10.81/km^{2} (27.99/sq mi)
- Time zone: UTC+8 (China Standard)
- Website: www.guinan.gov.cn

Guinan County

Chinese name
- Simplified Chinese: 贵南县
- Traditional Chinese: 貴南縣
Transcriptions
Standard Mandarin
- Hanyu Pinyin: Guìnán Xiàn
Yue: Cantonese
- Jyutping: gwai^{3}naam^{4} jyun^{2}

Tibetan name
- Tibetan: མང་ར་རྫོང་། or ཀོས་ནན་རྫོང་།
Transcriptions
- Wylie: mang rdzong or kos nan rdzong
- Tibetan Pinyin: Mang Zong or Goinain Zong

Guinan County (Chinese: 贵南县; Tibetan: མང་ར་རྫོང་།) is a county in the east of Qinghai Province, China. It is under the administration of Hainan Tibetan Autonomous Prefecture. The seat of Guinan County is in the Town of Mangqu.

== Administrative divisions ==
Guinan is made up of 3 towns and 3 townships.

Name	Simplified Chinese	Hanyu Pinyin	Tibetan	Wylie	Administrative division code
Towns
Mangqu Town	茫曲镇	Mángqǔ Zhèn	མང་ཆུ་གྲོང་རྡལ།	mang chu grong rdal	632525100
Gomangxung Town (Guomaying)	过马营镇	Guòmǎyíng Zhèn	མགོ་མང་གྲོང་རྡལ།	mgo mang grong rdal	632525101
Sumdo Town (Senduo)	森多镇	Sēnduō Zhèn	སུམ་མདོ་གྲོང་རྡལ།	sum mdo grong rdal	632525102
Townships
Qamdo Township (Shagou)	沙沟乡	Shāgōu Xiāng	བྱ་མདོ་ཞང་།	bya mdo zhang	632525200
Mangra Township (Mangla)	茫拉乡	Mánglā Xiāng	མང་ར་ཞང་།	mang ra zhang	632525202
Tarxü Township (Taxiu)	塔秀乡	Tǎxiù Xiāng	ཐར་ཤུལ་ཞང་།	thar shul zhang	632525203

== Climate ==
Climate data for Guinan, elevation 3,120 m (10,240 ft), (1991–2020 normals, extremes 1981–present)
Month	Jan	Feb	Mar	Apr	May	Jun	Jul	Aug	Sep	Oct	Nov	Dec	Year
Record high °C (°F)	16.1 (61.0)	16.1 (61.0)	22.3 (72.1)	27.7 (81.9)	26.6 (79.9)	27.9 (82.2)	31.8 (89.2)	31.2 (88.2)	29.5 (85.1)	22.4 (72.3)	18.7 (65.7)	13.0 (55.4)	31.8 (89.2)
Mean daily maximum °C (°F)	0.1 (32.2)	3.8 (38.8)	8.2 (46.8)	13.1 (55.6)	16.2 (61.2)	18.7 (65.7)	21.0 (69.8)	21.0 (69.8)	17.1 (62.8)	11.8 (53.2)	6.5 (43.7)	1.6 (34.9)	11.6 (52.9)
Daily mean °C (°F)	−10.6 (12.9)	−6.3 (20.7)	−1.0 (30.2)	4.8 (40.6)	8.9 (48.0)	12.0 (53.6)	14.0 (57.2)	13.4 (56.1)	9.2 (48.6)	2.8 (37.0)	−4.4 (24.1)	−9.7 (14.5)	2.8 (37.0)
Mean daily minimum °C (°F)	−17.9 (−0.2)	−13.8 (7.2)	−8.2 (17.2)	−2.6 (27.3)	2.1 (35.8)	5.9 (42.6)	8.0 (46.4)	7.3 (45.1)	3.6 (38.5)	−3.2 (26.2)	−11.2 (11.8)	−16.9 (1.6)	−3.9 (25.0)
Record low °C (°F)	−28.9 (−20.0)	−27.2 (−17.0)	−21.6 (−6.9)	−15.7 (3.7)	−6.7 (19.9)	−2.5 (27.5)	−0.1 (31.8)	−1.2 (29.8)	−5.8 (21.6)	−14.9 (5.2)	−22.4 (−8.3)	−27.3 (−17.1)	−28.9 (−20.0)
Average precipitation mm (inches)	2.2 (0.09)	3.4 (0.13)	8.5 (0.33)	22.9 (0.90)	61.9 (2.44)	80.5 (3.17)	100.2 (3.94)	96.6 (3.80)	59.6 (2.35)	19.7 (0.78)	2.6 (0.10)	1.5 (0.06)	459.6 (18.09)
Average precipitation days (≥ 0.1 mm)	3.0	2.5	4.4	6.8	13.0	16.4	17.1	15.2	13.4	7.0	1.8	1.3	101.9
Average snowy days	3.7	3.6	5.8	6.6	3.0	0.3	0	0	0.4	4.2	2.5	1.8	31.9
Average relative humidity (%)	43	39	39	45	54	63	68	69	69	59	47	43	53
Mean monthly sunshine hours	222.0	211.1	237.8	242.4	237.1	211.7	226.0	228.9	193.6	226.1	229.7	226.6	2,693
Percentage possible sunshine	71	68	63	61	54	49	51	55	53	66	75	75	62
Source: China Meteorological Administration

== See also ==
- List of administrative divisions of Qinghai
