= Mary Guiney =

Irish businesswoman (1901–2004)

- Born: Mary Leahy; 2 March 1901; Creeves, near Shanagolden, County Limerick, Ireland
- Died: 23 August 2004 (aged 103); Beaumont Hospital, Dublin, Ireland
- Occupation: Businesswoman
- Employer(s): Guiney & Co., Clery & Co. (1941)
- Known for: Chairperson of Clerys, Dublin

Mary Guiney (née Leahy, 2 March 1901 – 23 August 2004) was an Irish businesswoman and centenarian, best known as the long serving chairperson of Clerys & Co.

== Early life and education ==
Mary Leahy, known as May in her youth, was born 2 March 1901 at the family farm at Creeves, near Shanagolden, County Limerick. Her parents were John and Hannah Leahy (née Cuddihy), and it is believed she had an older brother and sister, a younger sister and two younger brothers. Her family sent her to the Dominican College in Eccles Street in Dublin. After she left school, she gained employment in Guineys & Co. on Talbot Street, owned by Denis Guiney.

== Career ==
Leahy married widower Denis Guiney on 19 October 1938, in the St Mary's Pro-Cathedral, Dublin. She became a partner in the business, with the couple overseeing the flourishing of their shop at 79-80 Talbot street. This success allowed them to purchase the department store Clerys & Company on Dublin's main street, O'Connell Street, after it went into receivership in 1941. After buying Clerys, they formed a new limited company, Clery & Co. (1941), in August 1941 and Mary Guiney became one of just two directors, alongside her husband, in a move unusual for the time.

Despite the timing of their takeover, during World War II, she was noted as a 'keen businesswoman', with Clerys seeing an increase of 1,000% in turnover. The Guineys invested in the store, installing 42 sales counters over the shop's four floors, as well as a ballroom, two restaurants and three bars. Clerys was credited by some with keeping numerous Irish small suppliers in business during the war, emergency and afterwards, and having a positive effect on the Irish economy more broadly.

Clerys became known for its major sales, which took place twice a year. During the first sale, in 1941, O'Connell Street was blocked with traffic, and £100,000 was taken in its first week. Owing to Guiney's strong religious belief, Clerys hosted many charity events, in particular for elderly or isolated Dublin residents. Beginning in 1954, Clerys provided afternoon tea with entertainment for 100 older people. By 1967 the store had over 1,000 employees and was drawing in thousands of customers from across Ireland.

Denis Guiney died in 1967, and after contesting some provisions of her husband's will, which had attempted to distribute his shares widely among relatives, Guiney retained control of their business with a 52% shareholding, also taking the roles of managing director and chairperson of the board. Mary Guiney remained MD until 1977, while Denis Guiney's nephew, Arthur Walls, took over the day-today running of the stores.

== Later life ==
Guiney nearly died in May 1974, when Guineys on Talbot Street was caught in Dublin and Monaghan bombings.

Over time, Guiney gave relatives positions within the business, some senior, but continued to retain a controlling stake and resisted suggestions to sell the company or major assets. Among the sales she refused was a takeover bid from Dublin serial entrepreneur John Teeling in 1987, and a failed buyout bid in 1999 by Clerys' general manager, Tom Rea. She commented on the Teeling bid: "Why would I want to sell the best business and building in Ireland?" Until the age of 99, Guiney visited the shop and attended board meetings. She signed the company's annual accounts until 2004, when she was 103, making her potentially the oldest active company director in Ireland or the United Kingdom.

According to some, Guiney was seen as not making the most of the opportunities which arose during the Irish boom economic years in the late 1990s. In later years, Guiney continued to resist changes in the business, which some think damaged the store and hindered its ability to garner new or younger customers.

In 1999 she sold her house, the Victorian-era "Auburn" on the Howth Road in Clontarf, for £4 million; the house was demolished and the site intensively developed. Guiney moved to The Meadows in Raheny.

== Death ==
Guiney died in Beaumont Hospital on 23 August 2004. Following a funeral mass in St Anthony's Church, Clontarf, Guiney was buried alongside her husband, and his first wife, Nora Gilmore, in Glasnevin Cemetery. Following her death, her shares were left to a family trust, and later distributed to several members of the extended Guiney family. The Guineys had no children but there were legacies beyond the shares for three nieces, while Guiney's house and a substantial legacy were left to her friend and housekeeper, and over 25,000 euro each for the parish priest of St Anthony's, Clontarf, and for the saying of masses in six churches.
