= Orinoquia Bridge =

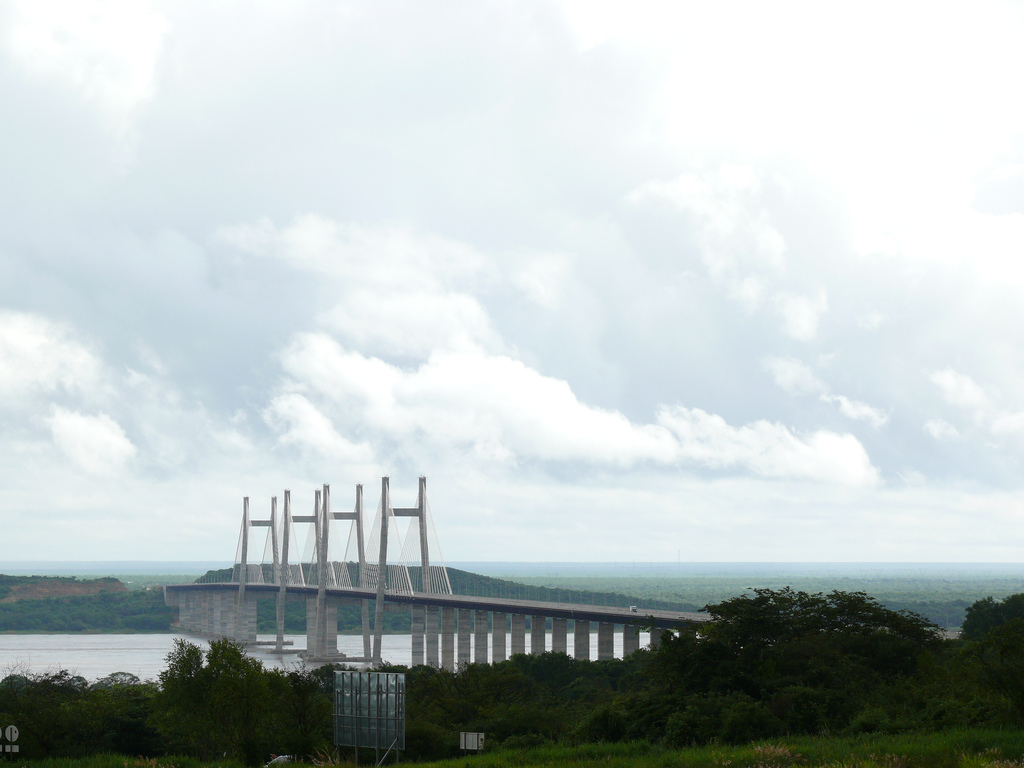
- Coordinates: 08°16′24″N 62°53′02″W
- Carries: road traffic, rail traffic
- Crosses: Orinoco
- Locale: Ciudad Guayana

Characteristics
- Design: Cable stayed
- Total length: 3,156 metres (10,354 ft)
- Longest span: 300 metres (984 ft)
- Clearance above: 41 metres (135 ft)

History
- Opened: 13 November 2006

Location
- Interactive map of Orinoquia Bridge

The Second Orinoco crossing or Orinoquia Bridge is a combined road and railway bridge over the Orinoco River near Ciudad Guayana, Venezuela. It was inaugurated on November 13, 2006, and named Orinoquia Bridge. Prior to its construction, the only crossing of the Orinoco was the Angostura Bridge around 100 km upstream at Ciudad Bolívar that was opened in 1967.

At the site chosen for the bridge, the Orinoco is three kilometres wide with two navigation channels separated by a small island that is revealed during the low-water season. The average discharge of the river at that point varies between 66 000 m^{3}/s and 85 000 m^{3}/s, flowing at up to 2.6 m/s and with a seasonal variation in level of 12.5 m.

The crossing is composed of approximately 4.5 km of structures and carries four lanes of road traffic separated into two carriageways by a single railway track in the centre. It consists of two cable stayed navigation spans each of 300 m with a south approach 1320 m long composed of 22 60 m spans and a north approach of 636 m composed of ten 60 m spans and one of 36 m. The two navigation spans have a clearance of 41 m above water level and are supported by four 120 m tall H-shaped pylons via two planes of cable stays. Unusually, these spans do not lead directly into each other as at other multi-span cable stayed bridges such as the Millau Viaduct, but are anchored at a fixed point on the mid-stream island.

The bridge was built to complement the existing Angostura Bridge and to provide a more direct connection with the important industrial city of Ciudad Guayana. In particular, it was intended to provide for a future rail connection to allow the city's heavy industrial products to be transported to the ports of Venezuela's Caribbean coast. River transport on the Orinoco includes oceangoing ships, but because of its high sediment load the Orinoco has to be constantly dredged. In addition the crossing strengthens transport links between Venezuela and Brazil to the south which is important for Brazilian exports. This was one reason why President Lula da Silva of Brazil attended the inauguration together with Venezuela's Hugo Chávez.

Near the bridge, there is Orinoco powerline crossing, whose pylons are the tallest man-made structures in South America today.

== See also ==
- List of road-rail bridges
