= Upper Guinea Creoles =

Upper Guinea Creoles can refer to:

- Guinea-Bissau Creole — Creole spoken in Guinea-Bissau
- Cape Verdean Creole — Creole spoken in Cape Verde

Also related

- Portuguese-based creole languages — creole languages with Portuguese as the lexifier language
