= The Guianas =

Geographical region in north-eastern South America

Political map of the Guianas

The Guianas, (Note: Pronounced /ɡaɪˈænəz/, /ɡaɪˈɑːnəz/, /ɡiˈɑːnəz/ or /ɡiˈænəz/) (Note: Dutch: de Guyana's, French: les Guyanes, Portuguese: as Guianas, Spanish: Guayana; Sranan Tongo: den Gayana(kondre) [ɡajana(kondɾe)] or Sranan Tongo: den Kayana(kondre) [kajana(kondɾe)]) also spelled Guyanas or Guayanas, are a geographical region in north-eastern South America. In contemporary use, the term usually refers to "the three Guianas": Guyana, Suriname, and French Guiana.

More broadly, it refers to the South American coast from the mouth of the Orinoco to the mouth of the Amazon.

From West to East the region is divided into:

- formerly Spanish or Venezuelan Guiana, now the Delta Amacuro State and Guayana Region of Venezuela;
- formerly British Guiana, now Guyana, independent since 1966.
- formerly Dutch Guiana or Surinam, now Suriname, independent since 1975.
- French Guiana, an overseas department and region of France.
- formerly Portuguese or Brazilian Guiana, now the Amapá State of Brazil.

The three Guianas have a combined population of 1,718,651; Guyana: 804,567, Suriname: 612,985, and French Guiana: 301,099. Most of the population is along the coast. Due to the jungles to the south, the Guianas are one of the most sparsely populated regions on Earth.

Prior to c. 1815 there was a string of mostly Dutch settlements along the coast which changed hands several times. They were mostly several kilometres upriver to avoid the coastal marshes which were only drained later.

- British Guiana (before 1793 part of Dutch Guiana):
  - Berbice (183 km (114 mi) SE of Georgetown) — 1627 Dutch, 1781-1831: like Essequebo
- Dutch Guiana
  - Demerara (Georgetown) — 1745 Dutch from Essequibo, 1781-1831: like Essequibo
  - Essequibo (32 km (20 mi) NW of Georgetown) — c 1616 Dutch, 1665 British occupation, 1781 British occupation, 1782 French occupation, 1783 Dutch reacquisition, 1793 British, 1831 British Guiana
  - Pomeroon (110 km (70 mi) NW of Georgetown) — 165?: Dutch, 1689: abandoned after French destruction, Dutch later return, 1831 to British Guyana.
  - Nickerie (320 km (200 mi) SE of Georgetown) — 1718 Dutch
  - Surinam — 1651 English, 1667 Dutch, 1799 English during French wars, 1814 restored to Dutch but England keeps British Guiana
- French Guiana
  - Cayenne — 1604, 1643 French fail, 1615 Dutch fail, 1635 Dutch, 1664 French, 1667 English capture and return, French, 1676? Dutch, 1763? French, 1809 Anglo-Portuguese, 1817 French
  - Sinnamary (160 km (100 mi) NW of Cayenne) — 1624 French, captured by Dutch and English several times, 1763: French

To the east and up the lower Amazon, there were a number of English, French and Dutch outposts that either failed or were expelled by the Portuguese. To the west, Spanish Guyana was thinly settled and interacted slightly with Pomeroon.

== History ==
=== Pre-colonial period ===
Before the arrival of European colonials, the Guianas were populated by scattered bands of Indigenous Lokono people. The Indigenous tribes of the Northern amazon forests are most closely related to the Natives of the Caribbean; most evidence suggests that the Lokono immigrated from the Orinoco and Essequibo River Basins in Venezuela and Guiana into the northern islands, and were then supplanted by more warlike tribes of Kalinago Indians, who departed from these same river valleys a few centuries later.

Over the centuries of the pre-colonial period, the ebb and flow of power between Arawakan and Kalinago interests throughout the Caribbean resulted in a great deal of intermingling (some forced through capture, some accidental through contact). This ethnic mixing, particularly in the Caribbean margins like the Guianas, produced a hybridised culture. Despite their political rivalry, the ethnic and cultural blending between the two groups had reached such a level that, by the time the Europeans arrived, the Kalinago/Lokono complex in Guiana was so homogeneous that the two groups were almost indistinguishable to outsiders. Through the contact period following Columbus's arrival, the term "Guiana" was used to refer to all areas between the Orinoco, the Rio Negro, and the Amazon, and was seen so much as a unified, isolated entity that it was often referred to as the "Island of Guiana."

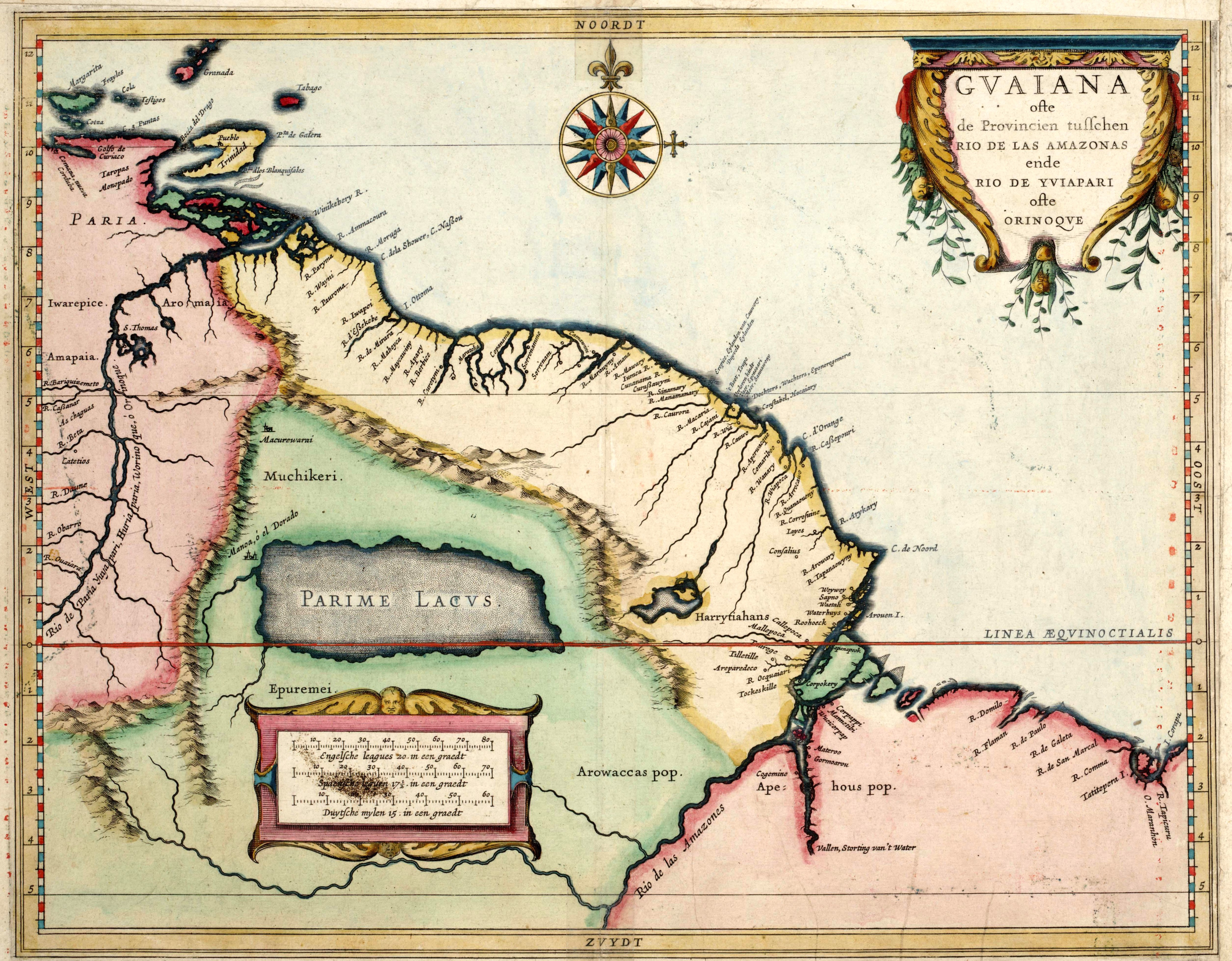
Parime Lacus on a map by Hessel Gerritsz (1625). Situated on the west coast of the lake, the so-called city Manoa or El Dorado

=== European colonisation ===
Christopher Columbus first spotted the coast of the Guianas in 1498, but real interest in the exploration and colonisation of the Guianas, which came to be known as the "Wild Coast," did not begin until the end of the sixteenth century. In 1542, when Francisco de Orellana reached the mouth of the Amazon, he was pushed by winds and currents northwest along the Guiana coast until he reached a Spanish settlement west of Trinidad. Walter Raleigh began the exploration of the Guianas in earnest in 1594. He was in search of a great golden city at the headwaters of the Caroní River. A year later he explored what is now Guyana and eastern Venezuela in search of "Manoa", the legendary city of the king known as El Dorado. Raleigh described the city of El Dorado as being located on Lake Parime far up the Orinoco River in Guyana. Much of his exploration is documented in his books The Discoverie of the Large, Rich, and Bewtiful Empyre of Guiana, published first in 1596, and The Discovery of Guiana, and the Journal of the Second Voyage Thereto, published in 1606.

After the publication of Raleigh's accounts, several other European powers developed interest in the Guianas. The Dutch joined in the exploration of the Guianas before the end of the century. Between the start of the Dutch Revolt in 1568 and 1648, when the Treaty of Münster was signed with the Spanish, the Dutch cobbled together different ethnicities and tribes and religious faiths into a viable economic entity. In their imperial ventures, the Dutch concerned themselves more with establishing profitable networks of trading outposts than with conquering territory. With this goal in mind, the Dutch dispatched explorer Jacob Cornelisz to survey the area in 1597. His clerk, Adriaen Cabeliau, related in his diary the voyage of Cornelisz and his survey of Indian groups and their potential as trading partners. Throughout the seventeenth century, the Dutch expanded their trading colonies and outposts in the region and in the neighbouring Caribbean islands under the banner of the Dutch West India Company. The company, established in 1621, benefited from a larger investment of capital than the English trading companies, primarily from foreign investors like Isaac de Pinto, a Portuguese Jew. The area was also cursorily explored by Amerigo Vespucci and Vasco Núñez de Balboa. In 1608 the Grand Duchy of Tuscany also organised an expedition to the Guianas which was cut short by the untimely death of the Grand Duke.

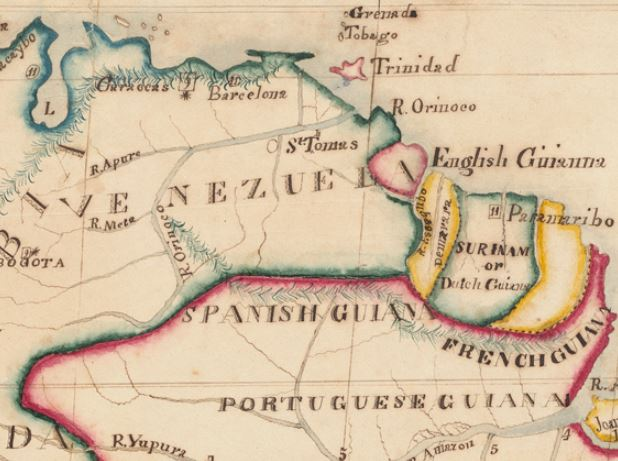
Venezuela and the Guianas (1831), according to English cartography.

English and Dutch settlers were regularly harassed by the Spanish and Portuguese, who viewed their settlements as violating the Treaty of Tordesillas. In 1613, Dutch trading posts on the Essequibo and Corantijn Rivers were demolished by Spanish troops sent from neighbouring Venezuela under the premise of stamping out privateering, as authorized under a cédula of the Spanish Council of the Indies and King Philip III. Nonetheless, the Dutch returned in 1615, founding a new settlement at present-day Cayenne (later abandoned in favour of Suriname), one on the Wiapoco River (now more commonly known as the Oyapock) and one on the upper Amazon. By 1621, a charter was granted by the Dutch States-General, but even a few years prior to the official chartering a fort and trading post had been built at Kijkoveral, under the supervision of Aert Groenewegen, at the confluence of the Essequibo, Cuyuni, and Mazaruni Rivers. British settlers also succeeded in establishing a small settlement in 1606 and a much larger one in modern-day Suriname in 1650, under the leadership of former Barbadian governor Francis Willoughby, Lord Parham.

The French had also made less significant attempts at colonisation, first in 1604 along the Sinnamary River. The settlement collapsed within a summer, and initial attempts at settlement near modern-day Cayenne, beginning in 1613, were met with similar setbacks. French priorities—land acquisition and Catholic conversion—were not easily reconciled with the difficulties of initial settlement-building on the Wild Coast. Even as late as 1635, the King of France granted permission to the whole of Guiana to a joint-stock company of Norman merchants. When these merchants made a settlement near the modern city of Cayenne, failure ensued. Eight years later, a reinforcement contingent led by Charles Poncet de Brétigny found only a few of the original colonists left alive, living among the aborigines. Later that year, among the combined total of the original surviving settlers, the reinforcement contingent led by de Brétigny, and a subsequent reinforcement later in the year, only two individuals remained alive long enough to reach the Dutch settlement on the Pomeroon River in 1645, begging for refuge. Though some trading outposts that could be considered permanent settlements were founded as early as 1624, French "possession" of the land now known as French Guiana is not recognised as having taken place until at least 1637. Cayenne itself, the first permanent settlement of comparable size to the Dutch colonies, experienced instability until 1643.

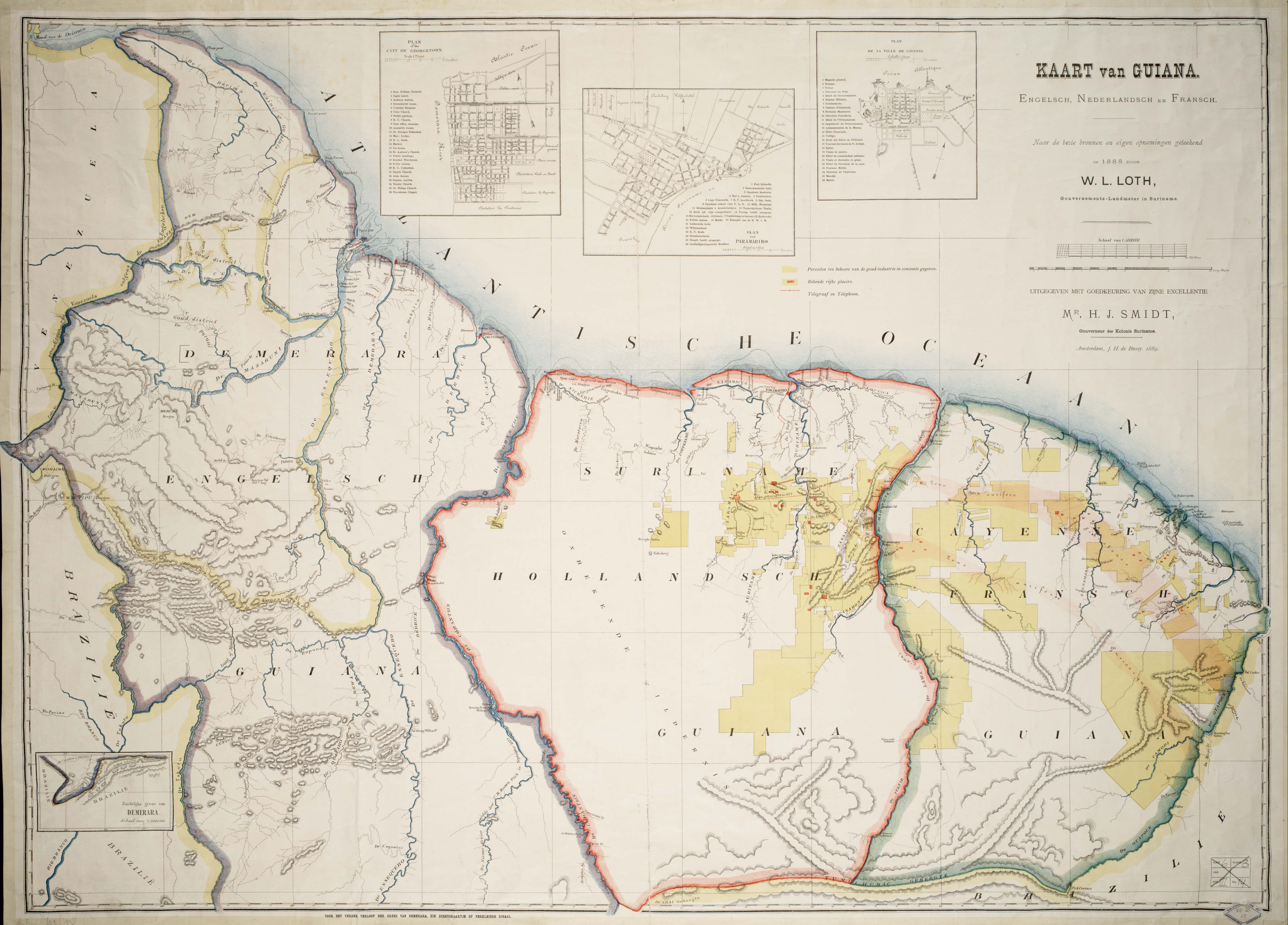
Map of the Guianas (1888)

The Dutch appointed a new governor of the Guiana settlements in 1742. In this year, Laurens Storm van 's Gravesande took over the region. He held the position for three decades, coordinating the development and expansion of the Dutch colonies from his plantation Soesdyke in Demerara. Gravesande's tenure brought significant change to the colonies, though his policy was in many ways an extension of his predecessor, Hermanus Gelskerke. Commandeur Gelskerke had begun pressing for change from a trading focus to one of cultivation, especially of sugar. The area east of the existing Essequibo colony, known as Demerara, was relatively isolated and encompassed the trading areas of just a few indigenous tribes, thus it contained only two trading outposts during Gelskerke's term of office. Demerara, though, showed great potential as a sugar-cultivating area, so the commandeur began shifting focus toward the development of the region, signifying his intentions by transferring the administrative center of the colony from Fort Kijkoveral to Flag Island, on the mouth of the Essequibo River, further east and closer to Demerara. These operations were carried out by Gravesande, acting as the Secretary of the Company under Gelskerke. Upon Gelskerke's death, Gravesande continued the policy of Demerara expansion and the move to sugar cultivation.

Conflict among the British, Dutch, and French continued throughout the seventeenth century. The Treaty of Breda (1667) sealed peace between the English and the Dutch. The treaty allowed the Dutch to retain control over the valuable sugar plantations and factories on the coast of Suriname which had been secured by Abraham Crijnssen earlier in 1667.

All the colonies along the Guiana coast were converted to profitable sugar plantations during the seventeenth and eighteenth centuries. War continued off and on among the three principal powers in the Guianas (the Netherlands, France, and Britain) until a final peace was signed in 1814 (the Convention of London), heavily favouring the British. By this time France had sold off most of its North American territory in the Louisiana Purchase and had lost all but Guadeloupe, Martinique, and French Guiana in the Caribbean region. The Dutch lost Berbice, Essequibo, and Demerara; these colonies were consolidated under a central British administration and would be known after 1831 as British Guiana. The Dutch retained Suriname.

After 1814, the Guianas came to be recognised individually as British Guiana, French Guiana, and Dutch Guiana.

== Demographics ==
Due to the isolated geography of the Guianas, the region is one of the most isolated and sparsely populated on Earth. In most of the region, the population is almost entirely concentrated on the coast of the Atlantic Ocean at the mouth of river deltas, in the cities of Georgetown, Paramaribo, Cayenne, and Macapá. However, in Venezuela, major cities are inland: the largest city in the Guianas, Ciudad Guayana in Venezuela, is one that is inland, with a population of almost 1 million people, Ciudad Bolivar with an estimated population of 422,578 as well as another major city, Puerto Ayacucho, with a population of 41,000.

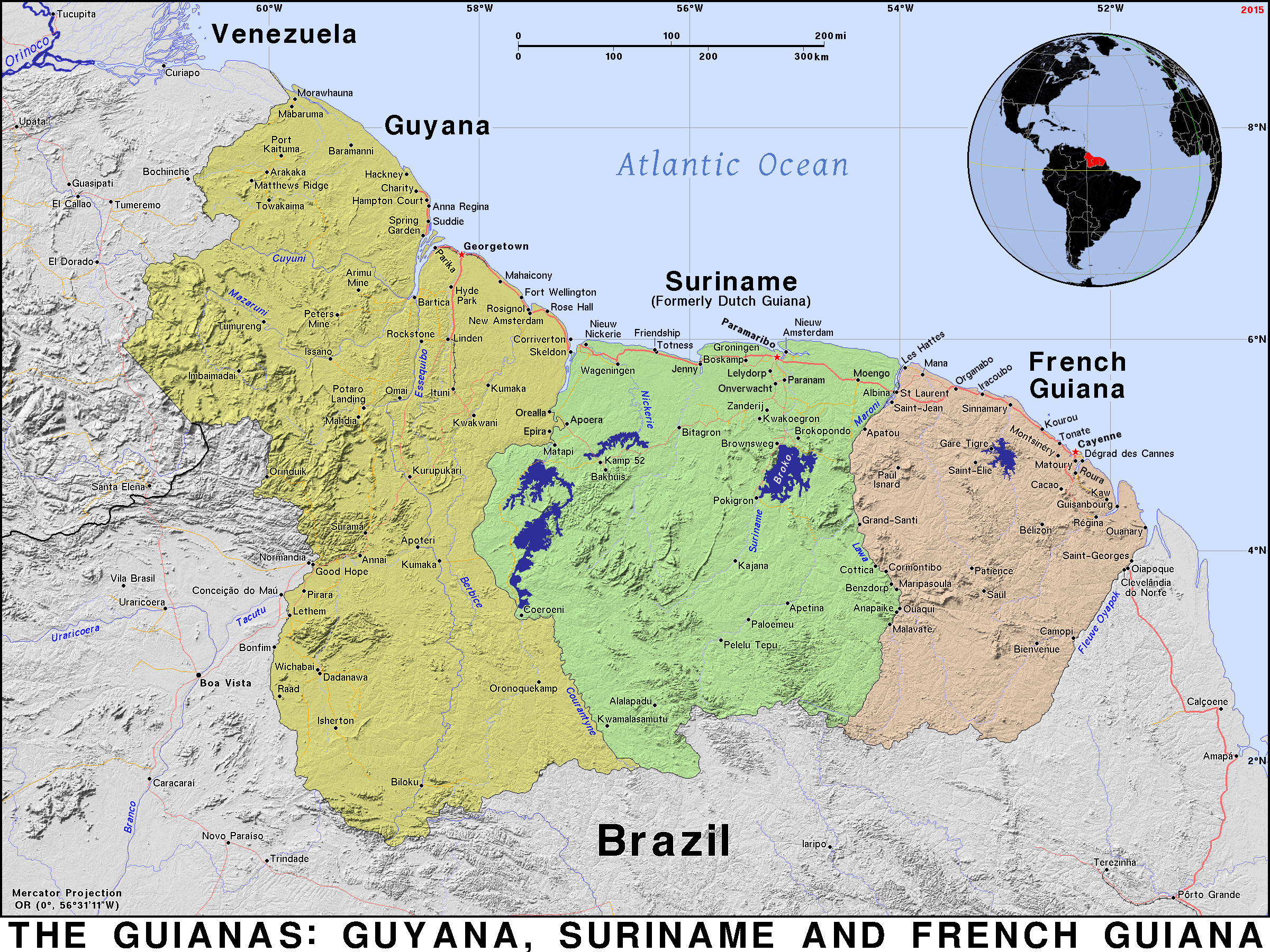
Guyana, Suriname, and French Guiana are the only South American nations outside of Spanish/Portuguese area.

Spanish, English, Dutch, French, and Portuguese are spoken in the Guianas: in Guayana, Guyana, Suriname, French Guiana, and Amapá, respectively. Suriname is the only sovereign nation, other than the Netherlands, where Dutch is the sole official language. Languages spoken locally by specific ethnic groups include Arawakan and Cariban languages, Caribbean Hindustani, Maroon languages, Javanese, Chinese, Hmong, Haitian Creole, and Arabic.

The diverse population and isolation of the region has led to the development of a number of creole and pidgin languages; these include Guyanese Creole in Guyana, Sranan Tongo, Saramaccan, Ndyuka, Matawai, and Kwinti in Suriname, and French Guianese Creole in French Guiana, and Karipúna French Creole in Amapa. These creole languages are based on English in Suriname and Guyana with significant influence from Dutch, Arawakan, Cariban, Javanese, Hindustani, West African languages, Chinese, and Portuguese. French Guianese Creole and Karipuna French Creole are based on French with influences from Brazilian Portuguese and Arawakan and Cariban languages. Ndyuka is one of the only creole languages that uses its own script, called Afaka syllabary. Pidgin languages spoken in the Guianas include Panare Trade Spanish, a pidgin between the Panare language and Spanish; and Ndyuka-Tiriyó Pidgin, a pidgin spoken in Suriname until the 1960s formed between the creole Ndyuka language and the Amerindian Tiriyó language. Extinct creole languages in the Guianas are Skepi Creole Dutch and Berbice Creole Dutch, both based on Dutch and spoken in Guyana.

The Guianas is also one of the most racially diverse regions on Earth, particularly in Guyana, Suriname, and French Guiana, due to their long histories of migration to the region brought by slavery and indentured labour. The entire region has a large Amerindian population of the Arawakan and Carib language groups. There are a number of uncontacted peoples in the region due to the region's isolation. The two largest ethnic groups in Guyana and Suriname are Indians, who are largely descended from indentured labourers from the Bhojpuri regions of India, with smaller numbers from South India; and Africans, descendants of enslaved West Africans brought to the region during colonial times. Africans are further divided into Creoles, who are located along the coastal regions, and Maroons, who are descendants of people who escaped slavery into the interior regions of the country. Multiracial people, who are largely Dougla people, of African and Indian descent, make up a growing proportion of the population in Guyana and Suriname. Javanese Surinamese are another major group in Suriname, who are descendants of indentured labourers recruited from Dutch colonies in Indonesia, and both Guyana and Suriname have Chinese and Portuguese communities, as well as a small number of Jews in Suriname. French Guiana's population is largely African; there are also minorities of European, Chinese, and Hmong descent. French Guiana has also been a recipient of immigration from surrounding countries, especially Guyana, Suriname, and Brazil, as well as from Haiti.

== See also ==
- Borders of Brazil
- Borders of Venezuela
- Brazilian Guyana
- Guiana Shield
- Guiana Island (South America)
- Guyana–Venezuela relations
- Guyana–Suriname relations
- Suriname–Venezuela relations
- France–Suriname relations
- France–Venezuela relations
- Brazil–Guyana relations
- Brazil–Suriname relations
- Brazil–Venezuela relations
