= Hugo Jabini =

Saramaka Maroon politician

Hugo Jabini is a Saramaka Maroon politician and environmental leader from Suriname. In 1998, he became the spokesman of the Association of Saamaka Authorities (Dutch acronym VSG). In 2007, he and Wanze Eduards were part of the VSG team that won a landrights lawsuit against the Surinamese government in international court. For their work in the landrights struggle they shared the Goldman Environmental Prize in 2009. From 2010 to 2015, Jabini was a member of the Surinamese National Assembly, as part of the National Democratic Party (NDP).

== Biography ==
Jabini is from village of Tutubuka in the resort Boven Suriname. Both his mother and his grandfather were captains. In 2010 he graduated from the Anton de Kom University after a comparative law study comparing Surinamese and Saamaka land rights protections.

=== Land rights activism ===
In 1998 Jabini became spokesman of the Association of Saamaka Authorities (Dutch acronym VSG), an organization in which 61 Saamaka villages worked together in the struggle for Indigenous land rights. These rights were being threatened by industrial mining and logging. On November 28, 2007, Jabini and Wanze Eduards, also of the VSG, won a lawsuit against the state of Suriname that they had filed on behalf of the Saramaka people at the Inter-American Court of Human Rights. For their work on the land rights struggle the two men were jointly awarded the Goldman Environmental Prize in 2009.

=== Political career ===
In May 2010, Jabini was elected member of the Surinamese National Assembly as part of the NDP slate of candidates in the multiethnic political coalition called Megacombinatie. After the Megacombinatie reached a deal to form a government with the Maroon parties of A-Combinatie, Jabini found himself in the governing coalition for the entirety of its five-year term.

He was also chosen from among fifteen candidates as a member of Parliamentarians for Global Action.

==== Continued land rights advocacy ====
In his capacity as VSG spokesman, Jabini expressed concern in November 2010 about a new government initiative to link Paramaribo to Brazil by road using a route through Saamaka territory. The following month Jabini announced, again in his capacity as VSG spokesman, that the Saamaka people would give the government more time to implement the requirements of the Saamaka Verdict, though the implementation was already past-due.

By 2012, Jabini had become critical of the ruling party of which he was a member, telling the newspaper Starnieuws that barely anything had been done on the landrights question. The same year, Jabini and the VSG facilitated the launch of a formal mapping of the bounds of Saamaka territory, which was to be performed in consultation with the other tribal peoples of Suriname. The process was nearly complete by February the following year.

In early 2013, Fergus McKay, the VSG's American lawyer, accused the government of violating the Saamaka Verdict by granting a gold and waterworks concession to the Canadian mining company Iamgold. Jabini voted with the government, arguing that the agreement covered land outside of traditional Saamaka territory. Government advisor Eddy Josefzoon accused Jabini of playing both sides of the issue. When Josefzoon asserted a week later that the landrights work in Boven Suriname amounted to secessionism, Jabini denied the allegation. He counselled that the time was not right for confrontationalism with the government, counselling patience until the end of its term in 2015, and continued to express trust in the government implementation of the verdict.

Also in 2013, Jabini voted with the government to secure World Bank and US State Department funding to participate in the REDD+ conservation program, with the close involvement of the VSG and Saamaka and other tribal peoples of Suriname. Later that year, after an advisory committee was named to oversee the implementation of the Saamaka Verdict, Jabini complained that the government would have a majority on the committee, and the VSG was not being consulted.

==== Parliamentary educational program coordination in Boven Suriname ====
In early 2012, Jabini supported the rollout of a new recreational activity program run in Sipaliwini District by the Ministry of Youth and Sport. The program was launched in his home village of Tutubuka. That same year, the ruling coalition named Jabini coordinator of a bundle of educational programs in Boven Suriname, including after-school activities.

In February 2013, Jabini revealed on the floor of the Assembly that a boarding house being built for male and female students enrolled in the school VOJ Atjoni was still unfinished after more than a year of construction stoppage. As a result, the students were being lodged at a nearby tourist camp and parents were concerned about the risk of sexual harassment at the camp, which they had raised with the leadership council of Botopasi. Jabini reported that the Ministry of Education was unaware of the situation, and that he would work with the Ministry of Public Works to resolve it. In July, Jabini advocated that a weekslong electrical outage affecting Atjoni and nearby Pokigron be resolved as it had caused teachers to advocate the closing of the school. In October he announced, in his capacity as spokesman for VSG, that the association was donating 24,000SRD for the completion of the boarding house.

==== Continued political engagement ====
After the death of Saamaka Granman Belfon Aboikoni in 2014, his younger brother Albert was nominated to succeed him, and Jabini explained the concerns of certain sectors of Saamaka leadership that the nomination had not followed appropriate consultative processes. Later that year, he was one of three governing coalition representatives who attended the opening of the Ministry of Trade and Industry's first office in Sipaliwini, located in Atjoni.

=== Post-political career ===
In 2015 Jabini was not included on the NDP's candidate list for the general election. He was not given a reason for this change but said that he believed it might have to do with critiques he offered of the government landrights policy during a budget development process. He remained dissatisfied that the government was still giving out natural resource extraction concessions in Saamaka territory.

In 2016 Jabini attended the Paramaribo launch of Suriname's participation in the REDD+ conservation program, for which he'd voted as an assemblyman. Speaking on behalf of tribal communities, he underlined the importance that they be involved in any government action relating to their territories as a memorandum of understanding was signed to that purpose.
