= Pikin Slee =

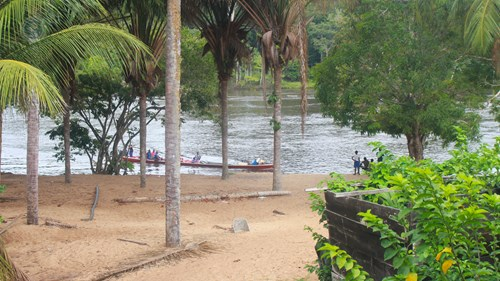
- Upper Suriname River from Pikin Slee

- Location in Suriname
- Coordinates: 4.253333°N 55.443889°W
- Country: Suriname
- District: Sipaliwini
- Resort (municipality): Boven Suriname

Population
  - Total: ~3,000

Pikin Slee (also Pikienslee) is a village on the Upper Suriname River in the resort Boven Suriname of the Sipaliwini District. It is home to about 3,000 people, and the second largest village of the Saramaka Maroons, after Aurora.

== Overview ==
Pikin Slee has a school, clinic, and the Saamaka Marron Museum. Pikin Slee adheres to the Afro-Surinamese Winti religion. The majority of the population make their living from agriculture. Pikin Slee is home to a group of Rastafari wood carving artists, whose work is on display in the museum. A holiday eco-resort is located near the village. On 14 November 2011, the Saamaka Marron Museum was founded. The museum is dedicated to the cultural heritage of the Saramaccans with a special emphasis on art.

The current chieftain of the village is Wanze Eduards. During the 1990s logging companies encroached on the village of Pikin Santi. Extensive flooding caused by faulty bridging resulted in the loss of large plots of agricultural land. Eduards was awarded the Goldman Environmental Prize in 2009, jointly with Hugo Jabini, for their efforts to protect their traditional land against logging companies, by bringing the case to the Inter-American Commission on Human Rights, and further to the Inter-American Court.

In late 2019, solar energy panels were installed in the village to provide 24 hours of electricity.

Pikin Slee can be reached by boat from Pokigron which is the end of the road. Villages to the south of Pokigron can only be accessed by boat. An unpaved road leads to the Botopasi Airstrip.
