= Medische Zending =

- Headquarters: Paramaribo
- Chairperson: C.N. Rozenblad
- Managing director: E.D. van Eer
- Website: medischezending.sr

Medische Zending Primary Health Care Suriname, commonly known as Medische Zending (Dutch for "medical mission") or MZ is a Surinamese charitable organization offering primary healthcare to remote villages in the interior of Suriname.

== History ==
The history of Medische Zending began on 3 October 1740 with J. Franz Reynier. Reynier, a medical doctor and missionary, and his wife came to Suriname on behalf of the Moravian Church. The purpose was not just to be a missionary, but also to provide medical health care including operations.

Medische Zending was established in 1765 when Ludwig Christiaan Dehne, Rudolf Stoll, and Thomas Jones established a base near the Suriname River which became the first clinic. The evangelism efforts started to decline with the British seizing of the Dutch colonies during the Napoleonic Wars and ended in 1808, however the first hospital remained operational until 1817. It was not until 1919 when a outpatient clinic was founded at Botopasi.

On 2 Januari 1974, the foundation Medizebs was established to continue the work of the Church and to transfer Medische Zending to the Ministry of Health.

== Healthcare centres ==
Medische Zending operates 52 primary healthcare centres in the Surinamese interior:

- Afobaka
- Agaigoni
- Apoema
- Apoera
- Balingsoela
- Brokopondo
- Brownsweg
- Corneliskondre
- Cottica
- Debike
- Djumu
- Donderskamp
- Drietabiki
- Gakaba
- Godo Holo
- Goejaba
- Hekoenoenoe
- Jaw Jaw
- Kajana
- Kalebaskreek
- Klaaskreek
- Kambaloa
- Karmel
- Kawemhakan
- Kwakoegron
- Kwamalasamutu
- Ladoani
- Langatabiki
- Lebidotie
- Marchallkreek
- Nason, Suriname
- Nieuw Jacobkondre
- Nieuw Koffiekamp
- Nieuw Lombe
- Paloemeu
- Peleloe Tepoe
- Poesoegroenoe
- Phedra
- Pokigron
- Puleowime
- Semoisie
- Sipaliwini Savanna
- Stoelmanseiland
- Soekoenale
- Tapoeripa
- Victoria
- Washabo
- Witagron
