= Djumu =

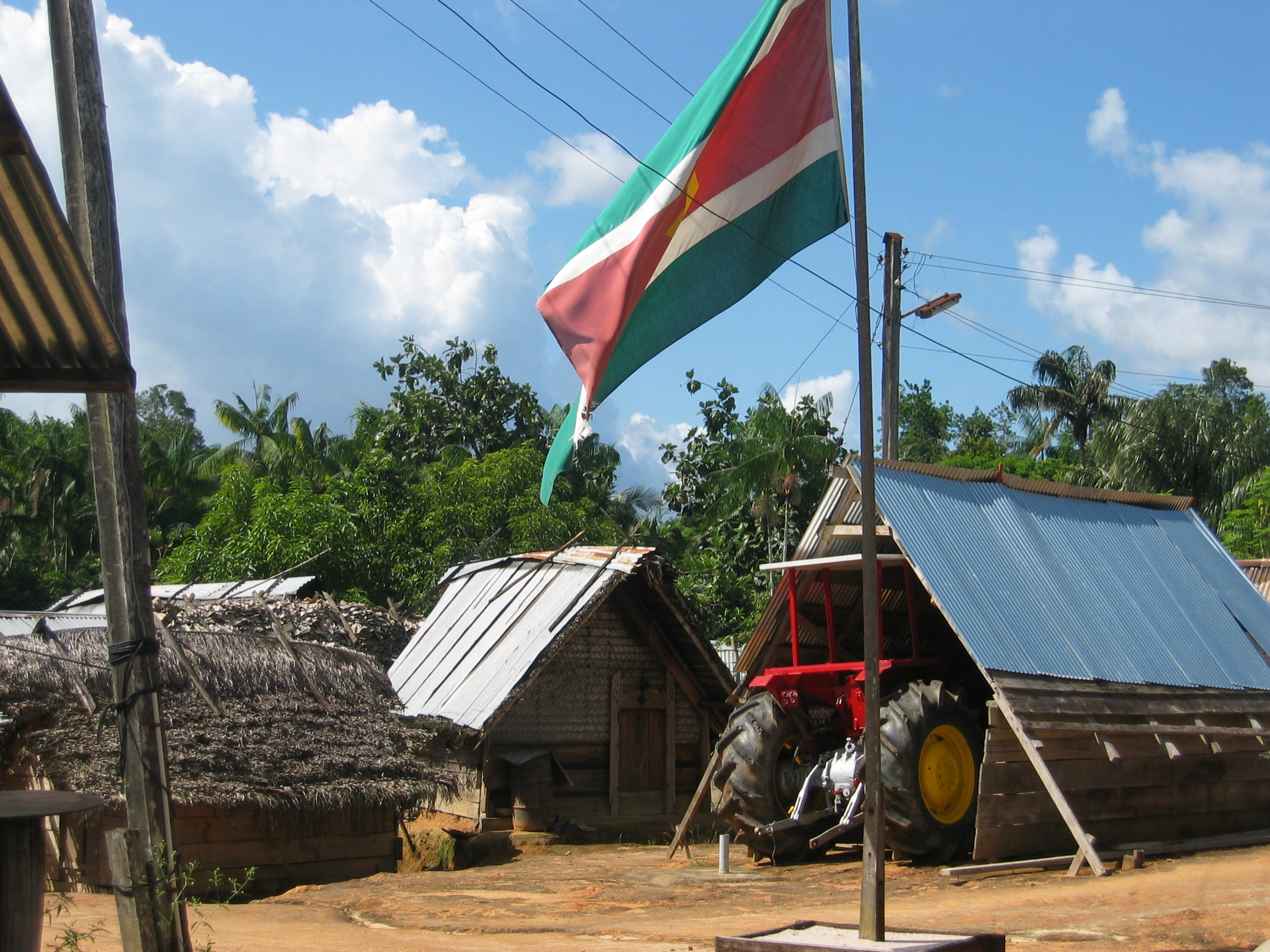
- Djumu (2005)

- Location in Suriname
- Coordinates: 4°0′50″N 55°28′20″W
- Country: Suriname
- District: Sipaliwini District
- Resort (municipality): Boven Suriname

Djumu, also spelled Djoemoe, is a village in Suriname. It is located at the confluence of the Gran Rio and the Pikin Rio which continue as the Upper Suriname River. The village is home to Maroons of the Saramaka tribe.

== Healthcare ==
Djumu is home to a Medische Zending healthcare centre. Djumu and neighbouring villages were isolated from the rest of Suriname by rapids. The 1,500 people who lived in and near Djumu at the time petitioned granman Agbago Aboikoni for a hospital. The Jaja Dande Hospital was constructed in 1962.
