= Kajana, Suriname =

Kajana
- Village
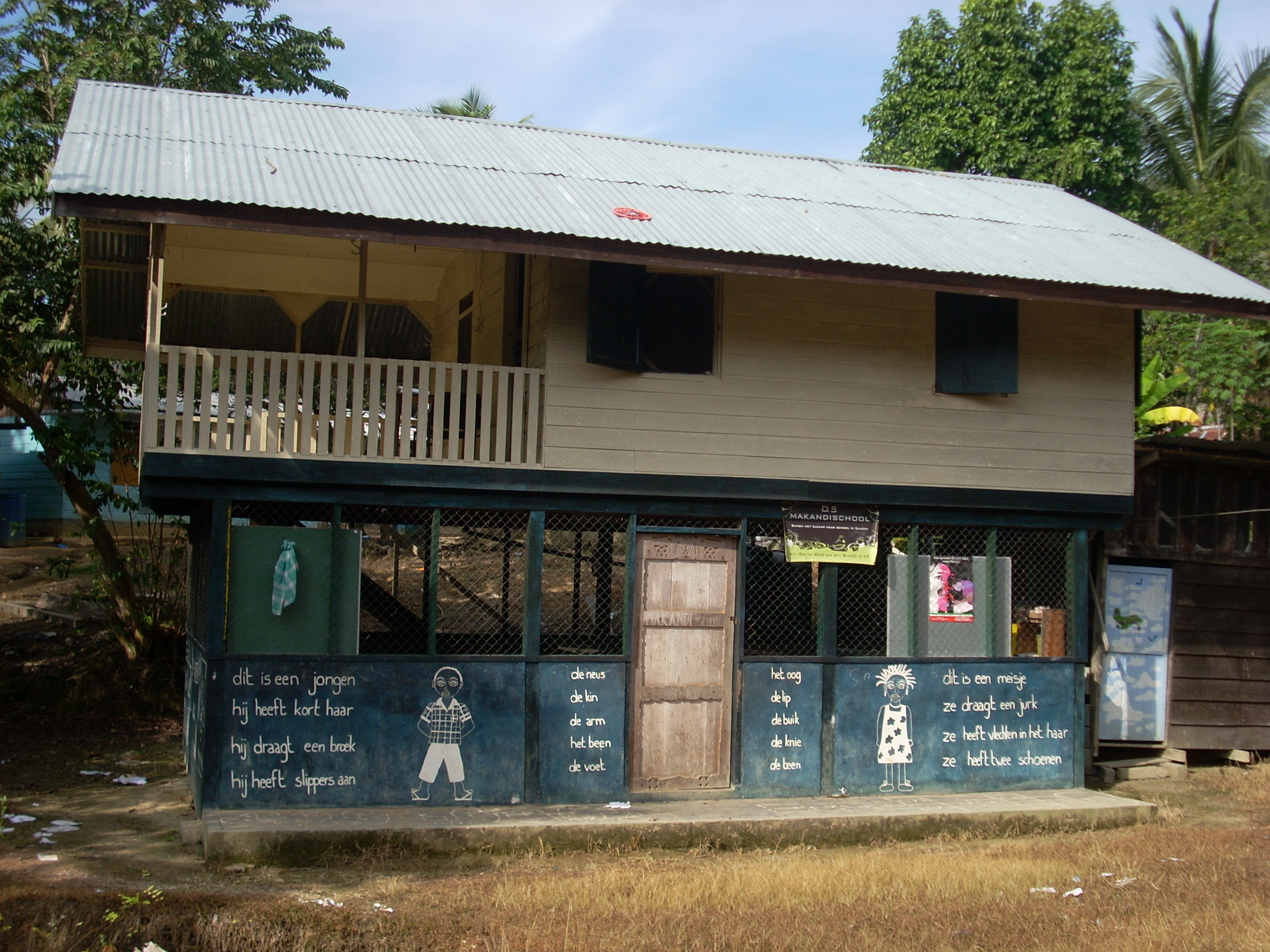
- School in Kajana

- Location in Suriname
- Coordinates: 3°54′2″N 55°34′21″W
- Country: Suriname
- District: Sipaliwini District
- Resort (municipality): Boven Suriname

Population
  - Total: ~200
- Sources: HERE Maps

Kajana (also spelled Cajana and Kayana) is a village in Sipaliwini District, Suriname. It lies on the Gaan-lio (Gran Rio), which together with the Pikin Rio (Little Rio) forms the Suriname River. The population call themselves Kadosi-nengre after Cardoso who was the owner of the plantation they ran away from. The village is home to Maroons of the Saramaka tribe.

The town has a population of about 200 people. The town has a first-aid medical center, a radio station called Radio Thijs, a primary school, and a locally owned kindergarten. Kajana is served by Cayana Airstrip.

== Healthcare ==
Kajana is home to a Medische Zending healthcare centre.

== See also ==
- Kajana Sign Language
