= Abenaston =

- Location in Suriname
- Coordinates: 4°27′1″N 55°21′14″W
- Country: Suriname
- District: Sipaliwini
- Resort (municipality): Boven Suriname

Population (2005)
  - Total: ~700

Abenaston is a village on the Upper Suriname River in Suriname with a population of about 700 people in 2005. The population consists of Saramaka Maroons.

The village was founded at its current location in the early 20th century with the help of the Moravian Church. There was a nearby settlement prior to that which was abandoned, because a feud had resulted in a part of the tribe moving to Botopasi.

The village has a school, church, and a clinic. The resources of the village are shared with the nearby village of Sukunal.

Abenaston is located 3.0 nm from Pokigron which is the end of the road. Villages to the south of Pokigron can only be accessed by boat.
