= Wanze Eduards =

- Known for: Grassroots environmentalism
- Awards: Goldman Environmental Prize (2009)

Wanze Eduards is a Saramaka leader from the Republic of Suriname for the village of Pikin Slee. During the 1990s logging companies encroached on the village of Pikin Santi. Extensive flooding caused by faulty bridging resulted in the loss of large plots of agricultural land.

Eduards joined efforts with Hugo Jabini of the nearby village Tutubuka to fight the companies. He was awarded the Goldman Environmental Prize in 2009, jointly with Jabini, for their efforts to protect their traditional land against logging companies, by bringing the case to the Inter-American Commission on Human Rights, and further to the Inter-American Court. Their efforts resulted in a landmark ruling regarding the right of tribal and indigenous people in the Americas to control the exploitation of natural resources in their territories.
