= Goddo, Suriname =

Goddo
- Location in Suriname
- Coordinates: 4°0′57″N 55°28′36″W
- Country: Suriname
- District: Sipaliwini District
- Resort (municipality): Boven Suriname

Goddo is a small village in Suriname. The village sits on the Upper Suriname River, 1.81 kilometres north of the Pikin River. Goddo can be reached via the Djumu Airstrip, or by boat from Pokigron. The village is home to Maroons of the Saramaka tribe.
