= Danta Bai =

- Location in Suriname
- Coordinates: 4°30′8″N 55°19′50″W
- Country: Suriname
- District: Sipaliwini District
- Resort (municipality): Boven Suriname

Danta Bai, also called Dan ta bai, is a village on the Upper Suriname River. It is located in municipality (resort) Boven Suriname in Brokopondo District in Suriname.

Danta Bai can be reached by car on the way from Paramaribo, Eight kilometers before Pokigron to the left. There are a number of group accommodations. The flow of the river is strong here. One can reach it by boat from Pokigron as well.

Nearby towns and villages include Abenaston (4.1 nm), Pokigron (1.4 nm), Mofina (15.8 nm), Baikutu (4.2 nm) and Zoewatta (3.6 nm).
