= Jaw Jaw =

- Village
- Location in Suriname
- Coordinates: 4°25′31″N 55°22′22″W
- Country: Suriname
- District: Sipaliwini District
- Resort: Boven Suriname

Population
  - Total: ca. 400

Jaw Jaw, also Yaw Yaw, is a village of Saamaka Maroons in the Boven Suriname resort of the Sipaliwini District of Suriname. The village is located on the Suriname River.

Jaw Jaw is a transmigration village built for the inhabitants of Lombé which was flooded by the Brokopondo Reservoir after the construction of the Afobaka Dam. The village was built in 1964 on a site which had been previously used for coconut production. Some of the original inhabitants of Lombé founded Nieuw Lombé near Berg en Dal. Originally the village was home to 700 people, but in 1976, the population was estimated at several hundred, because many inhabitants had left for the city.

The village has a school, a clinic, and a Roman Catholic church. There is an ecotourism resort on Isadou, an island in the Suriname River across from the village.

== Bibliography ==
- Bijl, H. van der; Eerenstein, J.H.W. (1976). "DE TRADITIONELE LANDBOUW VAN DE BOSLANDCREOLEN IN HET DISTRICT BROKOPONDO". Wageningen University and Research (in Dutch).
- Kempen, Michiel van (2002). Een geschiedenis van de Surinaamse literatuur. Deel 2 (in Dutch). Paramaribo: Okopipi. ISBN 9991464069.
- Plan Bureau (2014). "Planning Office Suriname - Districts 2009-2013" (PDF). Planning Office Suriname (in Dutch).
