= Pikin Rio =

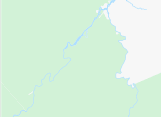
- Gran Rio (left) and Pikin Rio (right)
- Etymology: Little River

Physical characteristics
- Source: Franssen Herderschee Peek
  - coordinates: 3°25′38″N 55°58′4″W
- Mouth: Upper Suriname River
  - coordinates: 4°0′49″N 55°28′36″W

Basin features
- Progression: Suriname River → Atlantic Ocean; Sipaliwini District
- Waterfalls: Kumbaval

The Pikin Rio (translation: Little River) is a river that originates in the Surinamese interior, in the Sipaliwini District.

The river originates at the Franssen Herderschee Peek and is fed from the Pineapple Mountain (Ananasberg). The main rapids is the Kumbaval (Kumbasula). The villages there are home to Saramaca Maroons. Asidonhopo that is located at the Pikin Rio is the residence of the granman of the Saramaca.

The Pikin Rio joins the Gran Rio at Tapawatrasula near the village of Djumu, where it continues as the Upper Suriname River.

== See also ==
- List of rivers of Suriname
