= Asidonhopo =

Asidonhopo Asidonopo (Eastern Maroon Creole)
- Village
- Location within Suriname
- Coordinates: 4°0′5″N 55°28′11″W
- Country: Suriname
- District: Sipaliwini District
- Resort: Boven Suriname
- Time zone: UTC-3 (AST)

Asidonhopo (Eastern Maroon Creole: Asidonopo) is a Saramaka village on the Pikin Rio, shortly before the confluence at the Upper Suriname River in the Sipaliwini District of Suriname. Asidonhopo is the residence of the paramount chief or gaanman of the Saramaca. The succession of gaanman Belfon Aboikoni, who died in June 2014, has not been decided as of 2018. There are three candidates, but no agreement between the clans. The decision was forwarded to President Dési Bouterse, however he decided that the clans have to reach a compromise themselves.
