= Grutterink Mountains =

Mountain range in Suriname

- Location within Suriname

Highest point
- Elevation: 156 m (512 ft)
- Coordinates: 3°45′N 54°40′W

Geography
- Country: Suriname

The Grutterink Mountains (Dutch: Grutterinkgebergte) is a mountain range in the Sipaliwini District of Suriname. It is named after Jan Adolf Grutterink.
