= Kajana Sign Language =

Deaf sign language of Suriname

- Native to: Suriname
- Region: Kajana
- Native speakers: unknown number of 200 inhabitants in the community (no date)
- Language family: village sign

Language codes
- ISO 639-3: None (mis)
- Glottolog: kaja1257

Kajana Sign Language (Dutch: Kajana Gebarentaal) is a village sign language of Suriname. It is spoken in Kajana, a village of just three families.
