= Boven Suriname =

Coordinates: 3.9669°N 55.5751°W

- Resort
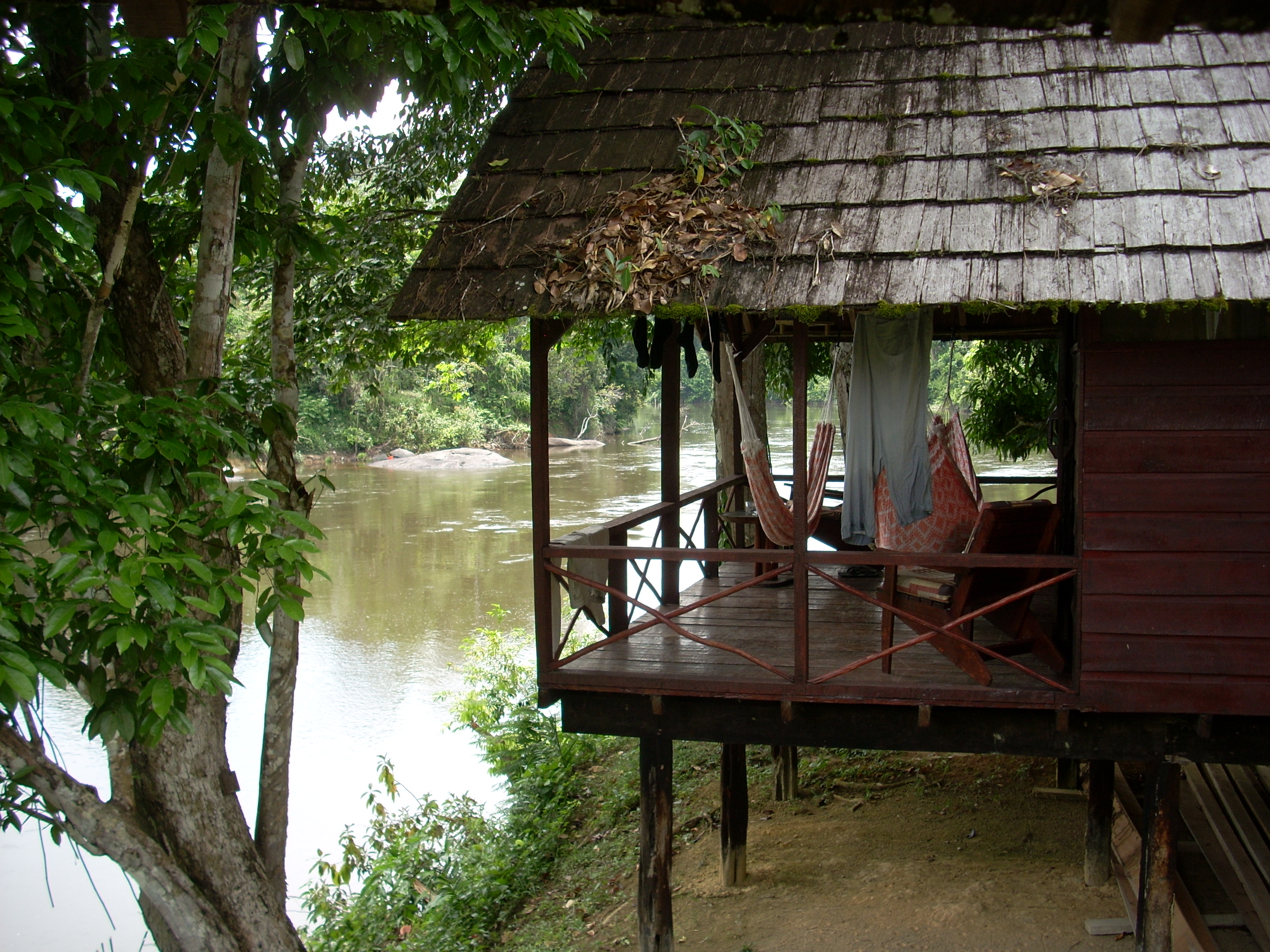
- Cottage in Awarradam

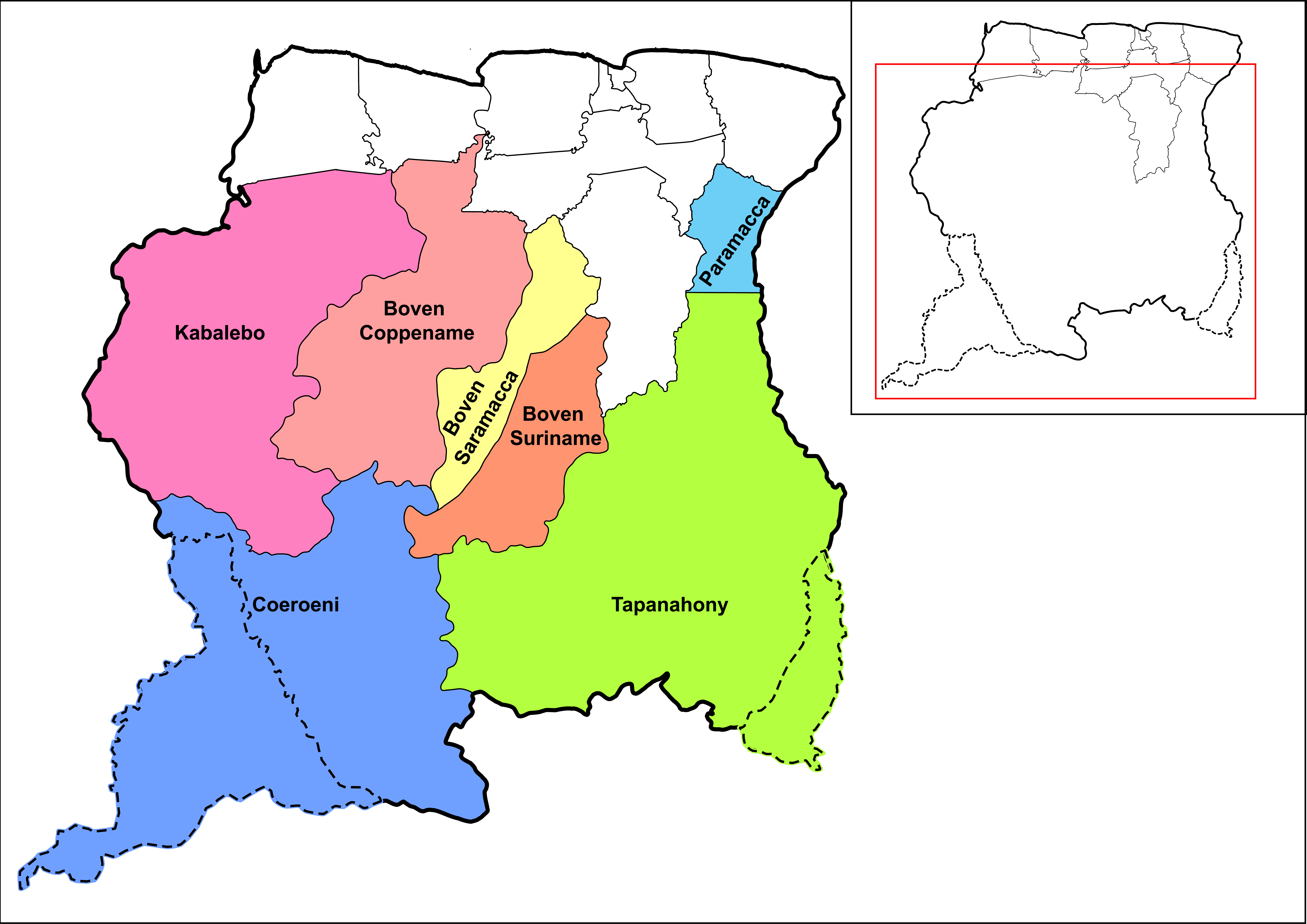
- Map showing the resorts of Sipaliwini District. Boven Suriname
- Country: Suriname
- District: Sipaliwini District

Area
  - Total: 7,512 km^{2} (2,900 sq mi)

Population (2012)
  - Total: 17,954
  - Density: 2.390/km^{2} (6.190/sq mi)
- Time zone: UTC-3 (AST)

Boven Suriname (also Upper Suriname) is a resort in Suriname, located in the Sipaliwini District. Its population at the 2012 census was 17,954. Almost its entire population consists of Maroons.

The resort is home to many small tribal villages. The main village is Pokigron. Pokigron is located at the end of a paved road via Brownsweg to the Avobakaweg, Villages to the south of Pokigron can only be accessed by boat. The settlements on the right bank of the Upper Suriname River are usually adherents to the Winti (Afro-Surinamese) religion, while the left bank is mainly Christian.

Aurora can also be accessed from the Laduani Airstrip. Botopasi, Djumu, Goddo, and Pikin Slee are served by the Botopasi Airstrip. Kajana is served by the Cayana Airstrip.

Even though Boven Suriname had long been settled by the Maroons, it wasn't until 1908 that an expedition led by Johan Eilerts de Haan set out to find the source of the Suriname River.

== Villages ==
- Abenaston
- Asidonhopo
- Aurora
- Botopasi
- Djumu
- Goddo
- Jaw Jaw
- Kajana
- Pikin Slee
- Pokigron
- Wittikamba
