= Nieuw-Lombe =

Nieuw-Lombe Njun-Lombe (Saramaccan)
- Village
- Location within Suriname
- Coordinates: 5°10′32″N 55°04′3″W
- Country: Suriname
- District: Brokopondo District
- Resort: Klaaskreek

Population (2017)
  - Total: 430
- Time zone: UTC-3 (AST)

Nieuw-Lombe (Saramaccan: Njun-Lombe), also spelt Nieuw-Lombé, is a village in the resort of Klaaskreek in the Brokopondo District of Suriname. The village is located on the Suriname River, and is inhabited by Saramaka maroons. Nieuw-Lombe is a transmigration village built for the inhabitants of Lombé which was flooded by the Brokopondo Reservoir after the construction of the Afobaka Dam.

== History ==
The transmigration village of Nieuw-Lombe was founded in 1964, because the village of Lombe was going to be flooded by the Brokopondo Reservoir. The original village had a population of 343 people. Nieuw-Lombe was constructed on the former plantation Remoncourt. Part of the population was resettled in Jaw Jaw. The village of Moejekriki was established close to Nieuw-Lombe for the people of its eponymous predecessor, and has since then formed a single urban area with Nieuw-Lombe. About half the houses in the villages were built during the transmigration; the remainder are newer additions.

== Overview ==
Nieuw-Lombe contains a school and a medical centre. It has access to the electricity grid. The village is located at the other side of the Suriname River, and there is no bridge. A public free ferry is provided, but for passengers only, and cars have to use a private service.

The main employers of the village are Rosebel gold mine, the government, and the logging industry. The local football club is ACoconut F.C., but is intended for all the villages of the Brokopondo District.
