= Knopaiamoi =

Mountain in Suriname

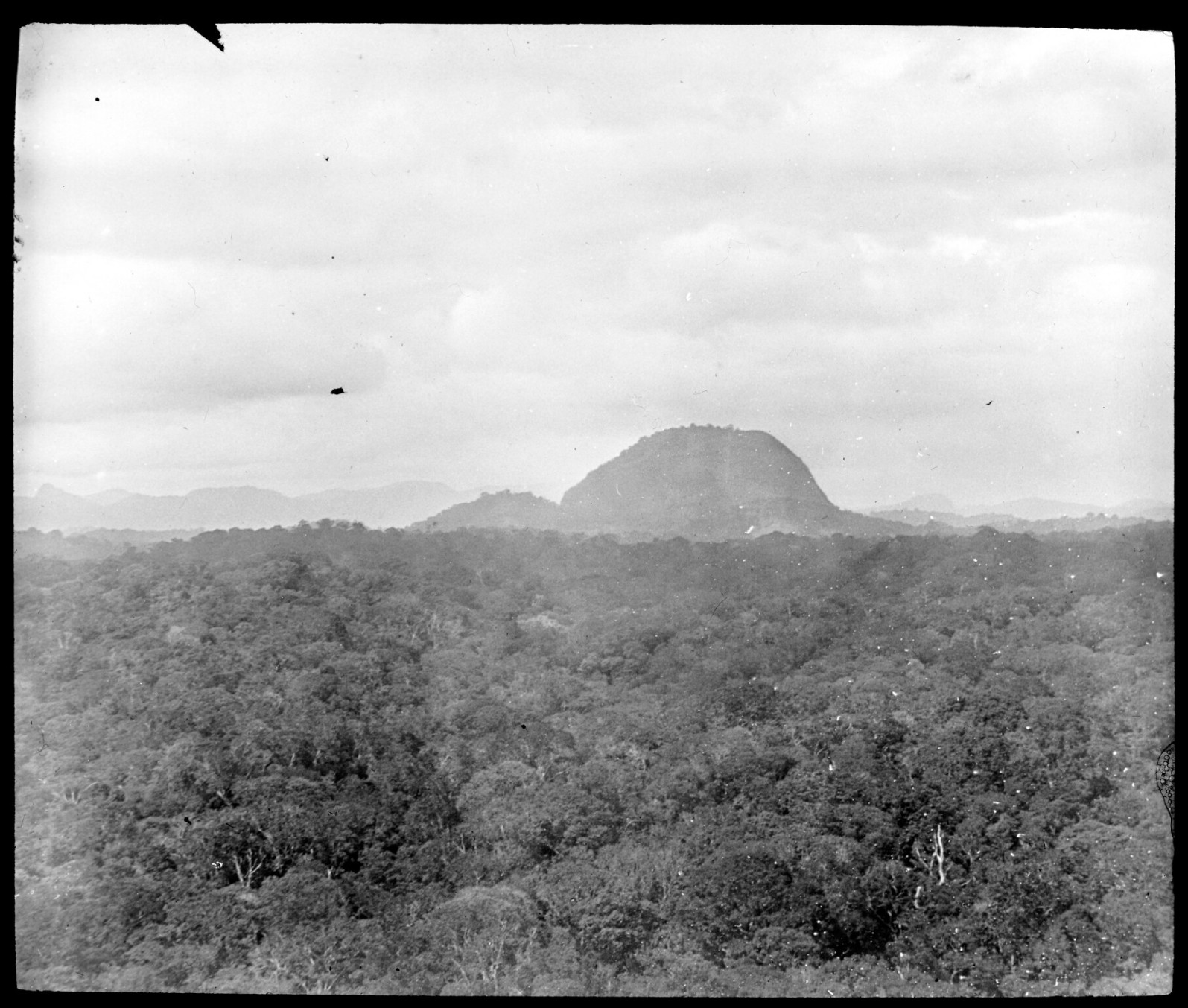
- Knopaiamoi as photographed during the Gonini expedition of 1903

Highest point
- Elevation: 504 m (1,654 ft)
- Coordinates: 2°27′58″N 54°30′16″W

Geography
- Location within Suriname
- Location: Sipaliwini District, Suriname
- Parent range: Tumuk Humak Mountains

Knopaiamoi (Wayana: Konopamïi, Aluku: Konopu amoï) is a mountain in Suriname at 504 metres (1,654 ft). It is part of the Tumuk Humak Mountains and is located in the Sipaliwini District. The mountain is located in the South-eastern corner of Suriname near the borders with French Guiana and Brazil. It was discovered in 1861 by a joint French-Dutch border expedition and originally named Piton Vidal after Gomer Vidal, the leader of the French delegation of the expedition. At first they failed to climb the mountain, and most of the team went on, however Vidal and Keppler stayed behind to give it a second chance.

== Name ==
According to oral tradition, the original Wayana name for the mountain was Tëpuenetop, which has since been replaced by Konopamïi, deriving from the Aluku name Konopu amoï, which means "beautiful button".
