= Upper Suriname River =

Upper Suriname Rivier
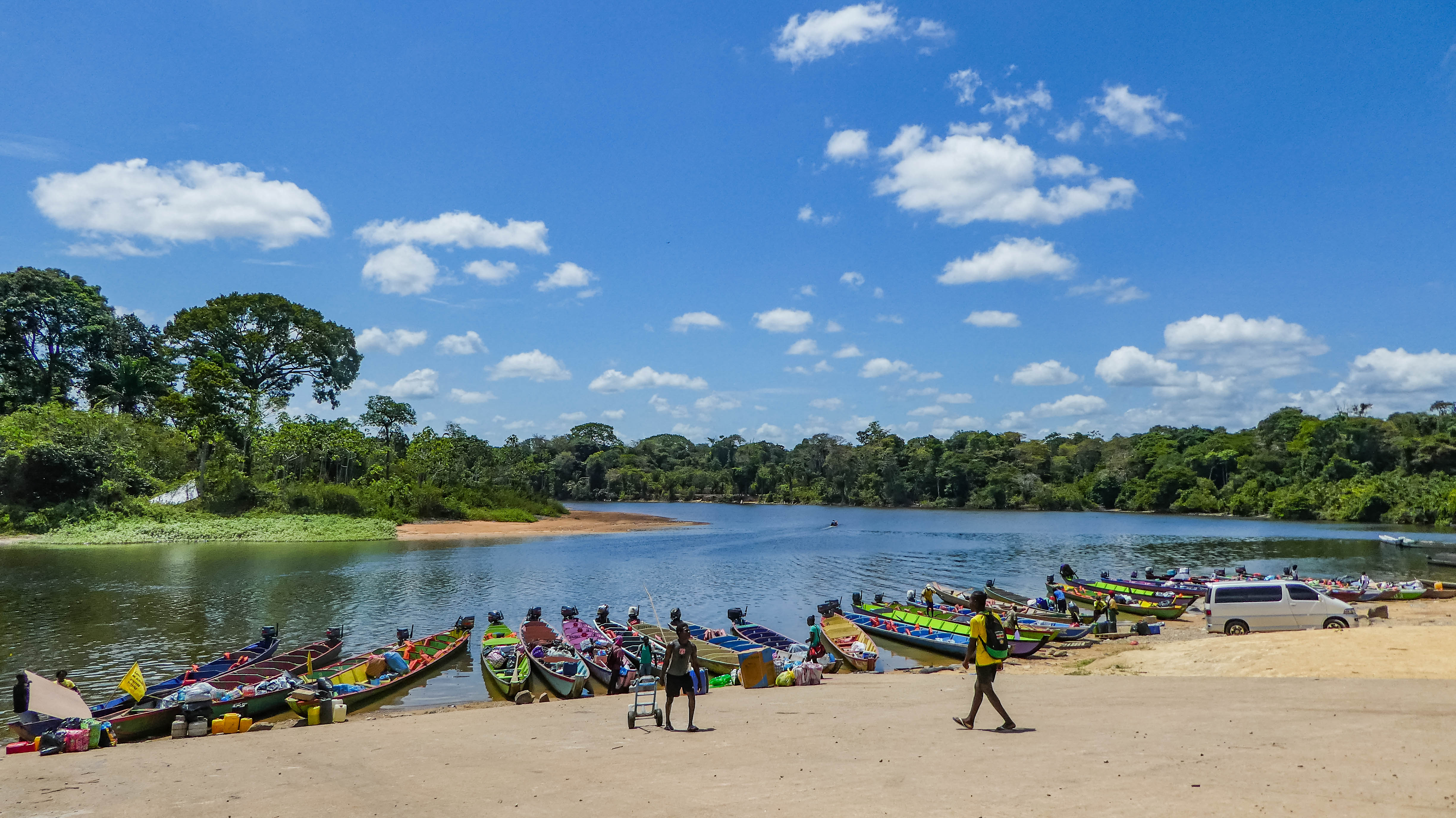
- Jetty of Atjoni, near Pokigron
- Native name: Boven-Surinamerivier (Dutch)

Physical characteristics
- Source: Gran Rio and Pikin Rio
  - coordinates: 4°0′49″N 55°28′36″W
- Mouth: Lower Suriname River
  - location: Between the town of Brokopondo and the reservoir
  - coordinates: 5°1′2.2″N 54°58′57.6″W

The Upper Suriname River is the upper reach of the Suriname River. Shortly behind the beginning to the Lower Suriname River, there is the Brokopondo Reservoir. From there, the access by road ends at the jetty of Atjoni, near Pokigron. The Suriname River begins at the confluence of the Gran Rio and Pikin Rio near the village of Goddo with the Tapawatrasula rapids.

== Brokopondo Reservoir ==
Just before the transition of the Upper to the Lower Suriname River is the Brokopondo Reservoir, which was constructed by the closure of the Afobaka Dam on February 1, 1964, for energy generation for the production of aluminium and aluminium oxide.

== Watershed ==
The Upper Suriname River starts at the confluence of the Gran Rio and Pikin Rio near the village of Goddo. The villages of Djumu and Soolan, and the Tapawatrasula rapids, are located in the immediate vicinity. The Gran Rio receives water mainly from the Franssen Herderschee Peek, while the Pikin Rio also receives water from the Herderschee Peek and the Pineapple Mountain (Ananasberg).

Between Goddo and the confluence at the Brokopondo Reservoir, the following rapids (sulas) can be found, sometimes named after nearby villages: Toni, Bofokule, Dahome, Heikununu, Bia-ati, Vedubuka, Jin Jin, Apresina, and Bakaabooto. The Upper Suriname River has a watershed area of 16,500 square kilometers (it is not clear if this includes the Gran Rio).

== Saramaccan area ==
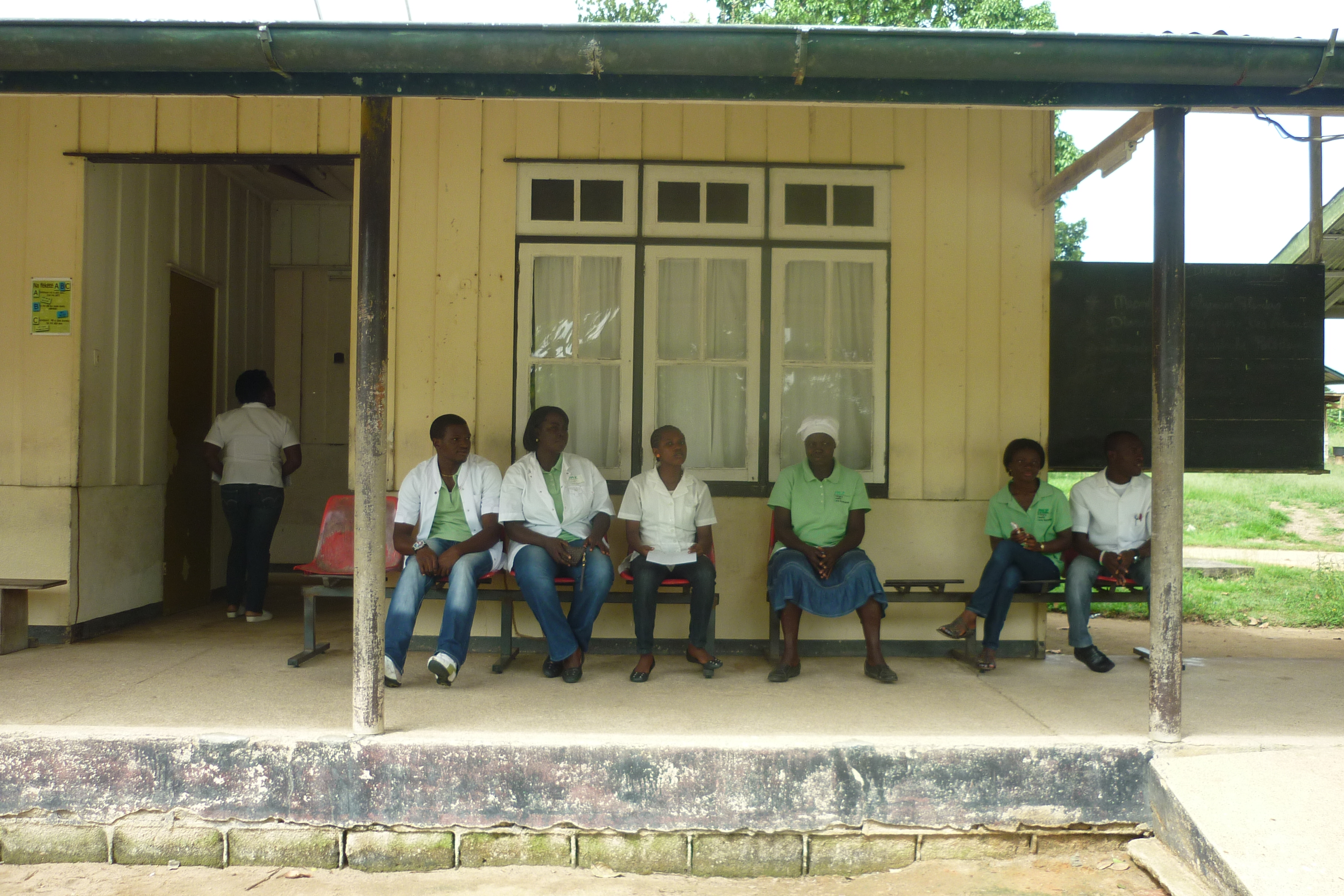
Medical station of Laduani

This area is home to Saramaccan Maroons. During the slavery period, they managed to escape from plantations and settled in this region. In addition, Saramaccan villages are located along the Saramacca River. Long before the abolition of slavery (1863) and independence (1975), the colonial government signed a peace treaty with the Saramaccans (1762), allowing the people to govern their own affairs.

Due to its location in the jungle, isolated from the rest of the world, the area has experienced a persistent lag in development, which continues into the early 21st century. Another characteristic of this centuries-long isolation is the presence of a homogeneous Saramaccan population that has had little intermingling with people from outside.

Poverty and a lack of prospects for a better situation have led to significant migration, especially to Paramaribo. In some villages, men are often away from home for work in Paramaribo, the gold fields or French Guiana. Women are therefore greatly left behind there.

== Accessibility ==
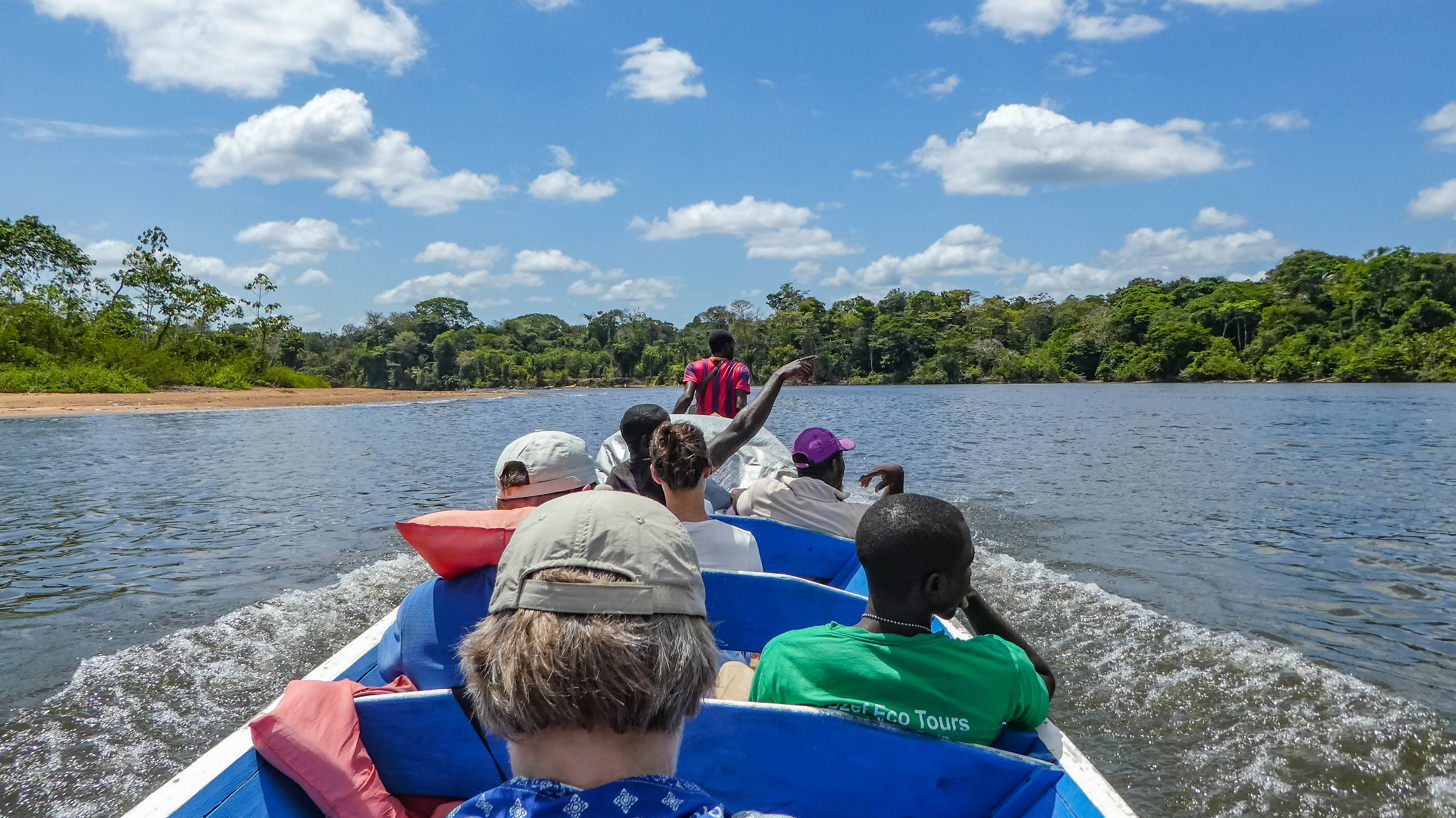
Most transport between the villages is per dugout canoe

The Afobaka Road connects North Suriname with several villages on the northern banks of the Upper Suriname, particularly Pokigron, which is connected to the Atjoni jetty where boats depart for the villages along the river. In the early 2010s, there were plans to extend the Afobaka Road to Djumu, at the source of the Upper Suriname, which would enable all intermediate villages to be reached by road. However, this road has not been constructed (as of 2023). There is also access via the road to Danta Bai and Bakaabooto, near the reservoir, through a junction branching off from the Afobaka Road.

There are airstrips for small planes and helicopters at Laduani, Botopasi, Djumu, and further along the Gran Rio at Kajana. Medical assistance in the area is provided by the Medische Zending (Medical Mission). Medical posts are located upstream in Pokigron, Jawjaw, Laduani, Goejaba, Debikè, Kambaloea, Heikoenoenoe, Semoisi, Djoemoe, and along the Gran Rio in Cajana.

== Tourism ==
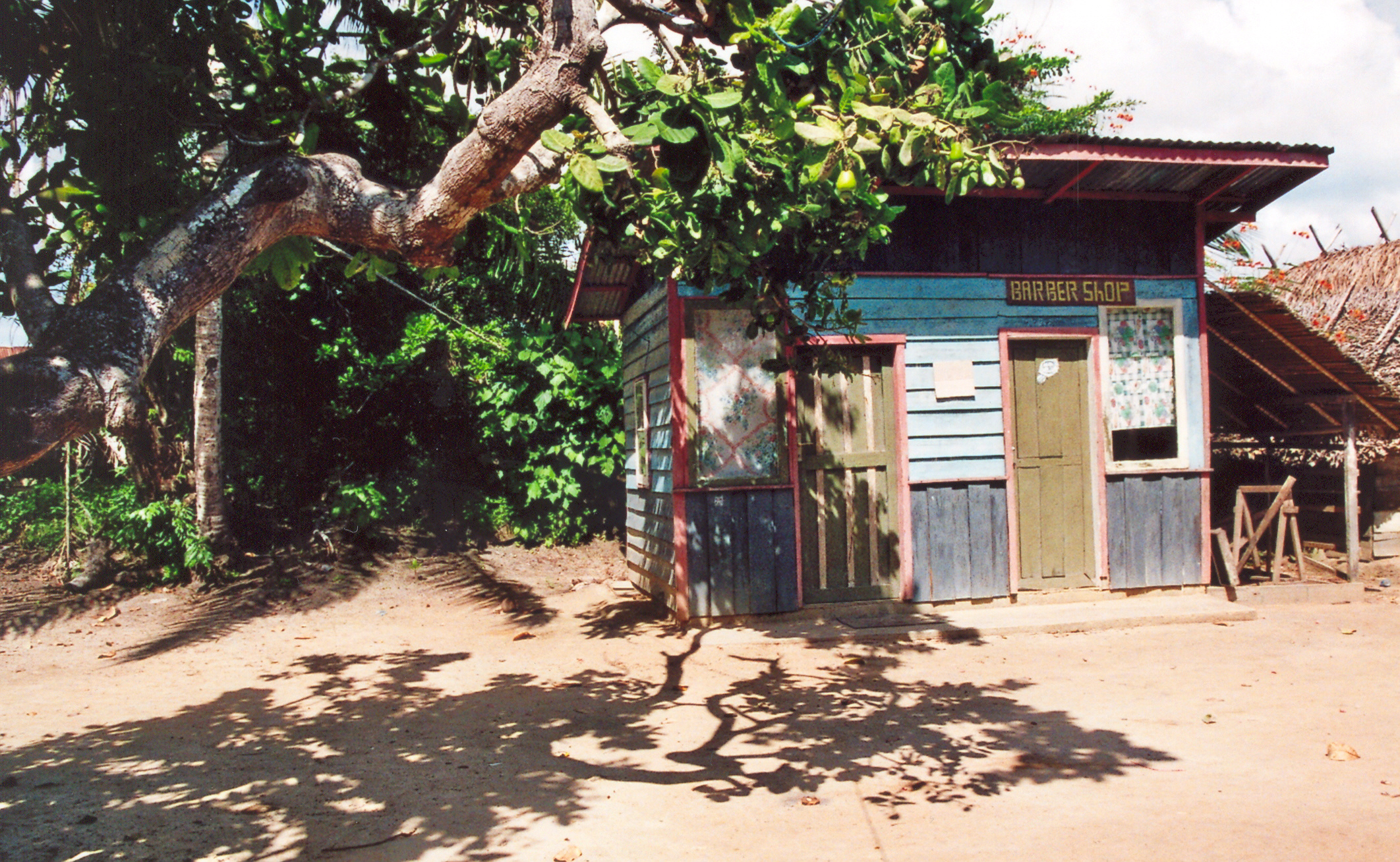
Hair salon in Botopasi

The area is frequented by tourists, both from abroad and Suriname proper. The main activities include relaxation, jungle hiking, wildlife spotting, swimming, fishing, visiting villages, interacting with the local population, and experiencing a different culture.

Pikin Slee is home to the Saamaka Maroon Museum, which focuses on the cultural history of the area.

Along the river, there are few hills suitable for day hikes to observe the panoramic views. However, beyond Goddo, there are two such hills: Oko Mountain (Okoberg), a three-hour hike from Cajana (Gran Rio), and the Pineaplle Mountain (Ananasberg), a hike of an hour and a half from Bendekondre (Pikin Rio).

== Map ==
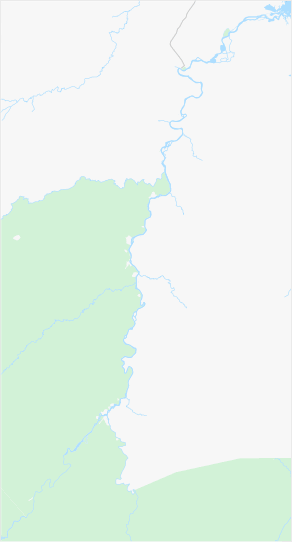
Upper Suriname River (with the headwaters Gran Rio and Pikin Rio)
