= Botopasi =

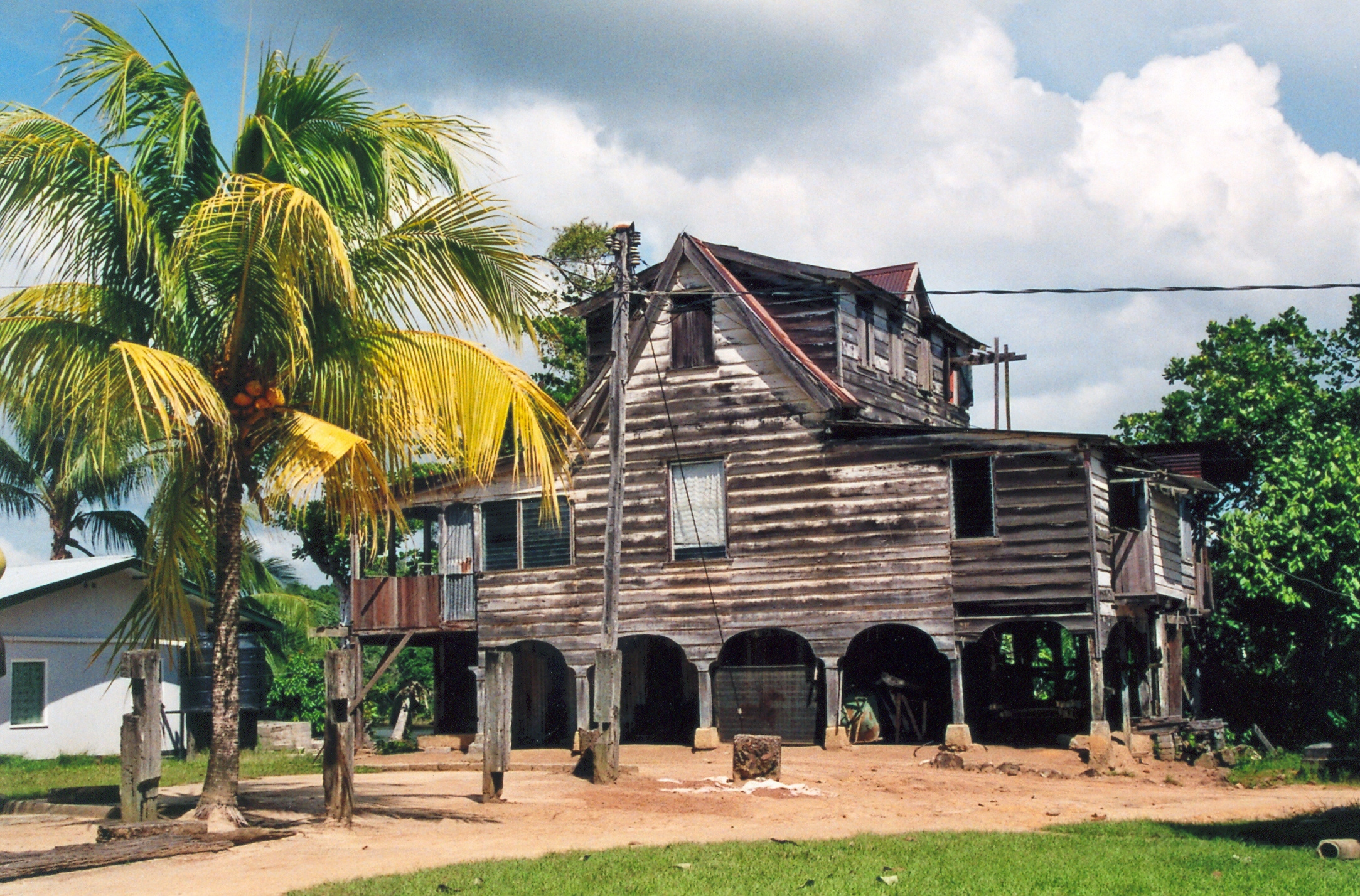
- House in Botopasi

- Location in Suriname
- Coordinates: 4°13′14″N 55°26′37″W
- Country: Suriname
- District: Sipaliwini District
- Resort: Boven Suriname

Population (2001)
  - Total: ~740

Botopasi, also spelled Boto-Pasi, is a Saamaka village in Suriname. The village had a population of about 740 people in 2001.

The villages has a school, clinic and a church. The resources of the village are shared with the nearby village of Debiki. A holiday resort is located near by.

Botopasi is a village on the Suriname River, reachable by boat from Pokigron which is the end of the road. Villages to the south of Pokigron can only be accessed by boat. Near the village is the Botopasi Airstrip.
