= Aurora, Suriname =

Aurora
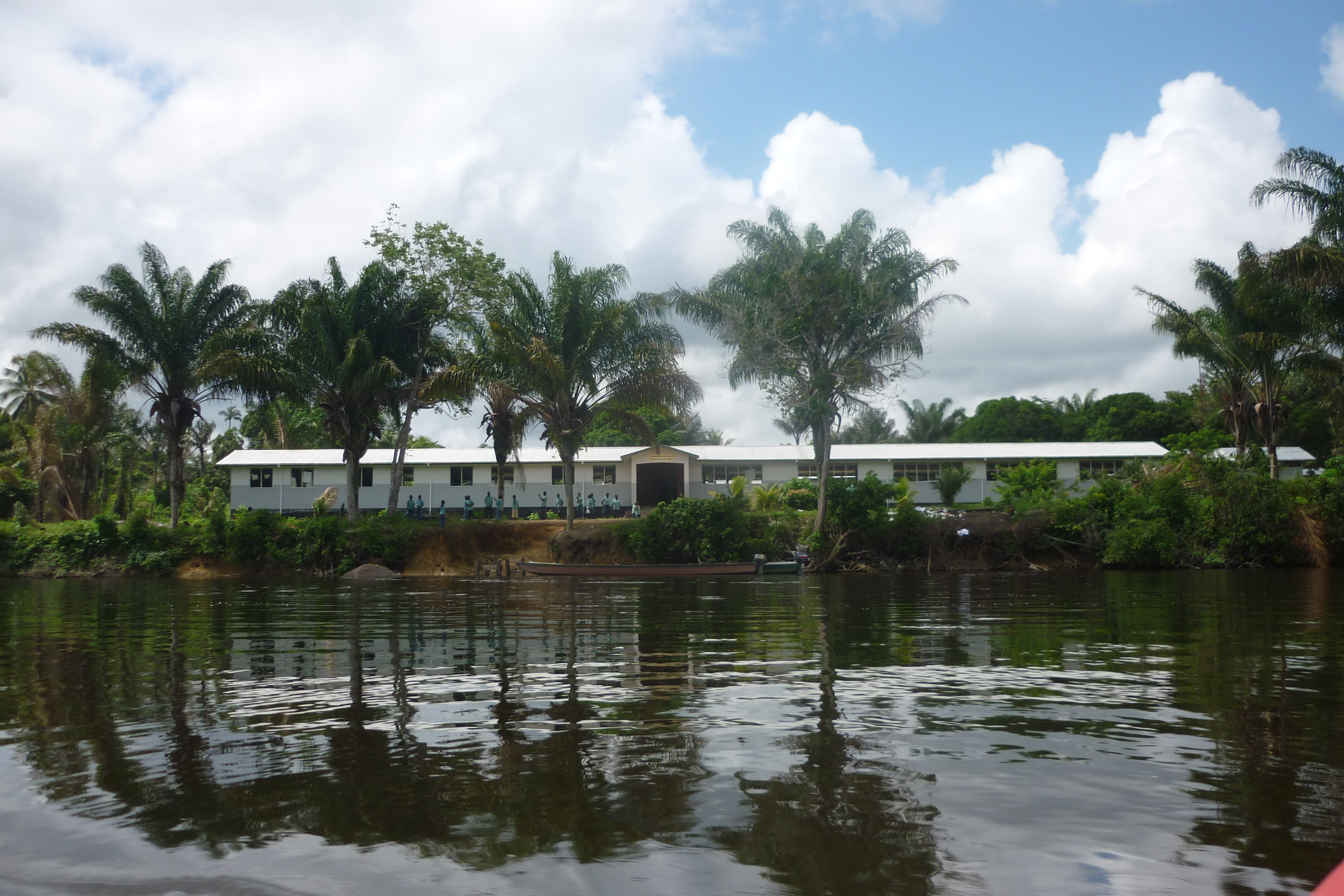
- School in Aurora

- Location in Suriname
- Coordinates: 4°22′14″N 55°23′59″W
- Country: Suriname
- District: Sipaliwini District
- Resort (municipality): Boven Suriname

Population
  - Total: ~6,000

Aurora is a town in the Sipaliwini District of Suriname on the Upper Suriname River. Aurora is a tribal village, and has a twin village called Nieuw Aurora which was built as an extension. The village is home to Maroons of the Saramaka tribe.

The school in Nieuw Aurora made the headlines in 2017, because it had a perfect graduation level of 100%.

Aurora can be accessed by boat from Pokigron, or from the Laduani Airstrip.

== Laduani ==
Laduani, also spelled as Ladoani, is a little village next to Aurora. The health care centre, and airport for Aurora are located in Laduani.
