= Suriname River =

River in Suriname

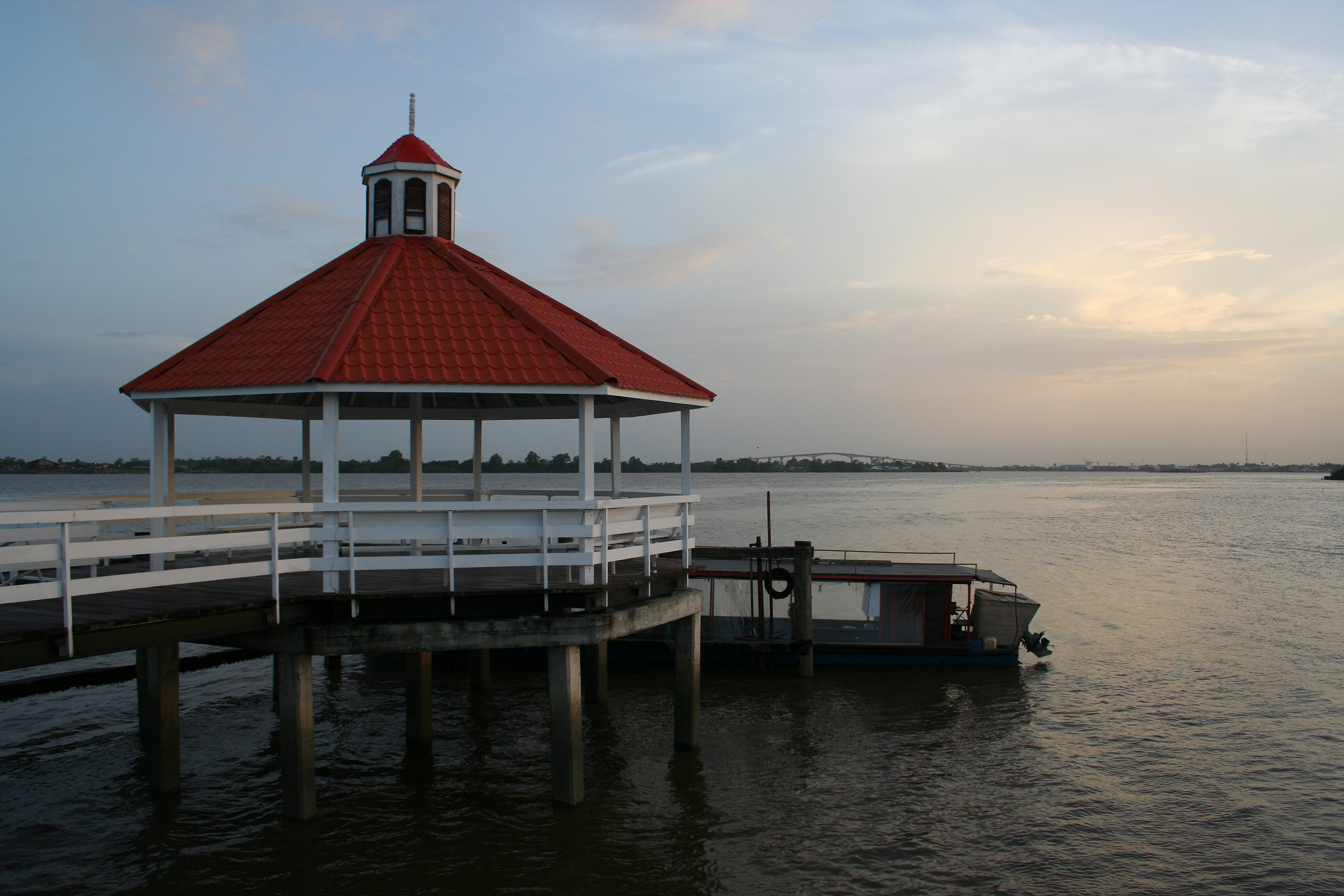

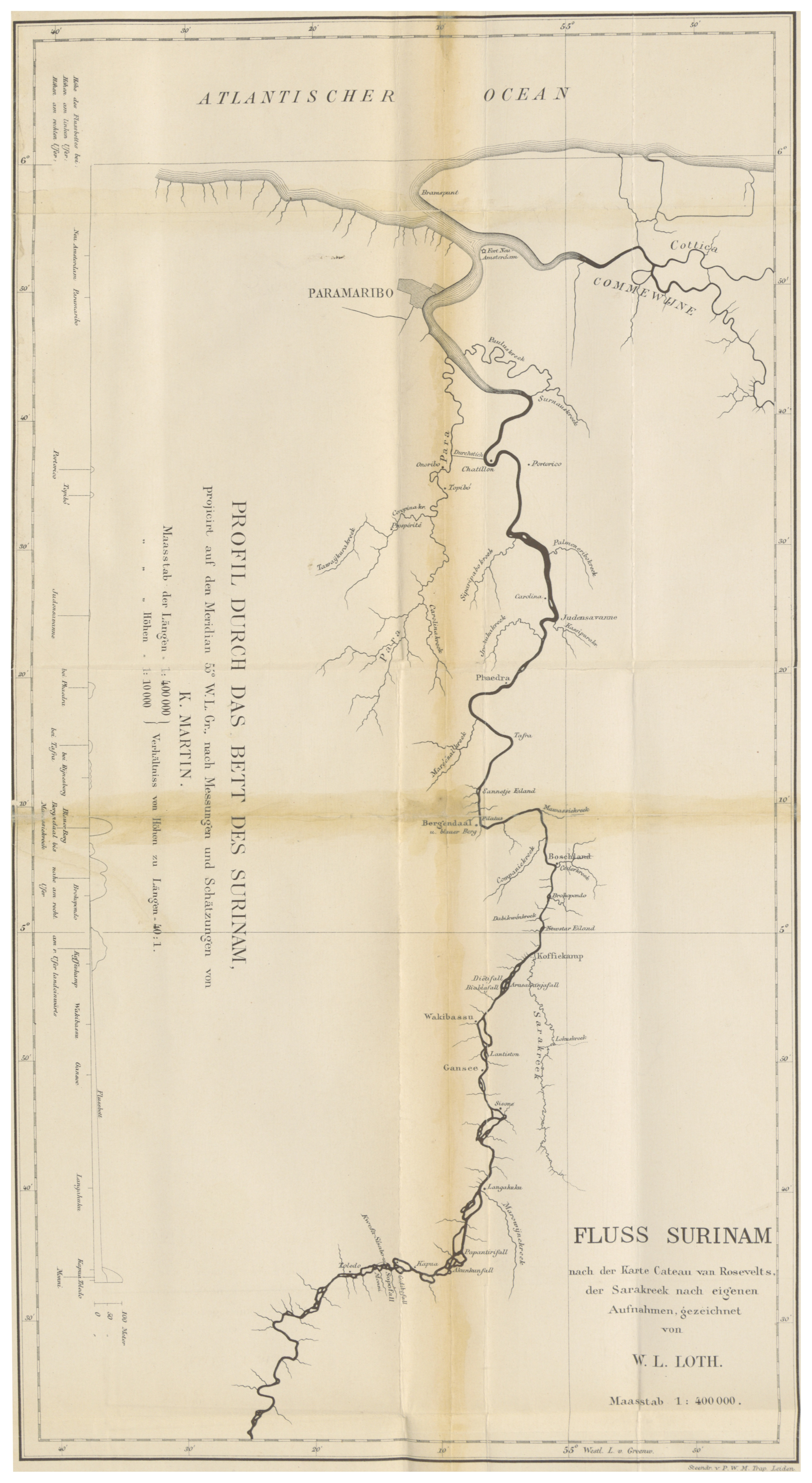
- Map of the Suriname River (1887)

- Location within Suriname

Location
- Country: Suriname

Physical characteristics
- Source: Gran Rio and Pikin Rio
  - coordinates: 4°0′49″N 55°28′36″W
- Mouth: Atlantic Ocean
  - location: Paramaribo
  - coordinates: 5°55′30″N 55°10′15″W
  - elevation: 0 m (0 ft)
- Length: 480 km (300 mi)
- Basin size: 16,500 km^{2} (6,400 sq mi)
- Discharge
  - average: 426 m^{3}/s (15,000 cu ft/s)
  - minimum: 20 m^{3}/s (710 cu ft/s)
  - maximum: 4,000 m^{3}/s (140,000 cu ft/s)

Basin features
- Waterbodies: Brokopondo Reservoir

The Suriname River (Dutch: Surinamerivier) is 480 kilometres (300 mi) long and flows through the country of Suriname. Its sources are located in the Guiana Highlands on the border between the Wilhelmina Mountains and the Eilerts de Haan Mountains (where it is known as the Gran Rio). The source of the Upper Suriname River is at the confluence of the Gran Rio and Pikin Rio near the village of Goddo. The river continues shortly after the reservoir along Brokopondo as the Lower Suriname River. Then it flows Berg en Dal, the migrant communities Klaaskreek and Nieuw-Lombé, Jodensavanne, Carolina, Ornamibo and Domburg, before reaching the capital Paramaribo on the left bank and Meerzorg on the right bank. At Nieuw-Amsterdam it is joined by the Commewijne and immediately thereafter at the sandspit Braamspunt it flows into the Atlantic Ocean.

The river has several sets of rapids as well as a few dams, the largest of which is the Afobaka Dam. The river's flow is interrupted by the Brokopondo Reservoir, which therefore divides the river into two sections. The upstream section runs almost entirely through the Sipaliwini district, and the downstream section runs through the Brokopondo, Para, Commewijne, Wanica and Paramaribo districts.

== Etymology ==
The name Suriname may derive from an indigenous people called Surinen, who inhabited the area at the time of European contact.

The earliest European sources give variants of "Suriname" as the name of the river. Lawrence Kemys wrote in his Relation of the Second Voyage to Guiana of passing a river called "Shurinama". In 1598, a fleet of three Dutch ships visiting the Wild Coast mention passing the river "Surinamo". In 1617, a Dutch notary spelled the name of the river on which a Dutch trading post had existed three years earlier as "Surrenant". The Dutch navigator David Pietersz. de Vries wrote of traveling up the "Sername" river in 1634 until he encountered the English colony there; the terminal vowel remained in future Dutch spellings and pronunciations. In 1640, a Spanish manuscript entitled "General Description of All His Majesty's Dominions in America" called the river "Soronama". In 1653, instructions given to a British fleet sailing to meet Lord Willoughby in Barbados, which at the time was the seat of English colonial government in the region, spelled the name of the colony "Surinam"; this would remain the standard spelling in English. A 1663 royal charter said the region around the river was "called Serrinam also Surrinam".

== Navigation ==
For import and export, the Suriname is by far the most important river in the country. Not only do all vessels carrying bauxite, aluminum oxide and aluminum depart from Suriname via the river, nearly all vessels carrying materials vital for Suriname enter the country at Braamspunt in order to offload their cargoes in the harbours of Paramaribo (immediately south of the city centre), or the harbours of Smalkalden and Paranam – approximately 30 km from Paramaribo – which are vital for the aluminum industry. During the Second World War, the 6,000 tonne North German Lloyd cargo ship Goslar was scuttled in the Suriname in order to prevent it from falling into Allied hands. The wreck has never been removed and remains visible in the middle of the river.

== Bridges ==
In 2000, the Jules Wijdenbosch Bridge at Paramaribo was officially opened by the President, who had commissioned construction of the bridge and after whom it is named. The bridge permits access to the eastern part of the country. At Carolina, approximately 50 km south of Paramaribo, a wooden bridge crosses the river.

== Recreation ==
Near Domburg, an artificial white sand beach has been created along the Suriname River. The adjoining strip of water has been protected with nets to allow swimming in the piranha-infested waters. As a result of this and associated recreation facilities, White Beach is a popular weekend destination.

== Gallery ==
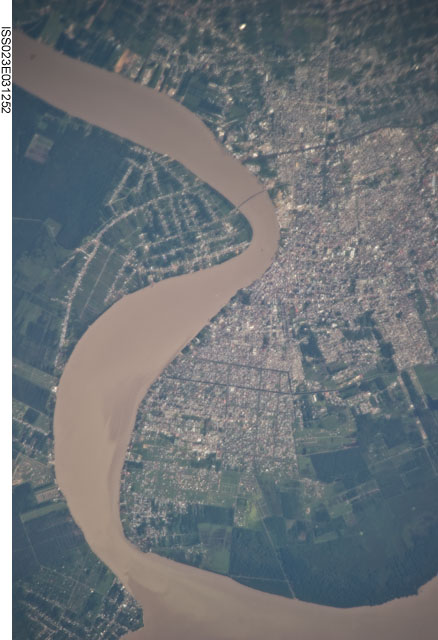
Mouth of the Suriname River at Paramaribo

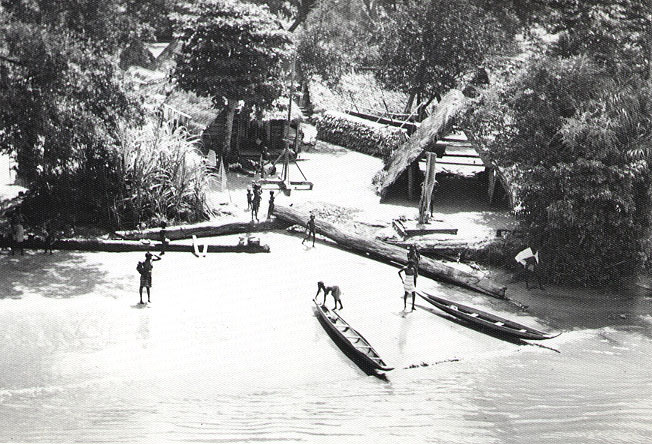
Dugout canoes at Maroon village, Suriname River, 1955

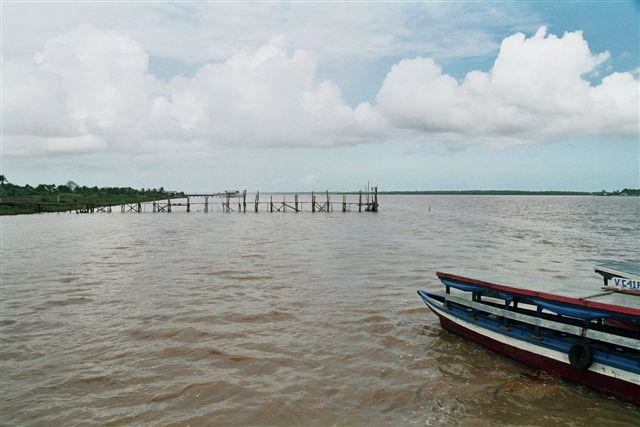
Suriname River at Leonsberg, Paramaribo

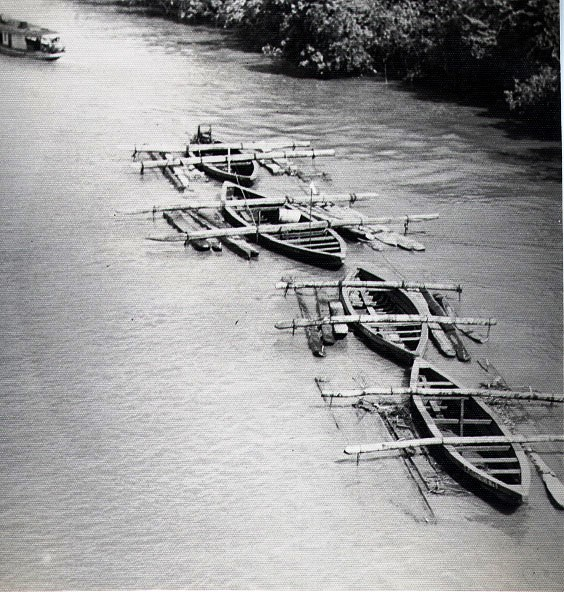
Hardwood logs transported down Suriname River in 1955

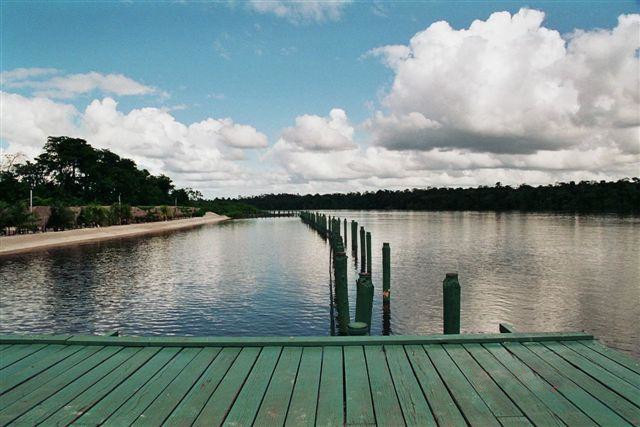
Looking downstream at White Beach

== Notes ==
- Translated from Suriname (rivier) article on the Dutch Wikipedia, version on 24 April 2006
