= Sipaliwini District =

District of Suriname

Sipaliwini
- District
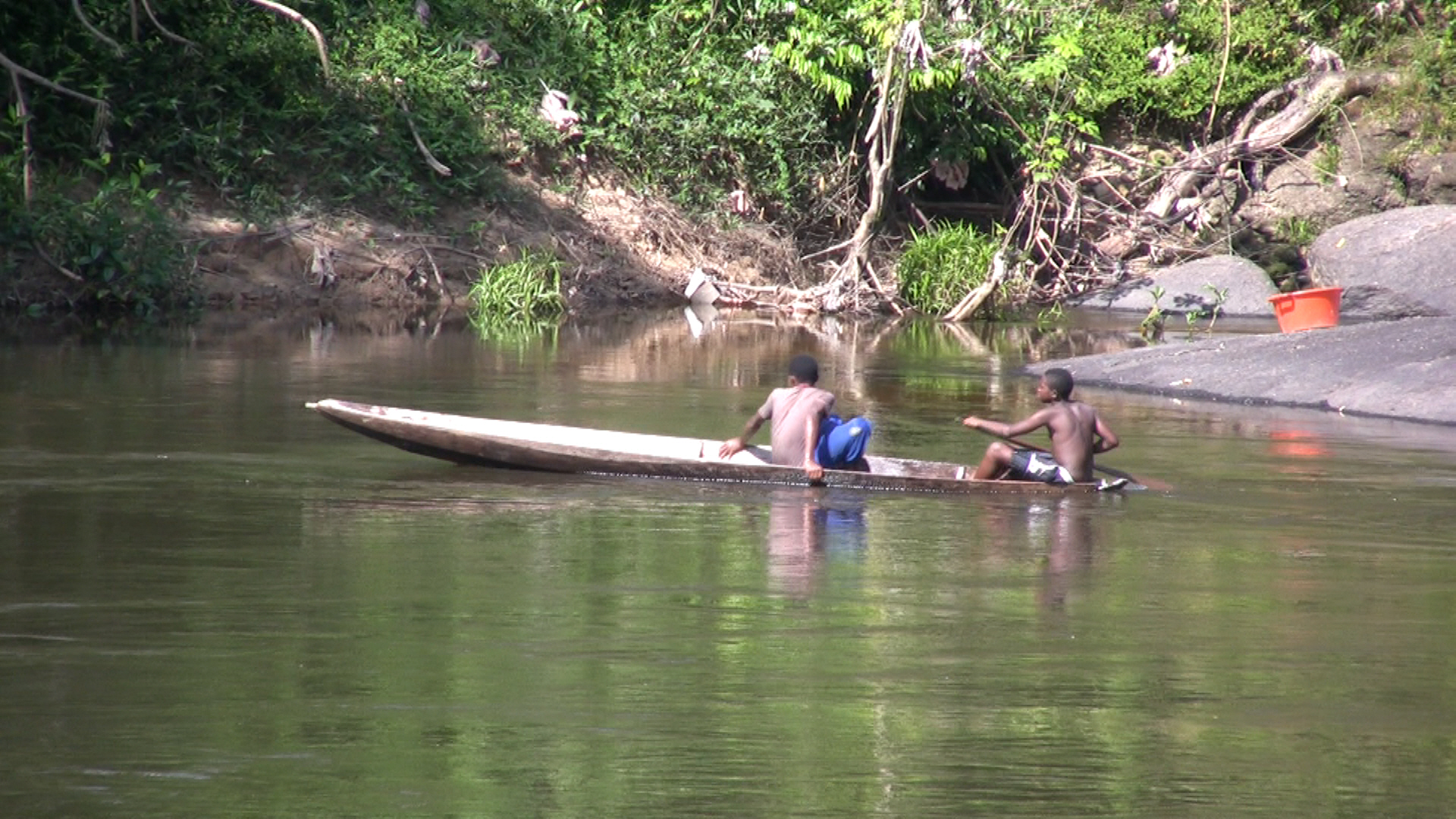
- Boys in a canoe on the Gran Rio river

- Sipaliwini district in Suriname.
- Coordinates: 3°47′N 56°02′W
- Country: Suriname

Area
  - Total: 130,567 km^{2} (50,412 sq mi)

Population (2012 census)
  - Total: 37,065
  - Density: 0.28388/km^{2} (0.73524/sq mi)
- Time zone: UTC-3

Sipaliwini is the largest district of Suriname, located in the south. Sipaliwini is the only district that does not have a regional capital, as it is directly administered by the national government in Paramaribo. Sipaliwini District includes disputed areas, with the southwestern region controlled and administered by Guyana, whereas the southeastern region is controlled by French Guiana, an overseas department of France.

== History ==
Sipaliwini was created in 1983 and has a population of 37,065 and an area of 130,567 km^{2} (50,412 sq mi). The district is nearly 4 times as large as the other 9 districts of Suriname combined; however, most of Sipaliwini is almost completely covered by rainforest. To create the district, the Nickerie District was reduced from around 65,000 km^{2} (25,000 sq mi) to 5,000 km^{2} (1,900 sq mi). Sipaliwini is the tribal area inhabited by Maroons and indigenous people. Various peace treaties starting in 1686 had recognised autonomy for the tribes over their own area; however, a specific delineation of the tribal area had been lacking. The name is of Indigenous origin, referring to the Sipaliwini River, and means "river of stones or rocks".

It is thought by archaeologists that hunter-gatherers lived in what is today Sipaliwini district during the Paleolithic period. The region was largely left alone during the colonial period, as the Dutch that controlled Suriname were fearful of the Portuguese in Brazil, and it was not until the 20th century that development projects began.

As of 2004, there were 41 schools in the areas. An increase in schools is planned, because some children have to travel long distances by foot or boat to neighbouring villages. As of 2004, there are 24 clinics in the district. Medical care is provided by Medische Zending. In the 1950s, Operation Grasshopper established many tiny airstrips in the district in order to make the territory accessible.

The Sipaliwini district had seen occasional fighting in the late 1960s between Guyanese and Surinamese troops over border disputes in the south-west Tigri Area of the Coeroeni resort.

== Nature ==
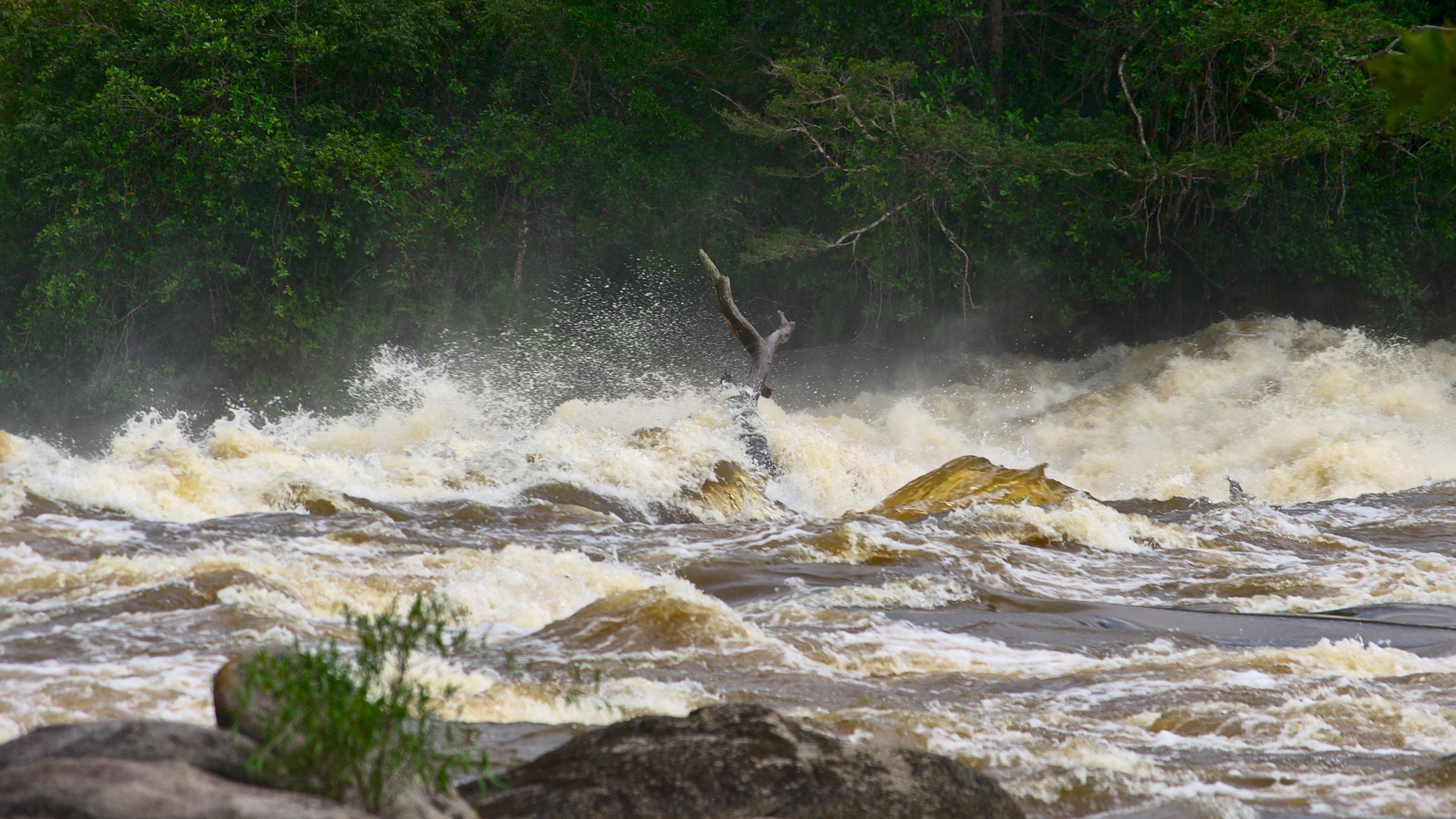
Rapids in the Tapanahony River

Sipaliwini consists of large areas of tropical rain forests, mountains, and savannas. In 1998, the Central Suriname Nature Reserve was created by Conservation International and the government of Suriname from the fusion of three existing nature reserves: Ralleighvallen, Tafelberg and Eilerts de Haangebergte. It was designated a UNESCO World Heritage Site in 2000 for its pristine tropical rainforest ecosystem. It is known for its rapids and bird species, including the Guiana Cock of the Rock (Rupicola rupicola). Over 5,000 different plants have been identified, and large mammals like the jaguar, giant armadillo, and eight species of primates. A research station is located at the foot of Voltzberg and the area is tourist attraction.

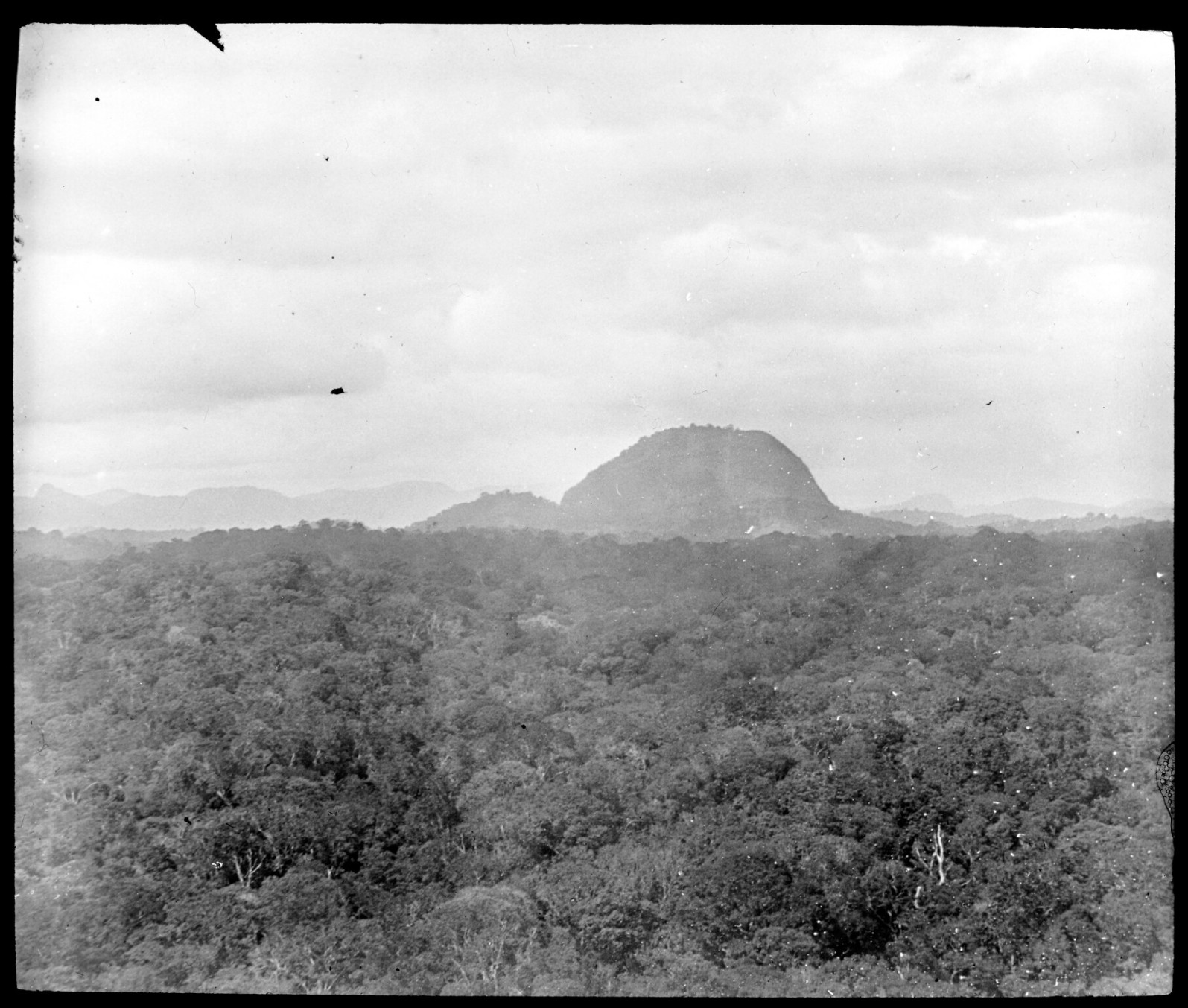
Knopaiamoi, one of the Tumuk Humak Mountains

The Sipaliwini Savanna Nature Reserve has been established in 1972, and is 1,000 km^{2} (390 sq mi) of savannah, and the second largest in Suriname. The reserve is near pristine and offers a wide variety in flora and fauna.

The Tumuk Humak Mountains are located in the southeastern part of the district, along the border with French Guiana.

== Administration ==
Until 2011, Sipaliwini was administered by one district commissioner residing in Paramaribo. In the years since, district commissioners have been appointed for each separate resort.

=== Resorts ===
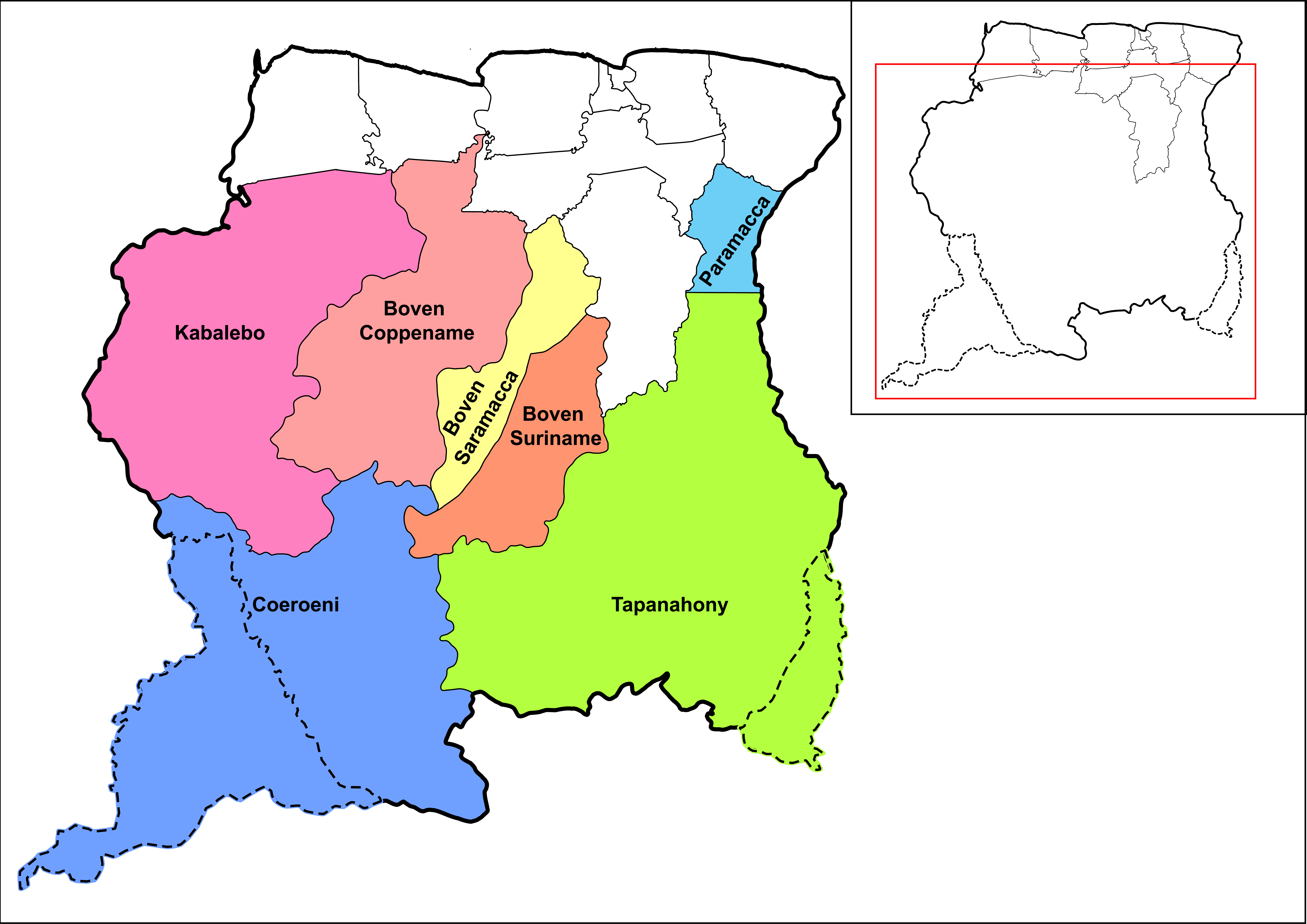
Resorts of Sipaliwini

Sipaliwini is divided into 7 resorts (ressorten):

District	District Commissioner	Serving since	Main tribes
Boven Coppename	Walter Bonjaski	2020	Kwinti and Tiriyó
Boven Saramacca	Erwin Linga	2020	Matawai
Boven Suriname	Frits Dinge	2020	Saamaka
Coeroeni	Merilu Sapa	2020	Tiriyó
Kabalebo	Josta Lewis	2020	Arawak and Warao
Paramacca	Osei Jabini	2020	Paramacca
Tapanahony	Henk Deel	2021	Ndyuka

== Villages ==
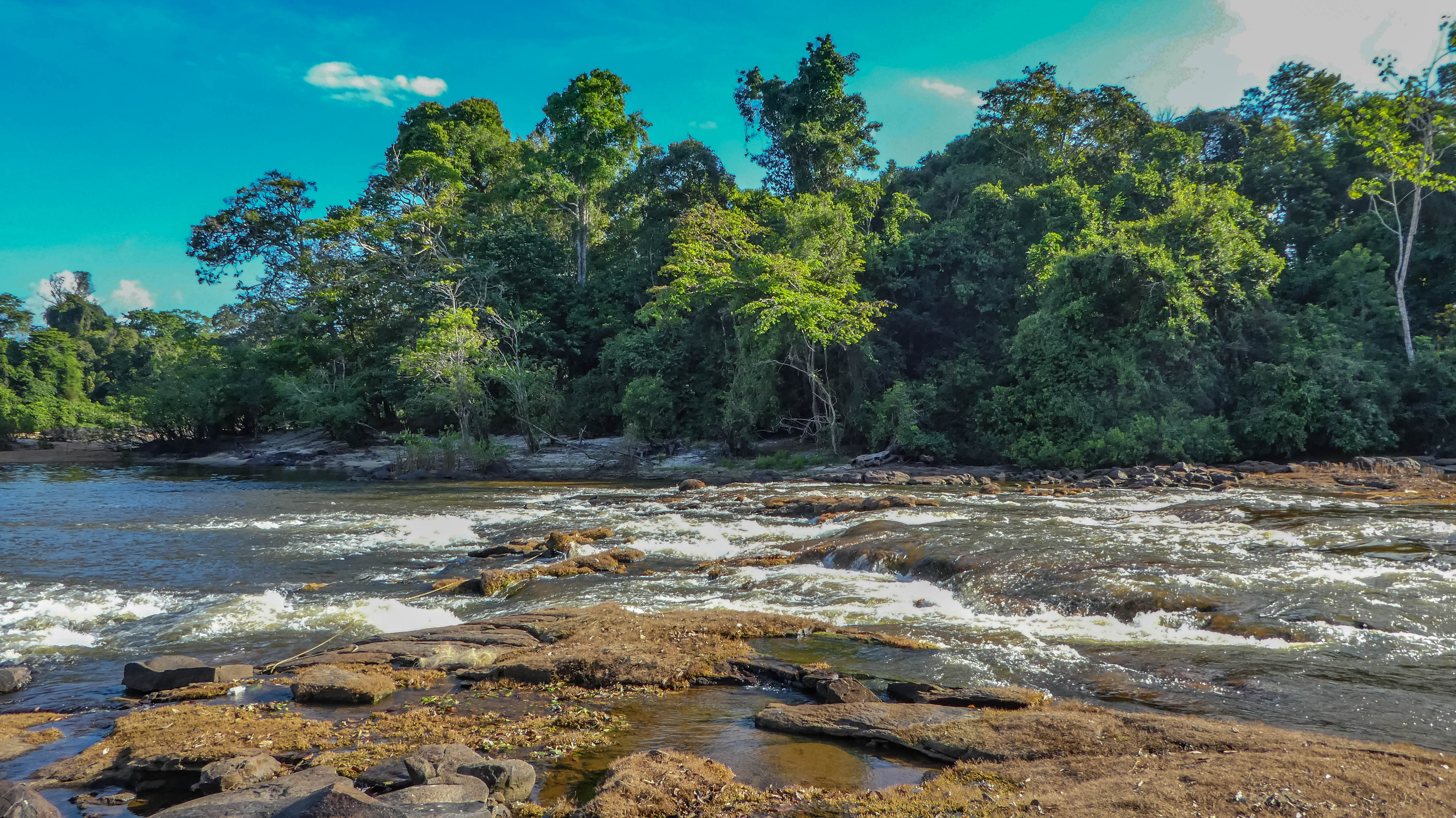
View of the Upper Suriname River just northeast of Nieuw Aurora, Sipaliwini

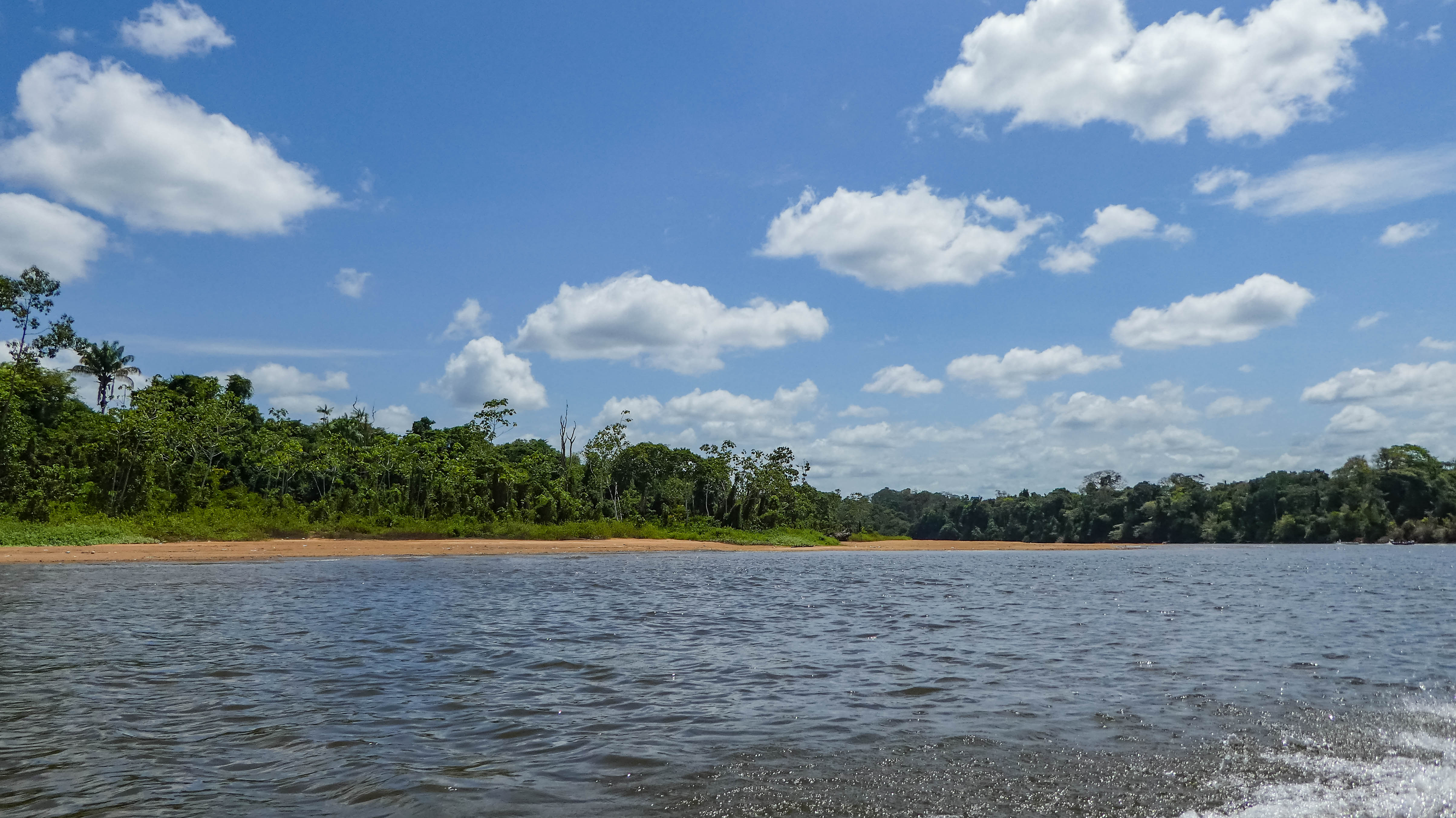
Traveling by dugout canoe from Atjoni to Gunsi on the Upper Suriname River

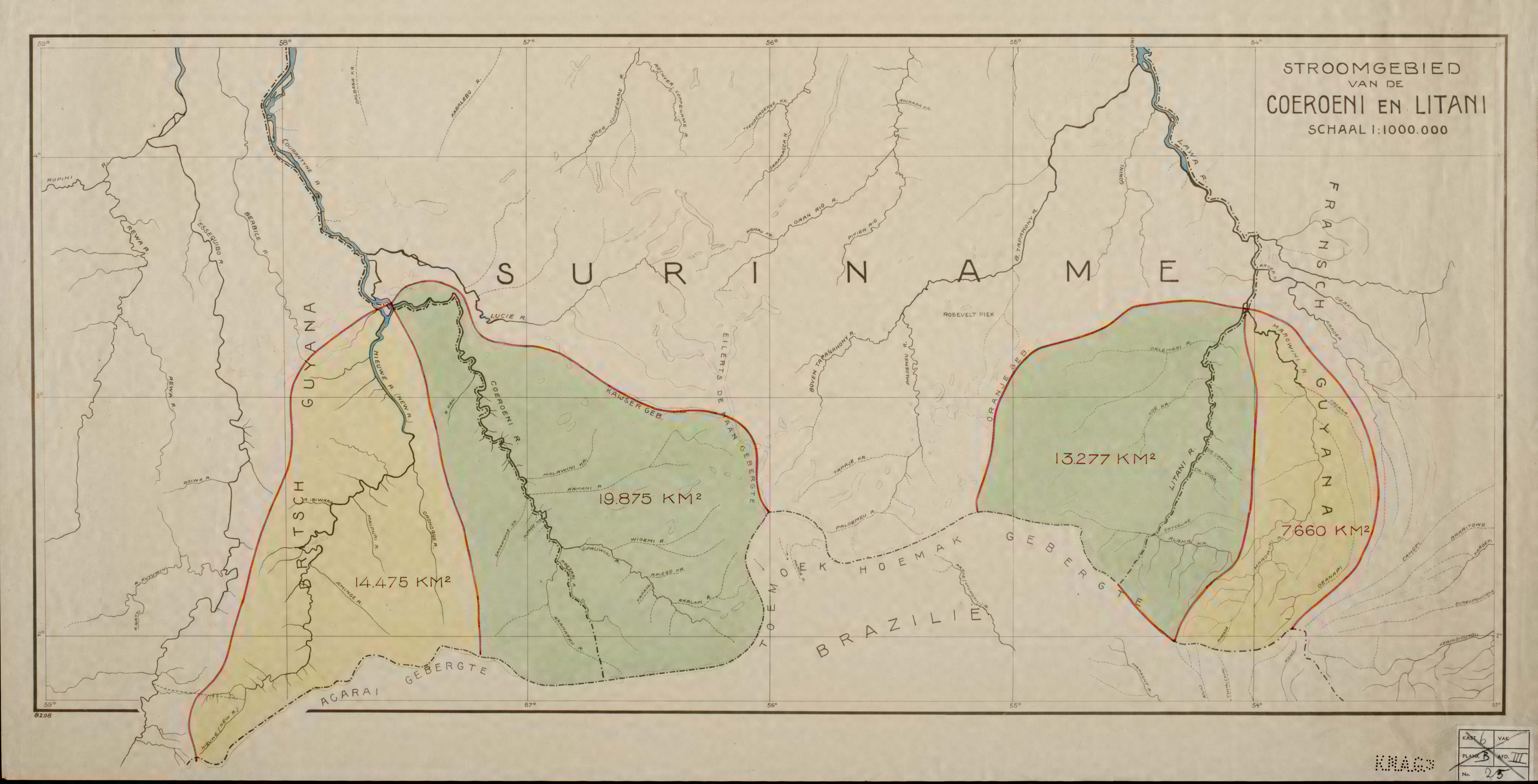
Suriname has territorial disputes with French Guiana and Guyana.

The district contains 156 villages. All of them except for Stoelmanseiland, Villa Brazil, and Antonio do Brinco are tribal.

- Abenaston
- Alalapadu
- Amatopo
- Antonio do Brinco
- Apetina
- Apoera
- Asidonhopo
- Aurora
- Bakhuys
- Benzdorp
- Bitagron
- Botopasi
- Corneliskondre
- Cottica
- Diitabiki
- Godo Holo
- Jaw Jaw
- Kajana
- Kasuela (disputed)
- Kawemhakan
- Kuruni
- Kwamalasamutu
- Kumakahpan
- Langatabiki
- Lensidede
- Lokaloka
- Lucie
- Manlobi
- Moitaki
- Nieuw Jacobkondre
- Paloemeu
- Pelelu Tepu
- Pikin Slee
- Pïleike
- Poeketi
- Poeloegoedoe
- Poesoegroenoe
- Pokigron
- Sandlanding
- Sipaliwini Savanna
- Snesiekondre
- Stoelmanseiland
- Tutu Kampu
- Vier Gebroeders
- Villa Brazil
- Wanapan
- Washabo
