= Gran Rio =

River in Suriname

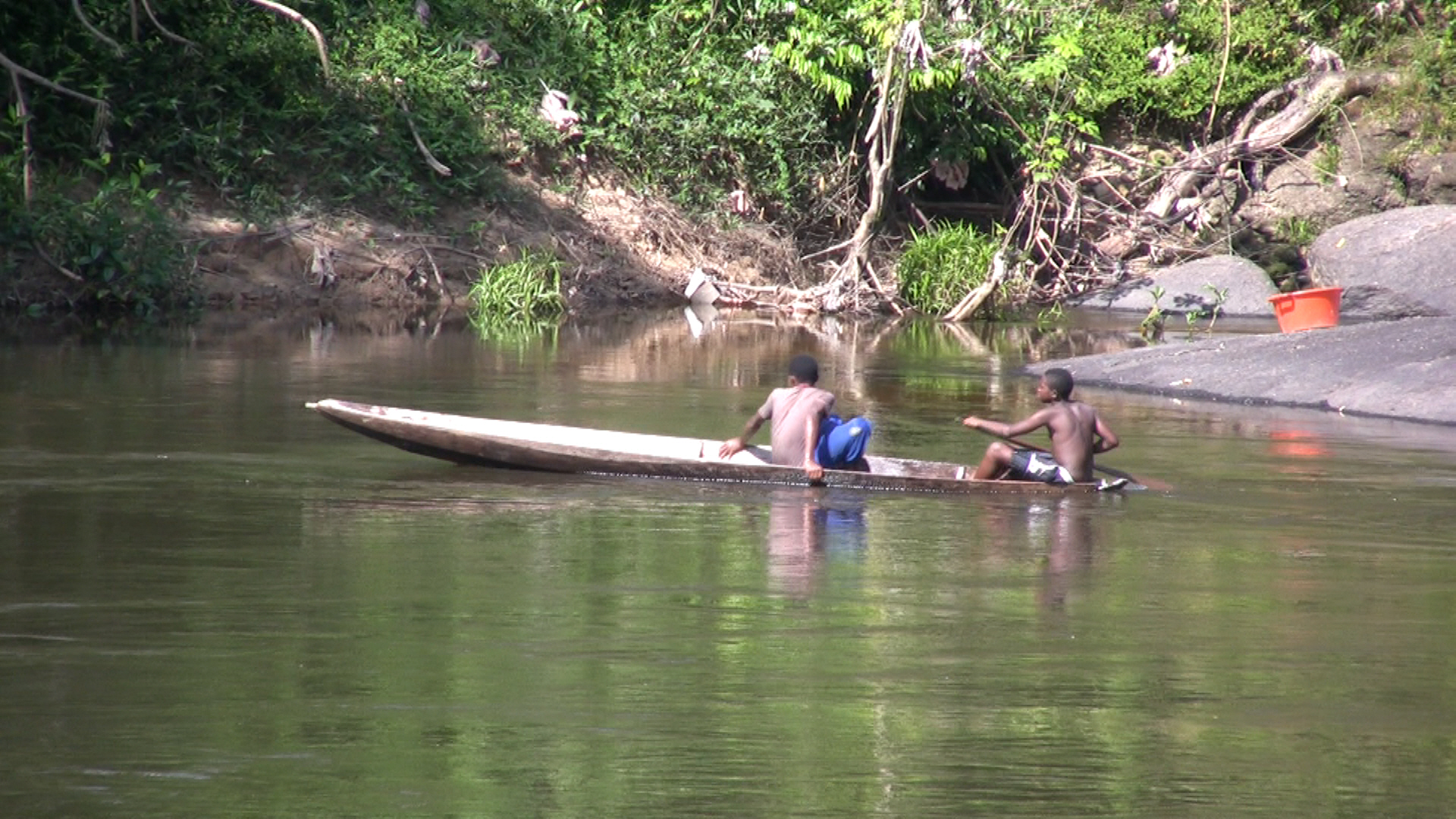
- Canoe on the Gran Rio

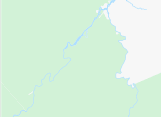
- Gran Rio (left) and Pikin Rio (right)

Location
- Country: Suriname

Physical characteristics
- Source
  - coordinates: 3.2646°N 56.2950°W
- Mouth: Upper Suriname River
  - coordinates: 4°0′45″N 55°28′47″W

Gran Rio (lit. 'Big River') is a river of Suriname. The Gran Rio joins with the Pikin Rio to form the Upper Suriname River. The river runs from the northern hills of the Eilerts de Haan Mountains. It has a stony bottom, forms many tiny islands and has many rapids. The river was first explored in 1908 by Eilerts de Haan to find the source of the Suriname River.

== See also ==
- List of rivers of Suriname
