= Pokigron =

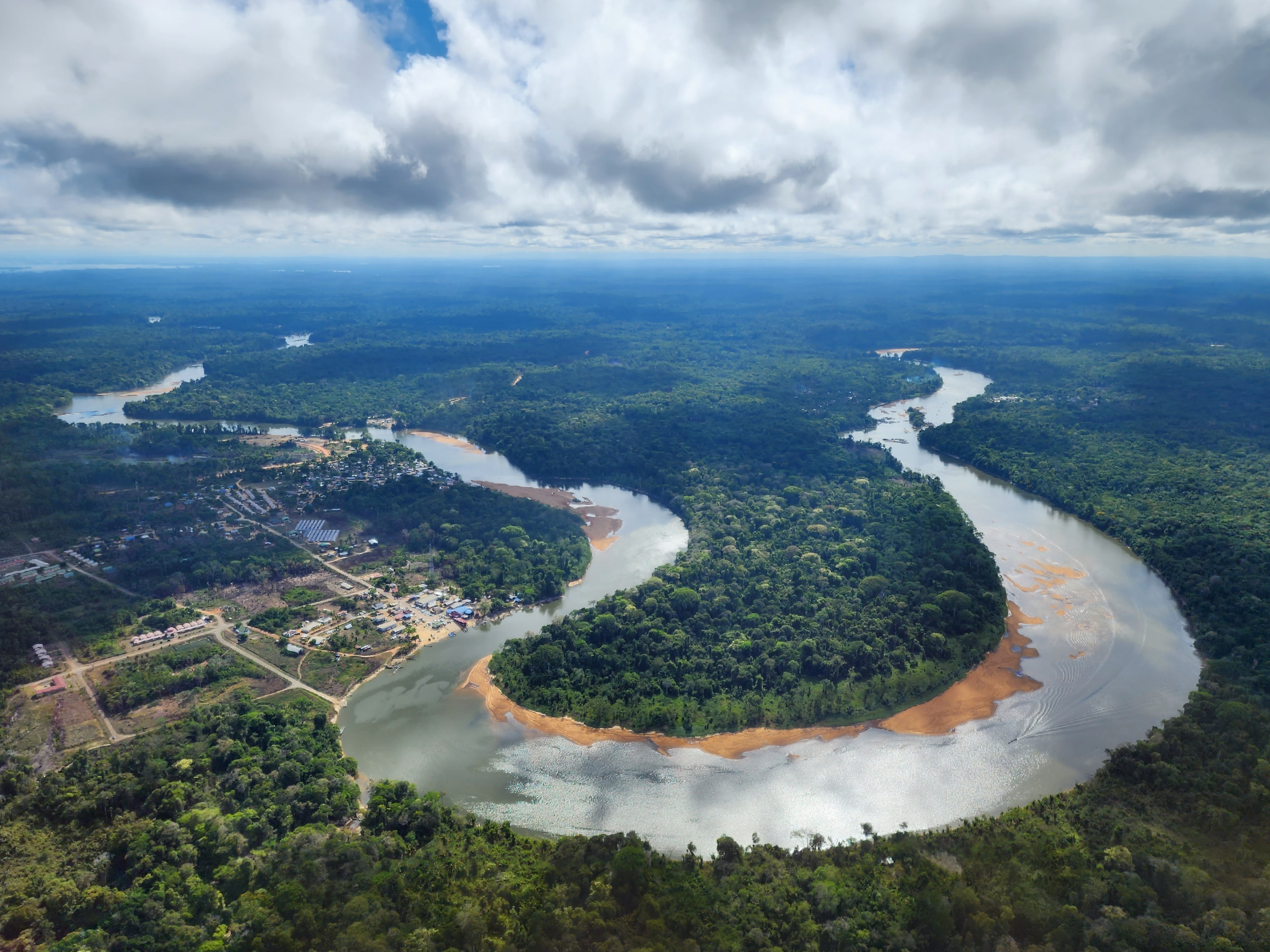
- Atjoni and Pokigron along the Upper Suriname River

- Location in Suriname
- Coordinates: 4.491111°N 55.365°W
- Country: Suriname
- District: Sipaliwini
- Resort (municipality): Boven Suriname
- Elevation: 246 ft (75 m)

Population (2018)
  - Total: ~400

Pokigron is a town in Suriname located on the Upper Suriname River near the Brokopondo Reservoir. It is located in the Boven Suriname municipality (resort) in the Sipaliwini District. It has a population of approximately 400 people in 2018. Pokigron is located at the end of a paved road via Brownsweg to the Avobakaweg. Pokigron is often referred to as Atjoni which is the nearby quay, and literally the end of the road. Villages to the South of Pokigron have to be accessed by boat. The village is home to Maroons of the Saramaka tribe.

Nearby towns and villages include Wittiehede Ston (19.6 nm), Mofina (15.6 nm), Wittikamba (1.4 nm), Malrosee-Kondre (5.1 nm) and Abenaston (3.0 nm).

== History ==
Pokigron was, up to 1986, a village with a population of 700, and reasonably prosperous as the main transport hub to the south of the country. Many of the typical huts with thatched roofs had been replaced by houses, and the village even had street lights. This changed on 23 April 1987. The Surinamese Interior War which had started far away in Albina and Moengotapoe the previous year, had come to Sipaliwini. The Jungle Commando headed by Ronnie Brunswijk ordered the villagers into the jungle, robbed them of their possessions, and burned their houses. On 11 September 1987, the National Army led by Dési Bouterse retaliated by attacking the Jungle Commando, and according to a report by Aide Médicale Internationale, killed civilians including women and children. Both parties have denied that any civilians had been killed. On 27 September 1989, the Inter-American Commission on Human Rights looked into the matter, declared that this constituted a very serious violation of the Right to Life, recommended that the Government of Suriname investigate the matter, and that the relatives of the victims are entitled to fair compensation. The IACHR identified 15 cases of deaths, four disappearances and one was unclear. Six of the cases were children, and three were women of which one was raped before she was killed. In October 1993, the IACHR sentenced the Government of Suriname to pay $400,000 (~$803,739 in 2025) in damages to the victims.

A group of civilians from Pokigron following the incidents squatted in a terrain near Paramaribo, and have named their camp Sunny Point. It is located in Koewarasan, Wanica.

As of 3 February 2018, the village of Pokigron now has 24 hours of electricity, because the Diesel generators could only provide for 5 to 6 hours.

== Healthcare ==
Pokigron is home to a Medische Zending healthcare centre.
