= Saramaka =

Maroon ethnic group of Suriname and French Guiana

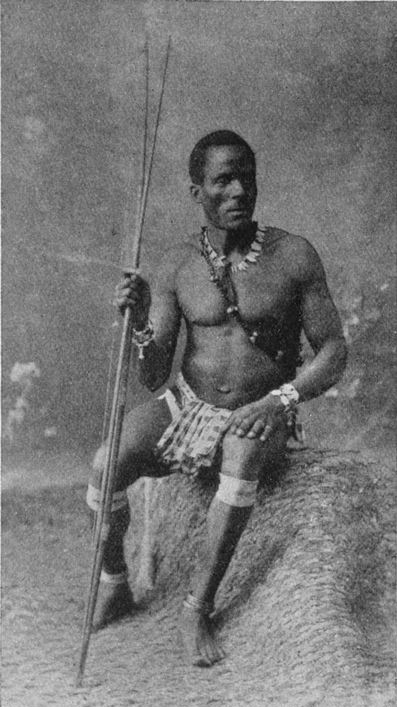
- Saramaka man, photo c.1910, from Sir Harry H. Johnson's The Negro in the New World

Total population
- 90,000 (2013, est.)

Regions with significant populations
- Tribal (Boven Suriname & Brokopondo): 28,500
- Paramaribo & suburbs: 29,000
- French Guiana: 25,000
- Netherlands: 7,500

Languages
- Saramaccan

Religion
- Saramaka religion, Christianity: Moravian, Catholic, Evangelical

Related ethnic groups
- Matawai, Kwinti

Granman of the Saramaka people
- Incumbent; Albert Aboikoni since 2018
- Residence: Asindoopo

The Saramaka, Saamaka or Saramacca (Eastern Maroon Creole: Saamaka) (Note: Beginning in mid-2010, the people formerly known as "Saramaka" began identifying themselves, in their official documents in English, as "Saamaka" to conform to their own pronunciation.) are one of six Maroon peoples (formerly called "Bush Negroes") in the Republic of Suriname and one of the Maroon peoples in French Guiana. In 2007, the Saramaka won a ruling by the Inter-American Court for Human Rights supporting their land rights in Suriname for lands they have historically occupied, over national government claims. It was a landmark decision for Maroon and Indigenous peoples in the world. They have received compensation for damages and control this fund for their own development goals.

The word "Maroon" comes from the Spanish cimarrón, which was derived from an Arawakan root. Since 1990 especially, some of the Saramaka have migrated to French Guiana due to a civil war in Suriname. By the early 16th century, the term "maroon" (cimarron) was used throughout the Americas to designate slaves who had escaped from slavery and set up independent communities beyond colonists' control.

== Setting and language ==
The 90,000 Saramaka in Suriname (some of whom live in neighboring French Guiana) are one minority within this multi-ethnic nation. The Saramaka, together with the other Maroons in Suriname and French Guiana: the Ndyuka (90,000), and the Matawai, Paramaka, Aluku, and Kwinti (who together number some 25,000).

Since their escape from slavery in the 17th and 18th centuries, the Saramaka have lived chiefly along the Upper Suriname River and its tributaries, the Gaánlío and the Pikílío. Since the 1960s, they also live along the Lower Suriname River in villages constructed by the colonial government and Alcoa, a major aluminum company. They were relocated to allow flooding of approximately half their tribal territory for a hydroelectric project built to supply electricity for an aluminum smelter. Today, about one-third of the Saramaka live in French Guiana, most having migrated there since 1990 after warfare in Suriname.

The Saramaka and the Matawai (in central Suriname) speak variants of a creole language called Saramaccan. The Ndyuka, Paramaka, and Aluku, (in eastern Suriname), as well as the several hundred Kwinti, speak variants of another creole language, Ndyuka. Both languages are historically related to Sranan Tongo, the creole language of coastal Suriname. About 50 percent of the Saramaccan lexicon derives from various West and Central African languages, 20 percent from English (the language of the original colonists in Suriname), 20 percent from Portuguese (the language of the overseers and slave masters on many Suriname plantations), and the remaining 10 percent from Amerindian languages and Dutch (the latter were later colonists). Although lexically different, the grammar resembles that of the other Atlantic creoles and derives from West African models.

== History ==
The ancestors of the Saramaka were among those Africans sold as plantation slaves to Europeans in Suriname in the late 17th and early 18th centuries. They came from a variety of West and Central African peoples such as the Akan, Bakongo, and Fon, among others. Thus, as a result, they spoke many different languages, they escaped into the dense rainforest – individually, in small groups, and sometimes in great collective rebellions. For nearly 100 years, they fought in the rainforest for their independence. They were so feared that late 18th century maps showed the defensive fortifications in the European colony intended to protect against their raids.

In 1762, a full century before the general emancipation of slaves in Suriname, the Maroons won their freedom and signed a treaty with the Dutch Crown to acknowledge their territorial rights and trading privileges. The Saramaka have a keen interest in the history of their formative years; they preserve their very rich oral tradition. Innovative scholarly research since the late 20th century has brought together oral and archival accounts in new histories. Like the other Suriname Maroons, the Saramaka lived almost as a state-within-a-state until the mid-20th century, when the pace of outside encroachments increased.

During the late 1980s, a civil war between Maroons and the military government of Suriname caused considerable hardship to the Saramaka and other Maroons. By mid-1989 approximately 3,000 Saramaka and 8,000 Ndyuka were living as temporary refugees in French Guiana. Access to the outside world was severely restricted for many Saramaka in their homeland. The end of the war in the mid-1990s initiated a period in which the national government largely neglected the needs of Saramaka and other Maroons while granting large timber and mining concessions to foreign multinationals (Chinese, Indonesian, Malaysian, and others) in traditional Saramaka territory. They did not consult the Saramaka authorities.

In addition, during this period there were numerous social changes, both on the coast of Suriname and in Saramaka territory. United States Peace Corps volunteers lived and worked in Saramaka villages, and Brazilian gold-miners arrived on the Suriname river. Such economic activities as prostitution, casino gambling, and drug smuggling became major industries in coastal Suriname and accompanied the miners to the interior.

In the mid-1990s, the Association of Saramaka Authorities filed a complaint before the Inter-American Commission of Human Rights to protect their land rights. In November 2007, the Inter-American Court for Human Rights ruled in favor of the Saramaka people against the government of Suriname. In this landmark decision, which establishes a precedent for all Maroon and Indigenous peoples in the Americas, the Saramaka were granted collective rights to the lands on which their ancestors had lived since the early 18th century, including rights to decide about the exploitation of natural resources such as timber and gold within that territory. In addition, they were granted compensation from the government for damages caused by previous timber grants made to Chinese companies. This was paid into a special development fund, which is now managed by the Saramaka.

=== Presence in French Guiana ===
The Saramaka maroons were originally living in Suriname. They first came to French Guiana in the 19th century as freighters to the interior. During the gold rush, their services became important for the economy. In 1883, the Governor of French Guiana and the Granman (paramount chief) of the Saramaka, signed an official accord that the Saramaka could stay in French Guiana under the legal authority of the Granman. The accords have never been rescinded and allow the tribe entry to French Guiana without the risk of deportation.

== Subsistence, economy, and the arts ==
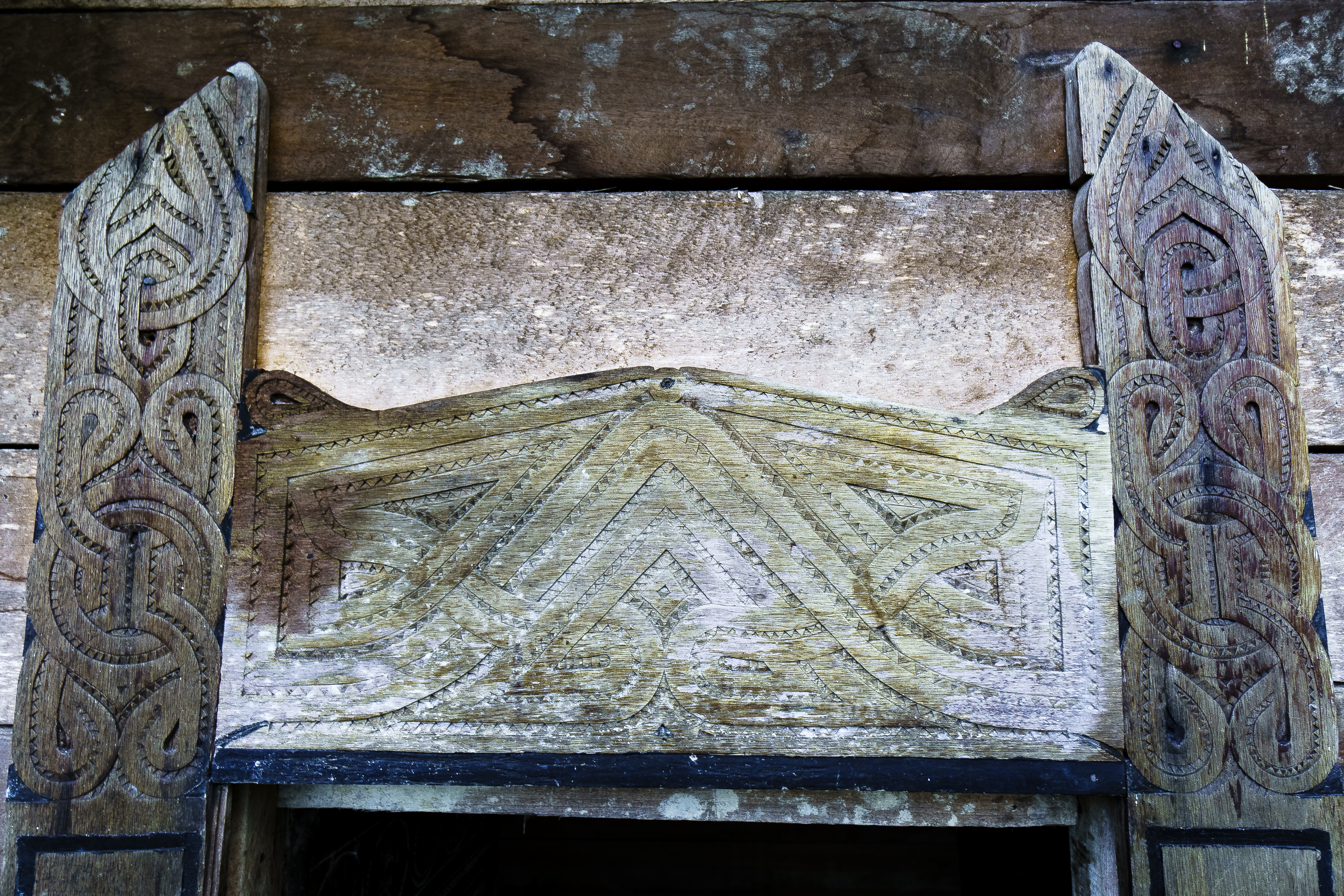
Example of art by the Saramaka folk

Traditional villages, which average 100 to 200 residents, consist of a core of matrilineal kin plus some wives and children of lineage men. Always located near a river, for water, transportation and fishing, they are constructed of an irregular arrangement of small houses, open-sided structures, domesticated trees, occasional chicken houses, various shrines, and scattered patches of bush. (In contrast, the so-called transmigration villages, built to house the 6,000 Saramaka displaced by the hydroelectric project, range up to 2,000 people. They are laid out in a European-style grid pattern, used throughout larger South American cities. In many cases they have been located far from the riverside, making life difficult for the occupants.) Horticultural camps, which include permanent houses and shrines, are located several hours by canoe from each village. They are exploited by small groups of women related through matrilineal ties.

Due to their matrilineal ties, many women have a house in their own birth village, another in their horticultural camp, and a third in their husband's village. Men divide their time among several different houses, built at various times for themselves and for their wives. Traditional Saramaka houses are compact, wide enough to tie a hammock and not much longer from front to back; with walls of planks and woven palm fronds, and traditionally roofs of thatch or, increasingly, of corrugated metal. They do not have windows but often have elaborately carved facades. Since the Suriname civil war, the Saramaka have built an increasing number of houses in coastal, Western style. They use concrete as well as wood, and feature windows and more expansive floor plans.

For more than two centuries, the economy has been based on full exploitation of the forest environment and on periodic work trips by men to the coast to bring back Western goods. For subsistence, the Saramaka depend on shifting (swidden) horticulture done mostly by women, with hunting and fishing done by men, supplemented by the women gathering wild forest products, such as palm nuts. They imported a few key items, such as salt. Rice is the most cultivated crop, in dry (hillside) technique. Other crops include cassava, taro, okra, maize, plantains, bananas, sugarcane, and peanuts. Domesticated trees, such as coconut, orange, breadfruit, papaya, and calabash are mainly cultivated in the villages. There are no markets.

Until the late 20th century, the Saramaka produced most of their material culture, much of it embellished with decorative detail. Women sewed patchwork and embroidered clothing, and carved calabash bowls. Some men also produced baskets, and some women made pottery. Men built the houses and canoes. In addition, they carved a wide range of wooden objects for domestic use, such as stools, paddles, winnowing trays, cooking utensils, and combs. Today, an increasing number of items, including clothing, are imported from the coast.

Body cicatrization, practiced by virtually all Saramaka women as late as the 1970s and 1980s, had become relatively uncommon by the start of the 21st century. Numerous genres of singing, dance, drumming, and tale telling continue to be a vibrant part of Saramaka culture.

Once the men have cleared and burned the fields, horticulture is mainly women's work. Women cultivate and process a variety of crops, choosing which to develop to continue preferred qualities. They process the food for meals and storage of foods such as peanuts. They use parts of plants to make some needed goods.

The men conduct hunting of game with shotguns; they also do most of the fishing as well. Men have long devoted a large portion of their adult years to earning money in work in coastal Suriname or French Guiana. This allows them to buy the Western goods considered essential to life in their home villages, such as shotguns and powder, tools, pots, cloth, hammocks, soap, kerosene, and rum. During the second half of the 20th century, small stores were established in many villages, making more goods available. Outboard motors, transistor radios, and tape recorders became common consumer items. Today, cell phones are ubiquitous: both men and women have greatly increased communication with Paramaribo. New economic opportunities in the gold industry – mining for men, prostitution for women – are being exploited.

== Social organization ==
Saramaka society is firmly based on a matrilineal kinship system. A clan (lo) – often several thousand individuals – consists of the matrilineal descendants of an original band of escaped slaves. Children are considered born into this clan. It is subdivided into lineages (bee) – usually 50 to 150 people – descended from a more recent ancestress. Several lineages from a single clan constitute the core of every village.

The matrilineal clans (lo) own land, based on claims staked out in the early 18th century as the original Maroons fled southward to freedom. Hunting and gathering rights belong to clan members collectively. Within the clan, temporary rights to land use for farming are negotiated by village headmen. The establishment of transmigration villages in the 1960s led to land shortages in certain regions. The success of the Saramakas in their lawsuit against the government of Suriname will now permit them to manage their lands with less outside interference.

Complex marriage prohibitions (including bee exogamy) and preferences are negotiated through divination. Demographic imbalance, owing to labor migration, permits widespread polygyny. Although co-wives hold equal status, relations between them are expected to be adversarial. The Saramaka treat marriage as an ongoing courtship, with frequent exchanges of gifts such as men's woodcarving and women's decorative sewing. Although many women live primarily in their husband's village, men never spend more than a few days at a time in the matrilineal (home) village of a wife.

Each house belongs to an individual man or woman, but most social interaction occurs outdoors. The men in each cluster of several houses, whether bee members or temporary visitors, eat meals together. The women of these same clusters, whether bee members or resident wives of bee men, spend a great deal of time in each other's company, often farming together as well.

Matrilineal principles, mediated by divination, determine the inheritance of material and spiritual possessions as well as political offices. Before death, however, men often pass on specialized ritual knowledge (and occasionally a shotgun) to a son.

Each child, after spending its first several years with its mother, is raised by an individual man or woman (not a couple) designated by the bee, girls typically are raised by women, and boys by men. Although children spend most of their time with matrilineal kin, father-child relations are warm and strong. Gender identity is established early, with children taking on responsibility for gender-typed adult tasks as soon as they are physically able. Girls often marry by age 15, whereas boys are more often in their twenties when they take their first wife.

A woman is required to go into seclusion during her menstrual cycle. The cycle is considered a time of transgression and destructive of village order. Women are not allowed to perform many of the village's functions and face other restrictions during their menstrual cycle. The Saramaka expression "to be in menstrual seclusion" is the same as "to be in mourning."

== Political organization and social control ==
The Saramaka people, like the other Maroon groups, are politically and formally run by men. The 2007 ruling of the Inter-American Court for Human Rights helps define the spheres of influence in which the national government and Saramaka authorities hold sway.

Saramaka society is egalitarian, with kinship forming the backbone of social organization. No social or occupational classes are distinguished. Elders are accorded special respect and ancestors are consulted, through divination, on a daily basis.

Protestant missionary schools have existed in some villages since the 18th century. State elementary schools came to most villages only in the 1960s. Schools ceased to function completely during the Suriname civil war of the late 1980s and have been rebuilt only partially since.

Since the 18th-century treaty, the Saramaka have had a government-approved paramount chief (gaamá), as well as a series of headmen (kabiteni) and assistant headmen (basiá). Traditionally, the role of these officials in political and social control was exercised in a context replete with oracles, spirit possession, and other forms of divination. As the national government is intervening more frequently in Saramaka affairs (and paying political officials nominal salaries), the sacred base of these officials’ power is gradually being eroded. These political offices are historically controlled and the property of clans (lo). Political activity is strongly dominated by men.

Council meetings (kuútu) and divination sessions provide complementary arenas for the resolution of social problems. Palavers may involve the men of a lineage, a village, or all Saramaka. They treat problems ranging from conflicts concerning marriage or fosterage to land disputes, political succession, or major crimes. These same problems, in addition to illness and other kinds of misfortune, are routinely interpreted through various kinds of divination as well. In all cases, consensus is found through negotiation, often with a strong role being played by gods and ancestors. In a type of reconciliation justice, guilty parties are usually required to pay for their misdeeds with material offerings to the lineage of the offended person. In the 18th century people found guilty of witchcraft were sometimes burned at the stake. Today, men caught in flagrante delicto with the wife of another man are either beaten by the woman's kinsmen or made to pay them a fine.

Aside from adultery disputes, which sometimes mobilize a full canoe-load of men seeking revenge in a public fistfight, intra-Saramaka conflict rarely surpasses the level of personal relations. The civil war that began in 1986, pitting Maroons against the national army of Suriname, brought major changes to the villages of the interior. Members of the "Jungle Commando" rebel army, almost all Ndyuka and Saramaka, learned to use automatic weapons. They became accustomed to a state of war and plunder. Their reintegration into Saramaka (and Ndyuka) society has been difficult, though their migration to the coast and French Guiana has provided a safety valve, if not for the receiving areas.

== Belief system ==
Every aspect of Saramaka life is based in various religious beliefs. Such decisions as where to clear a garden or build a house, whether to undertake a trip, or how to deal with theft or adultery are made in consultation with village deities, ancestors, forest spirits, and snake gods. The means of communication with these powers vary from spirit possession and the consultation of oracle-bundles, to the interpretation of dreams. Gods and spirits, which are a constant presence in daily life, are also honored through frequent prayers, libations, feasts, and dances.

The rituals surrounding birth, death, and other life passages are extensive, as are those relating to more mundane activities, from hunting a tapir to planting a rice field. Today about 25 per cent of Saramaka are nominal Christians – mainly Moravian (some since the mid-18th century), but others Roman Catholic. Increasingly some are converted to Evangelicalism of one or another kind.

The Saramaka world is populated by a wide range of supernatural beings, from localized forest spirits and gods that reside in the bodies of snakes, vultures, jaguars, and other animals, to ancestors, river gods, and warrior spirits. Within these categories, each supernatural being is named, individualized, and given specific relationships to living people. Intimately involved in the ongoing events of daily life, these beings communicate to humans mainly through divination and spirit possession. Kúnus are the avenging spirits of people or gods who were wronged during their lifetime and who pledge themselves to eternally tormenting the matrilineal descendants and close matrilineal kinsmen of their offender. Much of Saramaka ritual life is devoted to their appeasement. The Saramaka believe that all evil originates in human action; not only does each misfortune, illness, or death stem from a specific past misdeed, but every offense, whether against people or gods, has eventual consequences. The ignoble acts of the dead intrude daily on the lives of the living; any illness or misfortune calls for divination, which quickly reveals the specific past act that caused it. Through the performance of rites, the ancestors speak, the gods dance, and the world is again made right.

Individual specialists who supervise rites oversee the major village- and clan-owned shrines that serve large numbers of clients, as well as the various categories of possession gods, and various kinds of minor divination. These specialists generally pass on their knowledge to selected individuals before death. A large proportion of Saramaka have some kind of specialized ritual expertise, which they occasionally exercise. They are paid in cloth, rum, or, increasingly, cash.

Saramaka ceremonial life is not determined by the calendar, but rather regulated by the occurrence of particular misfortunes, interpreted through divination. The most important ceremonies include those surrounding funerals and the appeasement of ancestors, public curing rites, rituals in honor of kúnus (in particular snake gods and forest spirits), and the installation of political officials.

Every case of illness is believed to have a specific cause that can be determined only through divination. The causes revealed vary from a lineage kúnu to sorcery, from a broken taboo to an ancestor's displeasure. Once the cause is known, rites are carried out to appease the offended god or ancestor (or otherwise right the social imbalance). Since the 1960s, Western mission clinics and hospitals have been used by most Saramaka as a supplement to their own healing practices. During the Suriname Civil War of the 1980s and 1990s, most of these facilities were destroyed. They have only been very partially restored since.

The dead play an active role in the lives of the living. Ancestor shrines – several to a village – are the site of frequent prayers and libations, as the dead are consulted about ongoing village problems. A death occasions a series of complex rituals that lasts about a year, culminating in the final passage of the deceased to the status of ancestor. The initial rites, which are carried out over a period of one week to three months, depending on the importance of the deceased, end with the burial of the corpse in an elaborately constructed coffin filled with personal belongings. These rites include divination with the coffin (to consult the spirit of the deceased) by carrying it on the heads of two men, feasts for the ancestors, all-night drum/song/dance performances, and the telling of folktales. Some months later, a "second funeral" is conducted to mark the end of the mourning period and to chase the ghost of the deceased from the village forever. These rites involve the largest public gatherings in Saramaka and also include all-night drum/song/dance performances. At their conclusion, the deceased has passed out of the realm of the living into that of the ancestors.

== Isolation ==
The Saramaka people beyond Gaan Lio lived in relative isolation and as an uncontacted people group from the time of their ancestor's escape from slavery in the eighteenth century. In the latter part of 1993, a local, independent missionary by the name of Steve Groseclose and a small group of Saramaka men from other less remote villages ventured beyond the main barrier point called Tapa Wata Sula, translated as Shut Off Rapids. This initial excursion led to subsequent trips and began the gradual influx of increasing outside influence throughout the following years. A local Saramaka man named Pompeia had left one of the uncontacted villages to visit the capital city of Paramaribo earlier that year. His knowledge of the villages beyond Tapa Wata Sula made him an invaluable guide on the first trips into the area.

== Ethnographic studies ==
Ethnography among the Saramaka was first conducted by Americans Melville and Frances Herskovits (during two summers in 1928 and 1929). Americans Richard and Sally Price have also studied the people (intermittently between 1966 and the present: in Suriname until 1986, and in French Guiana thereafter). This late-20th century fieldwork complements the modern fieldwork carried out among other groups of Suriname Maroons, such as the Ndyuka ethnography of Dutch scholars Bonno Thoden van Velzen and his partner Ineke van Wetering.

Edward C. Green, an American medical anthropologist, conducted fieldwork among the Matawais between 1970 and 1973, with intermittent visits since. His doctoral dissertation focused on changes underway then in the matrilineal kinship and Indigenous spiritual belief systems. He has become known for his work on processes related to AIDS and sexually transmitted diseases, especially in African nations, and making use of Indigenous healers.
