= Centrum =

Centrum (Latin for center) may refer to:

== Places ==
=== In Greenland ===
- Nuuk Centrum, a district of Nuuk, Greenland
- Centrum Lake, Greenland

=== In the Netherlands ===
- Amsterdam-Centrum, the inner-most borough of Amsterdam, Netherlands
- Rotterdam Centrum, a borough of Rotterdam, Netherlands

=== In Poland ===
- Centrum, Szczecin, a neighbourhood of Szczecin, Poland
- Centrum (municipal neighbourhood of Warsaw), a neighbourhood of Warsaw, Poland
- Osiedle Centrum, Białystok, a district of Białystok, Poland
- Centrum metro station, a metro station in Warsaw, Poland

=== In Suriname ===
- Centrum, Brokopondo, a resort of Brokopondo District
- Centrum, Paramaribo, a resort of Paramaribo District

=== In Sweden ===
- Centrum, Gothenburg, a borough of Gothenburg, Sweden
- Centrum, Luleå, a residential area in Luleå, Sweden
- Centrum, Malmö, a city district of Malmö, Sweden
- Centrum, Umeå, a residential area in Umeå, Sweden

== Buildings and structures ==
- The Centrum, the former informal but regularly used name of an arena in Worcester, Massachusetts
- Centrum Arena (disambiguation)

== Other uses ==
- Vertebral centrum, the central portion of the vertebra
- Centrum (arts organization), a Washington state performing arts organization
- Centrum (multivitamin), a brand of multivitamin
- Centre (Polish parliamentary group), a Polish parliamentary group founded in 2026

== See also ==
- Center (disambiguation)
- Centra (disambiguation)
- Centre Party (disambiguation)
- Centrium (disambiguation)
