= Maria Hartmann =

German-born Moravian missionary

Maria Lobach Hartmann
- Born: 11 December 1798; Turnow, Lower Lusatia
- Died: 30 December 1853 (aged 55); Paramaribo, Suriname
- Occupation: Missionary
- Years active: 1826-1853
- Notable work: Founding of Koffiekamp

Maria (sometimes Marie) Lobach Hartmann (11 December 1798 – 30 December 1853) was a German-born Moravian missionary in Suriname.

Maria Lobach (Sorbian: Marija Lobakojc) was born to a Sorbian family in Turnow, Lower Lusatia. She married the missionary Johann Gottlieb Hartmann, and travelled with him to Suriname in 1826; the couple lived and worked in Paramaribo and Charlottenburg, Wanhatti. (Note: There are at least two plantations called Charlottenburg, however the Moravian Church operated a centre in Charlottenburg, Wanhatti.) They had five children, including Maria Heyde; another of their children followed in his parents' footsteps, continuing to work in Suriname. One of their sons went to South Africa to work with the slaves there. Johann died in 1844, but Maria continued her service, working with the black population of Berg en Dal and Bambey, (Note: Bambey (or Bambeij in Een levensteeken op een doodenveld) was a Moravian mission post downriver from the waterfall with the village of Gansee upriver.) and traveling into the bush country to teach the freed blacks. 1851 was the darkest year, everybody, except for Hartmann, died of yellow fever, and Hartmann left Bambey, and moved to the forest.

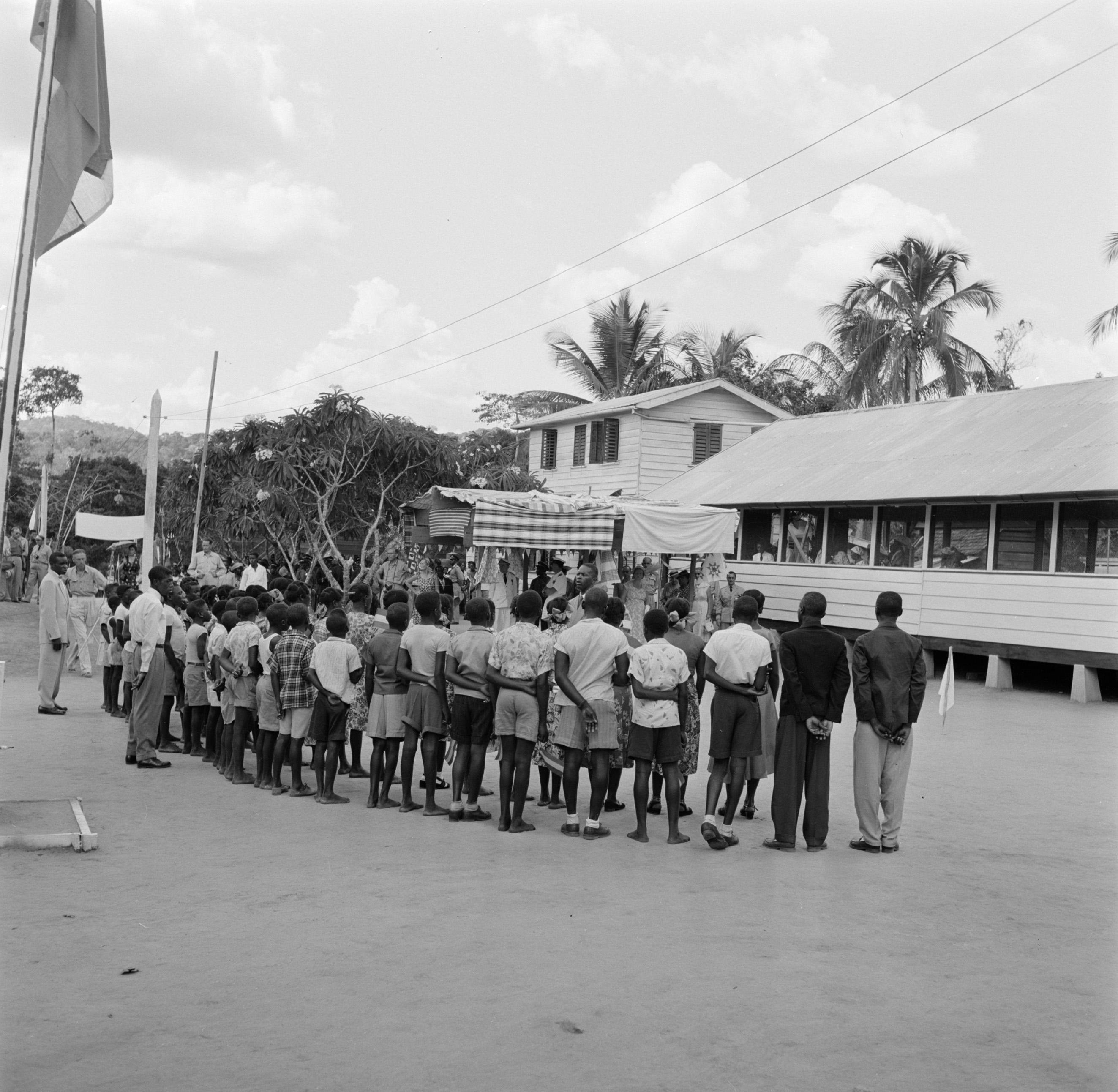
The school of Koffiekamp in 1955

Among her activities was teaching younger missionaries. She suffered from elephantiasis, but continued to work until dying; upon her death a number of articles were written praising her example. Her accomplishments included the founding of Koffiekamp, Sarakreek in 1851. The church was built in 1853, however she had fallen ill. Somebody of her parish arrived to witness the consecration of the church, and discovered Maria in her hammock. On 22 December 1853, she was transported to Paramaribo, where she died on 30 December.

In 1965, Koffiekamp was flooded after the construction of the Afobaka Dam. The villagers were resettled in Nieuw-Koffiekamp, Marshallkreek and Tapoeripa.
