= Sarakreek =

- Resort
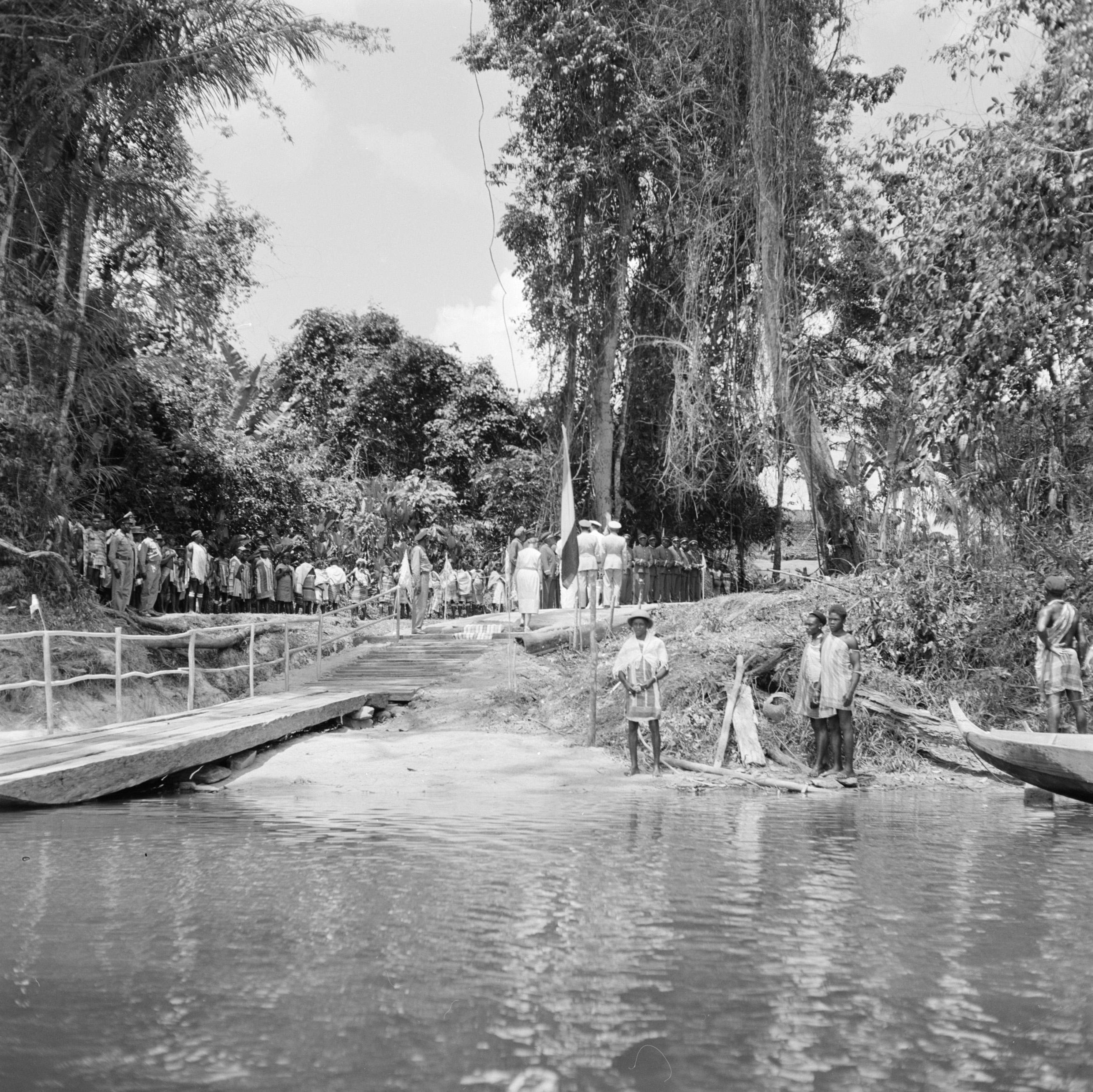
- The former village of Koffiekamp (1955)

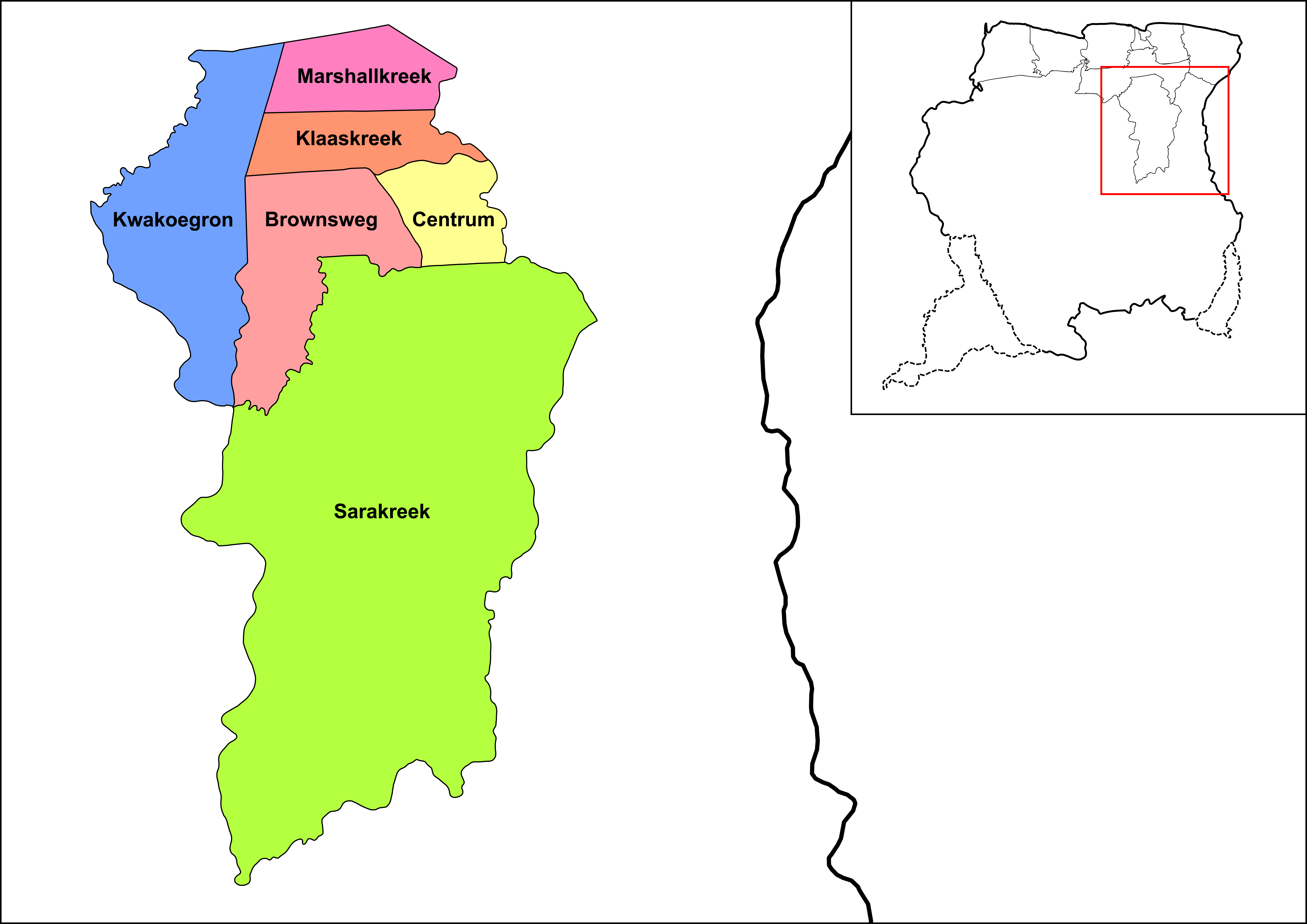
- Map showing the resorts of Brokopondo District. Sarakreek
- Coordinates: 4°19′N 54°58′W
- Country: Suriname
- District: Brokopondo District

Area
  - Total: 4,566 km^{2} (1,763 sq mi)

Population (2012 census)
  - Total: 3,076
  - Density: 0.6737/km^{2} (1.745/sq mi)
- Time zone: UTC-3 (AST)

Sarakreek is a resort (≈ municipality) in the gold mining region of Brokopondo District in Suriname. Its population at the 2012 census was 3,076. It is served by the Sarakreek Airstrip. The resort is named after the eponymous creek.

A large part of Sarakreek was flooded after the construction of the Afobaka Dam, and the villages which were lost in the Brokopondo Reservoir were resettled in Marshallkreek and Tapoeripa.

Villages in the resort include: Baikutu, Duwatra, Lebidoti, and Zoewatta.

Flooded villages include: Abontjeman and Ganzee.

== Koffiekamp ==
The federation of Koffiekamp was among the lost villages, and consisted of three settlements: Maipa-ondo of the misidjan lo of clan founded in 1793, Baka Mbuju of the Njanfai-lo of clan, and Maria Hartmann founded Koffiekamp in 1851. Koffiekamp was located at the confluence of the Sara Creek and the Suriname River.
