= Abontjeman =

- Former settlement
- Location in Suriname
- Coordinates: 4°53′35″N 54°57′29″W
- Country: Suriname
- District: Brokopondo
- Resort: Sarakreek
- Time zone: UTC-3 (ART)

Abontjeman is an abandoned settlement in Brokopondo District, Suriname. It was located along the Sara Creek, and used to be inhabited by maroons. The village was flooded in 1964 after the construction of the Afobaka Dam.

Abontjeman used to have a train station on the Lawa Railway. In the 1920s, Elwyn Benjamin Fairweather, a bauxite entrepreneur from British Honduras, cleared a 40 kilometres (25 mi) long path from Abontjeman to the Marowijne River with the intention of building of road. Fairweather's company ceased to exist in 1943.
