= Nieuw-Koffiekamp =

- Village
- Location within Suriname
- Coordinates: 5°4′31″N 55°12′44″W
- Country: Suriname
- District: Brokopondo District
- Resort: Brownsweg

Government
  - Captain: Hermanus Shalwijk (2019)

Population (2017)
  - Total: 300
- Time zone: UTC-3 (AST)

Nieuw-Koffiekamp is a village in the resort of Brownsweg in the Brokopondo District of Suriname. It is a transmigration village built for the inhabitants of Koffiekamp which was flooded by the Brokopondo Reservoir after the construction of the Afobaka Dam.

== History ==
The transmigration village of Nieuw-Koffiekamp was founded in 1964, because the village of Koffiekamp was going to be flooded by the Brokopondo Reservoir. Koffiekamp was a federation of three settlements of the Ndyuka Maroons: Maipa-ondo of the Misidjan lo (clan) founded in 1793, Baka Mbuju of the Njanfai lo, and Maria Hartmann founded Koffiekamp in 1851 as a mission of the Moravian Church. The population was estimated at 500 inhabitants.

== Overview ==
Nieuw-Koffiekamp contains a school and a medical centre. It has access to the electricity grid. The village is connected to the road network. The number of inhabitants of the village varies greatly. The official figure in 2017 was 300, however the village council estimated the population at around 500.

== Gold mining conflict ==
The economy is mainly based on gold mining. Most of the villagers used to work at the Roma Pit. In 1994 the concession was awarded to Iamgold. In mid-2010, the company started to exploit the mine and removed the gold prospectors from the mine. The people were given a new area which contained significantly less gold. After protests, a contract was signed with Iamgold in 2017 which permitted the villagers to remain in the Roma Pit.
