= Baikutu =

Baikutu Baikoetoe (Dutch)
- Location in Suriname
- Coordinates: 4°33′4″N 55°16′50″W
- Country: Suriname
- District: Brokopondo District
- Resort (municipality): Sarakreek

Baikutu (Dutch: Baikoetoe) is a village in Sarakreek resort in Brokopondo District in Suriname. It is located on the Upper Suriname River, shortly before the Brokopondo Reservoir.

Nearby towns and villages include Mofina (17.0 nm), Warnakomoponafaja (17.4 nm), La Valere (16.1 nm), Adawai (7.0 nm), Copaivagogo (8.2 nm), Wittikamba (4.2 nm) and Zoewatta (1.0 nm). The unpaved road to the Avobakaweg has been renovated in 2009. Baikutu and neighbouring Banafow Kondre has a population of about 200 people.
