= Marshallkreek =

- Resort
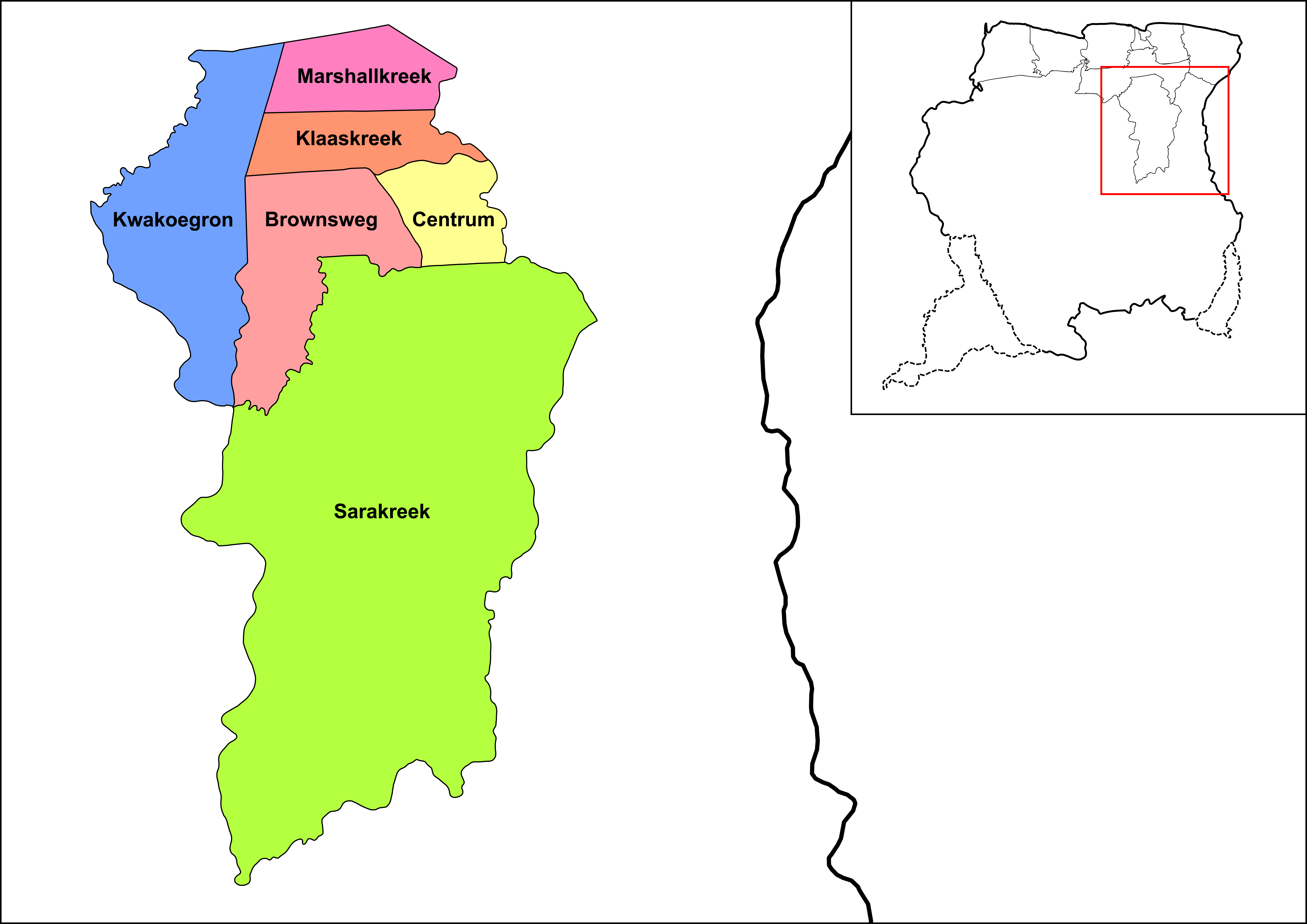
- Map showing the resorts of Brokopondo District. Marshallkreek
- Coordinates: 5.263611°N 55.081111°W
- Country: Suriname
- District: Brokopondo District

Area
  - Total: 354 km^{2} (137 sq mi)

Population (2012 census)
  - Total: 1,171
  - Density: 3.31/km^{2} (8.57/sq mi)
- Time zone: UTC-3 (AST)
- Climate: Af

Marshallkreek (also Marchallkreek) is a resort in Suriname, located in the Brokopondo District. Its population at the 2012 census was 1,171. The resort and town are named after Captain Marshall who first settled Suriname in 1630.

The resort contains the following villages: Koinakondre, Laizang Kondre, Marshallkreek, Phedra, and Rama. There are two schools: one in Marshallkreek and one near the Avobakaweg. Medische Zending operates a clinic in Marshallkreek and Phedra.

The former plantation Phedra is the agricultural centre of the resort. In 1960, a palm oil plantation was based in Phedra, however the Surinamese Interior War and lethal yellowing resulted in the closure of the factory in Victoria, Klaaskreek in 1996. Marshallkreek was one of the transmigration villages for the inhabitants of Sarakreek which were flooded after the construction of the Afobaka Dam.
