= Brokopondo =

Brokopondo Bokopondo (Eastern Maroon Creole)
- District capital
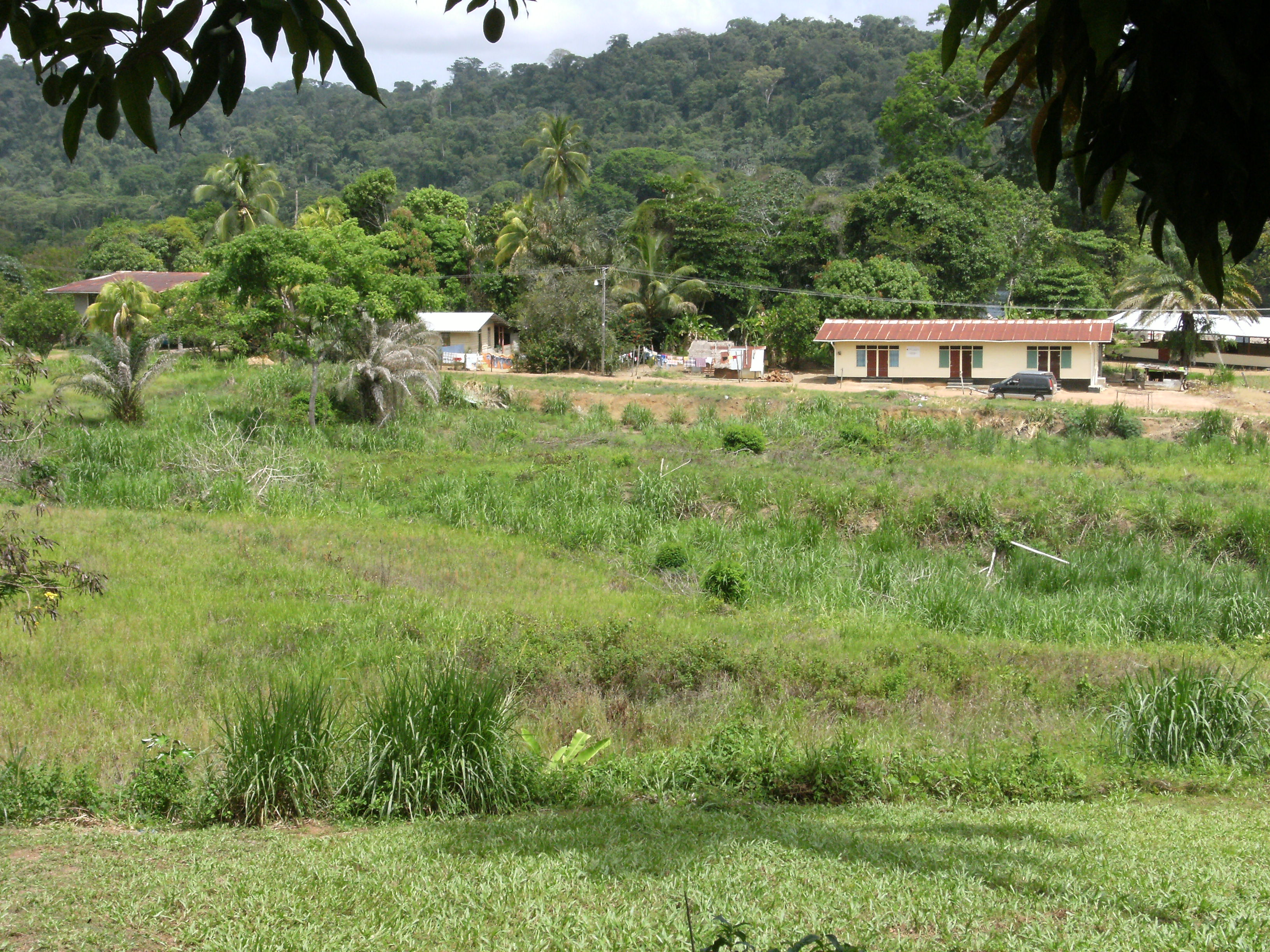

- Location in Suriname
- Coordinates: 5°4′N 54°58′W
- Country: Suriname
- District: Brokopondo District
- Resort: Centrum
- Elevation: 72 m (236 ft)

Population (2011)
  - Total: est. 2,480
- Time zone: UTC-03:00 (SRT)

Brokopondo (Eastern Maroon Creole: Bokopondo or Bookopondo) is the capital town of the Brokopondo District, Suriname. It is located on the west shore of the Suriname river, just north of the Afobaka dam, 105 kilometers (65 miles) south-east of Suriname capital city of Paramaribo. Brokopondo can be reached via the Avobakaweg from Paranam to Afobaka.

Nearby is a granite monument made by sculptor Jo Rens, displaying two men: one standing with a parrot and one sitting and writing. It is meant to symbolize the past and the future. There is also a large beach next to the Suriname river near the city centre. Demographically, the largest ethnic group of Brokopondo are the Maroons.

The Brokopondo Development Plan has designated the town of Brokopondo as one of the two major centres in the region - the other being Brownsweg - with a focus on tourism. There is a large beach next to the Suriname river near the city centre called Anani Beach. Additional developments will be a proper city centre, a bus station, a large hotel with at least 200 beds, and a centre for cultural studies.

Brokopondo is home to a Medische Zending healthcare centre, hotel, school, and police station. In 2014, multi functional centre was opened. On 10 January 2020, a waste incinerator was installed.

A growing concern is the activity of gold prospectors who not only poison the rivers with mercury, but are digging away the edge of the town.
