= Brokopondo District =

District of Suriname

Brokopondo Bokopondoliba (Eastern Maroon Creole)
- District
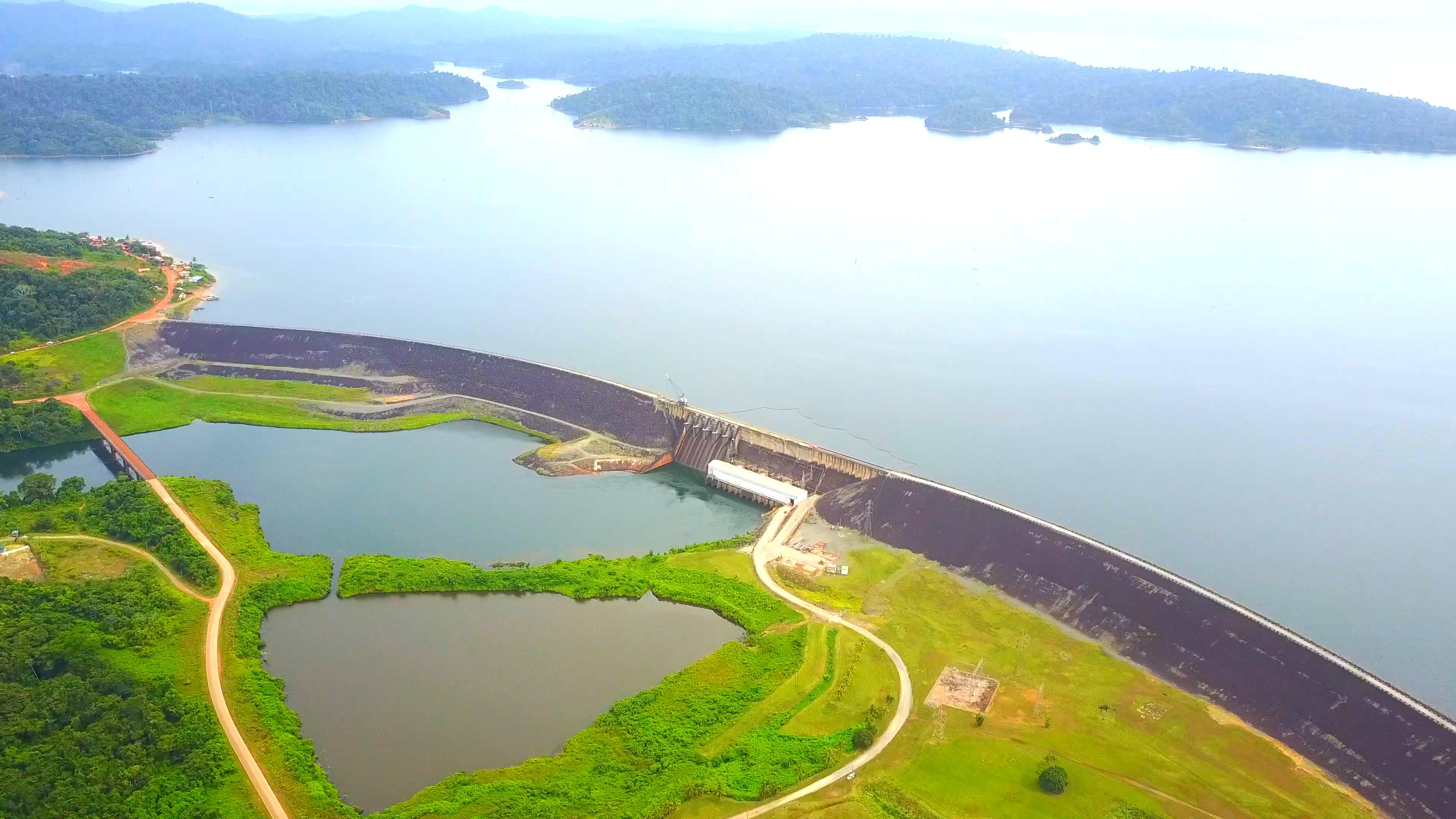
- Brokopondo reservoir

- Map of Suriname showing Brokopondo district
- Coordinates: 4°46′N 55°08′W
- Country: Suriname
- Capital: Brokopondo

Government
  - District Commissioner: Gregory van der Kamp

Area
  - Total: 7,364 km^{2} (2,843 sq mi)

Population (2012 census)
  - Total: 15,909
  - Density: 2.160/km^{2} (5.595/sq mi)
- Time zone: UTC-3

Brokopondo (Eastern Maroon Creole: Bokopondo or Bookopondo) is a district of Suriname. Its capital city is Brokopondo; other towns include Brownsweg and Kwakoegron.

The district has a population of 15,909, and an area of 7,364 square kilometres.

== History ==
The Brokopondo district was established in 1959 out of the former Suriname District. The establishment of the district was related to the 1958 Brokopondo Agreement between the Government of Suriname and Alcoa for the creation of the Brokopondo Reservoir. The Brokopondo Reservoir is a large reservoir near Afobaka which was built between 1961 and 1964, and produces hydroelectric power that provides approximately half of the domestic electrical need.

The plan was very controversial, and involved transmigrating many villages that were located in the area and flooded after the construction of the Afobaka Dam. The transmigration concerned 5,000 people who were almost exclusively Maroons. In 1960, the Avobakaweg was constructed to link the reservoir with Paramaribo and the rest of the country. In 1983, the Districts were redrawn, and most of the tribal interior of Suriname was moved into the Sipaliwini District.

The Brokopondo Development Plan has designated the town of Brokopondo and Brownsweg as the two major centres in the region with a focus on tourism. Both towns lack a proper city centre, and will be redevelopment in the early 21st century.

== Nature ==
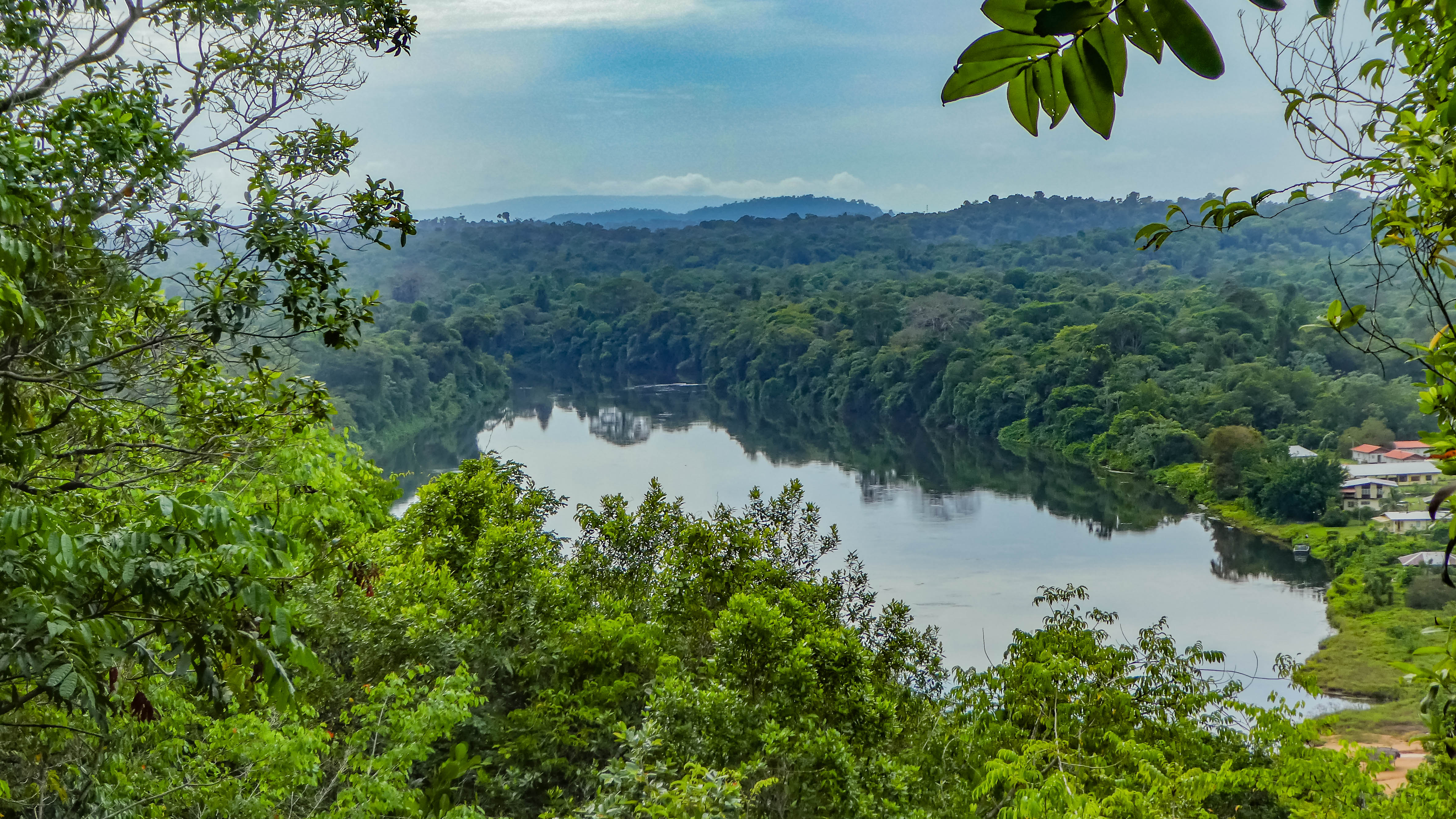
Suriname River as seen from the Blauwe Berg

The district has several waterfalls, including the Irene Falls and Leo Falls. In the rainforest of Brokopondo, there are large reserves where a diverse variety of wildlife exists. Brownsberg Nature Park is a 12,250 hectares nature park in the area which was founded in 1969. About 8,400 hectares are allocated for scientific research. The 60 square km Brinckheuvel Nature Reserve is also located in the District and was established in 1966. Berg en Dal is a former wood plantation located near the Avobakaweg. In 2008 the plantation was transformed into the Berg en Dal Eco & Cultural Resort, a luxury holiday resort for ecotourism. Berg en Dal is home to the Blauwe Berg, a mountain overlooking the Suriname River.

== Agricultural ==
Most of the District is not suitable for large scale agriculture. The main crops are maize, soya, pineapples, and peanuts. The former plantation Phedra is the agricultural centre of the resort. In 1960, a palm oil plantation was based in Phedra, however the Surinamese Interior War and lethal yellowing resulted in the closure of the factory in Victoria, Klaaskreek in 1996.

== Economy ==
Recently, gold has been discovered in the Brokopondo district, and this has led to many new settlers arriving in the district, both from other parts of Suriname and from the rest of the world. In 2011, a large scale concession was given to the Suparna Gold Corporation in Sarakreek.

== Politics ==
Brokopondo is one of the ten administrative divisions within Suriname.

=== District Commissioner ===
The District Commissioner (abbreviated as DC) is the Administrative Head of the district and also chairman of the District Council. The District Commissioner is assisted by a District Secretary and a number of other executive officials. The incumbent is Gregory van der Kamp.

== Resorts ==
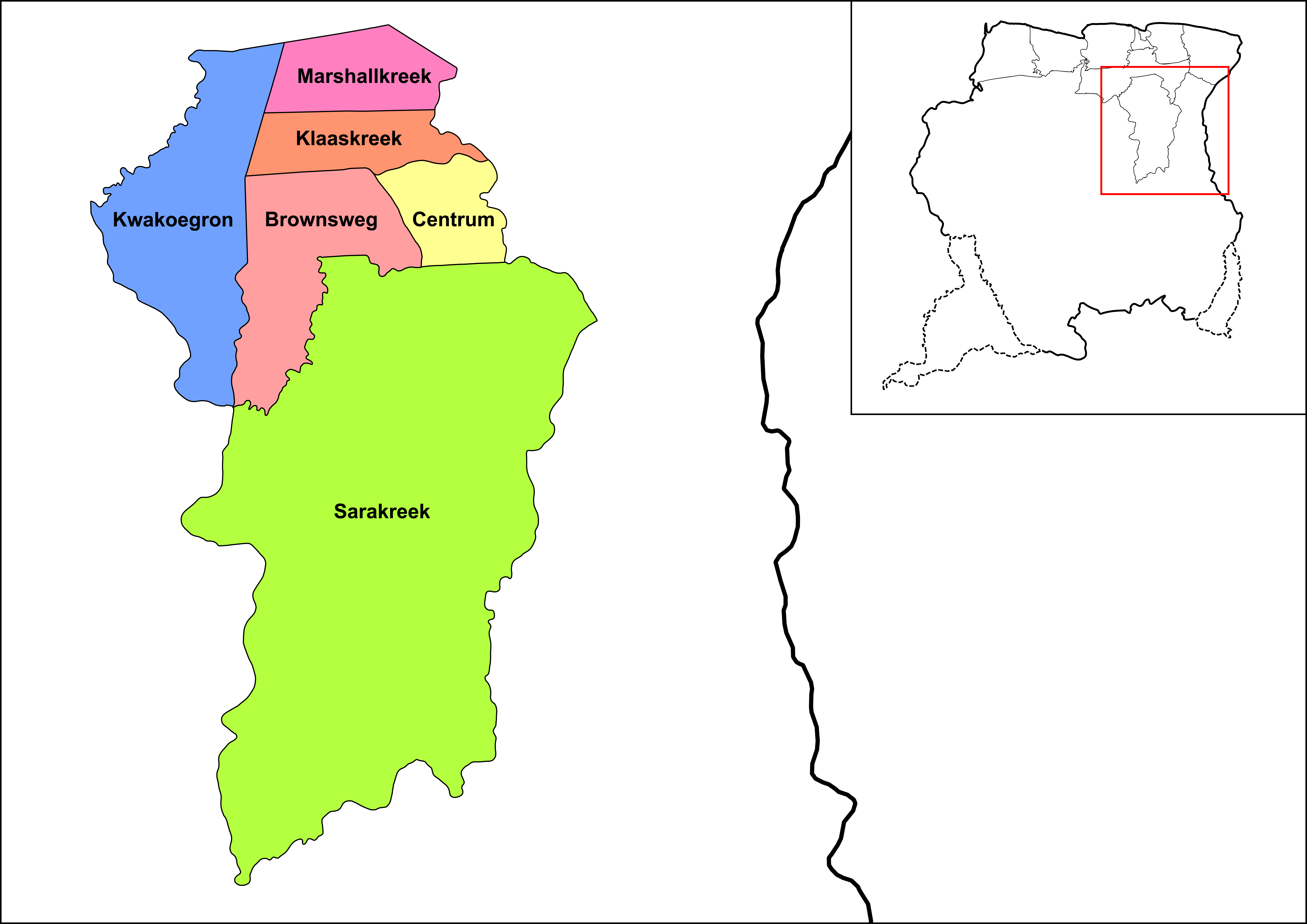
Resorts of Brokopondo

Brokopondo is divided into 6 resorts (ressorten):

- Brownsweg
- Centrum
- Klaaskreek
- Kwakoegron
- Marshallkreek
- Sarakreek

== Villages ==
- Afobaka
- Baikutu
- Berg en Dal
- Brokopondo
- Brownsweg
- Lebidoti
- Nieuw-Koffiekamp
- Nieuw-Lombe
- Zoewatta
