= Lebidoti =

Lebidoti Lebidotie (Dutch)
- Village
- Location within Suriname
- Coordinates: 4°39′47″N 54°56′50″W
- Country: Suriname
- District: Brokopondo District
- Resort: Sarakreek
- Time zone: UTC-3 (AST)

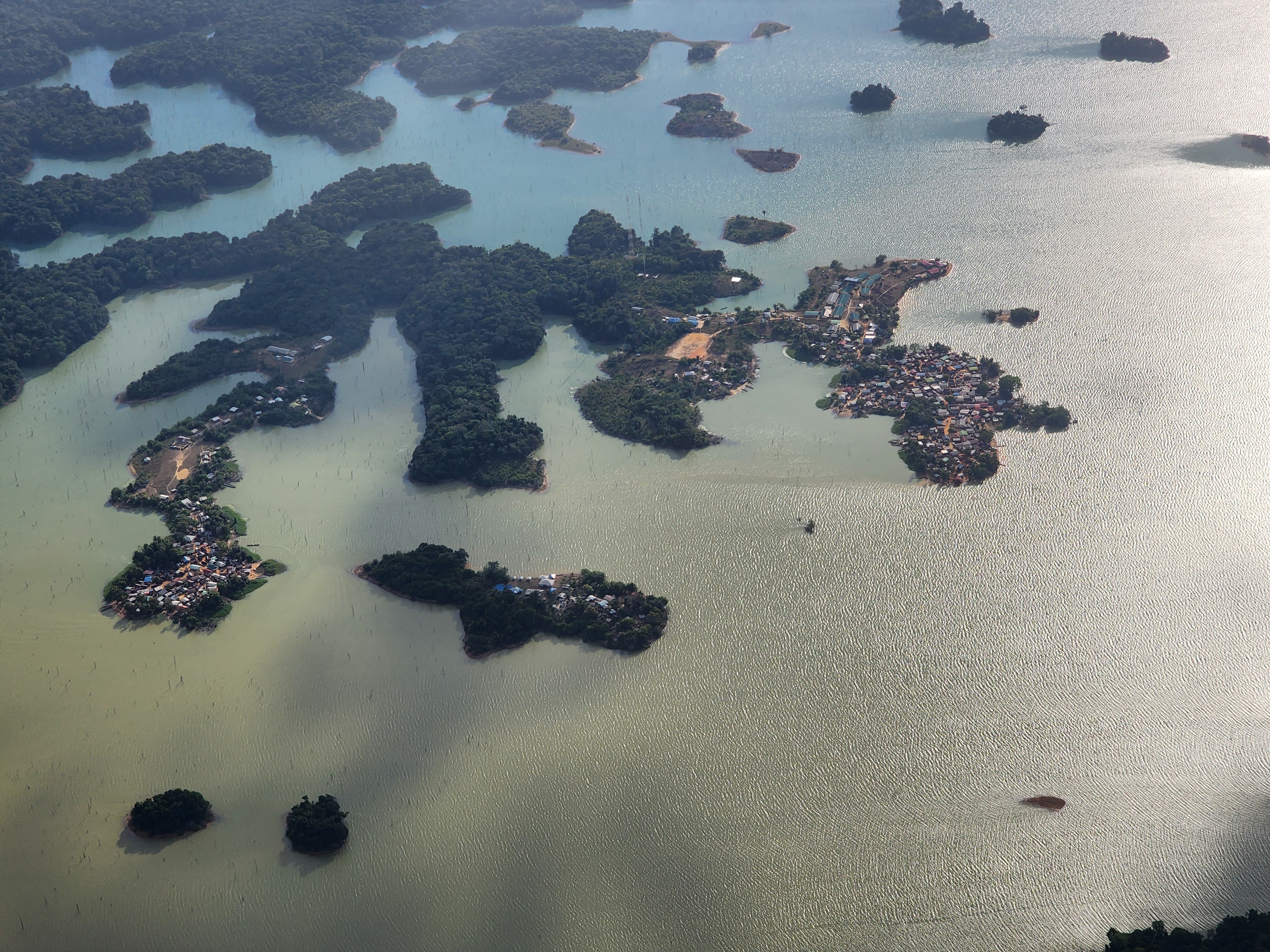
Aerial view of Lebidotie (right) and the villages of Bakoe (left), and Pisian (center) along the Brokopondo Reservoir

Lebidoti (Dutch: Lebidotie) is a village in Suriname with a population of about 1,000 and two nearby villages of Bakoe and Pitean. The people are of Maroon descent, specifically the Aukan tribe, and moved to this specific location when the building of the Afobaka dam created the Brokopondo Reservoir.

== Healthcare ==
Lebidoti is home to a Medische Zending healthcare centre.
