= Rensch =

Rensch is a German surname. Notable people with the surname include:

- Bernhard Rensch (1900–1990), German evolutionary biologist and ornithologist
- Daniel Rensch (born 1985), American chess master
- Devyne Rensch (born 2003), Dutch footballer
- Katharina Rensch (born 1964), German gymnast
- René Rensch (born 1969), German rowing cox
- Ronald Rensch (1966–2021), German sailor
- Stanley Rensch (1940–2024), Surinamese human rights activist

== See also ==
- Rensch's rule, biological rule on allometrics
- Rentsch, surname
