= Rentsch =

Rentsch is a surname. Notable people with the surname include:

- Franz Rentsch (born 1943), Swiss rower
- Ingrid Rentsch (1928–2022), German actress
- Ivana Rentsch (born 1974), Swiss musicologist and teacher

== See also ==
- Rensch, surname
