= Maria Heyde =

- Maria Heyde (1911)
- Born: Maria Elisabeth Hartmann; 19 April 1837; Paramaribo, Surinam
- Died: 6 April 1917 (aged 79); Schönebeck, Germany
- Occupations: missionary, translator

Maria Elisabeth Heyde, née Hartmann, (19 April 1837 in Paramaribo - 6 April 1917 in Schönebeck) was a Surinamese-born German missionary, diarist and translator.

== Life ==
Heyde was the daughter of Johann Gottlieb Hartmann and Maria Hartmann, German Moravian missionaries who were based in Suriname. At the age of seven, the family moved to Germany, where Maria attended the Moravian Brethren boarding school in Kleinwelka. After finishing her studies she began a post teaching at the same school. At the age of 22, Heyde travelled to Tibet (now northern India) with missionary August Wilhelm Heyde, whom she married in Kyelang, in Lahaul province, now Himachal Pradesh in November 1859. The couple settled in Kyelang and raised a family with three children (four had died).

Frequently alone with the locals, with her husband off on long missionary journeys, Heyde learned to speak and write in Tibetan. She documented her life in her diaries, writing about her husband's travels, local customs and agricultural practices, and a knitting school which she established for girls. She taught the girls how to weave and knit, and enforced a strong code of personal hygiene. She returned to Germany with her husband in 1893 after a 44-year period in Tibet, and translated two books of Moses into Tibetan. After the death of her husband, she relocated to Gnadau to live near her son Paul's family, and died on 6 April 1917 at his home in Schönebeck.
