= Centrium =

Centrium may refer to:

- Peavey Mart Centrium, Red Deer, Canada
- The Centrium, Hong Kong
- Television House, formerly The Centrium, London, England

== See also ==
- Centrio
- Centrum (disambiguation)
