= Ganzee =

Ganzee Gansee
- Former village
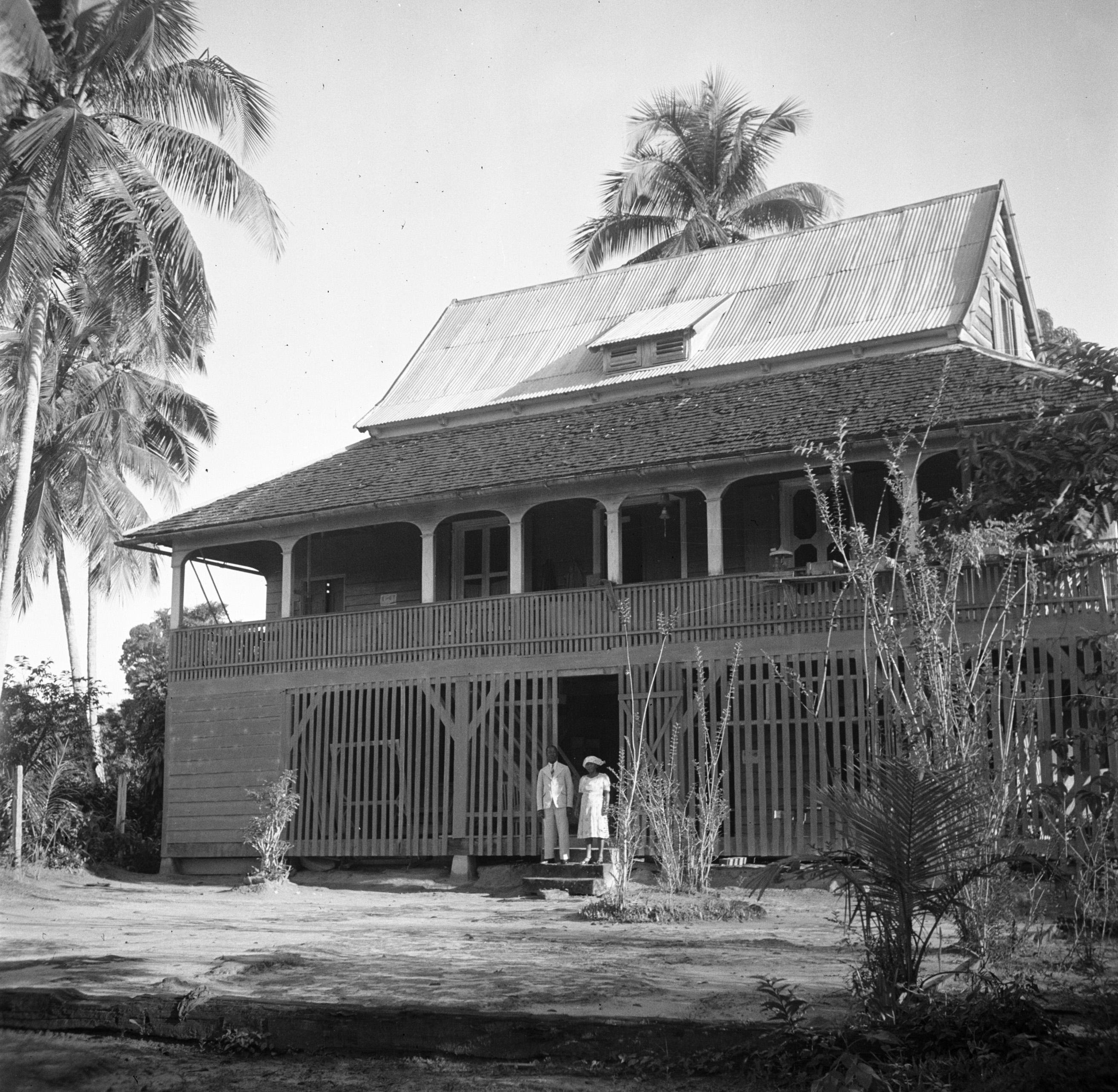
- The teacher and his wife in front of their house in Ganzee (1947)

- Location within Suriname
- Coordinates: 4°50′N 55°6′W
- Country: Suriname
- District: Brokopondo District

Population (1960)
  - Total: circa 1,200
- Time zone: UTC-3 (AST)

Ganzee (also Gansee) is a former village in the Brokopondo District of Suriname. The village was home to Maroons of the Saramaka tribe, and located on the Suriname River. In 1965, the village was flooded after the construction of the Afobaka Dam.

== History ==
The village was founded in the interior of Suriname by runaway slaves. From 1765 onwards, the Moravian Church embarked on missionary activities among the maroons. First the focus was on converting people. In 1850, the first school in the interior was opened in Ganzee. In 1919, the village had a population of about 500 people and was the capital of the Upper Suriname district. In 1931, a clinic was established in the village.

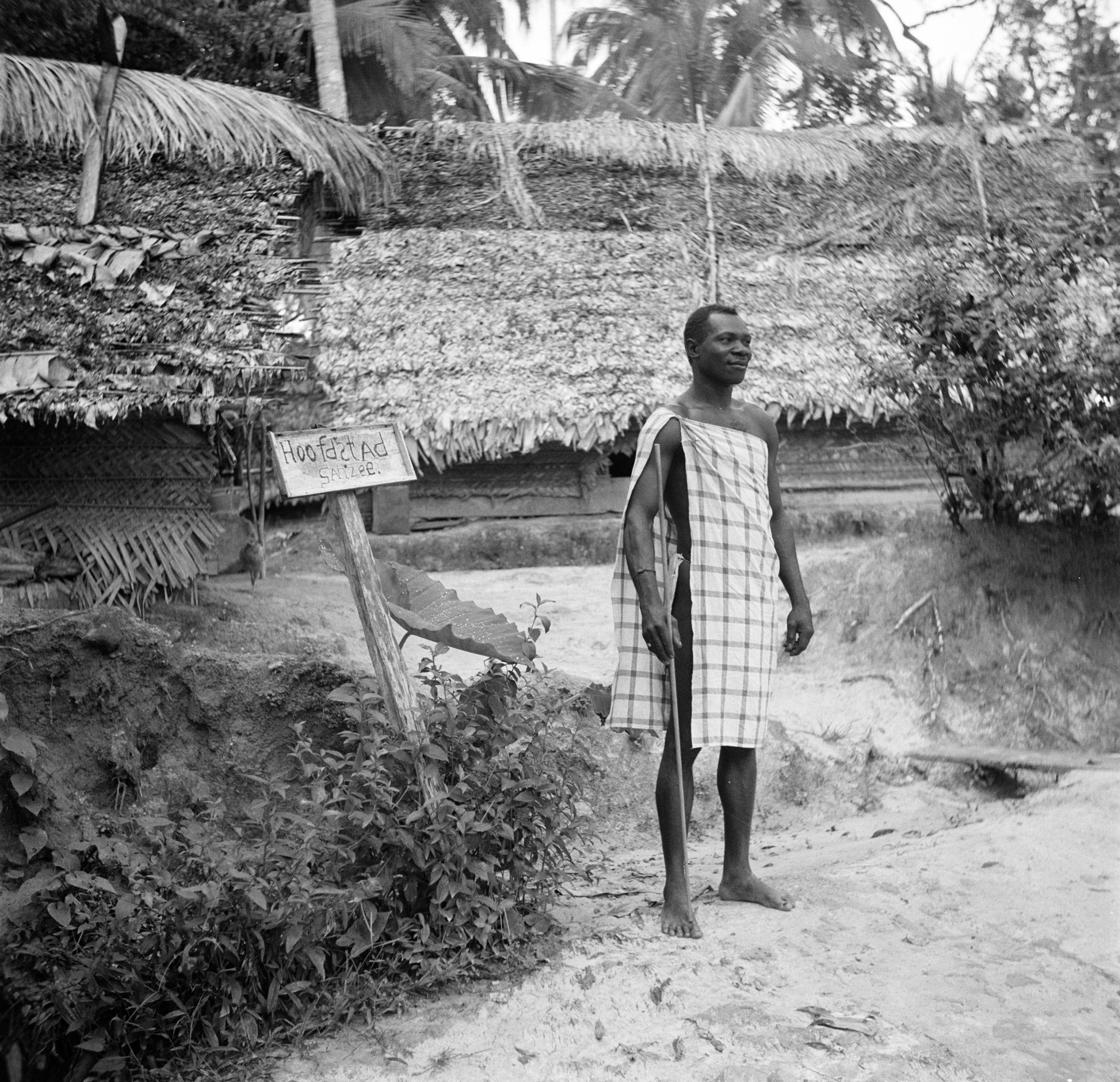
Captain Masra standing next to the sign "Hoofdstad Ganzee" (Capital Ganzee)

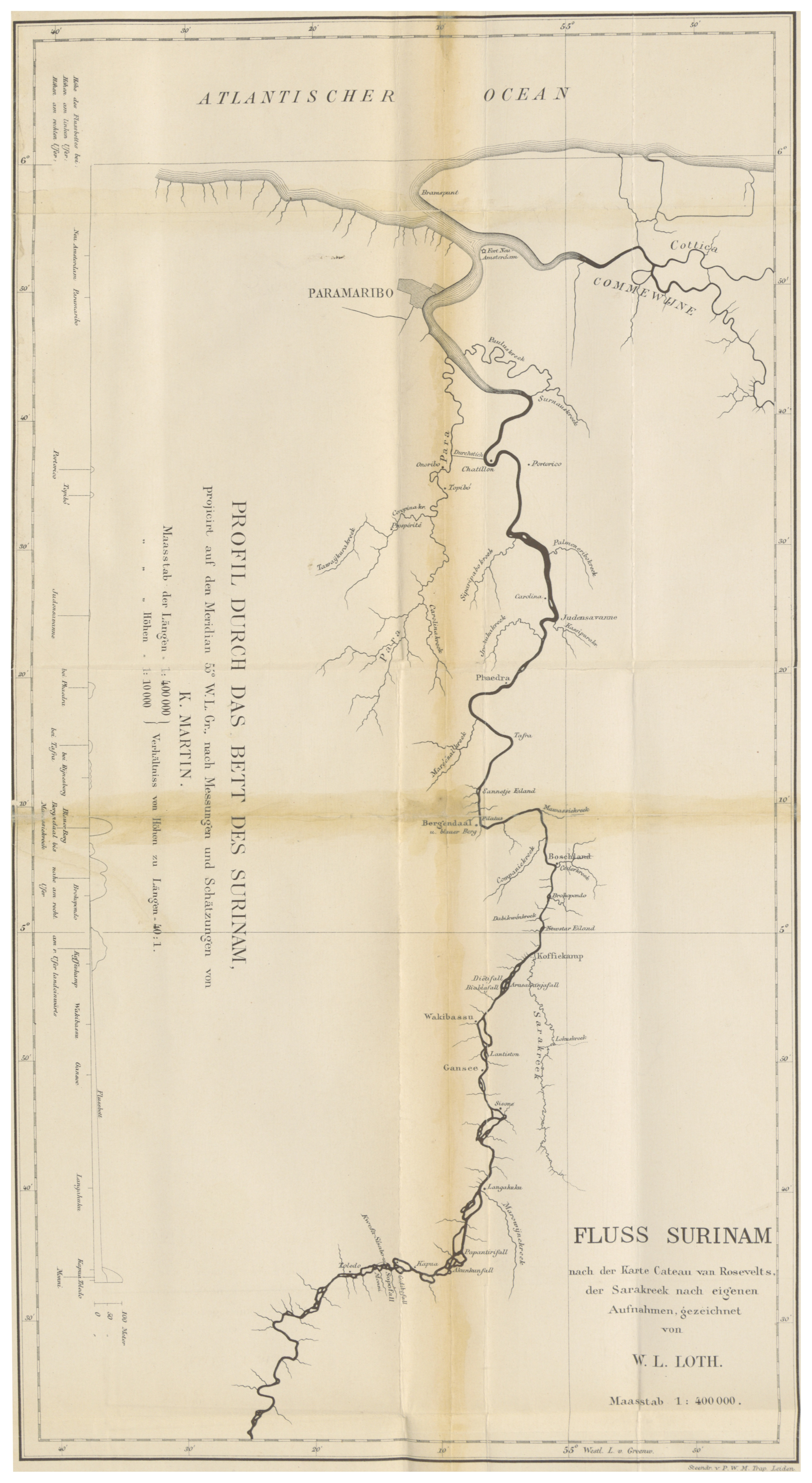
Map of the Suriname River showing Ganzee (1877)

In 1958, plans were developed to create the Afobaka Dam in order to provide electricity for the aluminium industry. The damming of the Suriname River would lead to the Brokopondo Reservoir, and flood the village of Ganzee. With an estimated 1,200 people, Ganzee was the biggest village in the area. In 1964, the villagers were transmigrated to Klaaskreek and Nieuw-Ganzee.

== See also ==
- Stanley Rensch – Surinamese human rights activist (1940–2024), born in Ganzee
