= Stanley Rensch =

Surinamese human rights activist (1940–2024)

- Born: Ettiré Stanley Nestor Rensch; 18 April 1940; Ganzee, Suriname
- Died: 10 November 2024 (aged 84); Paramaribo
- Occupation: Human rights defender

E. Stanley Rensch (18 April 1940 – 10 November 2024) was a Surinamese human rights activist.

== Life ==
Born in Ganzee on 18 April 1940, Rensch moved to the Netherlands in 1960, where he studied pedagogy in Utrecht. After his studies, he returned to Suriname in 1973 and worked at the Ministry of Education and Community Development. His goal was to improve the education system in the run-up to the country's independence.

After the 1980 Surinamese coup d'état and the subsequent 1982 December murders, Rensch became an outspoken critic of the military regime led by Dési Bouterse. In 1987, Rensch founded the human rights organization Moiwana '86, named after the 1986 Moiwana massacre during the Surinamese Interior War. With this organization, he documented human rights violations and offered support to victims and their families.

Rensch died in the Surinam capital Paramaribo on 10 November 2024, at the age of 84.
