= Klaaskreek =

- Resort
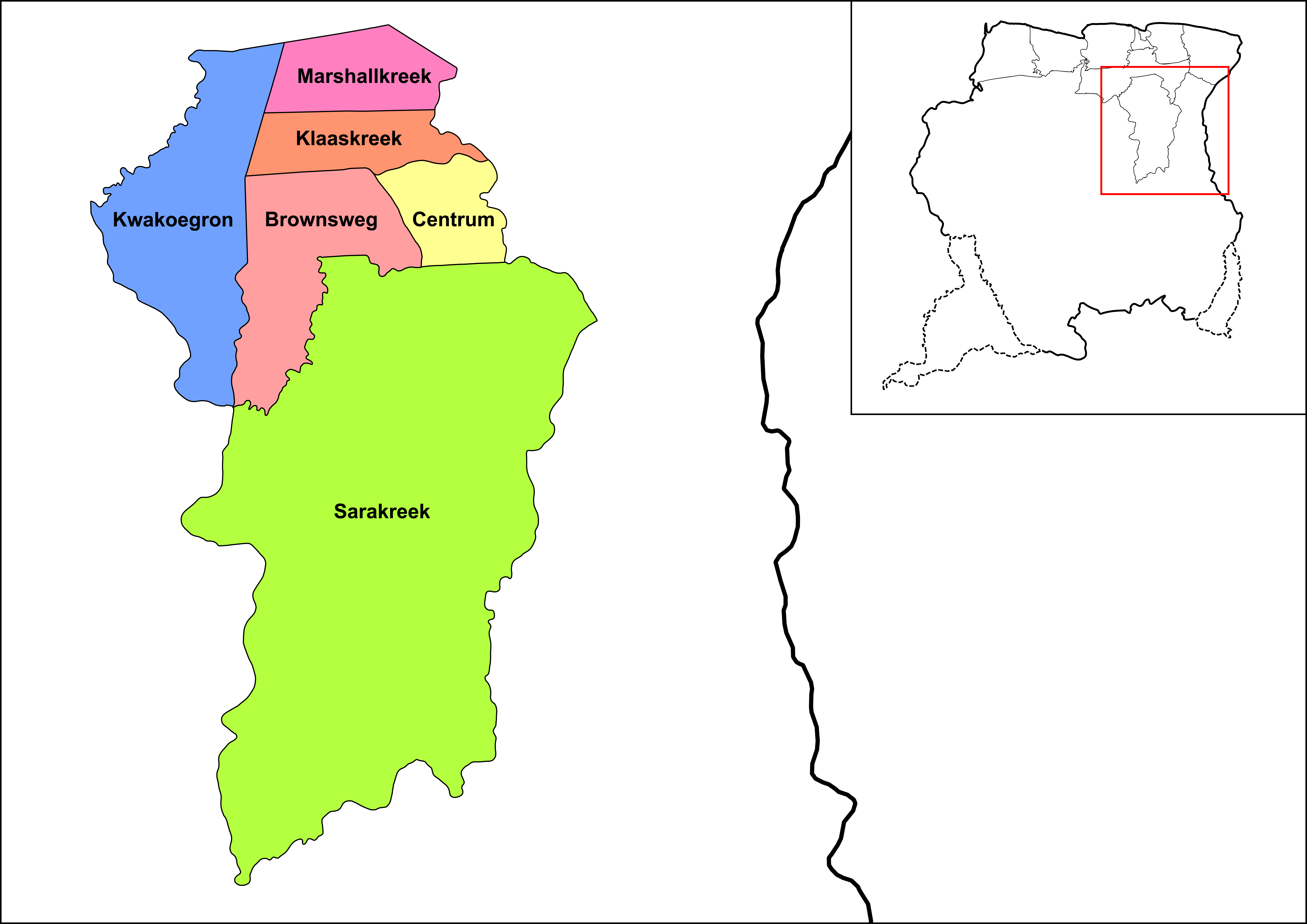
- Map showing the resorts of Brokopondo District. Klaaskreek
- Coordinates: 5°10′50″N 55°4′35″W
- Country: Suriname
- District: Brokopondo District

Area
  - Total: 349 km^{2} (135 sq mi)

Population (2012)
  - Total: 2,124
  - Density: 6.09/km^{2} (15.8/sq mi)
- Time zone: UTC-3 (AST)

Klaaskreek is a resort in Suriname, located in the Brokopondo District. Its population at the 2012 census was 2,124. Located northeast of Brokopondo, the main town is Reinsdorp. In 2007, a technical training centre in biological agriculture was established at Klaaskreek to teach locals about enhancing agriculture in the area.

== History ==
Around 1860 an expedition led by J. Rosenberg set out to discover gold. Even though some gold was discovered near Victoria, the government decided not to pursue the matter. Rosenberg however persisted, established the New-York and Surinam Company, and finally received a concession in 1870. The company failed to meet its objectives, and the concession was nullified in 1874.

Klaaskreek is situated in the proximity of the Brokopondo Reservoir. In 1958 Klaaskreek was designated as one of the transmigration towns for the inhabitants of the area that was flooded after the construction of the Afobaka Dam, and the main settlement for people from Ganzee. Klaaskreek is a tribal area mainly inhabited by Maroons.

Klaaskreek has a school, police station, civil engineering company., river resort, and a beach called Benastrand. Medische Zending operates a clinic in the town.

== Towns ==
Other villages in the resort include Berg en Dal, Kapasikélé, Njun Lombe, Mujékiki, and Reinsdorp. In 1960, an agriculture pilot project was started in Brokobaka, Centrum. The project led to a palm oil plantation and factory in the former plantation of Victoria. however the Surinamese Interior War and lethal yellowing resulted in the closure of the factory in 1996.
