= Zoewatta =

- Location in Suriname
- Coordinates: 4°31′32″N 55°18′49″W
- Country: Suriname
- District: Sipaliwini
- Resort (municipality): Boven Suriname

Zoewatta is a village in the Boven Suriname municipality (resort) in Sipaliwini District in Suriname. It is located on Brokopondo Reservoir.

Nearby towns and villages include Wittikamba (3.6 nm), Baikutu (1.0 nm) Adawai (7.3 nm) and Abenaston (7.2 nm).
