= Centra (disambiguation) =

Centra is a chain of convenience stores in Ireland.

Centra may also refer to:

- Centra (anatomy), the plural of centrum, the central part of a vertebra
- Centra Gas Manitoba, an energy supplier in Canada
- Centra, a margarine company among those merged in 1927 to form Margarine Unie

== See also ==
- Nissan Sentra, a 1982–present Japanese compact car
