= Centrum, Luleå =

Centrum
- Residential area
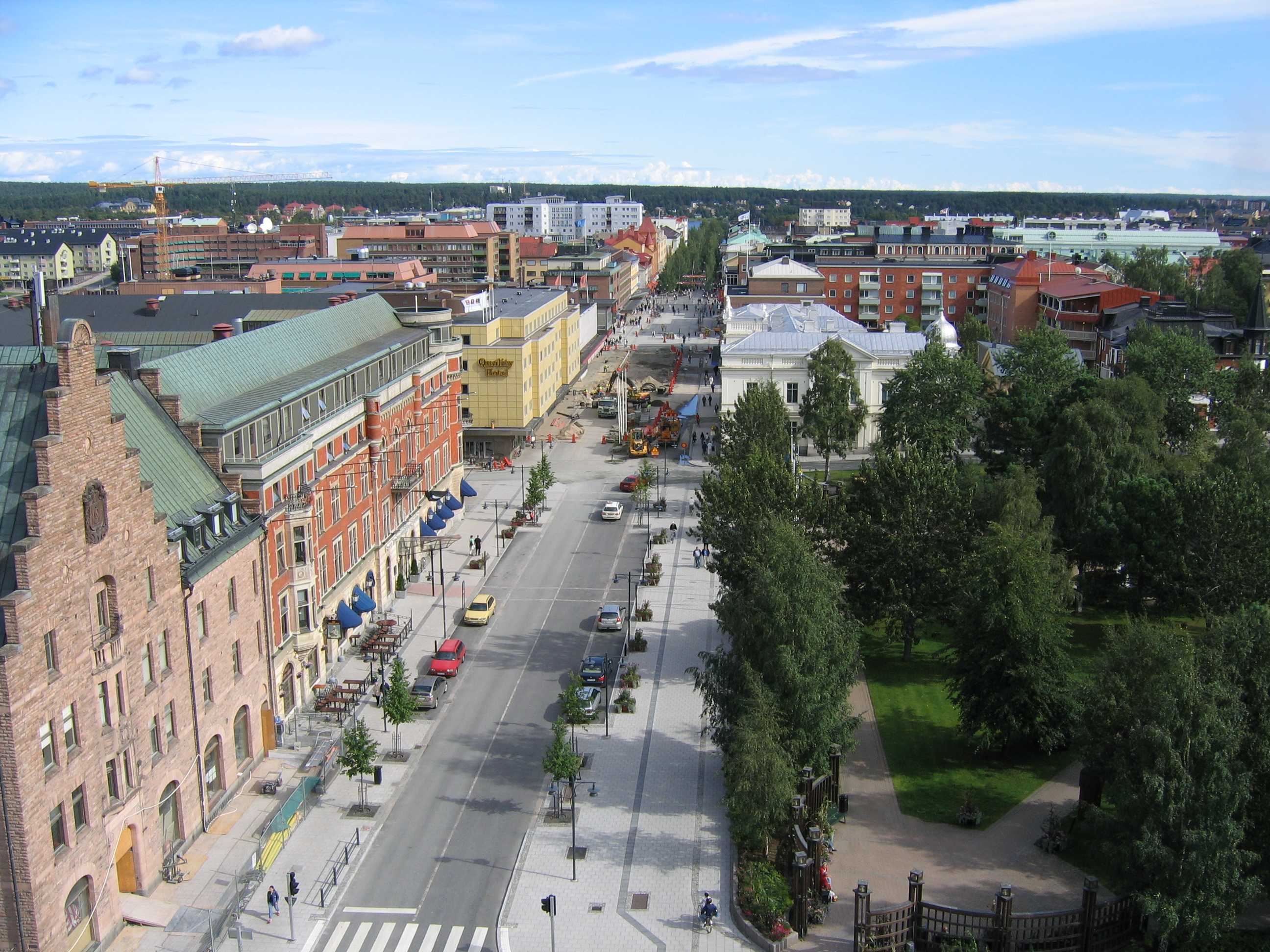

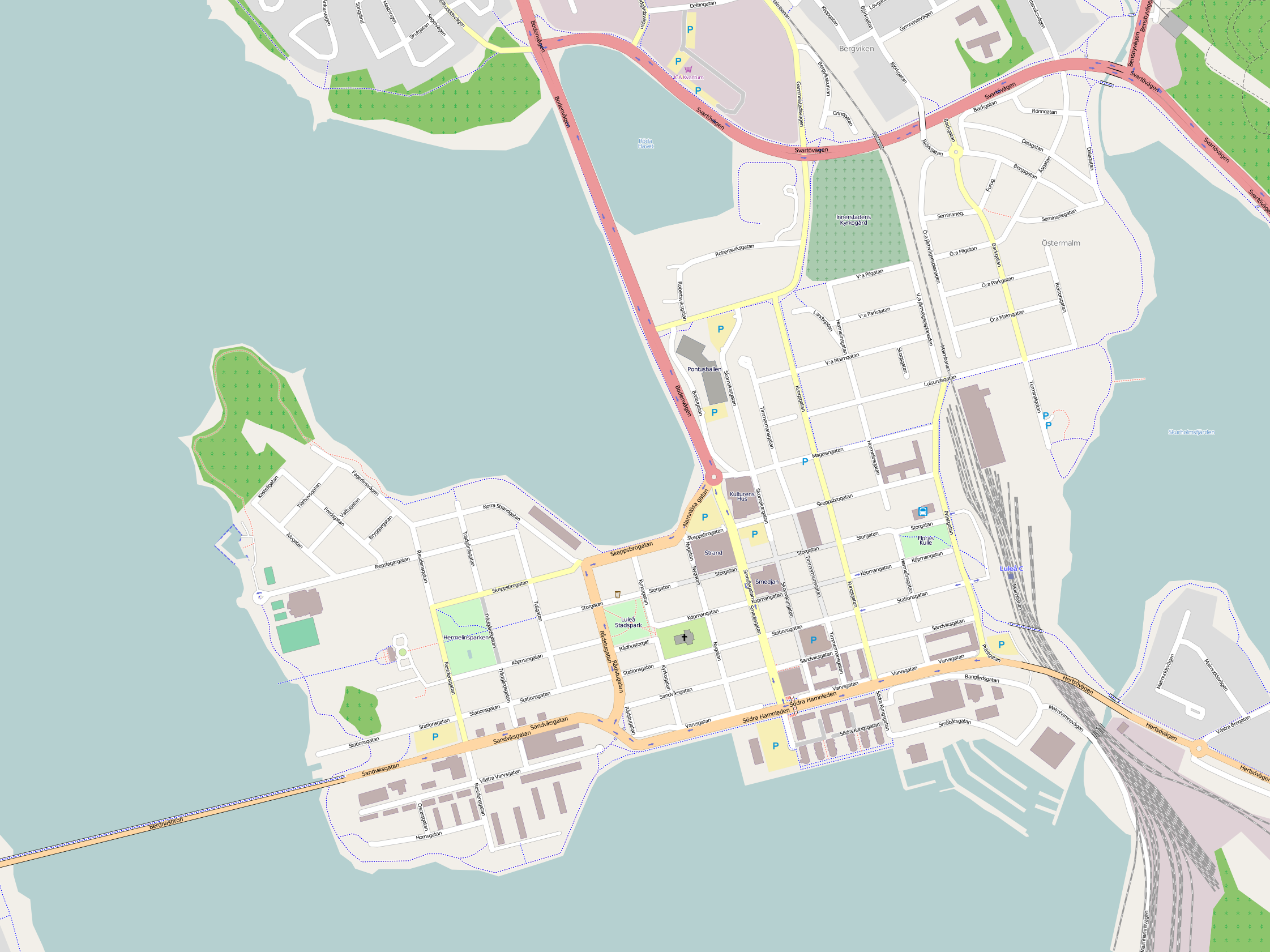
- Coordinates: 65°35′00″N 22°09′00″E
- Country: Sweden
- Province: Norrbotten
- County: Norrbotten County
- Municipality: Luleå Municipality

Population (2010)
  - Total: 7,760
- Time zone: UTC+1 (CET)
  - Summer (DST): UTC+2 (CEST)

Centrum is a residential area in Luleå, Sweden. It had 7,760 inhabitants in 2010.
