= Centrum Arena =

Centrum Arena may refer to several sports venues:

- Centrum Arena (Utah), the home of the Southern Utah University Thunderbirds
- Centrum Arena (Prestwick), the home of the Ayr Scottish Eagles
