= Centrum, Brokopondo =

Centrum
- Resort
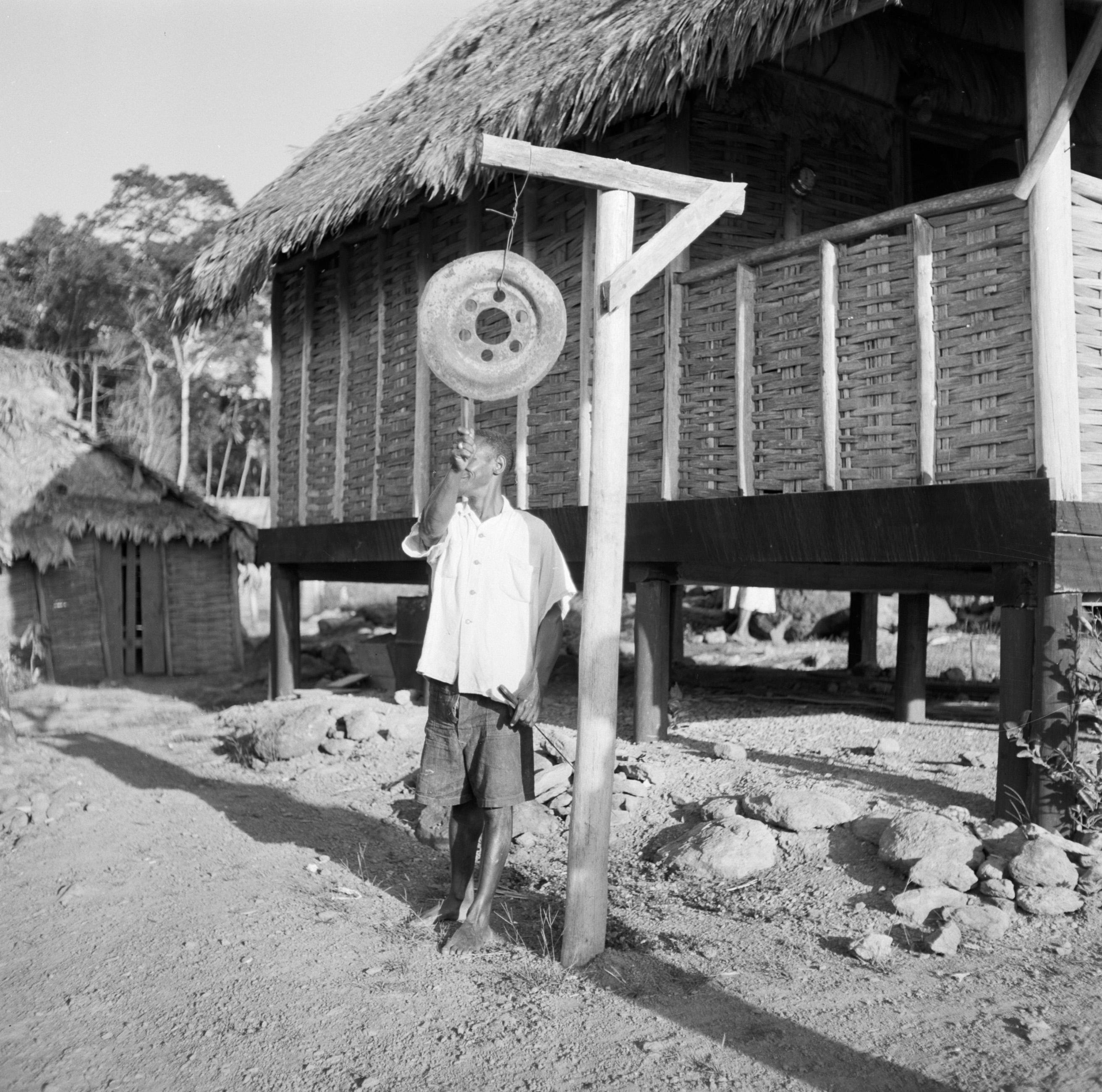
- Brokopondo (1955)

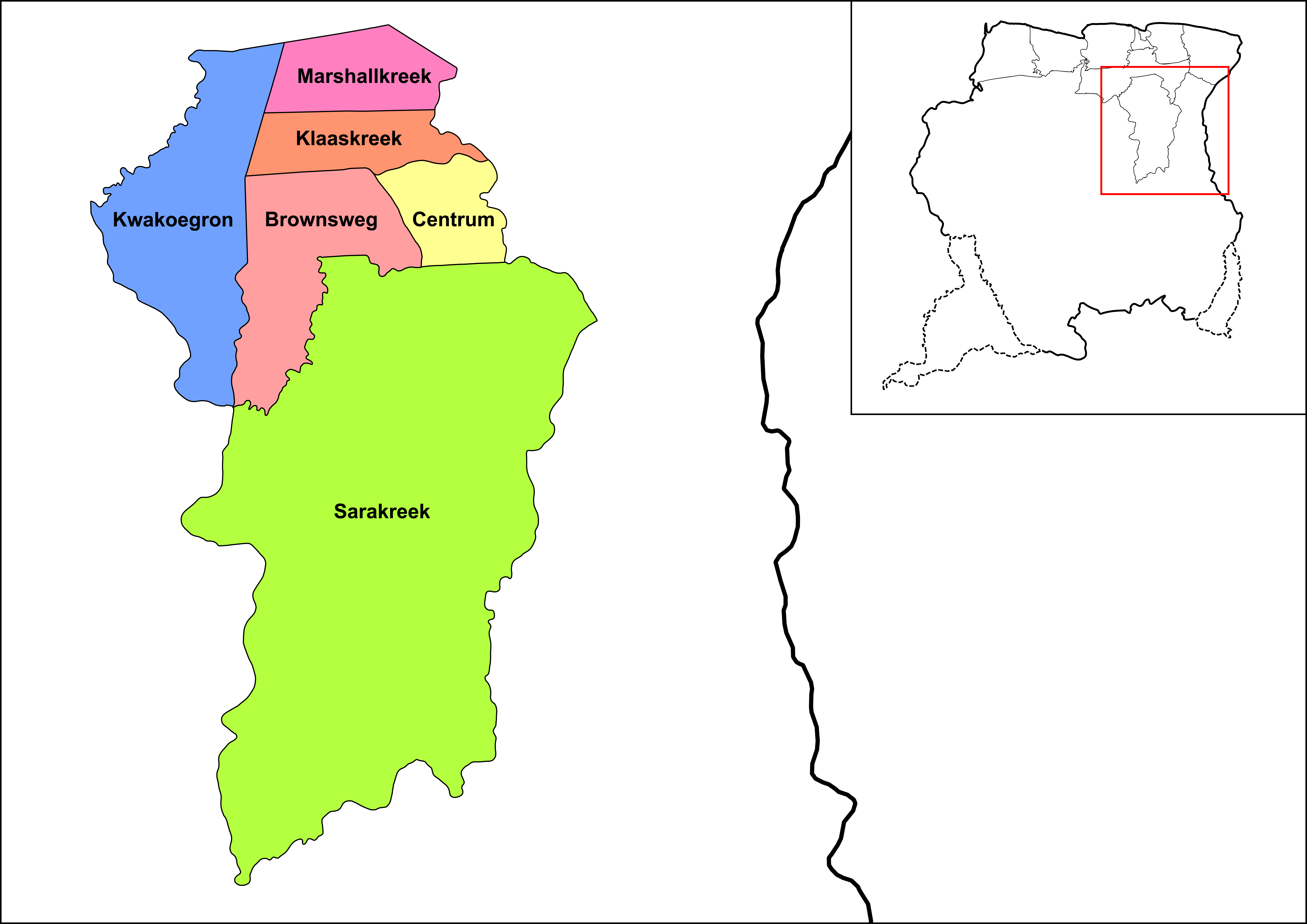
- Map showing the resorts of Brokopondo District. Centrum
- Coordinates: 5°4′N 54°58′W
- Country: Suriname
- District: Brokopondo District

Area
  - Total: 314 km^{2} (121 sq mi)
- Elevation: 72 m (236 ft)

Population (2012 census)
  - Total: 4,482
  - Density: 14.3/km^{2} (37.0/sq mi)
- Time zone: UTC-3 (AST)
- Climate: Af

Centrum is a resort in Suriname, located in the Brokopondo District. Its population at the 2012 census was 4,482. Centrum can be reached by car via the Avobakaweg from Paranam to Afobaka, or by boat via the Suriname River.

== Towns ==
The main town in the Centrum resort is Brokopondo which is also the capital of the Brokopondo District. Afobaka is located in the resort. There are several other tiny villages which are still tribal: Asigron, Baling Soela, Boslanti, Compagniekreek, Drepada, and Tapoeripa.

In 1960, an agriculture pilot project was started in Brokopondo and the village created for the project was named Brokobaka after Brokopondo and Afobaka. The project lead to a palm oil plantation and factory in Victoria, Klaaskreek. however the Surinamese Interior War and lethal yellowing resulted in the closure of the factory in 1996.
