= Centrum, Umeå =

Centrum
- Residential area
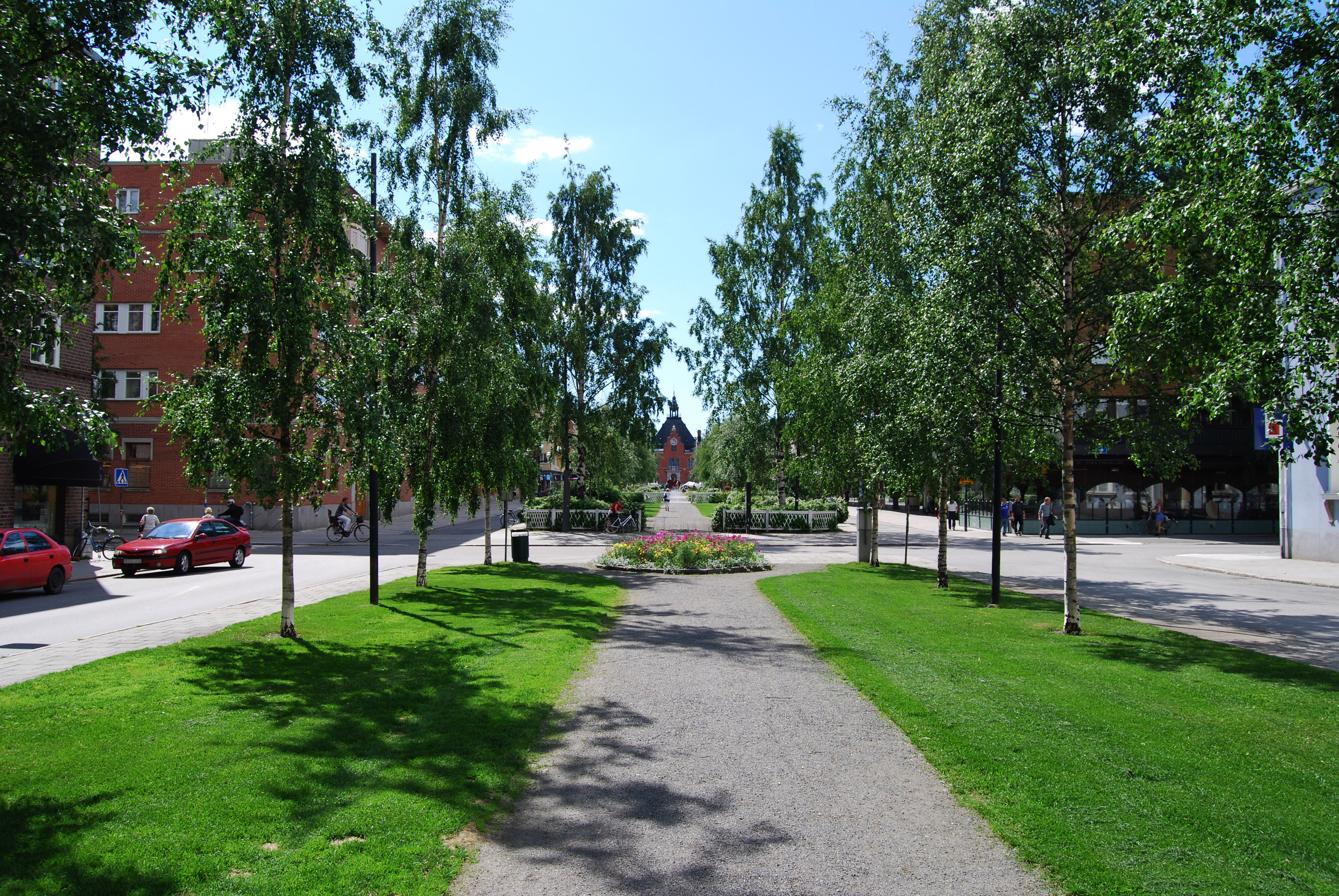
- Rådhusesplanaden
- Interactive map of Centrum
- Coordinates: 63°49′37″N 20°15′52″E
- Country: Sweden
- Province: Västerbotten
- County: Västerbotten County
- Municipality: Umeå Municipality
- Time zone: UTC+1 (CET)
  - Summer (DST): UTC+2 (CEST)

Centrum is a residential area in Umeå, Sweden.

== Description ==
Centrum has a skate park, Sparken, adjacent to the Hamnmagasinet and Ume River. The park was finished in 2009 and was then the first part of a major infrastructural project in Umeå reshaping large parts of the city center, called the "City between the bridges" (Staden mellan broarna). The park won the Swedish Association of Architects Upper Norrland's Architecture Prize in 2012. The park is around 20 meters wide and 120 meters long. The park's name, which translates to The kicker in English, came from a contest.

== Images ==
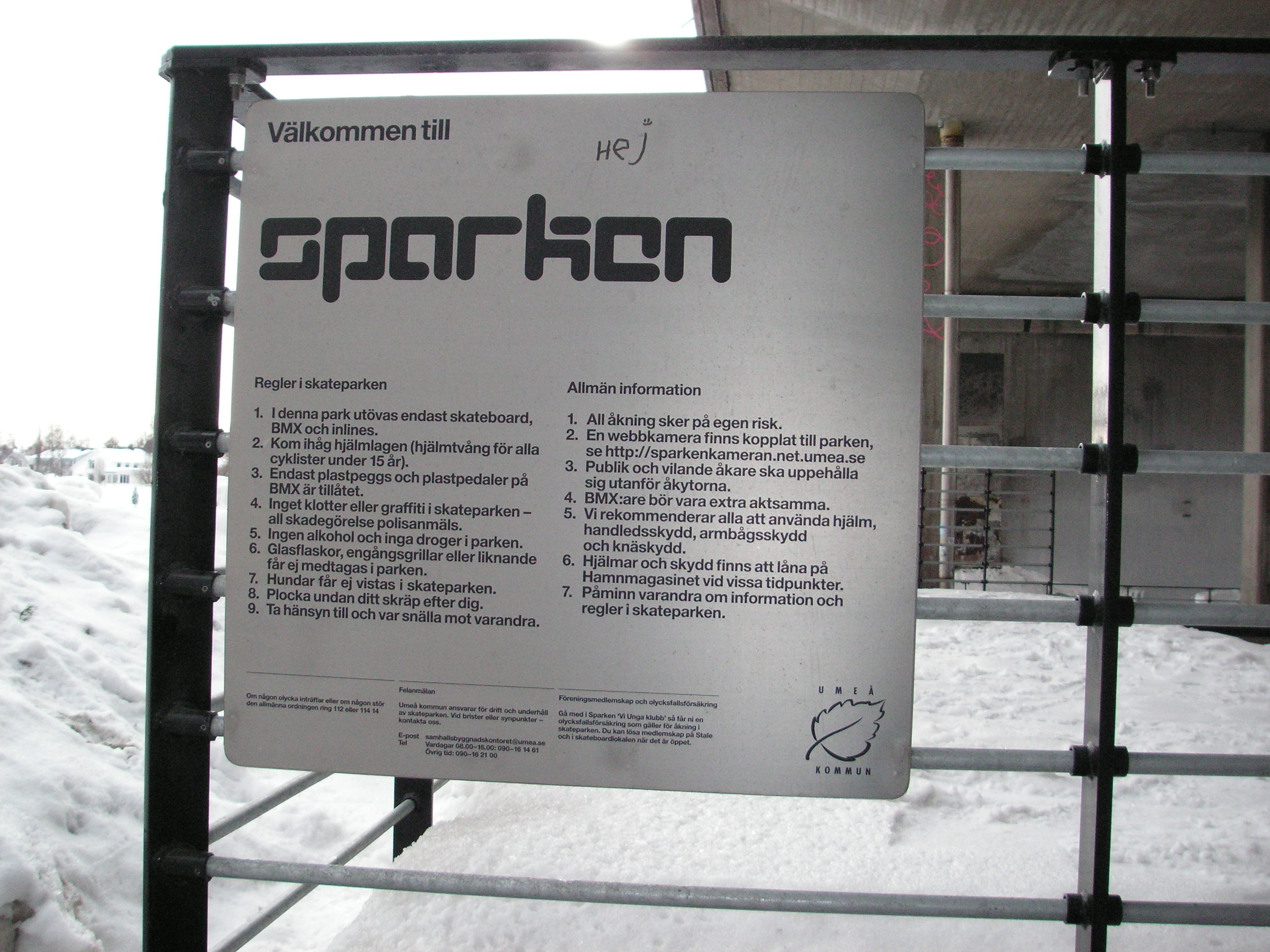
A welcome sign with the rules to use the park.

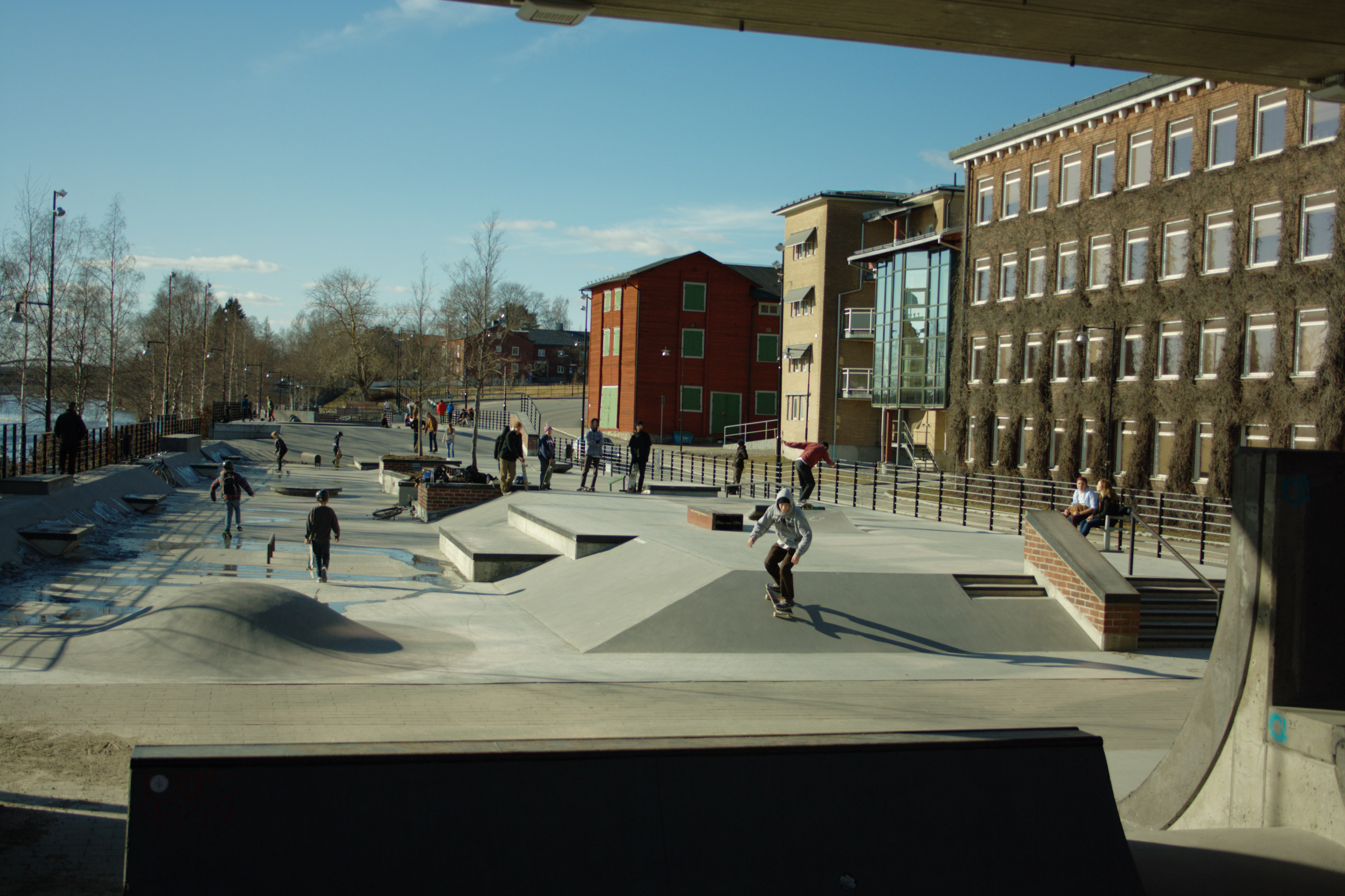
Sparken photographed in March 2014.

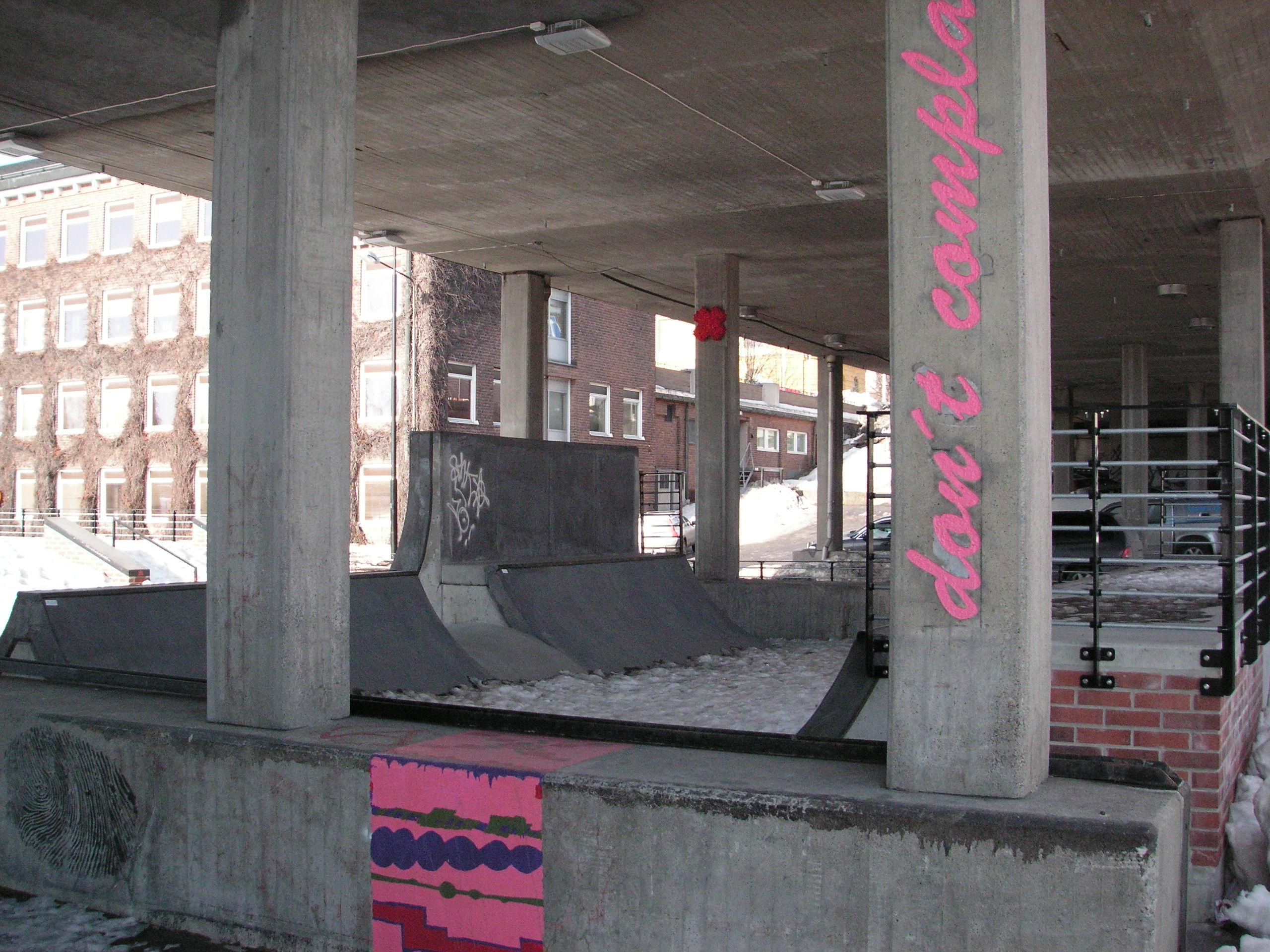
Sparken during the winter of 2011.

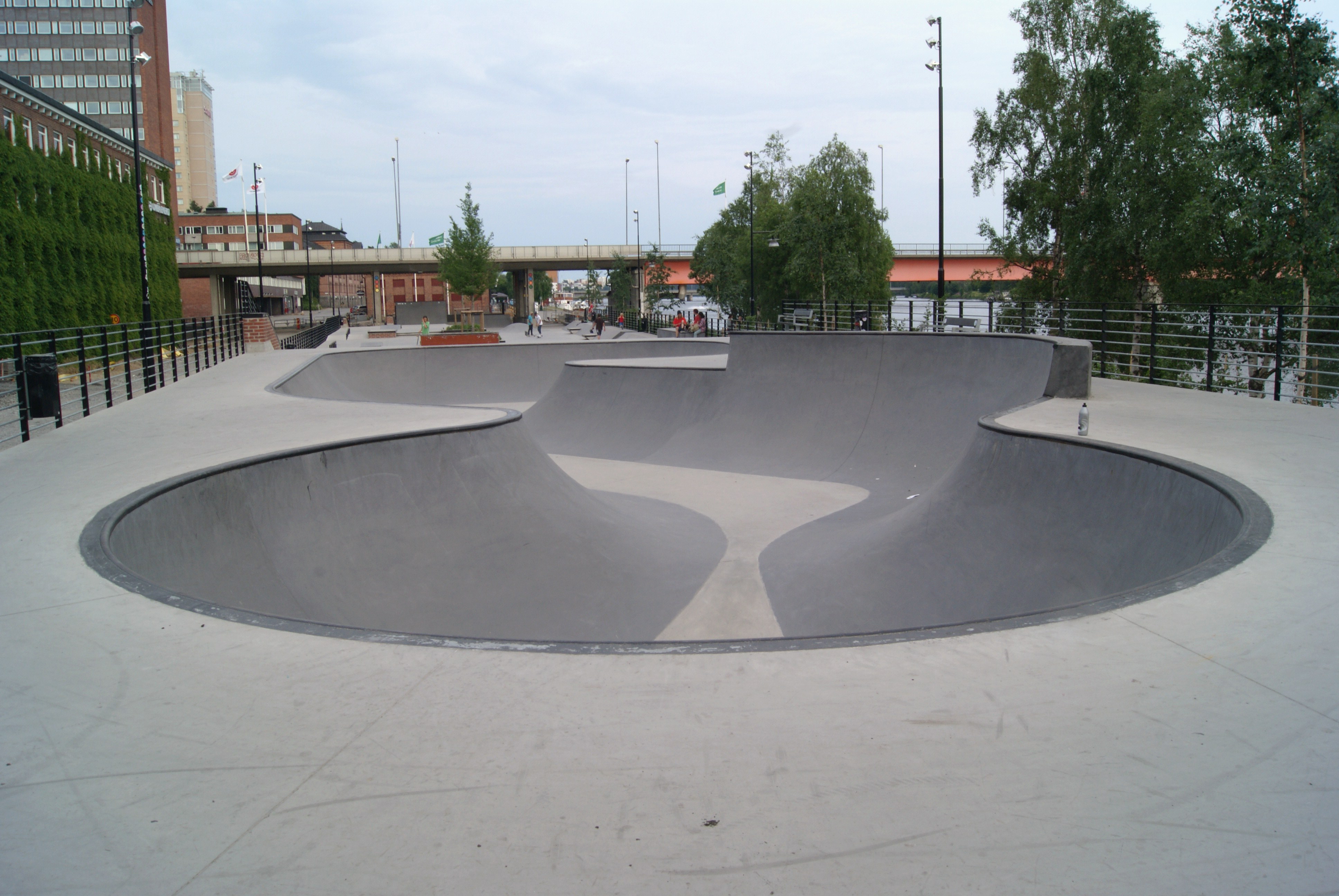
Sparken during the summer of 2011.
