= Roads in Suriname =

There are several named highways in the country of Suriname.

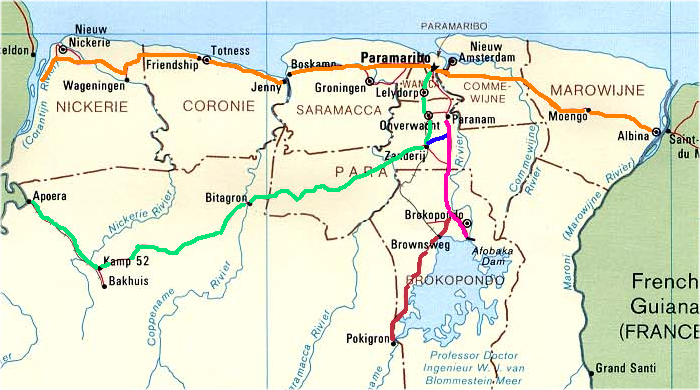
Main roads in Suriname: East-West Link / Southern East-West Link; Desiré Delano Bouterse Highway: Avobakaweg / Ghaama Agbagoweg

Main roads in Suriname

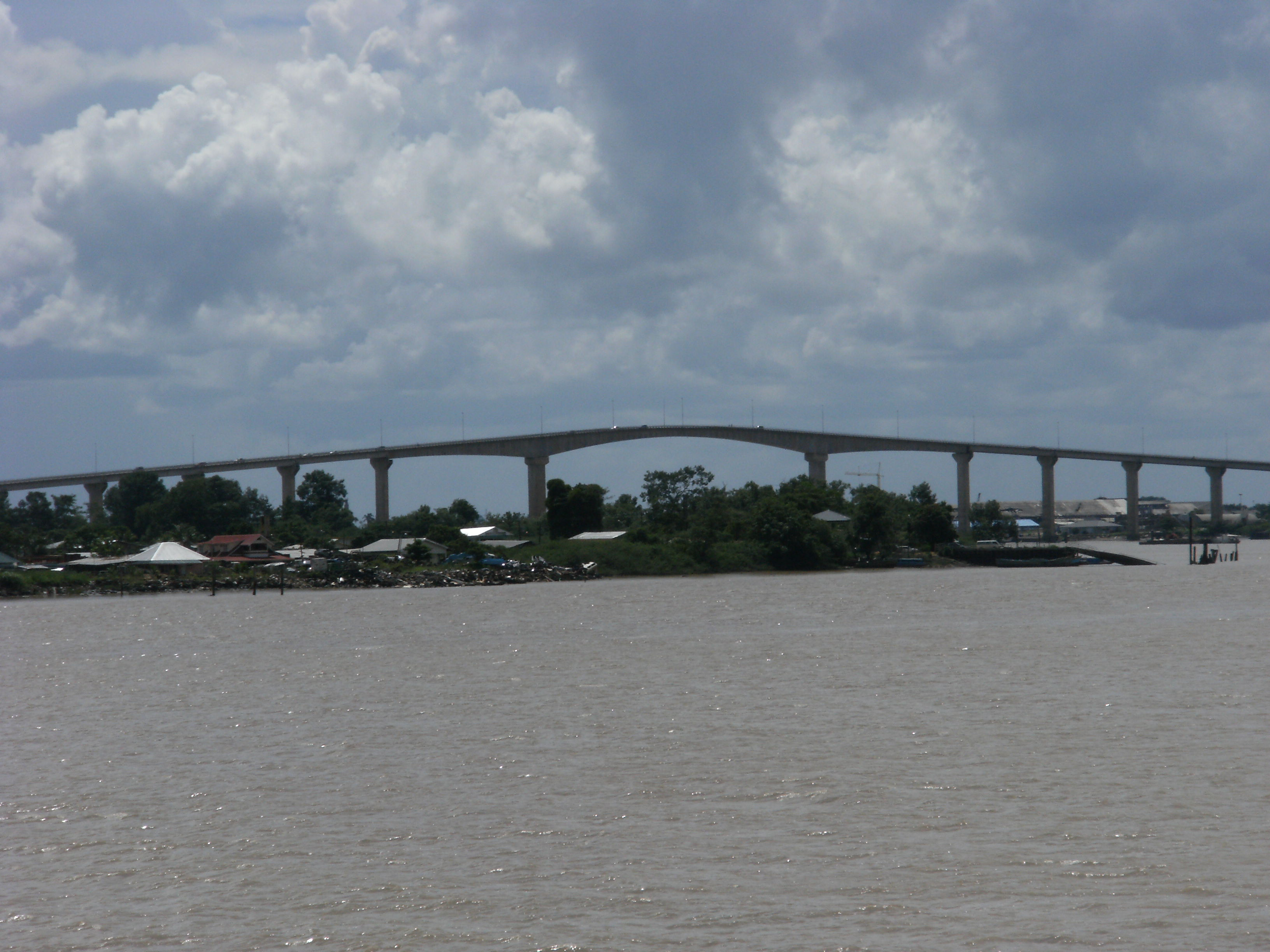
The Jules Wijdenbosch Bridge over the Suriname River near Paramaribo.

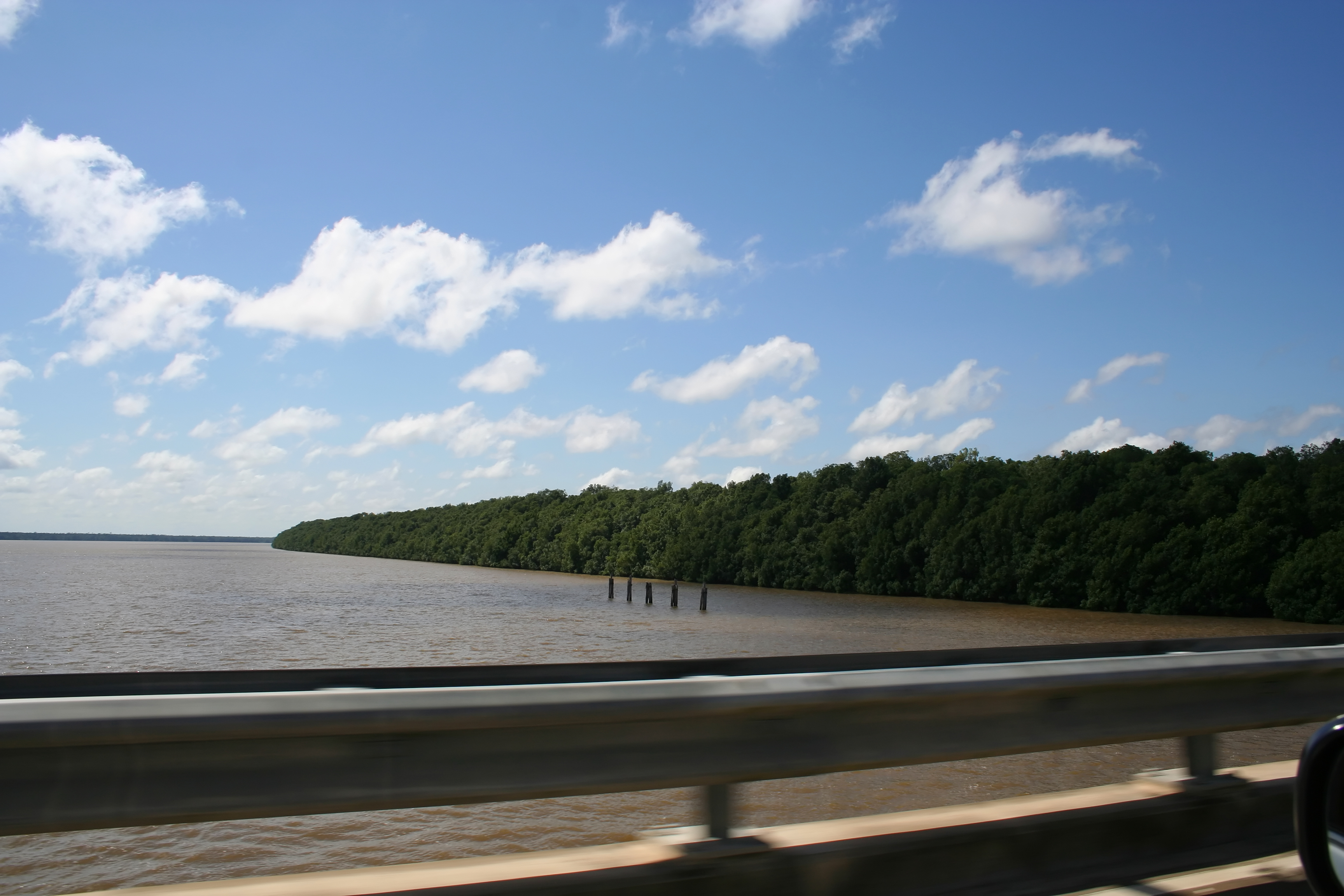
The Coppename Bridge over the Coppename River near Boskamp.

== Avobakaweg ==
The Avobakaweg is a paved 2-lane road connecting Paranam with Afobaka, the location of the Afobaka Dam. The road connects northwards to Paramaribo and the East-West Link. The Avobakaweg has two major branches: One paved branch leads to Brokopondo, and another paved branch leads to Pokigron via Brownsweg. The previous name Afobakaweg was changed in September 2022 to Avobakaweg

== Desiré Delano Bouterse Highway ==
On 15 May 2020, the Desiré Delano Bouterse Highway opened, and is the first motorway of Suriname, providing a faster connection between Paramaribo and the Johan Adolf Pengel International Airport.

== East-West Link ==
A major road is the 2-lane East-West Link connecting Albina to Nieuw Nickerie. The road was fully paved on 17 December 2009. There is a Southern East-West Link connecting Paramaribo with Apoera via Bitagron, however it is mainly unpaved. This road is border to border, however a ferry is needed because there are no bridges.

== Statistics ==
- total: 4,304 km (2003)
- paved: 1,119 km (2003)
- highway: 9.6 km (2020)
- unpaved: 3,174 km (2003)

NOTE: Driving is on the left. Suriname and its neighbour Guyana are the only two countries on the (in-land) American continent which drive on the left.

== Road links with adjacent countries ==
- Guyana - Yes, ferry from Nieuw-Nickerie to Corriverton.
- Brazil - None.
- (France) French Guiana - Yes, ferry from Albina to Saint-Laurent-du-Maroni.
