= Afobaka =

- Village
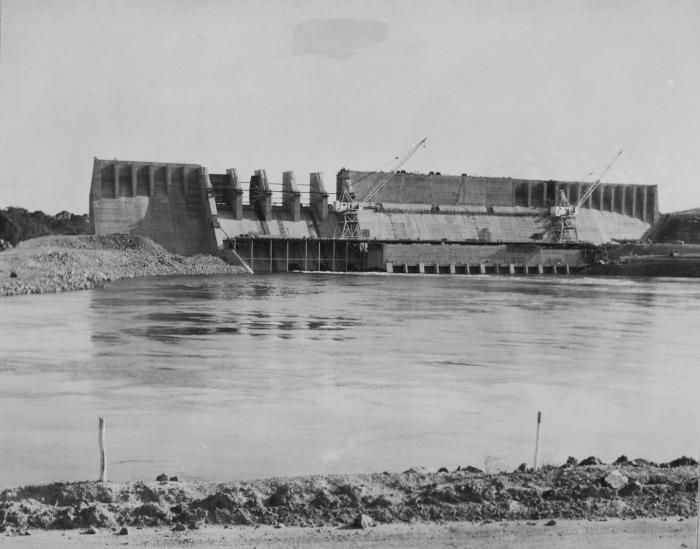
- Afobaka Dam under construction in 1963. Finished 1984

- Location in Suriname
- Coordinates: 4°59′N 54°59′W
- Country: Suriname
- District: Brokopondo District
- Resort (municipality): Sarakreek

Afobaka is a village in the Brokopondo District of Suriname. Between 1960 and 1964, the 1913 meter-long Afobaka Dam was built on the Suriname River, creating the Brokopondo Reservoir. The Afobaka Airstrip is nearby.

== Healthcare ==
Afobaka is home to a Medische Zending healthcare centre.
