= Afobaka Dam =

Dam in Brokopondo District, Suriname

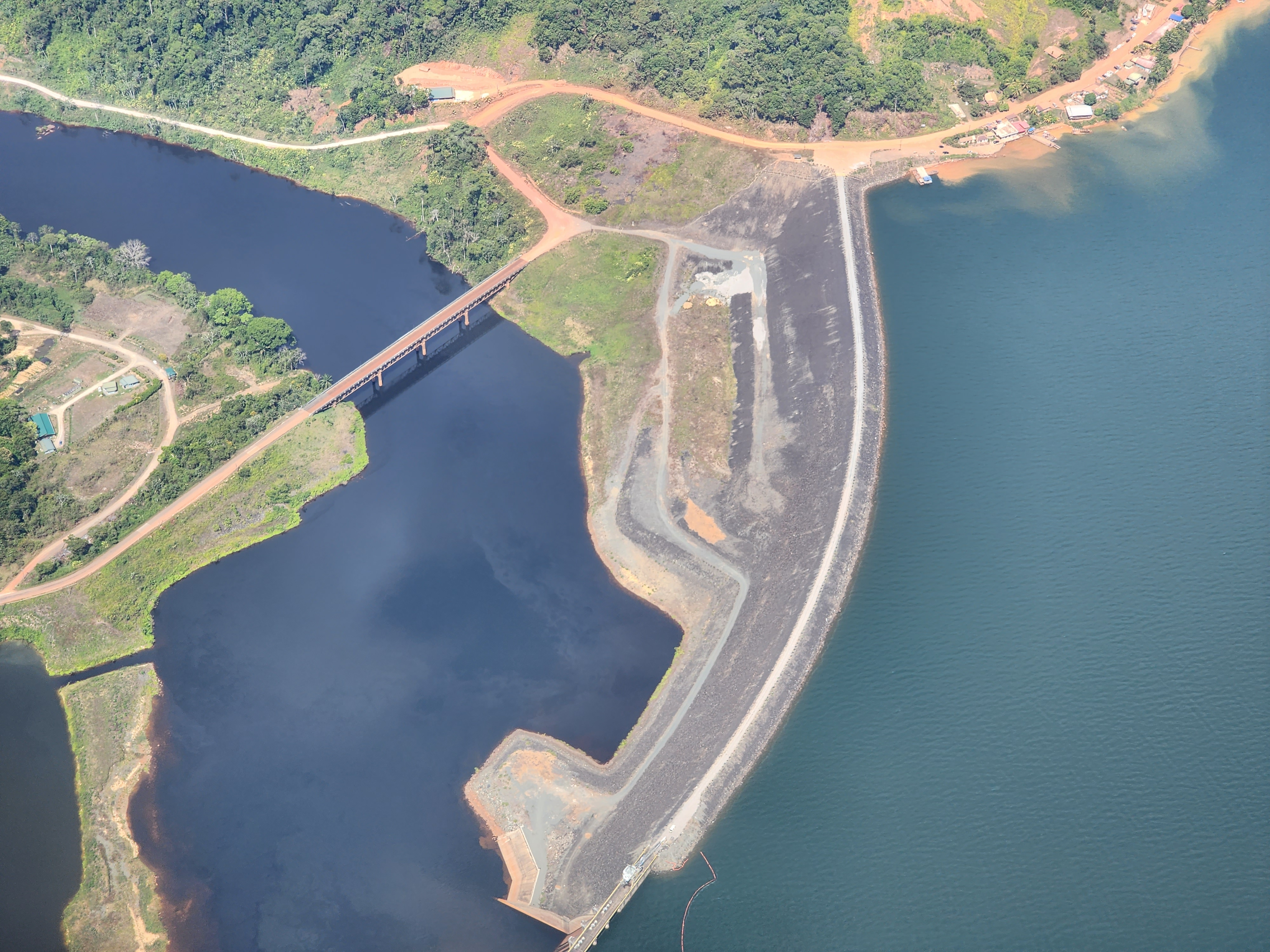
- Hydroelectric power station at base of dam

- Location within Suriname
- Country: Suriname
- Location: Afobaka, Brokopondo District
- Coordinates: 4°58′56.07″N 54°59′32.10″W
- Purpose: Power
- Status: Operational
- Construction began: 1961
- Opening date: 1964; 62 years ago

Dam and spillways
- Type of dam: Embankment with gravity dam main section
- Height: 54 m (177 ft)
- Length: 1,913 m (6,276 ft)

Reservoir
- Creates: Brokopondo Reservoir
- Total capacity: 20,000,000,000 m^{3} (16,000,000 acre⋅ft)
- Catchment area: 12,200 km^{2} (4,700 mi^{2})
- Surface area: 1,560 km^{2} (600 mi^{2})

Brokopondo Krachtcentrale
- Operator: Suriname Aluminum Company LLC
- Commission date: 1965
- Turbines: 6 x 30 MW Kaplan-type
- Installed capacity: 180 MW

The Afobaka Dam is an embankment dam with a main gravity dam section on the Suriname River near Afobaka in Brokopondo District of Suriname. The primary purpose of the dam is to generate hydroelectric power and it supports a 180 MW power station. In 1958, Suriname Aluminum Company LLC (Suralco), a subsidiary of Alcoa, gained an agreement with the Suriname government to build the dam to power an aluminium smelter. Construction began in 1961 and it was completed in 1964. About 75% of power generated is used for processing aluminum, the rest is used in Paramaribo downstream. Only 10% of the profits from the aluminum processing were shared with the local inhabitants, 90% was taken by Alcoa. The power station was operational in 1965 but the very large reservoir, Brokopondo Reservoir, was not completely filled until 1971. Greenhouse gases emitted from the reservoir resulted in poor water quality for decades. Highly acidic water also damaged the power station's turbines.

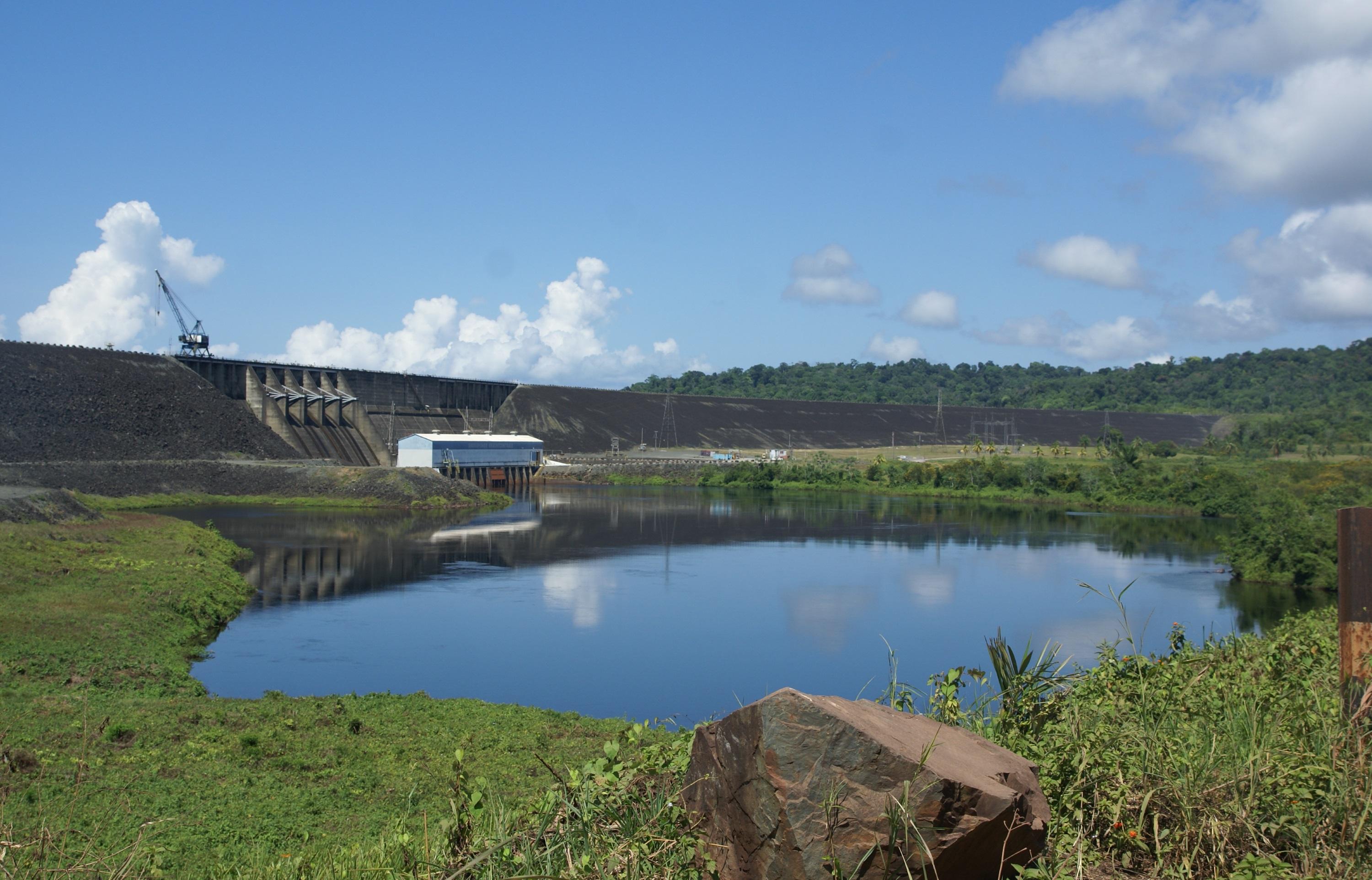

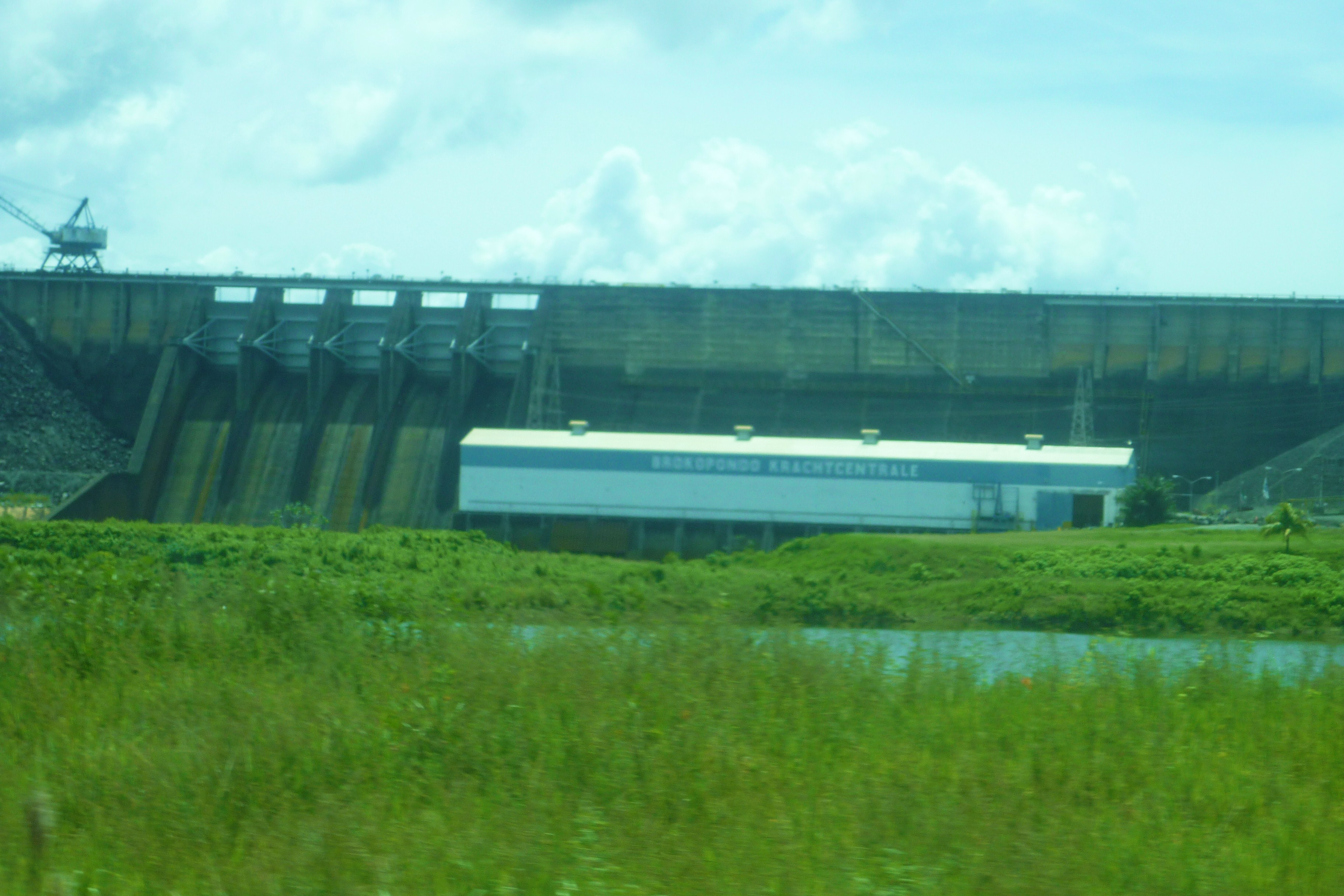

== See also ==
- Gran Olo hydroelectric power plant
- Puketi hydroelectric power plant
