= Lokaloka, Suriname =

Lokaloka Loka
- Village
- Location within Suriname
- Coordinates: 4°43′9.8″N 54°25′56.6″W
- Country: Suriname
- District: Sipaliwini District
- Resort: Pamacca

Government
  - Captain: Hendrik Ceder

Population (2015)
  - Total: 200
- Time zone: UTC-3 (AST)

Lokaloka (also: Loka) is a village of Paramacca maroons in the Sipaliwini District of Suriname. The village is located on an island in the Marowijne River. Lokaloka is the last village of the Paramacca people.

== History ==
The inhabitants of Lokaloka originate from about 150 slaves who escaped plantation Molhoop around 1830. The maroons were led by Da Asede who founded Lokaloka as their settlement. The island measures 500 by 100 metres. It is almost completely built up, and has been extended on the river bank on the Surinamese side. About 150 people live on the island, another 50 have settled on the river bank.

== Overview ==
Lokaloka has a school, but no clinic, and is dependent on Nason. There is a supermarket and an overnight stay on the bank. Electricity is provided by Diesel generators. There is no clean drinking water. The village has mobile phone access.

Lokaloka can only be reached by boat, and is located about 2 hours from Langatabiki. Plans have been developed to extended the road at Snesiekondre to Lokaloka.

Hendrik Ceder was the captain (village chief) in 2016.

== Bibliography ==
- Development Plan (2017). "Pamaka Ontwikkelingsplan" (PDF) (in Dutch). NIKOS.
