= Diitabiki =

Village and island in the Tapanahony Resort of Suriname

Drietabbetje Eastern Maroon Creole: Diitabiki Sranan Tongo: Dritabiki
- Village
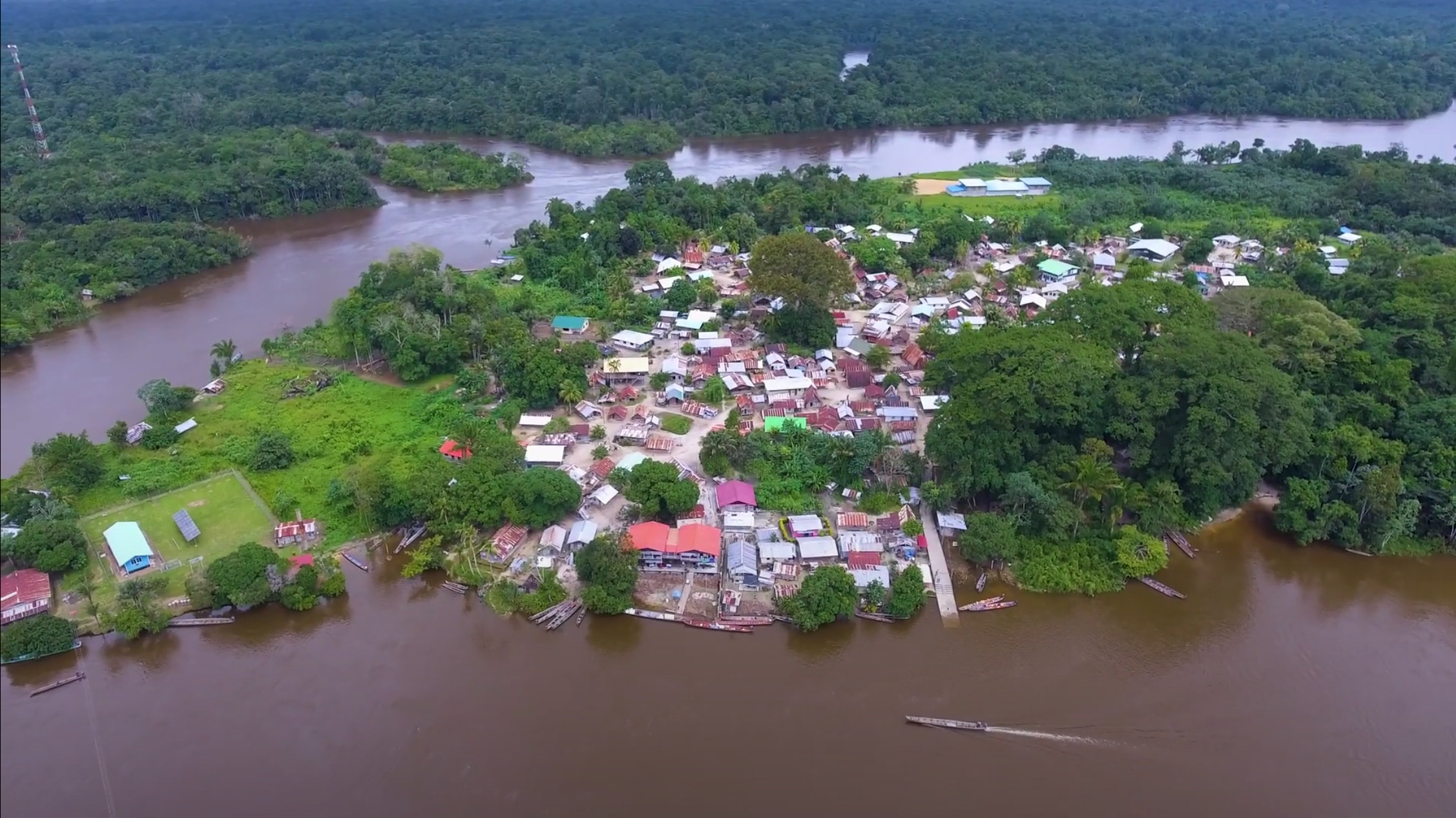
- Overview of Diitabiki in March 2020

- Location within Suriname
- Coordinates: 4°6′50″N 54°40′34″W
- Country: Suriname
- District: Sipaliwini District
- Resort: Tapanahony
- Time zone: UTC-3 (AST)

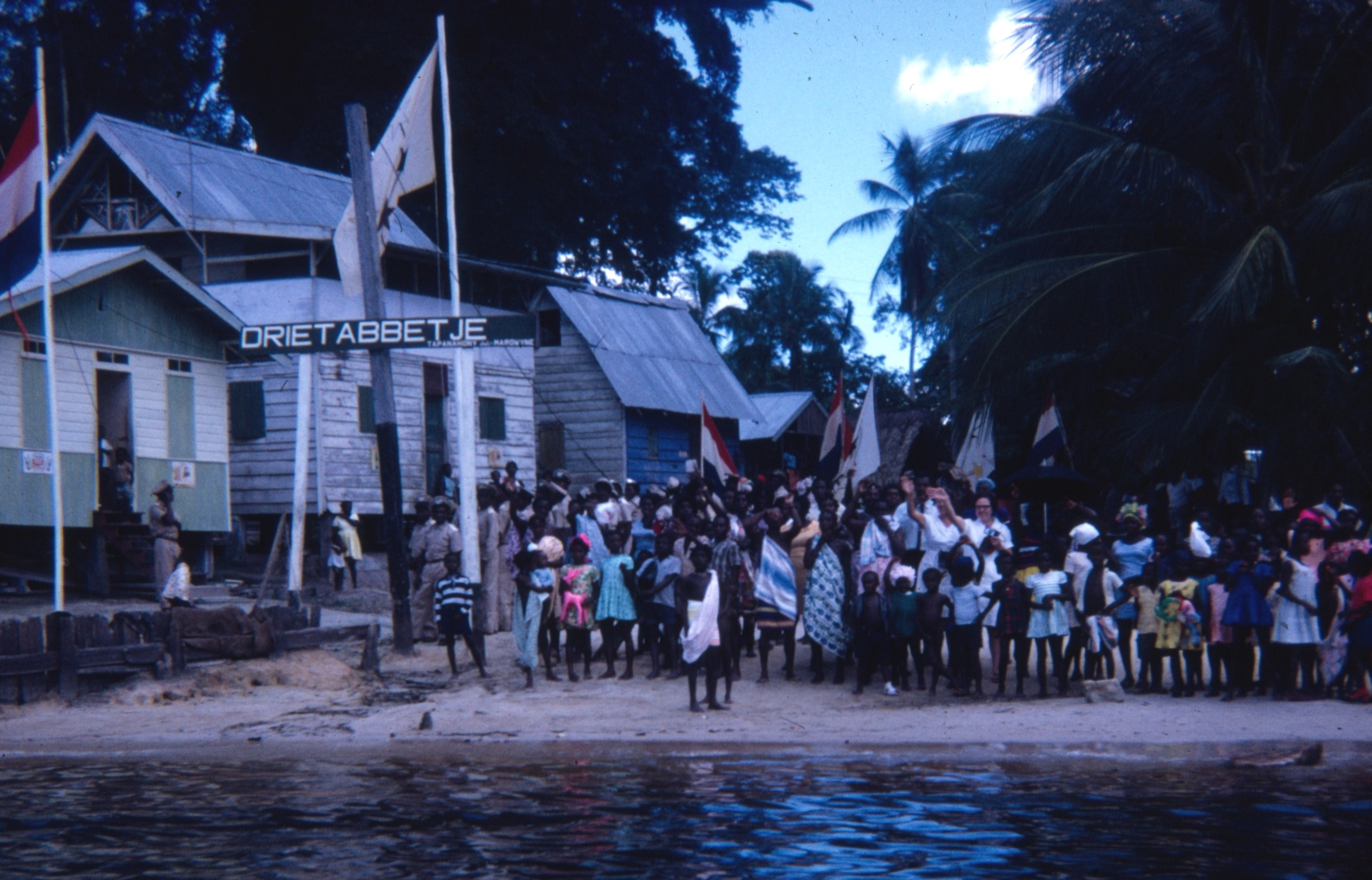
The people of Drietabbetje welcome some visitors in 1969.

Drietabbetje, also known by its Ndyuka name Diitabiki (Sranan Tongo: Dritabiki), is a Ndyuka village in the Sipaliwini District of Suriname. Diitabiki has been the residence of the gaanman of the Ndyuka people since 1950, and is the location of the oracle.

== Name ==
Both the Ndyuka and Sranan Tongo name for the village translates to "three islands," with the word tabiki meaning "island" in both languages. While drie indeed also translates as "three" in the Dutch language, the word tabbetje is a homophonic translation of the Ndyuka word.

== History ==
The Ndyuka people are of African descent, and were shipped as slaves to Suriname in the 17-18th century to work on Dutch-owned colonial plantations. The escaped slaves moved into the rainforest, and banded together. There were frequent clashes between the colonists and the Ndyuka, however in 1760, a peace treaty was signed granting the Ndyuka autonomy. From 1761 onwards, the Ndyuka gradually moved southwards in order to protected themselves from the colonists, and started to build villages on the Tapanahoni River dispelling the indigenous Tiriyó. Diitabiki is one of the villages. Slaves who had recently fled from Armina and Boven Commewijne were stationed near the confluence of the Tapanahoni and Lawa River to guard against attacks by the Aluku.

== Education ==
Since the 1960s, Diitabiki is home to the Granman Akontoe Velantie primary school, which as of 2015 has 333 pupils. In 2015, volunteers from Diitabiki and its surroundings extended the school with an extra classroom.

== Healthcare ==
Diitabiki is home to a Medische Zending healthcare centre.

== Energy ==
Between 1985 and 1987, electricity was provided by an overhead power line connected to the Puketi hydroelectric power plant. After this power plant stopped working during the Surinamese Interior War there have been attempts to rehabilitate the facility, but after a university delegation in 2003 and 2004 investigated the possibilities for hydroelectric power in the region, the Ministry for Regional Development decided to instead fund the construction of a larger hydroelectric power plant at the Gran Olo rapids nearby. Although it will initially only power Puketi and Futupasi, the plan is to eventually connect Diitabiki to the grid as well. As of 2016, the Gran Olo power plant is still under construction.

== Transportation ==
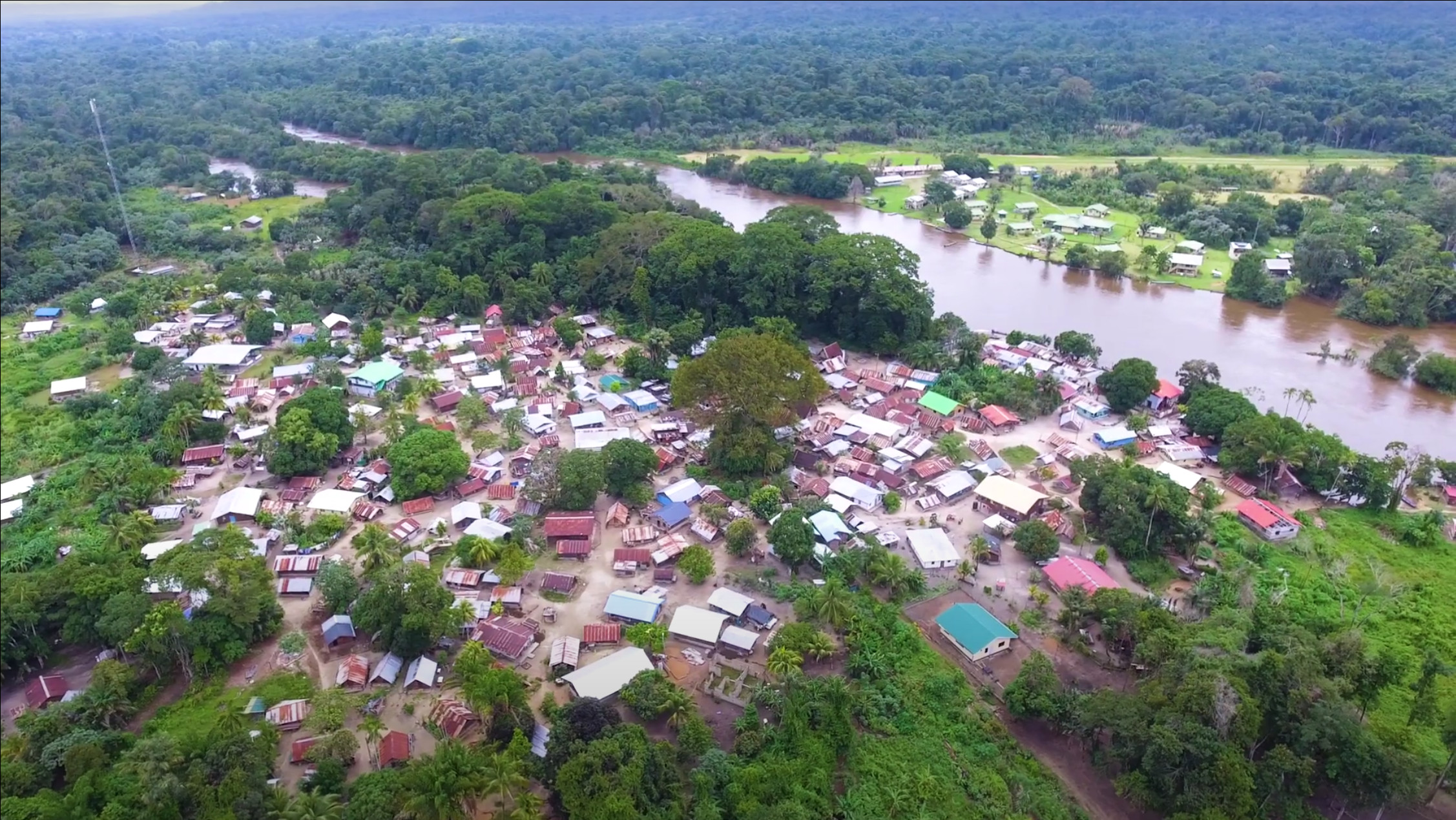
Diitabiki with Drietabbetje Airstrip in the background.

=== By air ===
Diitabiki is served by Drietabbetje Airstrip, offering Blue Wings and Gum Air scheduled services from Paramaribo.

=== By boat and rail ===
Diitabaki is close to the villages of Mainsi, and Moitaki. The Granholo waterfalls cannot be crossed by boat. A railway line has been built at Futupasi to cross the waterfalls, and since February 2008, a ferry service has been opened to Puketi and Godo Holo.

== Tourism ==
Several holiday resorts have opened in or near Diitabiki, and ecotourism is actively being promoted. The village is promoting itself as a tourist destination, and tour operators are offering tours to Diitabiki, and the surrounding nature.
