= List of power stations in Suriname =

This article lists all power stations in Suriname.

== Hydroelectric ==
Hydroelectric station	River	Type	Reservoir	Capacity	Year completed
Afobaka	Suriname River	Reservoir	Brokopondo Reservoir	189 MW	1964
Puketi hydroelectric power plant	Tapanahony River	run-of-the-river		50 kW	1981
Gran Olo hydroelectric power plant	Tapanahony River	run-of-the-river		300 kW	(2016)

== Thermal ==
Thermal power station	Community	Coordinates	Fuel type	Capacity	Year completed	Owner
EBS Saramaccastraat	Paramaribo		Diesel fuel	135 MW (72 MW + 63 MW)	63 MW extension completed in 2013	EBS
Staatsolie			Heavy fuel oil	28 MW		Staatsolie
Paranam			Fuel oil	47 MW	1963 and 1965	Paranam

== See also ==
- List of largest power stations in the world
- List of power stations in South America
