= Tapanahony =

Coordinates: 3°20′27″N 55°07′44″W

Tapanahoni Tapamawoni (Eastern Maroon Creole)
- Resort
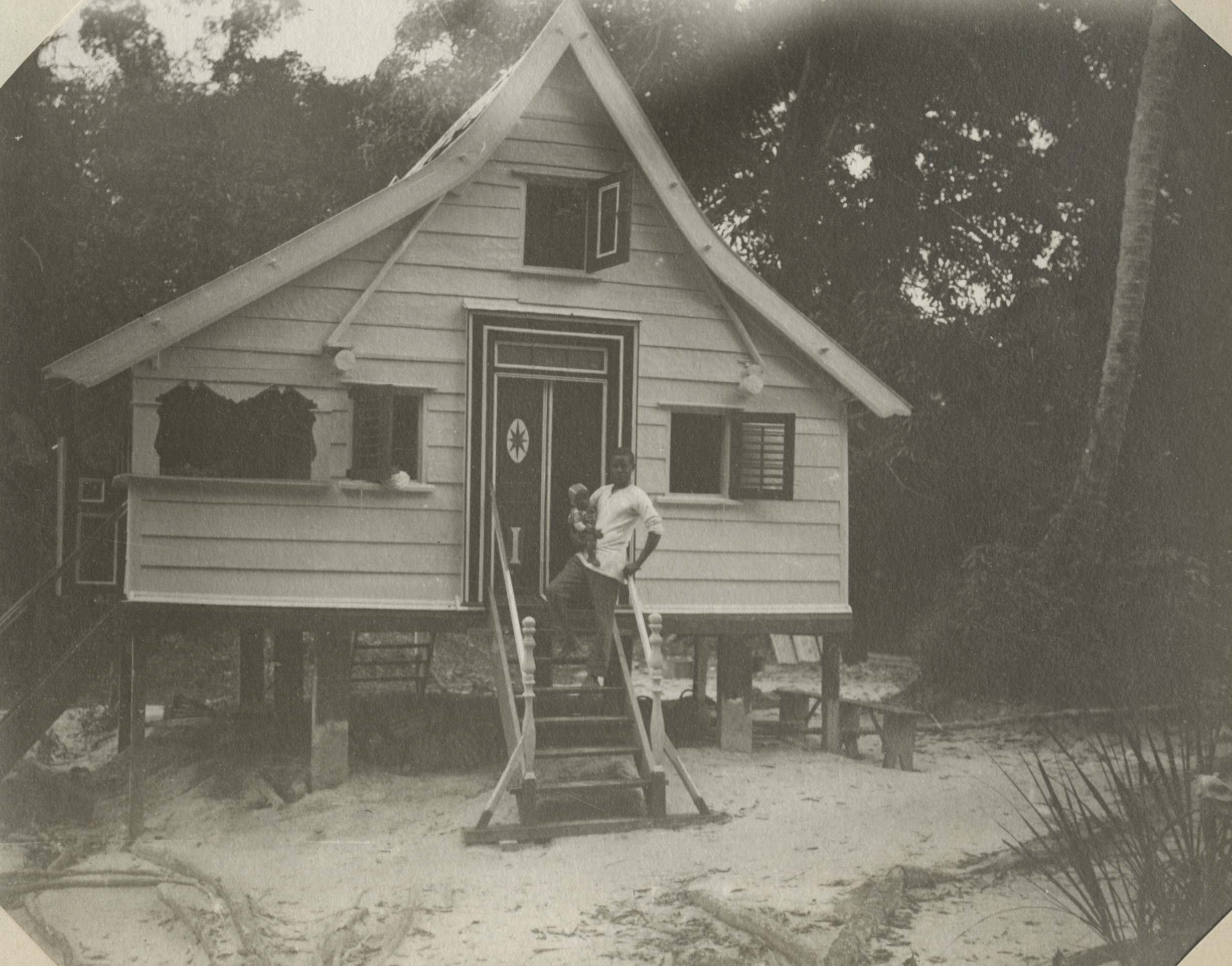
- Diitabiki (1907)

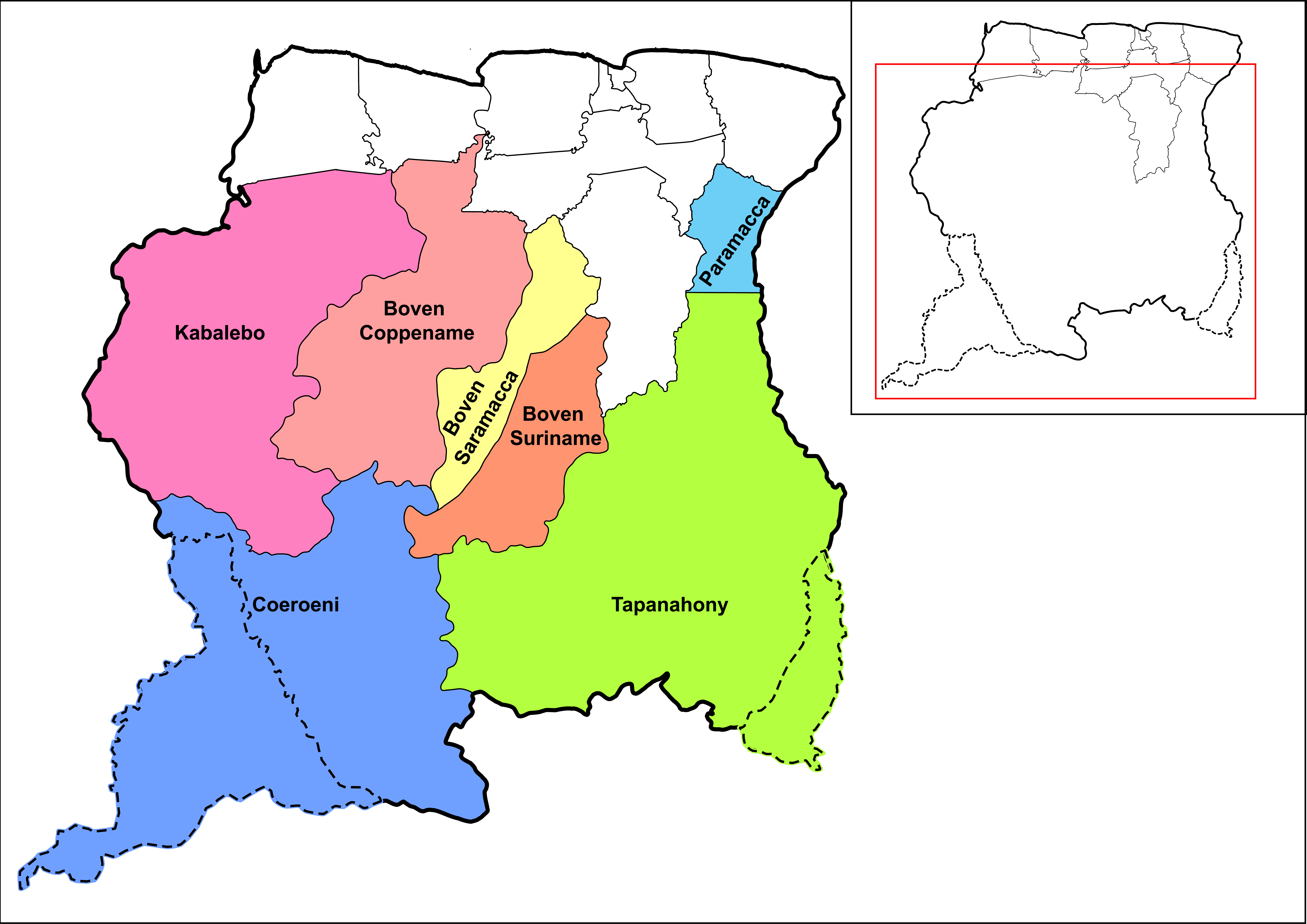
- Map showing the resorts of Sipaliwini District. Tapanahony
- Country: Suriname
- District: Sipaliwini District

Area
  - Total: 38,965 km^{2} (15,044 sq mi)

Population (2012)
  - Total: 13,808
  - Density: 0.35437/km^{2} (0.91781/sq mi)
- Time zone: UTC-3 (AST)

Tapanahoni (Eastern Maroon Creole: Tapamawoni or Tapanawoni), is a resort in Suriname, located in the Sipaliwini District. Its population at the 2012 census was 13,808. Tapanahoni is a part of Sipaliwini which has no capital, but is directly governed from Paramaribo. Tapanahony is an enormous resort which encompasses a quarter of the country of Suriname. The most important town is Diitabiki (old name: Drietabbetje) which is the residence of the granman of the Ndyuka people since 1950, and the location of the oracle.

The disputed area of south-east Suriname between the Malani (the eastern tributary river) and the Litani rivers belongs to the Tapanahoni resort.

== History ==
The Ndyuka people are of African descent, and were shipped as slaves to Suriname in the 17-18th century to work on Dutch-owned colonial plantations. The escaped slaves moved into the rainforest, and banded together. There were frequent clashes between the colonists and the Ndyuka, however in 1760, a peace treaty was signed granting the Ndyuka autonomy. From 1761, the Ndyuka gradually moved southwards in order to protect themselves from the colonists, and started to build camps on the Tapanahoni River dispelling the indigenous Tiriyó. Slaves who had recently fled from Armina (Note: Post Armina was a guard post on the Marowijne River.) and Boven Commewijne were stationed at Poeloegoedoe near the confluence of the Tapanahoni and Lawa River to guard against attacks by the Aluku. In December 1791, Philip Stoelman founded a military outpost on Stoelmanseiland, thus establishing a militarised border between the Ndyuka held territory and the Colony of Suriname. In 1857, the granman of the Ndyuka was given a yearly allowance of ƒ1,000 (2018: €10,233) by the Government of Suriname.

The area was an unknown area for the white settlers, and was not explored until the beginning of the 20th century. Still the explorers first had to request an audience with the granman. Gerard Versteeg, leader of a 1904 expedition, expressed his frustration in his diary about having to wait four days before being granted permission to continue his journey.

In 1983, the Sipaliwini District was created. On 11 September 2019, a new resort was created out of Tapanahony, and is called Pamacca. The Pamacca resort is the northern part of Tapanahony, and mainly inhabited by the Paramaccan people.

== Villages ==
The resort of Tapanahony consists of about 49 Ndyuka villages and 14 indigenous villages.

Name	Tribe	Clinic	School	Church
Akani Pata	Wayana	no	no	no
Aloepi 2	Tiriyó	?	?	?
Antonio do Brinco	not applicable	no	no	yes
Apetina	Wayana	yes	yes	no
Benzdorp	Ndyuka	no	no	no
Cottica	Aluku	yes	yes	no
Diitabiki	Ndyuka	yes	yes	Moravian
Godo Holo	Ndyuka	via Diitabiki	yes	two
Kawemhakan	Wayana	yes	no	no
Kumakahpan	Wayana	no	no	no
Lensidede	Wayana	no	no	no
Manlobi	Ndyuka	no	yes	yes
Moitaki	Ndyuka	no	yes	no
Paloemeu	Wayana	yes	no	yes
Pelelu Tepu	Tiriyó	yes	yes	yes
Poeketi	Ndyuka	no	no	no
Poeloegoedoe	Ndyuka	no	no	no
Tutu Kampu	Wayana	no	no	no

Source: Planning Office Suriname - Districts 2009-2013 - Table 3.1
