= Roseveltpiek =

Mountain in Suriname

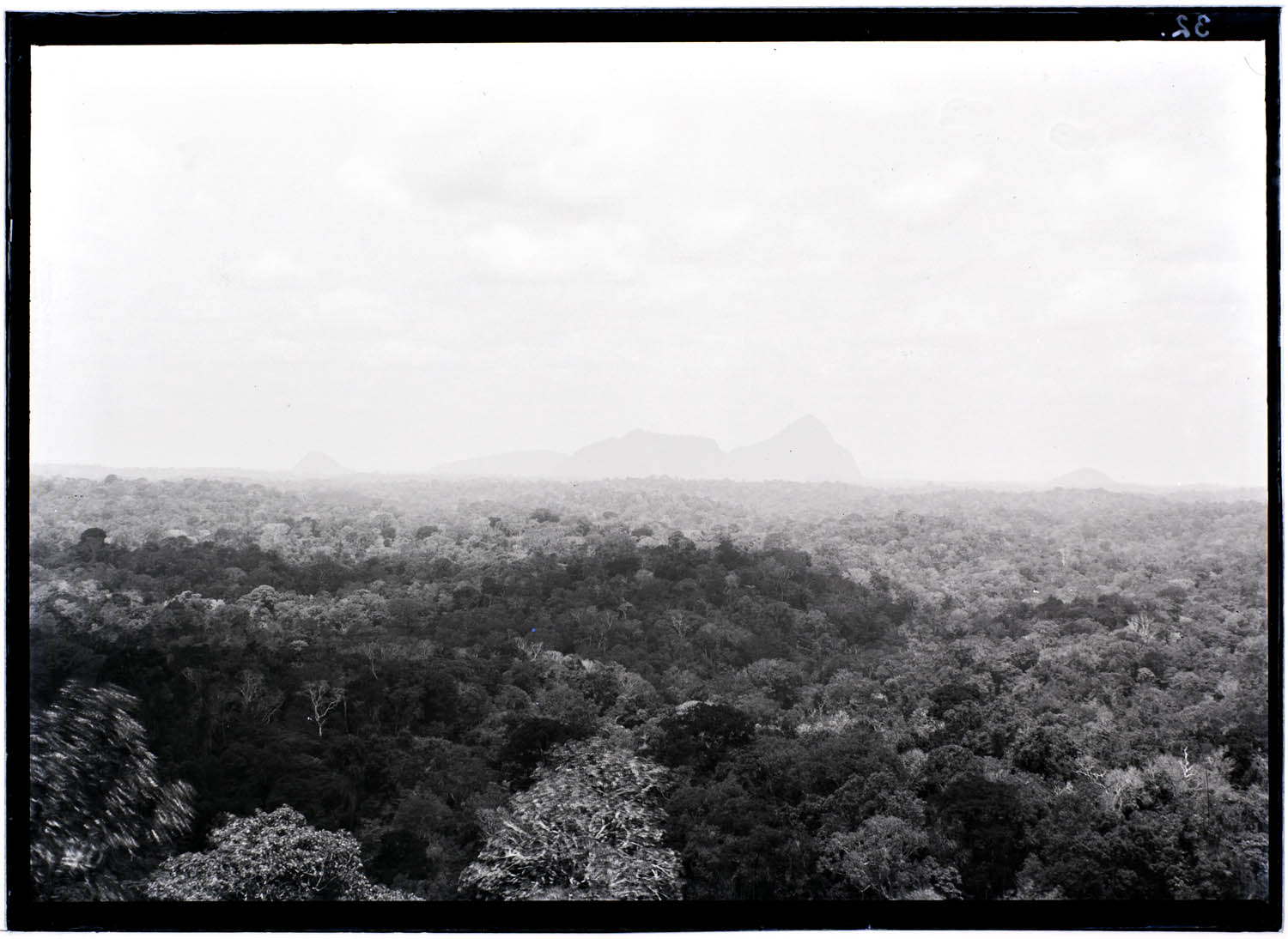
- Roseveltpiek as seen from Magneetrots

Highest point
- Elevation: 644 m (2,113 ft)
- Coordinates: 3°21′12″N 55°11′8″W

Geography
- Location within Suriname
- Location: Sipaliwini District, Suriname
- Parent range: Oranje Mountains

Roseveltpiek is a mountain in Suriname at 644 metres (2,113 ft). It is located in the Sipaliwini District. The mountain is named after Johan Cateau van Rosevelt. The Rosevelpiek as well as the Tebutop, the Magneetrots, and the Kasikasima were first mapped in 1904 during the Tapanahony expedition.
