= Apetina =

Apetina Pïlëuwimë
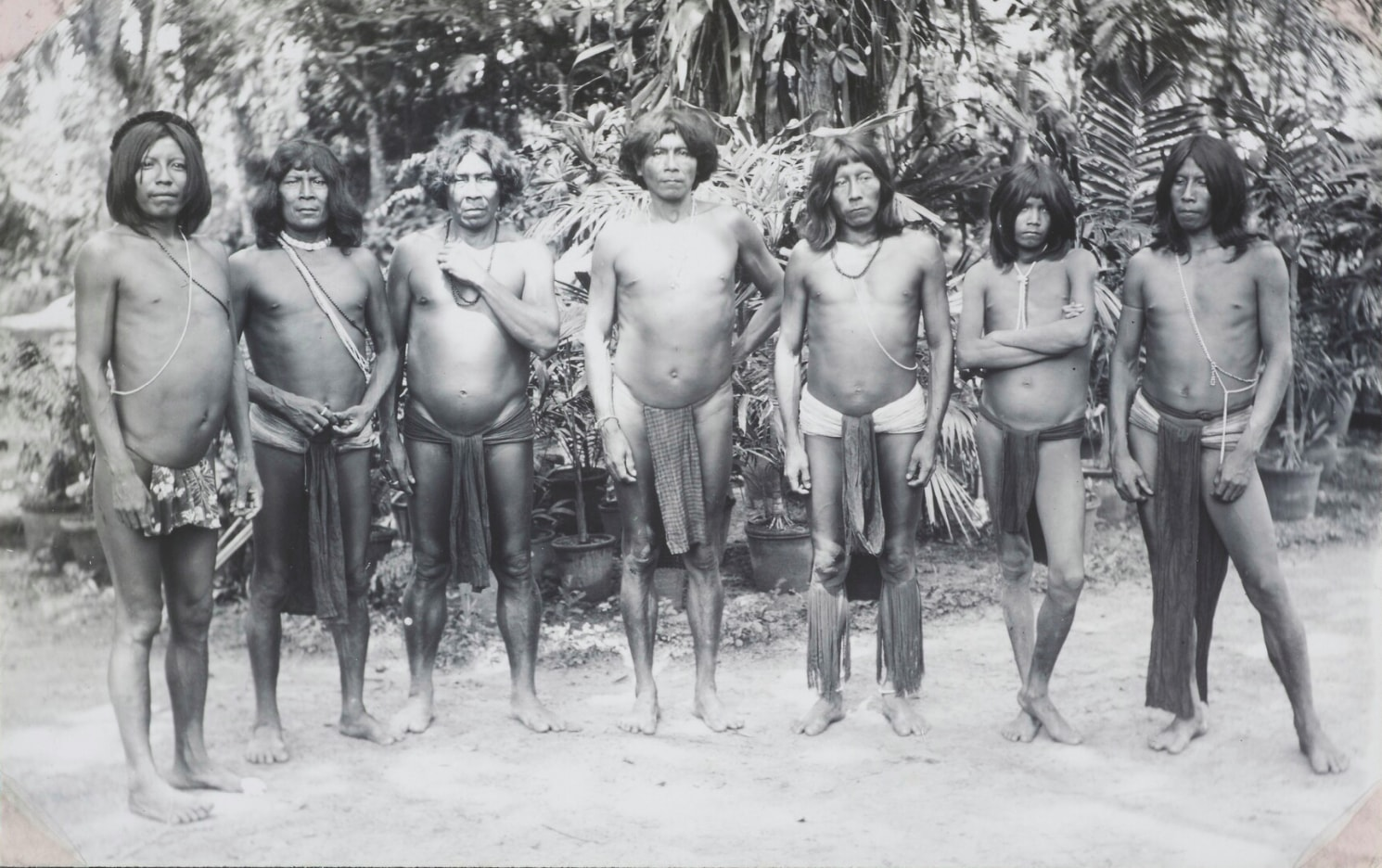
- Captain Apetina Curiel with company (1937)

- Location in Suriname
- Coordinates: 3°30′37″N 55°3′7″W
- Country: Suriname
- District: Sipaliwini District
- Resort (municipality): Tapanahony

Government
  - Granman: Aptuk Noahe
  - Captain: Aines Japanale
  - Captain: Pantakoe Ajamaka

Population (2020)
  - Total: 324

Apetina, also known as Pïlëuwimë or Puleowime, is a village in the South Eastern jungle area of Suriname within the Tapanahony resort in the Sipaliwini District. It is located at 3°30′N 55°04′W in the jungle on the small hills along the river Tapanahoni. Nearby points include Tebu Mountain, at around 347 m (1,138 ft) in height, and the Man Gandafutu waterfall. The majority of Apetina's population is the Wayana people. These Indians mostly originate from Brazil and once have fled because of tribal warfare. There also is primary school and an airstrip located near the Indian village of Apetina.

== Geography ==
Historical population
Year	Pop.	±% p.a.
1965	106	—
1969	117	+2.50%
1970	122	+4.27%
2006	262	+2.15%
2020	324	+1.53%
Source: Boven 2006, pp. 103, 106 (1965–1970); Heemskerk et al. 2007, p. 21 (2006)

Apetina lies about 13.5 kilometres (8.4 mi) upstream the Tapanahony river from the village of Tutu Kampu and about 2 kilometres (1.2 mi) downstream the river from the village of Akani Pata. The Apetina Airstrip lies in between the villages of Apetina and Akani Pata.
