= Kasikasima =

Mountain in Suriname

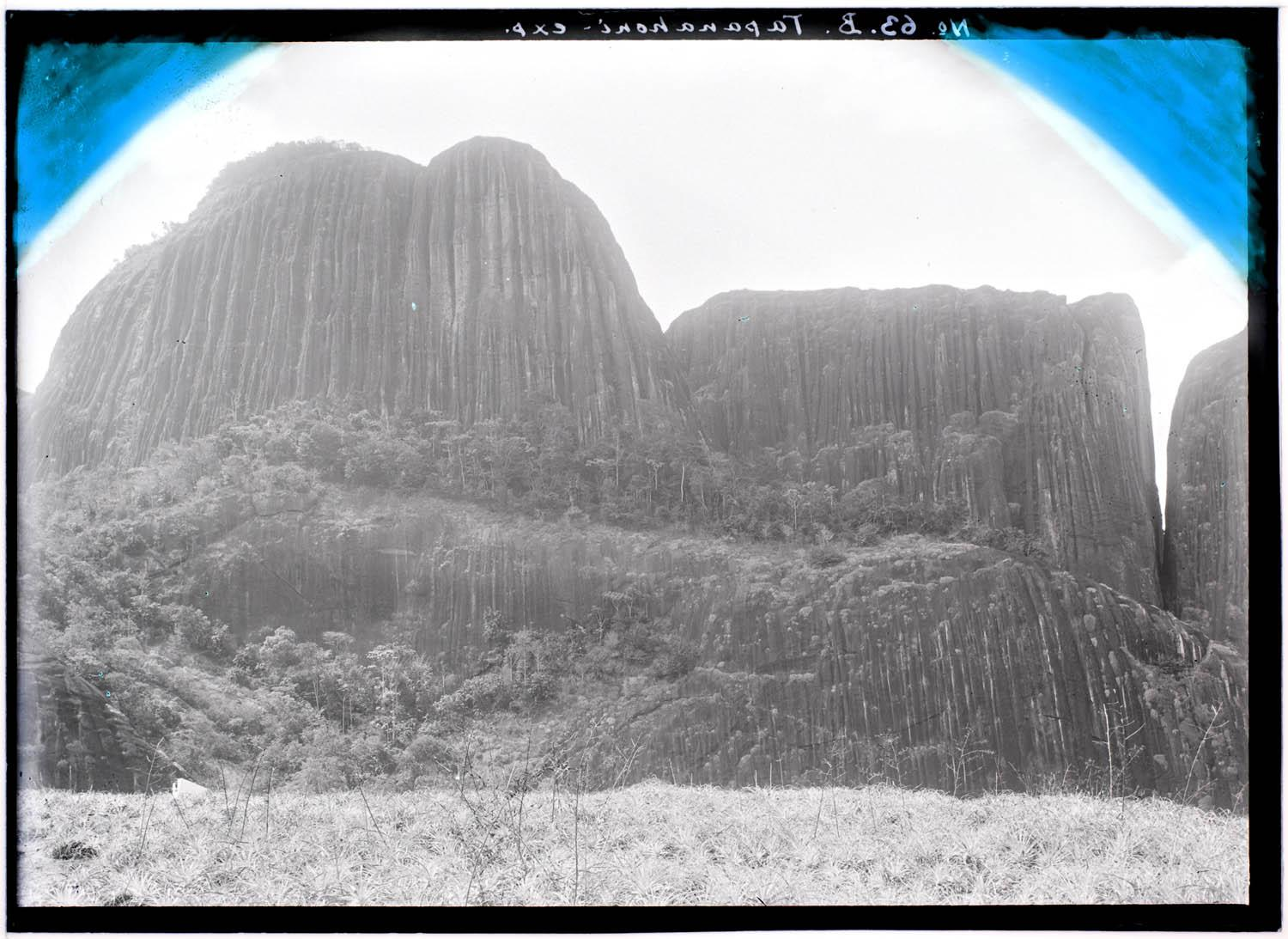
- Kasikasima in 1904

Highest point
- Elevation: 718 m (2,356 ft)
- Coordinates: 2°58′47″N 55°24′39″W

Geography
- Location within Suriname
- Location: Sipaliwini District, Suriname
- Parent range: Tumuk Humak Mountains

Kasikasima, also spelt Kassikassima, is a mountain in the Sipaliwini District of Suriname. It is 718 metres (2,356 ft) high.

The village of Paloemeu and its Vincent Fayks Airport are 40 kilometres (25 mi) north, and are the entry point for canoe ride tours to the mountain provided by several tour companies.

Kasikasima as well as the Tebutop, the Magneetrots, and the Roseveltpiek were first mapped in 1904 during the Tapanahony expedition.

== Kampu ==
In the 1990s, a village called Kampu was set up near Mount Kasikasima at the instigation of an evangelist, who had the intention of making the place a bible camp and meeting point of the Tiriyó of Suriname and Brazil. The population as of 2013 is 10 to 20 people. 2°58′47″N 55°24′39″W
