= Magneetrots =

Mountain in Suriname

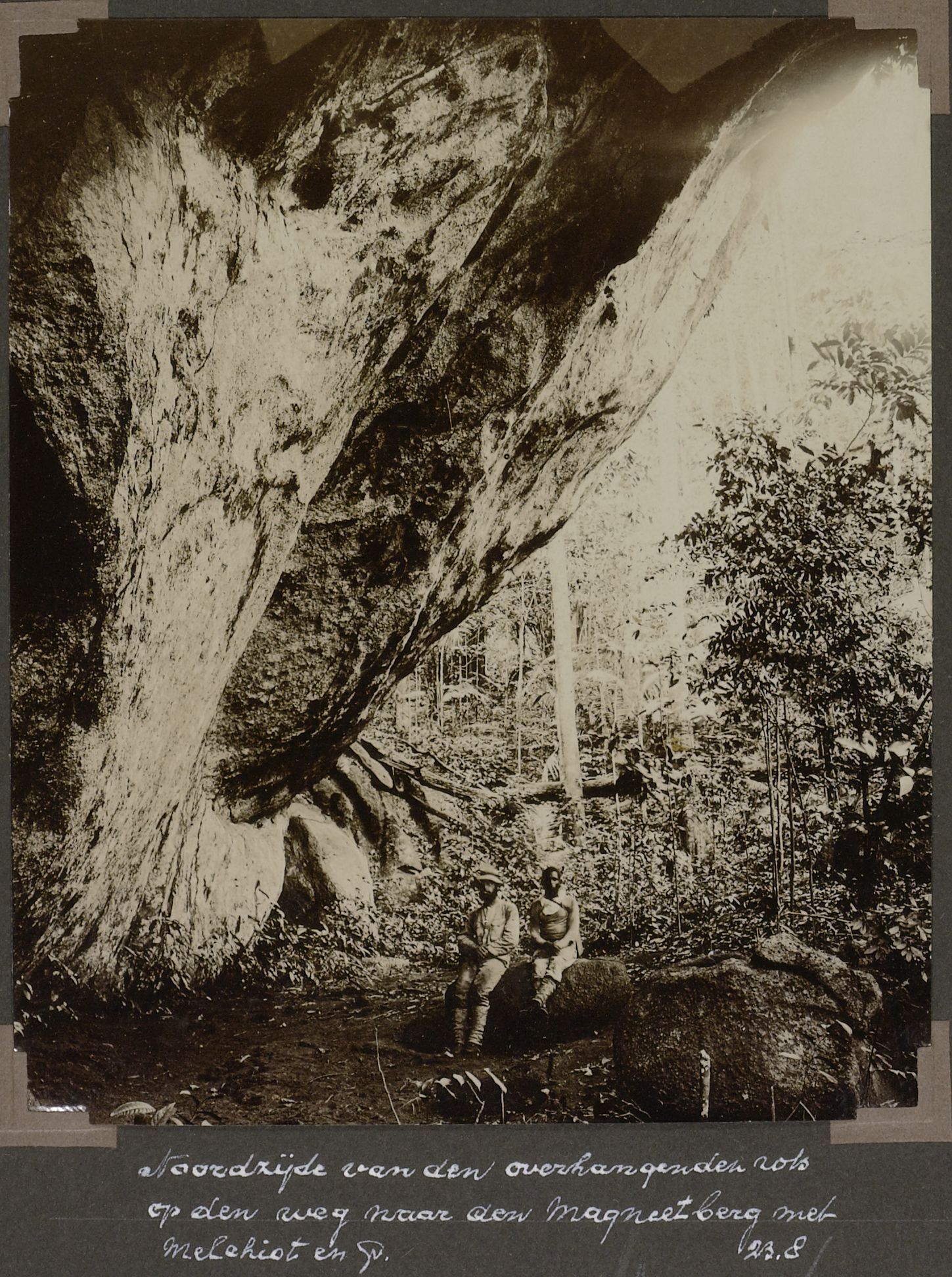
- Overhanging rock on the way to the top

Highest point
- Elevation: 310 m (1,020 ft)
- Prominence: 130 m (430 ft)
- Coordinates: 3.4625°N 55.274444°W

Geography
- Location within Suriname
- Location: Sipaliwini District, Suriname

Climbing
- First ascent: 1904

Magneetrots is a mountain in the Sipaliwini District of Suriname. It measures 310 metres.

== History ==
The Magneetrots as well as the Tebutop, the Roseveltpiek, and the Kasikasima were first explored in 1904 during the Tapanahony expedition.

On 16 August 1904, the expedition led by Alphons Franssen Herderschee, made a first unsuccessful attempt at climbing the mountain. On 19 August, they tried again. Magnetic disturbances were observed by several expedition members, and therefore the mountain was named Magneetrots (English: magnet rock). The first part of the climb was a gentle slope upwards with many overhanging rocks, however near the top, there was a steep wall.

== Bibliography ==
- Herderschee, A. Franssen (1905). Verslag der Tapanahoni-expeditie (in Dutch). Brill Publishers.
- Bruijning, Conrad Friederich Albert; Voorhoeve, Jan; Gordijn, W. (1977). Encyclopedie van Suriname (in Dutch). Amsterdam: Elsevier. p. 395. ISBN 9010018423.
