= Akani Pata =

Akani Pata Akani Kampu
- Location in Suriname
- Coordinates: 3°29′50″N 55°3′53″W
- Country: Suriname
- District: Sipaliwini District
- Resort: Tapanahony

Population (2006)
  - Total: 20

Akani Pata, also known as Akani Kampu, is a Wayana village on the Tapanahony River in Suriname. The village consists of about three households and lies about 2 kilometres (1.2 mi) upstream the Tapanahony River from the village of Apetina. The Apetina Airstrip lies in between Akani Pata and Apetina.
