= Langatabiki =

Village and island in the Pamacca Resort of Suriname

Langatabbetje Langatabiki
- Village
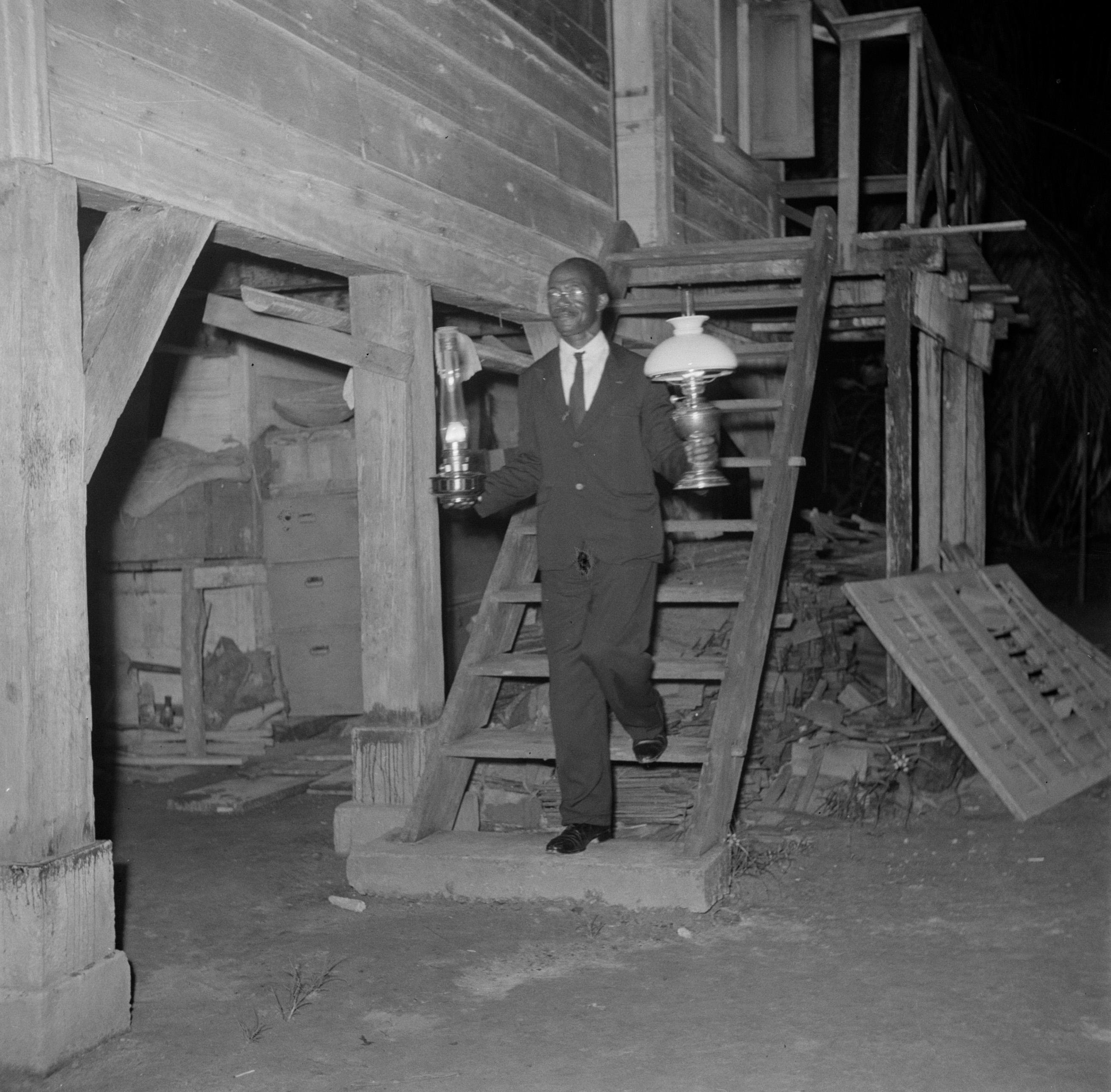
- Langatabiki (1947)

- Location within Suriname
- Coordinates: 4°59′30″N 54°26′30″W
- Country: Suriname
- District: Sipaliwini District
- Resort: Pamacca

Population (2010)
  - Total: 262
- Time zone: UTC-3 (AST)

Langatabiki (Dutch: Langatabbetje) is a Paramacca village in the Sipaliwini District of Suriname. Langatabiki is the residence of the granman of the Paramaccan people. Langatabiki is located in the Pamacca resort which was created on 11 September 2019 out of Tapanahony.

Since 1879, a group of about 90 Maroon created a settlement on an island in the Marowijne River near the mouth of the Paramacca Creek. The town was named Langatabiki (Long Island). The granman at the time of the founding was called Apensa.

== Education ==
Langatabiki is home to the granman Cornelis Forster primary school.

== Energy ==
Like most Maroon villages in the interior, Langatabiki relied on diesel generators for electricity until 2016. Although the fuel for the generators is provided free of charge by the Surinamese government, there was only enough available to provide electricity for a few hours per day, usually from 6 p.m. until midnight. In March 2016, the first phase of a solar power network opened in Langatabiki, aiming to provide electricity to the village for 24 hours per day.

== Healthcare ==
Langatabiki is home to a Medische Zending healthcare centre.

== Transportation ==
=== By road ===
Langatabiki is linked by road to Moengo, from where there is access to the East-West Link. Plans have been developed to pave the road to Moengo, and built one road from Langatabiki via Stoelmanseiland to Benzdorp, and another from Langatabiki to Brokopondo.

=== By air ===
Langatabiki is served by Langatabbetje Airstrip, offering Blue Wing scheduled services from Paramaribo.

=== By water ===
Villages on the Marowijne, Tapanahony and Lawa rivers are reachable by dugout canoe taxis, which regularly travel the rivers. The village of Apatou in French Guiana lies about 20 kilometres (12 mi) downstream the Marowijne River.
