= Manlobi Mountains =

Mountain range in Suriname

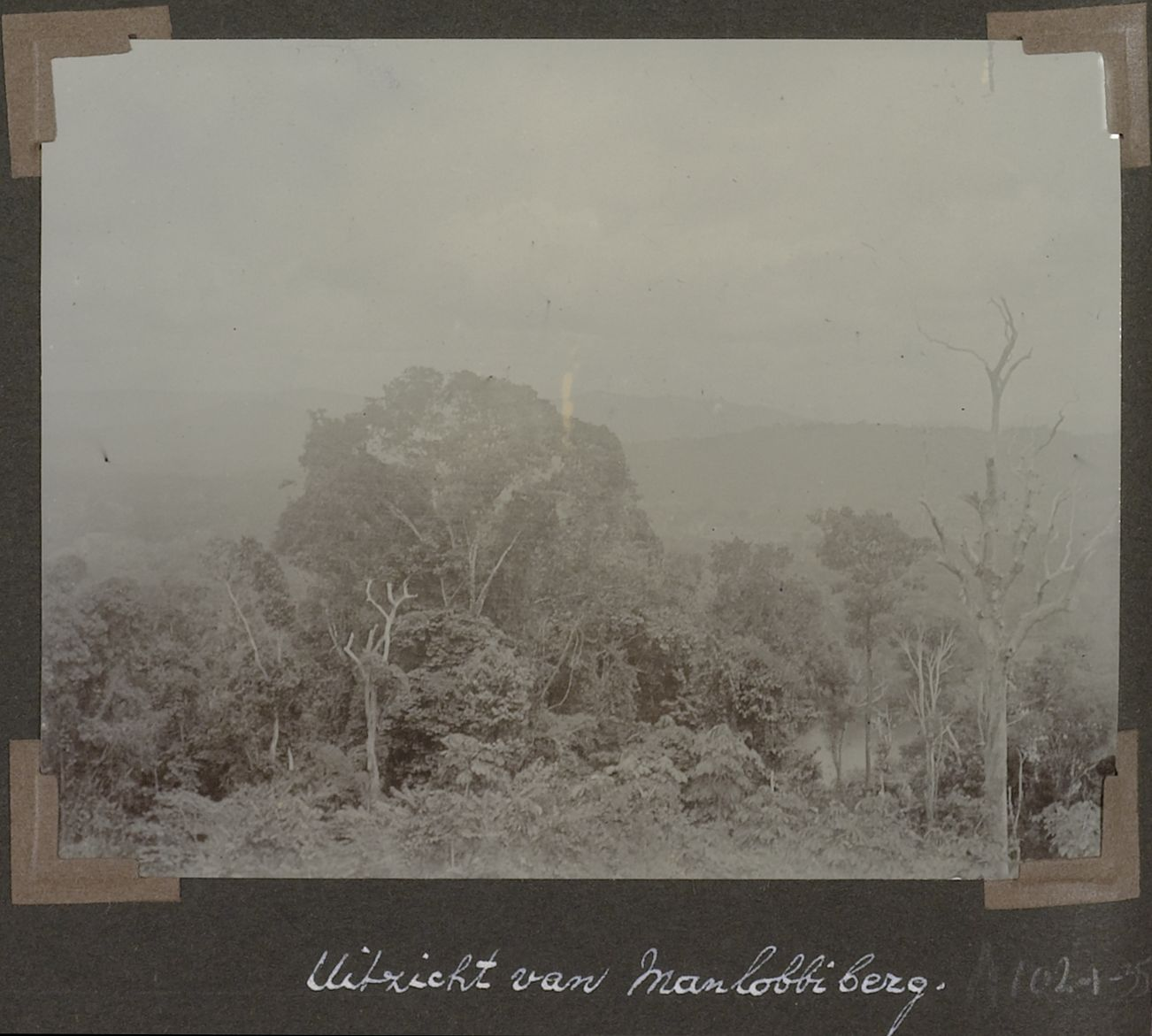
- Overview of the Manlobi Mountains

Highest point
- Elevation: 320 m (1,050 ft)
- Coordinates: 4°14′N 54°29′W

Geography
- Location within Suriname
- Country: Suriname

The Manlobi Mountains (Dutch: Manlobigebergte) is a mountain range in the Sipaliwini District of Suriname. It is named after the Ndyuka village of Manlobi.
