= Poeloegoedoe =

Village in the Tapanahony Resort of Suriname

Poeloegoedoe Pulugudu
- Village
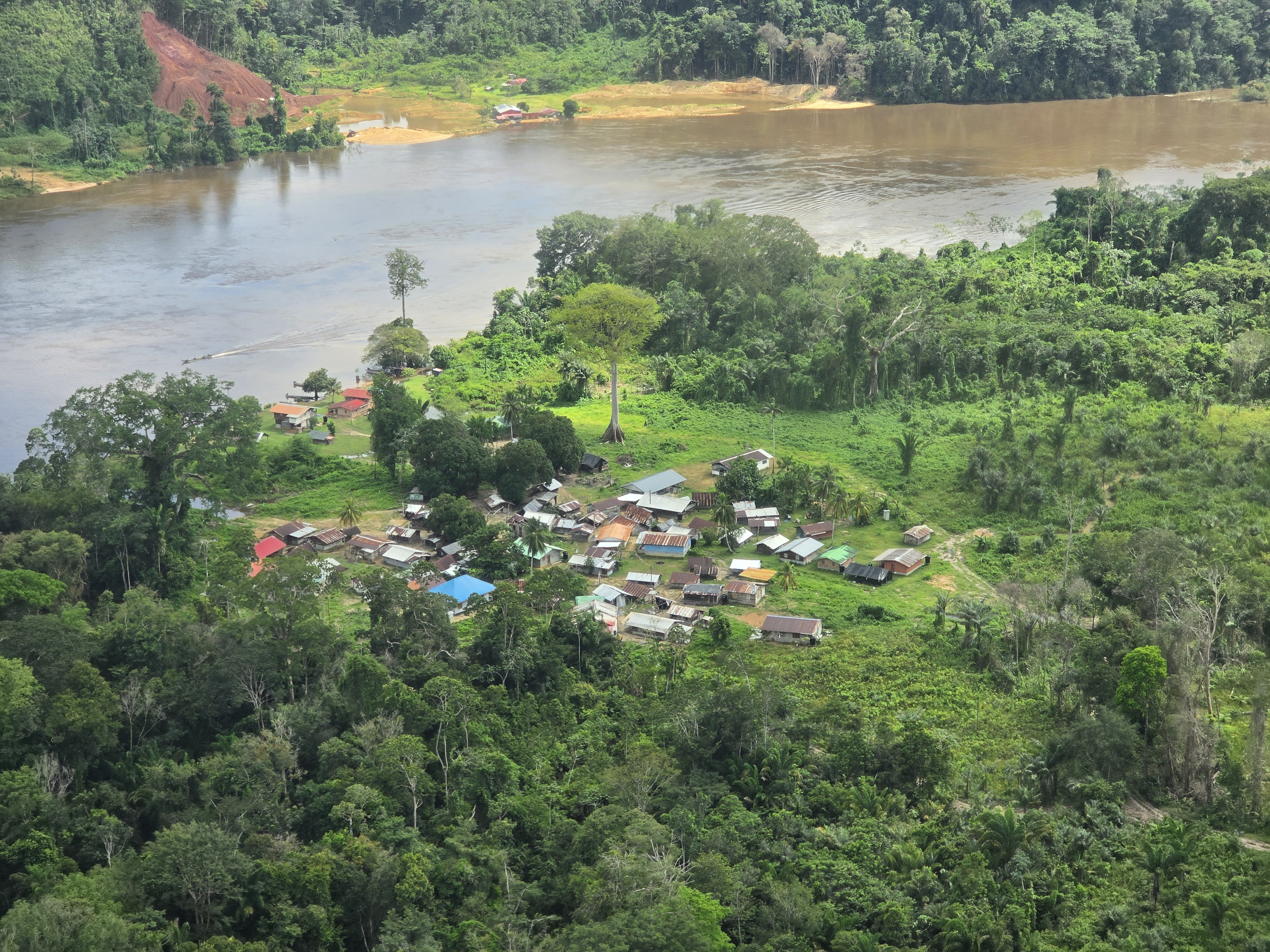
- Pulugudu in 2025

- Location within Suriname
- Coordinates: 4°21′12″N 54°26′31″W
- Country: Suriname
- District: Sipaliwini District
- Resort: Tapanahony
- Time zone: UTC-3 (AST)

Poeloegoedoe (also: Pulugudu and Pori Gudu) is a village in the Tapanahony River at the confluence with the Lawa River. It is named after the Poeloegoedoe Falls and is inhabited by maroons of the Ndyuka people. The village is located in the Tapanahony resort of Sipaliwini District, Suriname.

== History ==
The Poeloegoedoe Falls are located at the confluence of the Tapanahony River with the Lawa River after which both rivers continue as the Marowijne River. The hills on the Surinamese and French side constitute a large wall, and the river is squeezed through a 20-metre opening. The word Poeloegoedoe means "takes your possessions" (compare: pull goods).

In 1805, there was a mutiny of the Corps of Black Hunters (Redi Musu) which had been established to protect the colony of Suriname against attacks by maroons. The soldiers moved into the tribal area of the Ndyuka people and reached an agreement. On 3 June 1806, the postholder Kelderman reported that they had settled in Poeloegoedoe and had created gardens for subsistence farming. The location was a strategic choice of the Ndyuka to protect the Tapanahony River against attacks by the Aluku, an enemy maroon people. The soldiers were later integrated into the tribe as one of the los (matrilinear kinship groups).

== Overview ==
Poeloegoedoe is a small village, and does not have a school or clinic. There is a gold concession near the village.

== Bibliography ==
- Groot, Silvia de (1989). "Het Korps Zwarte Jagers in Suriname collaboratie en opstand II". OSO. Tijdschrift voor Surinaamse Taalkunde, Letterkunde en Geschiedenis (in Dutch). Vol. 8.
