= Providence, French Guiana =

Providence
- Village
- Location in French Guiana
- Coordinates: 4.6186°N 54.4139°W
- Country: France
- Overseas region: French Guiana
- Arrondissement: Saint-Laurent-du-Maroni
- Commune: Apatou

Providence is a village of Paramacca Maroons in the commune of Apatou at the confluence of the Maroni River and the Beïman Creek in French Guiana.

The village can only be accessed by boat via the Maroni River, and is located about three hours south of Apatou. The children in Providence and the nearby islands used to go to school in Stoelmanseiland, however the Surinamese Interior War (1986-1992) caused the closure of the school, leaving about 300 children in the region without access to education. In 2012, a school was constructed in the village.

In 1991, gold was discovered in the Beïman Creek near the village. The main concession is the Esperance Gold Mine which is being exploited by Newmont, however the discovery has attracted garimpeiros (illegal gold miners) to the region. In 2017, the French Development Agency started a project to provide the village with clean drinking water.
