= Afaka syllabary =

Script for the Ndyuka creole of Suriname

Afaka
- Script type: Syllabary
- Creator: Afáka Atumisi
- Period: Invented 1910
- Direction: Varies
- Languages: Ndyuka

ISO 15924
- ISO 15924: Afak (439), Afaka

The Afaka script ( afaka sikifi) is a syllabary of 56 letters devised in 1910 for the Ndyuka language, an English-based creole of Suriname. The script is named after its inventor, Afáka Atumisi. It continues to be used to write Ndyuka in the 21st century, but the literacy rate in the language for all scripts is under 10%.

Afaka is the only script in use that was designed specifically for a creole.

== Typology ==
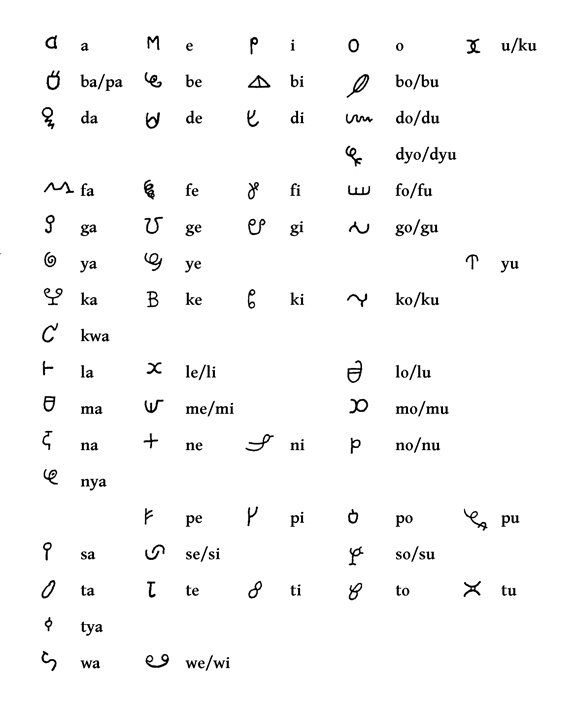
The syllabary as recorded by Gonggrijp in 1968. All letters may include a final nasal (a for an, ba for ban, etc.), and the rows for b, d, dy, and g may also stand for mb, nd, ndy, and ng. The y row is placed between g and k because it was originally transcribed with Dutch j. The dot inside the loop of nya may be an error due to confusion with similarly shaped be.

Afaka is a defective script. Tone is phonemic but not written. Final consonants (the nasal [n]) are not written, but long vowels are, by adding a vowel letter. Prenasalized stops and voiced stops are written with the same letters, and syllables with the vowels [u] and [o] are seldom distinguished: The syllables [o]/[u], [po]/[pu], and [to]/[tu] have separate letters, but syllables starting with the consonants [b, d, dy, f, g, l, m, n, s, y] do not. Thus the Afaka rendition of Ndyuka could also be read as Dyoka. In four cases syllables with [e] and [i] are not distinguished (after the consonants [l, m, s, w]); a single letter is used for both [ba] and [pa], and another for both [u] and [ku]. Several consonants have only one glyph assigned to them. These are [ty], which only has a glyph for [tya]; [kw] (also [kp]), which only has [kwa ~ kpa]; [ny], which only has [nya] (though older records report that letter pulled double duty for [nyu]); and [dy], which only has [dyu/dyo]. There are no glyphs assigned specifically to the consonant [gw] ~ [gb]. The result of these conflations is that the only syllables for which there is no ambiguity (except for tone) are those beginning with the consonant [t].

There is a single punctuation mark, the pipe or |, which corresponds to a comma or a period. Afaka initially used spaces between words, but not all writers have continued to do so.

== Etymology ==
The origins of many of the letters are obscure, though several appear to be acrophonic rebuses, with many of these being symbols from Africa. Examples of rebuses include a curl with a dot in it representing a baby in the belly (in Ndyuka, a abi beli, lit. "she has belly", means "she's pregnant"), which stands for [be]; two hands outstretched to give (Ndyuka gi) stand for [gi]; iconic symbols for come (Ndyuka kon) and go to represent [ko] or [kon] and [go]; two linked circles for we stand for [wi], while [yu] is an inversion of [mi], corresponding to the pronouns you and me; letters like Roman numerals two and four are [tu] and [fo]. (which would be like writing "2 4get" for 'to forget' in English.) [ka] and [pi] are said to represent feces (Ndyuka kaka) and urine (pisi). A "+" sign stands for [ne] or [nen], from the word name (Ndyuka nen), derived from the practice of signing one's name with an X. The odd conflation of [u] and [ku] is due to the letter being a pair of hooks, which is uku in Ndyuka. The only letters which appear to correspond to the Latin alphabet are the vowels a, o, and maybe e, though o is justified as the shape of the mouth when pronouncing it.

== Variants and syllabic order ==
Texts in Afaka's own hand show significant variation in the letters. A good number are rotated a quarter turn, and sometimes inverted as well; these are be, di, dyo, fi, ga, ge, ye, ni, nya, pu, se, so, te, and tu, while lo, ba/pa, and wa may be in mirror-image and sa, to may be simply inverted. Others have curved vs angular variants: do, fa, ge, go, ko, and kwa. In yet others, the variants appear to reflect differences in stroke order.

The traditional mnemonic order (alphabetic order) may partially reflect the origins of some of the signs. For example, tu and fo ("two" and "four", respectively), yu and mi ("you" and "me"), and ko and go ("come" and "go") are placed near each other. Other syllables are placed near each other to spell out words: futu ("foot"), odi ("hello"), and ati ("heart"), or even phrases: a moke un taki ("it gives us speech"), masa gado te baka ben ye ("Lord God, that the white/black(?) man heard").

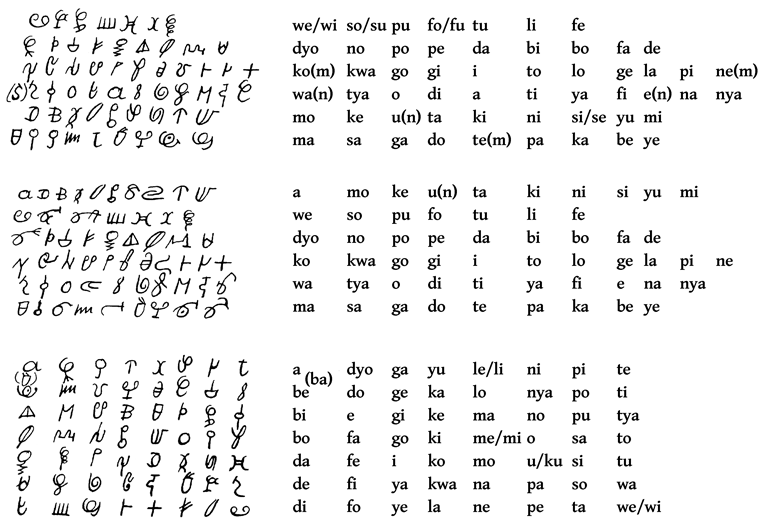
Three orders of the Afaka syllabary as recorded in the Patili Molosi Buku, c. 1917. The traditional order is at top. Letters which retain a final nasal may reflect their origin, such as ne(m) from "name" and ko(m) from "come". The mid order differs in moving row 5 and the syllable a to the beginning. Most significant allographs can be seen in comparing these two syllabaries, with some letters rotated and others more angular in the mid syllabary. The bottom order is arranged top-to-bottom according to the Dutch alphabetic order, reflecting the Dutch spellings j and oe for modern Ndyuka y and u, respectively.

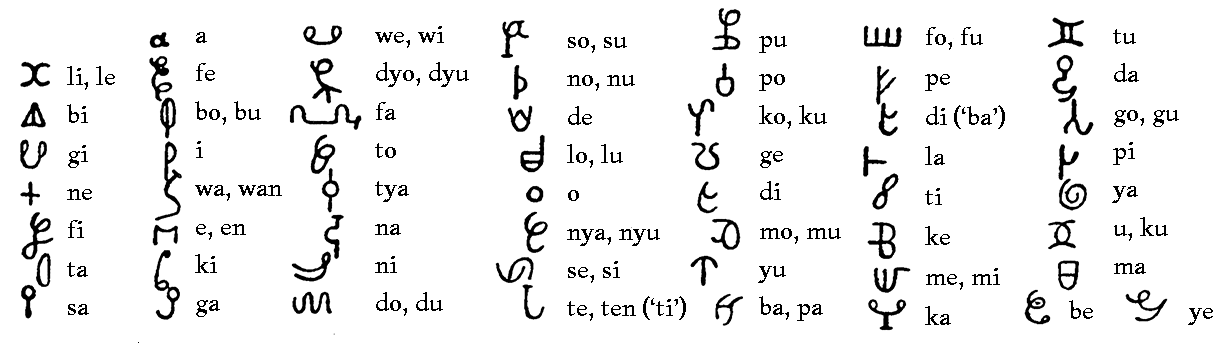
The syllabary as recorded in 1920. The order is the original except that a comes first. There are three errors: kwa is missing; te(n) in column 4 was written ti(ng), though ti appears again in column 6; and di in column 6 was transcribed ba, though it duplicates di in column 5. (Ba/pa in column 5 had only been transcribed as pa. It should also be closed at the bottom; perhaps this is an inking error.) Also, accounts from the second half of the 20th century no longer give nyu as an alternate reading of nya.

== Computer encoding ==
The Afaka script has been proposed for inclusion in the Unicode Standard. The codepoints U+16C80 through U+16CCF have been tentatively designated for the script.

== Sample text ==
This is apparently the first letter written by Afaka. It was copied into the Patili Molosi Buku c. 1917.

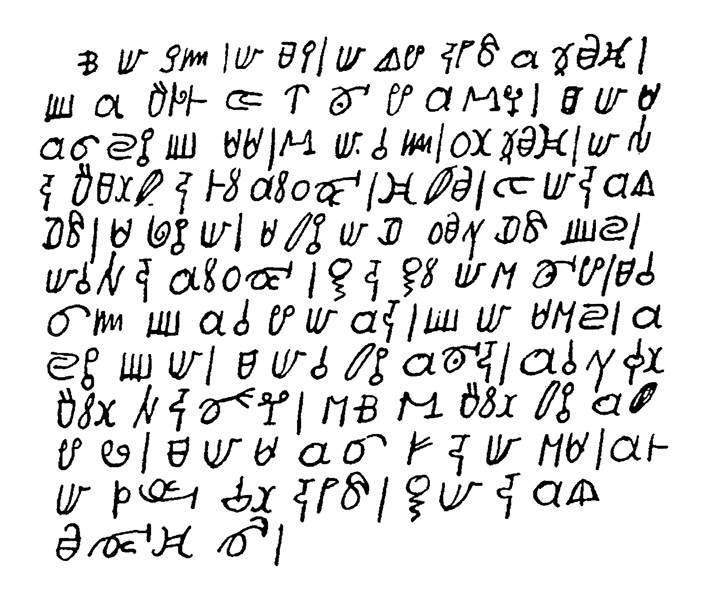

kee mi gadu. mi masaa. mi bigin na ini a wowtu [⟨ulotu⟩].

fu a pampila di yu be gi afaka. ma mi de
anga siki fu dede. fa mi sa du. oli wowtu. mi go
na pamalibo na lanti ati oso. tu boo [⟨bolo⟩]. di mi ná abi
moni. den yaki mi. den taki mi mu oloko moni fosi.
mi sa go na ati osu. da(n) na dati mi e begi. masaa
gadu fu a sa gi mi ana. fu mi deesi. a
siki fu mi. ma mi sa taki abena. a sa kon tyai [⟨tyali⟩]
paati [⟨patili⟩] go na ndyuka. e(n)ke fa paati taki a bun
gi wi. ma mi de anga pen na mi ede. ala
mi nosu poli na ini. da(n) mi ná abi
losutu ye.

Oh my God, my Lord, I start with the words on the paper that you've given Afaka. But I'm deathly ill. How can I say it? I went to Paramaribo, Lands Hospital, two times. Because I have no money, they chased me away. They say I must first earn money [before] I go to the Hospital. Therefore I pray to the Lord God that he will give me a hand with the medicine for my illness. But I will talk to Abena. He will bring this to the Priest of the Ndyuka. So as the Father says it is good for us. But I have pain in my head. All my nose is rotting from the inside. So I have no rest, I tell you.
