= Moitaki =

- Village
- Location within Suriname
- Coordinates: 4°7′38″N 54°39′2″W
- Country: Suriname
- District: Sipaliwini District
- Resort: Tapanahony
- Time zone: UTC-3 (AST)

Moitaki is a Ndyuka village in the Sipaliwini District of Suriname. The village is inhabited by the Misidyan clan or lo. The late gaanman Gazon Matodya was born in Moitaki.

Moitaki is situated near the Gran Olo rapids between the village of Yawsa further upstream and Puketi further downstream.

== Energy ==
Between 1985 and 1987, electricity was provided by an overhead power line connected to the Puketi hydroelectric power plant. After this power plant stopped working during the Surinamese Interior War there have been attempts to rehabilitate the facility, but after a university delegation in 2003 and 2004 investigated the possibilities for hydroelectric power in the region, the Ministry for Regional Development decided to instead fund the construction of a larger hydroelectric power plant at the Gran Olo rapids nearby. Although it will initially only power Puketi and Futupasi, the plan is to eventually connect Moitaki to the grid as well.
