= Manlobi =

Manlobi Malobi
- Village
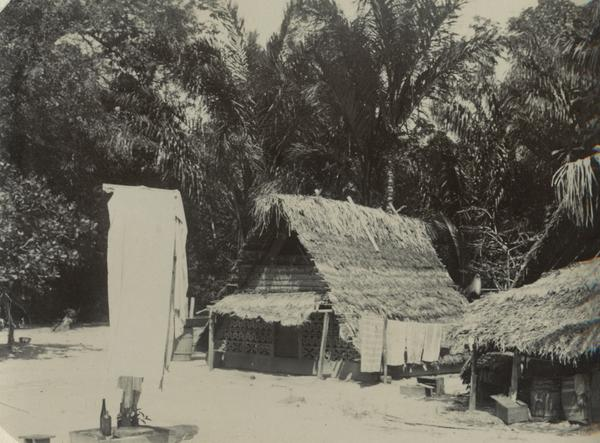
- Place of sacrifice at Manlobi (19033)

- Location within Suriname
- Coordinates: 4.268056°N 54.498889°W
- Country: Suriname
- District: Sipaliwini District
- Resort: Tapanahony

Government
  - Captain: Alikani Godo
- Time zone: UTC-3 (AST)

Manlobi (also: Malobi) is a village of Ndyuka Maroons in the Sipaliwini District of Suriname. The village is located on an island in the Tapanahony River.

== Overview ==
Man was built by runaways from the plantations. In 1797, it was reported that there was a village on this location.

Manlobi has a school, and a Methodist church. In 2010, a communication mast was placed on the Berayu mountain near the village, providing the village with mobile phone access.

In 2007, Freedom Resources, a gold mining company, procured a large concession on the left shore of the river and built a settlement near the landing ground with a supermarket. The mining activities have attracted skalians, illegal gold dredges, who pollute the river with mercury.

In 2009, the short documentary Trypps #6 by Ben Russell was shot in Manlobi.
