= Pamacca =

Resort in the Sipaliwini District of Suriname

Paramacca Paamakaliba (Eastern Maroon Creole)
- Resort
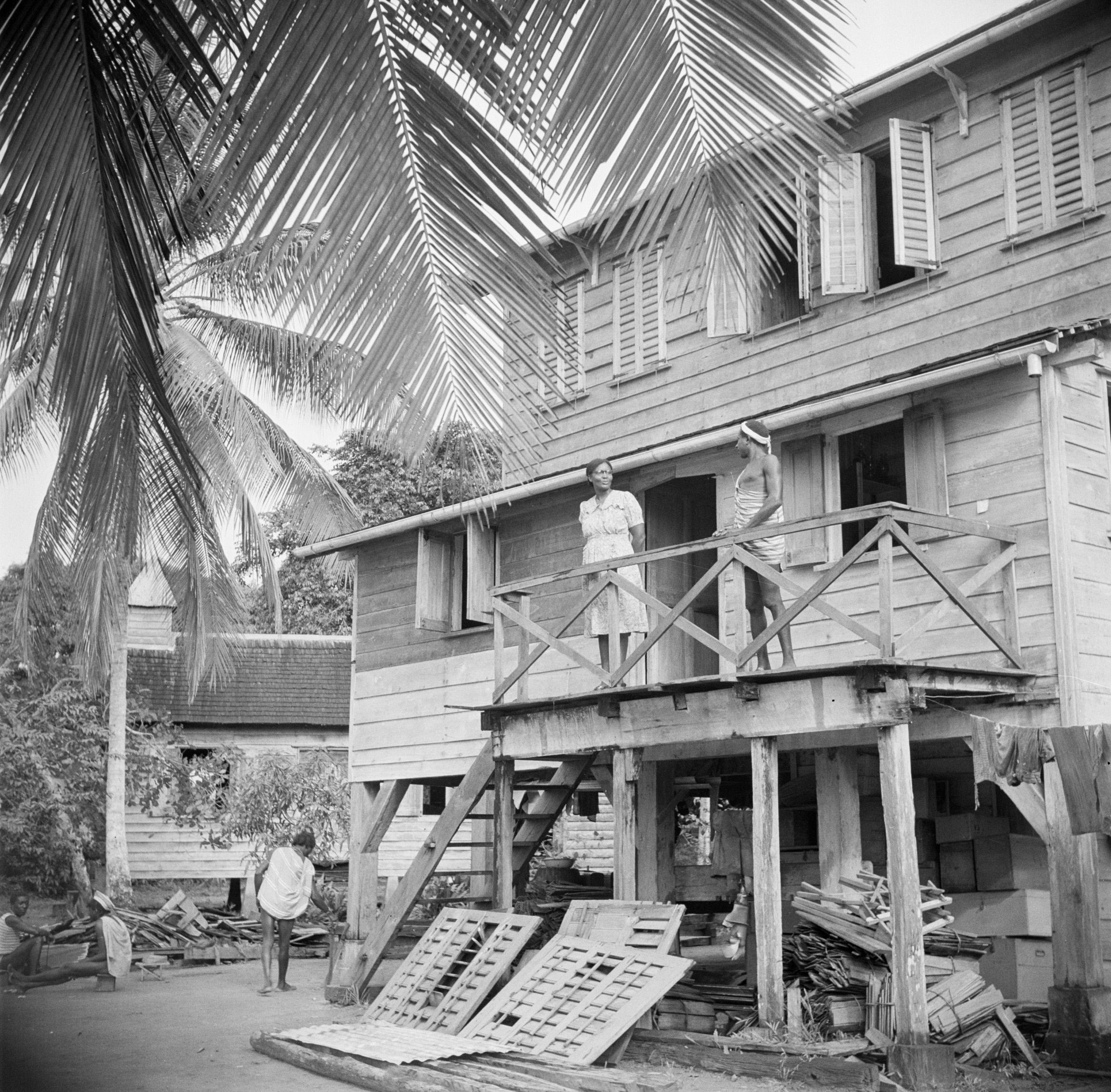
- House in Langetabbetje (1947)

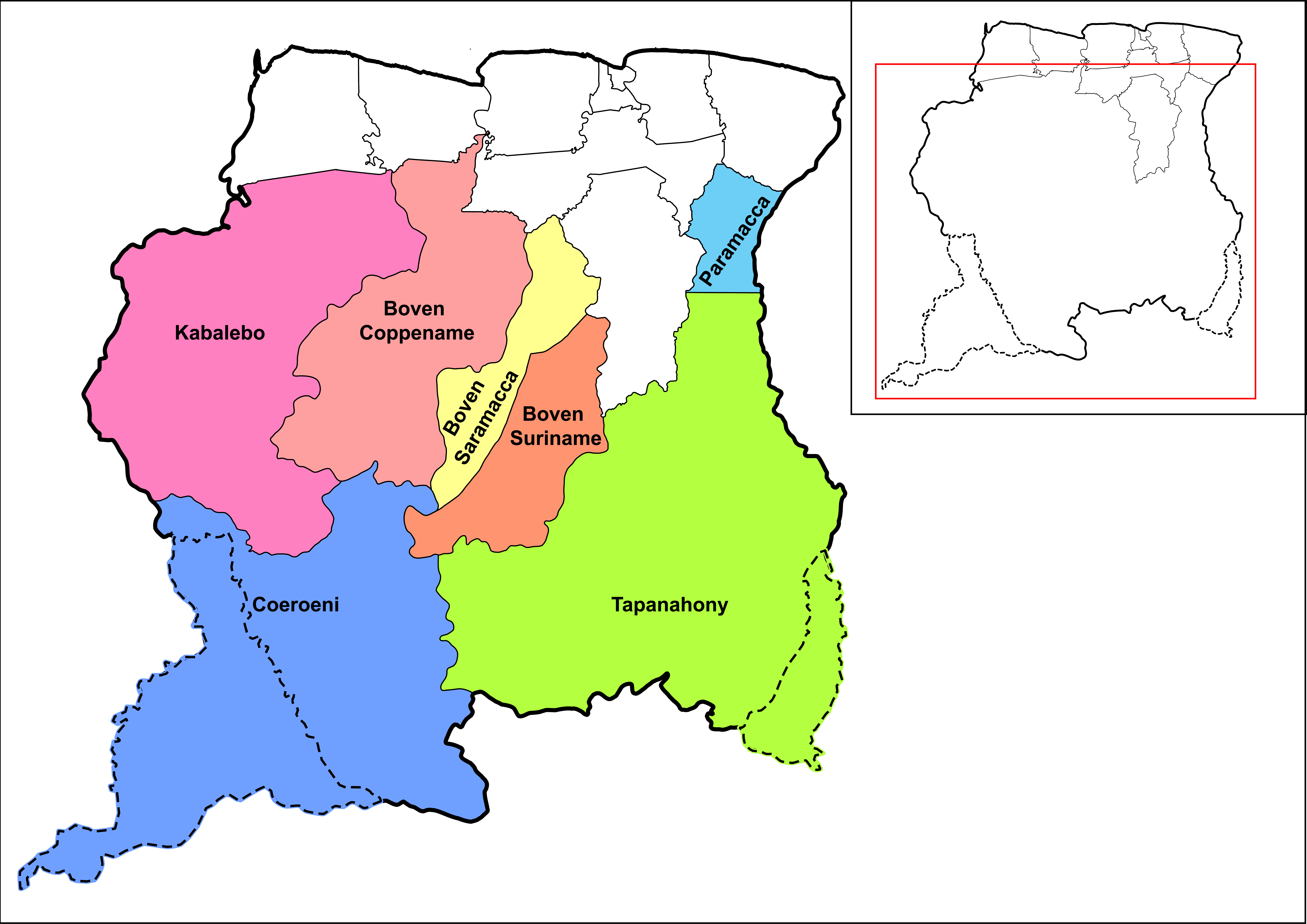
- Map showing the resorts of Sipaliwini District. Paramacca
- Coordinates: 5.0836°N 54.5475°W
- Country: Suriname
- District: Sipaliwini District

Area
  - Total: 3,233 km^{2} (1,248 sq mi)

Population
  - Total: 1,500−2,000
- Time zone: UTC-3 (AST)

Paramacca, also known as Pamacca (Eastern Maroon Creole: Paamakaliba or just Paamaka), is a resort in Suriname, located in the Sipaliwini District. The population is estimated between 1,500 and 2,000 people. In 1983, the Sipaliwini District was created, and the eastern part became the resort of Tapanahony. The Paramacca resort is the northern part of Tapanahony, and mainly inhabited by the Paramaccan people, the border of the resorts is the island of Bofoo Tabiki in the Marowijne River.

The administrative centre of the resort is located in Snesiekondre, and was completed in 2012. The District Commissioner for the resort is Margaretha Malontie.

The Paramaccans were runaway slaves who had made a peace treaty with the Colony in 1872. In 1879, a group of about 90 Paramaccans led by Apensa created a settlement on an island in the Marowijne River near the mouth of the Paramacca Creek. The town was named Langatabiki (Long Island).

The resort of Paramacca consists of the current area settled by the Paramaccans.

== Villages ==
The resort is made up of 13 tribal villages which are mainly located on the Lower Marowijne River, and is home to the non-tribal village of Stoelmanseiland. The main village of the resort is Langatabiki which is the residence of the granman of the Paramaccan people.

Medische Zending operates health care clinics in Langatabiki, Nason, and Stoelmanseiland.

Schools are present in Gakaba, Langatabiki, Nason, and Stoelmanseiland.

== Economy ==
A major part of the economy of Paramacca is gold prospecting by Newmont. Ecotourism has become an important addition in the early 21st century. Holiday resorts have opened near the Armina waterfalls, and Stoelmanseiland. Cassave is the main agricultural crop.

== Transport ==
The area can be reached by car via an unpaved road between Moengo and Langatabiki, from where there is access to the East-West Link. Plans have been developed to pave the road to Moengo, and built one road from Langatabiki via Stoelmanseiland to Benzdorp, and another from Langatabiki to Brokopondo.

Paramacca is served by Langatabbetje Airstrip and Stoelmans Eiland Airstrip offering Blue Wing scheduled services from Paramaribo.
