= Tutu Kampu =

Tutu Kampu Kulumuli
- Location in Suriname
- Coordinates: 3°34′38″N 54°57′5″W
- Country: Suriname
- District: Sipaliwini District
- Resort (municipality): Tapanahony

Government
  - Captain: Samé

Population (2006)
  - Total: 22

Tutu Kampu, also known as Kulumuli, is a Wayana village on the Tapanahony River in Suriname. The village consists of about five households and is headed by the shaman or pïyai Samé. The village acts as the border village between Wayana territory further upstream the Tapanahony River and the village of Granbori from the Ndyuka territory further downstream.

The village has a community house or tukusipan at its centre.
