= Antonio do Brinco =

Antonio do Brinco Albina 2
- Village
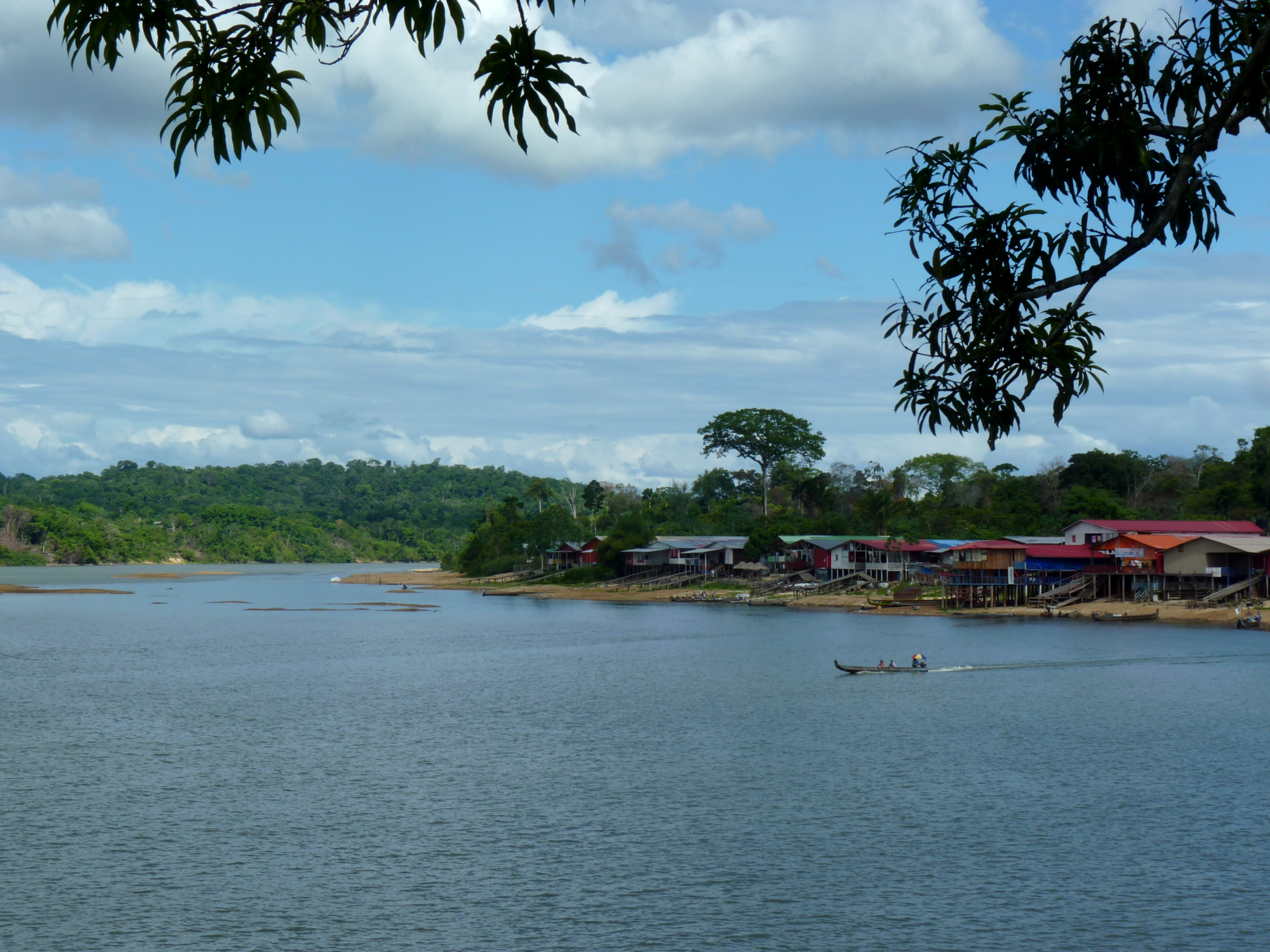
- Antonio do Brinco as seen from Maripasoula

- Location in Suriname
- Coordinates: 3°38′33″N 54°1′27″W
- Country: Suriname
- District: Sipaliwini District
- Resort: Tapanahony

Population (2015)
  - Total: ca. 1,000

Antonio do Brinco, also Albina 2, is a garimpeiros (illegal gold prospectors) village in the Tapanahony resort of the Sipaliwini District of Suriname. The village is located on the Lawa River, and is next to Peruano, and opposite Maripasoula in French Guiana. The village is named after Antonio with the earring (Portuguese: brinco) who constructed the first commercial building.

The village has grown rapidly in the early 21st century, and contains a string of supermarkets, restaurants, bars and brothels, who cater to both the gold prospectors and neighbouring French Guiana, because of lower prices. Many shops offer customers free transportation from Maripasoula with their boats and canoes.

The health situation in the village is dire. The river has been polluted with mercury. There are no medical facilities in the village despite a high prevalence of HIV, malaria, and during the COVID-19 pandemic, it was listed as a hot spot with many infections. As it was founded illegally, it is not listed as an official settlement and therefore has no school, no electricity other than private Diesel generators, no clean water supply, and no police station. There are plans to open a clinic operated by Medische Zending in the village.

== Bibliography ==
- Hoefte, Rosemarijn; Oostindie, Gert (2015). In and Out of Suriname (PDF). Caribbean Series 34. ISBN 978-90-04-28011-3.
- Plan Bureau (2014). "Planning Office Suriname - Districts 2009-2013" (PDF). Planning Office Suriname (in Dutch).
