= Oranje Mountains =

Mountain range in Suriname

- Location within Suriname

Highest point
- Elevation: 277 m (909 ft)
- Coordinates: 3°0′N 55°5′W

Geography
- Country: Suriname

The Oranje Mountains (Dutch: Oranjegebergte) is a mountain range in the Sipaliwini District of Suriname. It is named after the House of Orange-Nassau. Mountains on this range include the Roseveltpiek.
