= Puketi hydroelectric power plant =

Puketi micro hydro plant
- Location within Suriname
- Location: Sipaliwini District, Suriname
- Coordinates: 4°7′24″N 54°37′54″W
- Construction began: 1980
- Opening date: 7 December 1981

Dam and spillways
- Type of dam: run-of-the-river
- Impounds: Tapanahony River

Power Station
- Type: Micro hydro
- Turbines: 1 x Cross-flow turbine
- Installed capacity: 50 kW (67 hp)

The Puketi hydroelectric power plant was a micro hydropower plant constructed near the village of Puketi in Suriname, with a capacity of 50 kW (67 hp). The plant provided electricity between 1981 and 1987 before it went into disrepair. According to hydrologist Rudi van Els, the plant could be rehabilitated, but efforts are now focussed on the construction of the Gran Olo hydroelectric power plant nearby.

== History ==
Construction of the micro-hydro plant started in 1980 and was completed in 1981. The plant was opened on 7 December 1981 by President Henk Chin A Sen, and electricity was provided from that day to the villages of Puketi and Futupasi. Electricity meters were installed in the houses connected to the network, and an officer of the Dienst Elektriciteitsvoorziening (DEV) of the Ministry of Natural Resources traveled from Paramaribo to Puketi every few months to collect the bills. After initial plans to use the energy for a cassava mill and a sawmill were abandoned, neighboring villages began pressing for access to the network. In 1985, work began on a 7 kilometres (4.3 mi) long 12 kV overhead power line between Puketi and the Ndyuka capital of Diitabiki, which was also to connect the villages of Moitaki, Jawsa and Mainsi to the grid.

The power consumption of the villages combined exceeded the average of 33 kW produced by the plant, which caused the supply of electricity to be unreliable. To make matters worse, the overhead power line was constructed without lightning conductors, which made it prone to outages. During the Surinamese Interior War, which lasted from 1986 to 1992, the interior of Suriname was out of reach for technicians from Paramaribo, and as such the power plant stopped working somewhere in 1987.

In 1995, INGRO NV Engineering consultants proposed to rehabilitate the power plant, but nothing substantial happened before a delegation of the Anton de Kom University of Suriname visited the site in September 2003. This delegation under the leadership of professor Sieuwnath Naipal was sent by the Ministry of Regional Development to investigate the possibilities for hydroelectric power in the area, but rather than proposing the rehabilitation of the existing facility, Naipal set up a follow-up mission in February 2004 to investigate other sites nearby with the potential to generate more electricity. Going by the advice of Naipal and his team, the Ministry of Regional Development eventually decided to construct the Gran Olo hydroelectric power plant nearby. Although the most effort is now dedicated to the construction of the latter plant, the rehabilitation of the old Puketi hydroelectric power plant remains a possibility.

== Technical specifications ==
The power plant operated on one Michell-Bánki cross-flow turbine. The minimum hydraulic head was set at 2.5 metres (8 ft 2 in) and the maximum head at 4.6 metres (15 ft). The maximum flow rate was calculated for 1,390 litres per second (49 cu ft/s).
