= Lensidede =

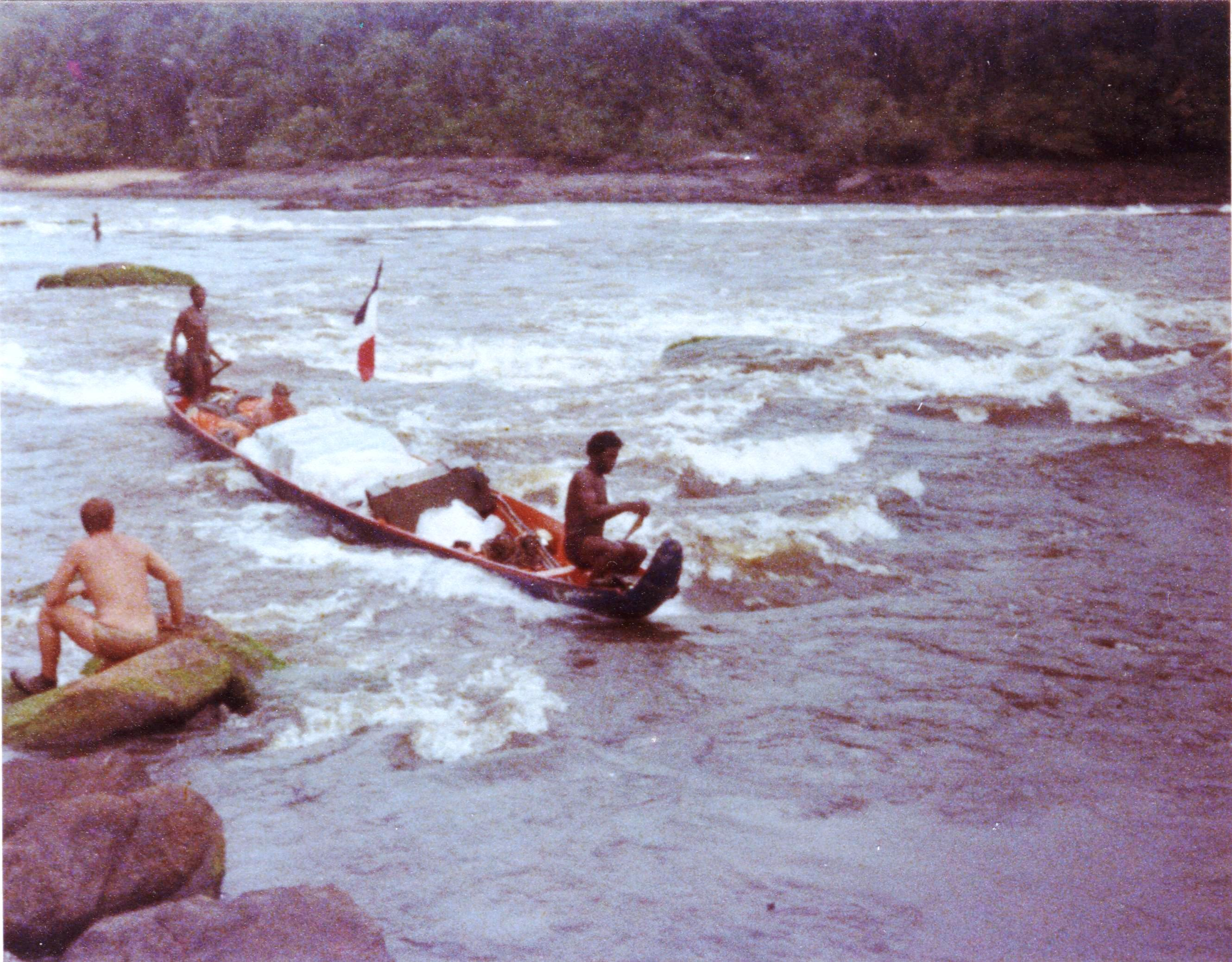
- The Lensidede rapids in 1979

- Location in Suriname
- Coordinates: 4.024167°N 54.327222°W
- Country: Suriname
- District: Sipaliwini District
- Resort (municipality): Tapanahony

Government
  - Captain: Akoewi Kanaido

Population (2022)
  - Total: 50

Lensidede or Lessé Dédé, is a Surinamese village on an island in the Lawa River, near the Lensidede rapids after which the village was named. In the village live Wayana people.

== History ==
The Lawa River forms the border between Suriname and French Guiana, and islands are ambiguous. Both France and Suriname claimed the village. In 2021, the islands in the river were demarcated. Lensidede has been placed in Suriname under the authority of Ipomadi Pelenapïn, the Surinamese chief of the Lawa River.
