= Snesiekondre =

- Village
- Location within Suriname
- Coordinates: 4.963611°N 54.443056°W
- Country: Suriname
- District: Sipaliwini District
- Resort: Pamacca

Population (2015)
  - Total: 150
- Time zone: UTC-3 (AST)

Snesiekondre (Sranan Tongo: [snesiekondɾe]), also known as Snesikondre (Sranan Tongo: [snei̯sikondɾe], both meaning 'China'), is a village of Paramacca Maroons in the Sipaliwini District of Suriname. The village is located at the end of the road connecting Langatabiki to Patamacca and the rest of Suriname.

== History ==
In 1977, a development plan proposed developing a new village on the road to Patamacca. The plan was cancelled in 1982 when the Netherlands withdrew all aid in the aftermath of the December murders. The idea was to concentrate the population in larger settlements.

In 2010, Snesiekondre was designated as regional centre, and an administrative center for the Pamacca resort (municipality) was constructed.

== Overview ==
The name translates to Chinese village, because the first store in the village was opened by a person of Chinese ethnicity. The development of Snesiekondre is related to the Merian Gold Mine which became operational in 2014, and is being exploited by Newmont. Newmont built their administrative office in Snesiekondre.

Several supermarkets, bars, restaurants, and a military outpost have been constructed in the village. In 2017, a police station opened in Snesiekondre. Snesiekondre does not have a traditional government, but is administered by the Surinamese government. The development of Snesiekondre as a residential area has not been very successful thus far. In 2015, the population was estimated at 150 people. For schooling and health care, the facilities of neighbouring Langatabiki need to be used.

== Bibliography ==
- Pamaka Development Plan (2016). "Pamaka Ontwikkelingsplan" (PDF) (in Dutch). NIKOS.
