= Aloepi 2 =

Aloepi 1 & 2
- Location in Suriname
- Coordinates: 2°48′N 55°54′W
- Country: Suriname
- District: Sipaliwini District
- Resort: Tapanahony
- Elevation: 260 m (850 ft)

Aloepi 2 is a village where mainly members of the Tiriyó tribe live. It is located in the resort Tapanahony in the extreme south of the Surinamese district Sipaliwini. Aloepi 2 is a twin village together with Aloepi 1.
