= Nason, Suriname =

Nason Amekan kondre
- Village
- Location within Suriname
- Coordinates: 4.8209°N 54.4690°W
- Country: Suriname
- District: Sipaliwini District
- Resort: Pamacca

Population (2010)
  - Total: 204
- Time zone: UTC-3 (AST)

Nason (also: Amekan kondre) is a village of Paramacca Maroons in the Sipaliwini District of Suriname. The village is located on an island in the Marowijne River.

== History ==
The village was originally known as Amekan Kondre after their chief Amekan. It has been renamed Nason after the Nassau Mountains which are visible in the distance.

The Redemptorists, Catholic missionaries, were active in the Paramaccan territory during the 19th and 20th centuries. In 1938, they founded the Anton Domici school and a library in the village. Because there were small isolated villages in the territory, the school offered boarding facilities. In 1985, the boarding school had a capacity of 21 beds. A healthcare clinic was provided by Medische Zending.

Before the Surinamese Interior War (1986-1992), Nason was one of the largest settlements of the tribe, During the war, the Paramaccans sided with the Jungle Commando, which resulted in a large-scale migration to French Guiana, and the destruction of the boarding school and clinic. The facilities have been restored except for the nearby Nason airstrip.

The economy of the village is mainly based on subsistence farming, and gold mining.

== Bibliography ==
- Pamaka Development Plan (2017). "Pamaka Ontwikkelingsplan" (PDF) (in Dutch). NIKOS.
