= Paramaccan people =

Maroon ethnic group of northeast Suriname

Paramaccan
Eastern Maroon Creole: Paamaka
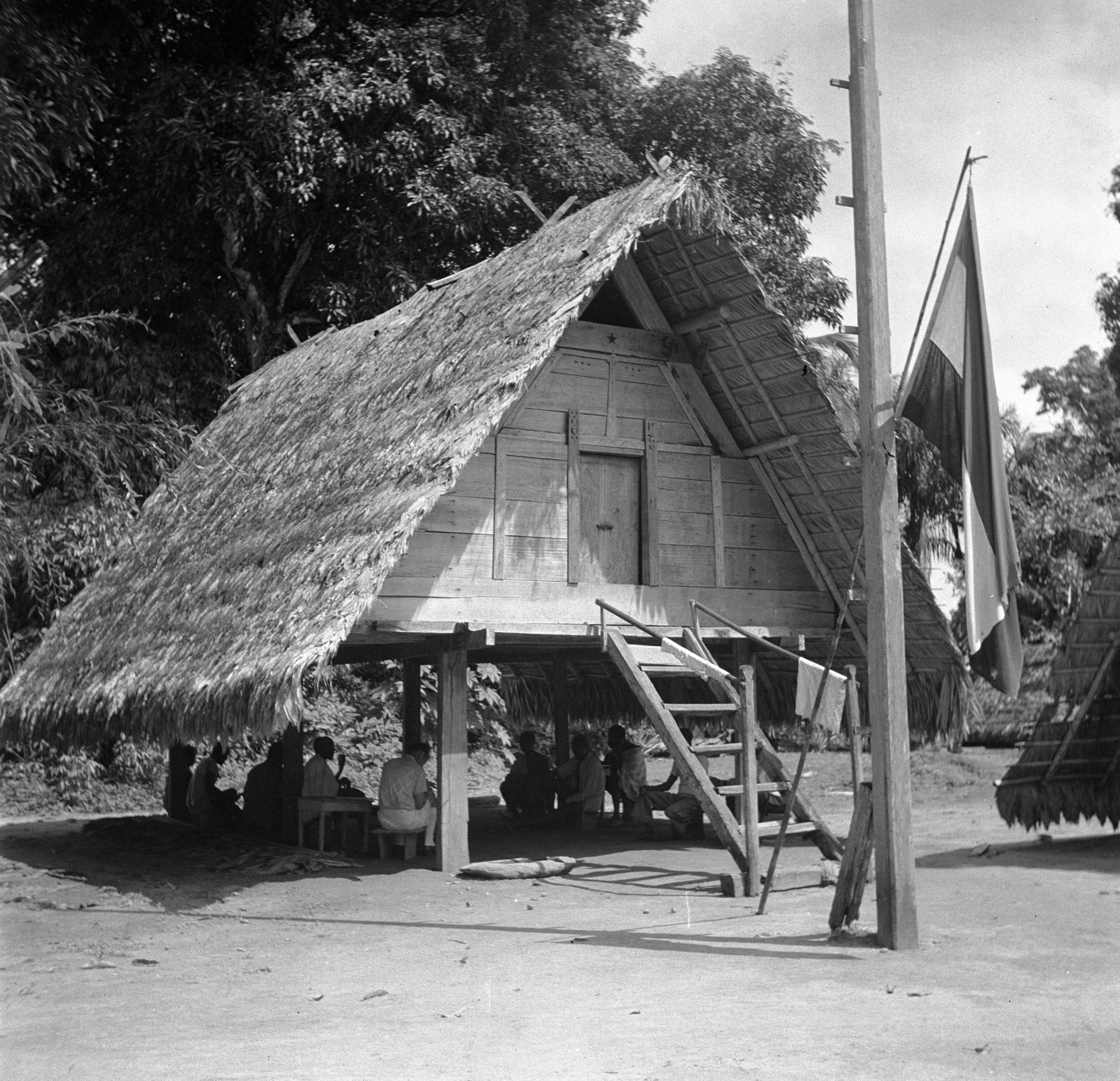
- Meeting under a pole dwelling in Langatabiki (1947)

Total population
- 11,000 (2014, est.)

Regions with significant populations
- Paramacca, Suriname: 4,300
- Urban French Guiana: 3,900

Languages
- Paramaccan

Religion
- Christianity, Winti

Related ethnic groups
- Ndyuka

Granman of the Paramaccan people
- Incumbent; Jozef Misajere Forster since 2020
- Residence: Langatabiki

The Paramaccans, also known by their endonym Paamaka (French: Pamak), are a Maroon tribe living in the forested interior of Suriname, mainly in the Paramacca resort, and the western border area of French Guiana. The Paramaccans signed a peace treaty in 1872, granting the tribe autonomy.

== Overview ==
The administrative centre for the tribe is located in Snesiekondre, but the main village of the resort is Langatabiki which is also the residence of the granman (paramount chief) of the Paramaccan people. The tribe controls 13 villages in Suriname, and the village of Providence in neighbouring French Guiana.

The total population in 2014 was estimated at 11,000 people with 4,300 people living in the tribal areas in Suriname, and 1,000 living in the interior of French Guiana.

== History ==
The Paramaccans were runaway slaves from the Handtros or Entros plantation who fled around 1830. In 1856, the August Kappler reported that the tribe had established villages near the Paramacca Creek. In 1872, they had signed a peace treaty with the Dutch colony giving the tribe autonomy, and Frans Kwaku, the leader of the expedition to Paramaribo, was officially appointed granman by the Governor. In 1879, a group of about 90 Paramaccans led by Apensa created a settlement on an island in the Marowijne River near the mouth of the Paramacca Creek. The town was named Langatabiki (Long Island). During the Surinamese Interior War, the Paramaccans sided with the Jungle Commando, which resulted in a large migration to French Guiana.

== Language ==
Paramaccan is also the eponymous term for their language, which is English-based with influences from Dutch, African languages, and other languages. It is similar to the languages spoken by the Ndyuka and Kwinti, and mutually intelligible with Sranan Tongo. Paramaccan is the youngest of the Surinamese pidgin languages. The language had an estimated 2,000 to 3,000 speakers in 1991.

== Villages ==
- Langatabiki (Suriname)
- Lokaloka (Suriname)
- Nason (Suriname)
- Providence (French Guiana)
- Snesiekondre (Suriname)

== See also ==
- Ndyuka language

Brother Mambo: Finding Africa in the Amazon, JD Lenoir with Phil Ceder (Kutukutu), Black Rose Writer, 2022.

== Bibliography ==
- Borges, Robert (2014). The Life of Language. Dynamics of language contact in Suriname (PDF) (Thesis). Utrecht: Radboud University Nijmegen.
- Marten, J.; Schalkwijk, W. (19 June 2018). Conference on Slavery, Indentured Labour, Migration, Diaspora and Identity Formation. Anton de Kom University.
- Plan Bureau (2014). "Planning Office Suriname - Districts 2009-2013" (PDF). Planning Office Suriname (in Dutch).
- Thoden van Velzen, Bonno (1988). "De Brunswijk-opstand: Antropologische kanttekeningen bij de Surinaamse burgeroorlog". University of Groningen (in Dutch). Sociologische Gids.
