= Gran Olo hydroelectric power plant =

- Location within Suriname
- Interactive map of Gran Olo hydroelectric power plant
- Location: Sipaliwini District, Suriname
- Coordinates: 4°7′33″N 54°38′7″W
- Construction began: September 2005
- Opening date: February 2017 (with limited capacity)

Dam and spillways
- Type of dam: run-of-the-river
- Impounds: Tapanahony River

Power Station
- Type: Mini hydro
- Turbines: 3 x turbine (planned)
- Installed capacity: 300 kW (400 hp) (planned)

The Gran Olo hydroelectric power plant is a mini hydro power plant under construction on the Tapanahony River in Suriname with a projected capacity of 300 kilowatts (400 hp), although initially only one turbine with a capacity of 150 kilowatts (200 hp) will be operated. The power plant will initially provide electricity to the villages of Puketi and Futupasi, but in the future extension of the grid to villages in the region is foreseen.

== History ==
Between 1981 and 1987, a micro hydro power plant with a capacity of 50 kW operated in the village of Puketi. Although in 1995 efforts were made to rehabilitate this facility, the delegation of the Anton de Kom University of Suriname that visited the site under the leadership of professor Sieuwnath Naipal in 2003 and 2004 proposed to build a new and larger hydroelectric power plant at the Gran Olo rapids nearby. On the advice of reports by the university delegation, the Ministry of Regional Development announced the construction of the Gran Olo hydroelectric plant in October 2005, which was to have a designed capacity of 300 kW. Stichting Fonds Ontwikkeling Binnenland (SFOB) funded the construction with € 325.000.

=== Construction ===
Construction of the plant started in late 2005, but was severely hampered by the flooding that affected major parts of the interior in 2006. In 2007, a renewed effort was started, although progress was slow due to the remote location of the site and the inexperience of the contractor with building a hydro power plant. In 2011, the first turbine ordered from Germany arrived at the site, and by 2012, the plant itself was completed and successfully tested.

Electricity could still not be provided to the villages, however, as the overhead power line to the villages was not completed. Work on the power line was eventually finished in November 2013, but as the transformer had not yet been delivered, the planned inauguration of the plant on 24 December 2013 had to be pushed back. When the transformer was eventually delivered in 2014, its capacity, which was designed for three working turbines, proved too high for the single turbine currently installed in the plant. By October 2014, a new and smaller transformer was about to be ordered, with the high-capacity transformator stored for later use when in the future all three turbines will be installed.

In February 2017, the plant started operating with an initial capacity of 35 kW.

== Technical specifications ==
The power plant is designed to operate on a hydraulic head of 3 metres (9.8 ft), with a minimum head of 2 metres (6 ft 7 in) and a maximum head of 6 metres (20 ft). The minimum flow rate is set at 15 cubic metres per second (530 cu ft/s) and the maximum flow rate at 50 cubic metres per second (1,800 cu ft/s).
