= Poeketi =

Poeketi Puketi
- Village
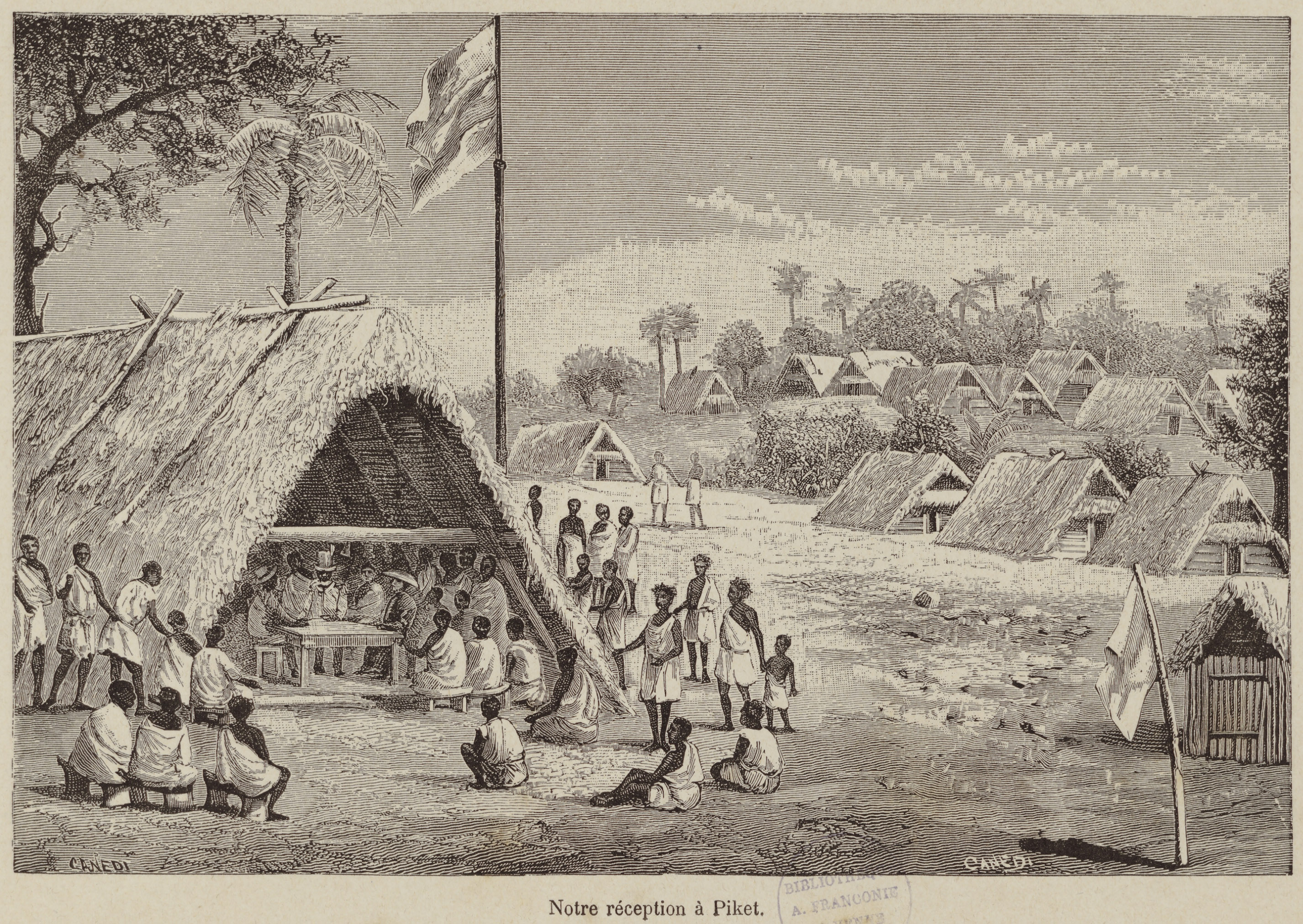
- Poeketi (1890)

- Location within Suriname
- Coordinates: 4°7′34″N 54°37′37″W
- Country: Suriname
- District: Sipaliwini District
- Resort: Tapanahony
- Time zone: UTC-3 (AST)

Poeketi or Puketi is a Ndyuka village in Suriname. It lies in Sipaliwini District. On May 15, 2010, a plane crashed near Poeketi.

== Energy ==
Between 1981 and 1987, electricity was provided by the Puketi hydroelectric power plant. After this power plant stopped working during the Surinamese Interior War there have been attempts to rehabilitate the facility, but after a university delegation in 2003 and 2004 investigated the possibilities for hydroelectric power in the region, the Ministry for Regional Development decided to instead fund the construction of a larger hydroelectric power plant at the Gran Olo rapids nearby. This power plant is still to be completed.

== Transportation ==
=== By air ===
Poeketi is served by Poeketi Airstrip, offering Caricom Airways scheduled services from Paramaribo.
