= Stoelmanseiland =

Village and island in the Paramacca Resort of Suriname

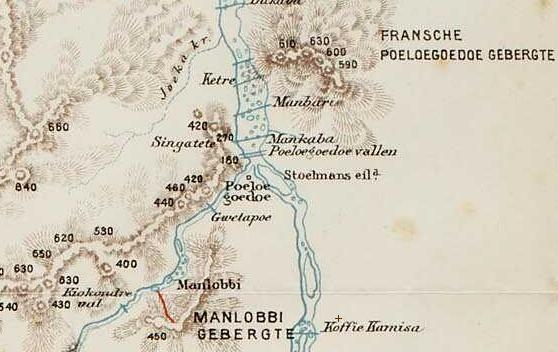
- Stoelmanseiland (1905)

- Location within Suriname
- Coordinates: 4°21′0″N 54°25′0″W
- Country: Suriname
- District: Sipaliwini District
- Resort: Paramacca
- Time zone: UTC-3 (AST)

Stoelmanseiland (or Stoelie) is an island, and a village in the Paramacca resort of the Sipaliwini District in Suriname. It is located at the confluence of the Tapanahony River with the Lawa River which forms the Marowijne River, and is also the border with French Guiana.

Stoelmanseiland was named after Philip Samuel Stoelman who founded a military outpost on the island in December 1791, during his fight against the Aluku.

During the Surinamese Interior War it was the headquarters of Ronnie Brunswijk's Jungle Commando.

== Johannes King Hospital ==
The Moravian Church built the Johannes King Hospital, a medical clinic which opened on 29 May 1958. It was named after Johannes King who was the first Maroon missionary, and one of the earliest authors in Sranan Tongo. The clinic is nowadays operated by Medische Zending.

== Transport ==
Stoelmanseiland can be reached via Stoelmans Eiland Airstrip which is located on the island.
