= Ndyuka language =

Creole language of Suriname and French Guiana

Ndyuka
- Ndyukatongo
- Ndyuka written in the Afaka syllabary
- Native to: Suriname, French Guiana
- Ethnicity: Ndyuka, Aluku, Paramaccan
- Native speakers: 67,000 (2017–2019)
- Language family: English-African Creole: Guinea Coast Creole English; Surinammese Creole English; Eastern Maroons; Ndyuka
- Dialects: Aukan (Aluku, Paramaccan); Kwinti
- Writing system: Afaka syllabary, Latin script

Language codes
- ISO 639-3: djk
- Glottolog: ndyu1242
- Linguasphere: 52-ABB-ay (varieties: 52-ABB-aya to -aye)

Ndyuka (/ənˈdʒuːkə/; Ndyukatongo), also called Aukan (Okanisi; Dutch: Aukaans), Businenge Tongo (considered by some to be pejorative), Eastern Maroon Creole or Nenge, is a creole language of Suriname and French Guiana, spoken by the Ndyuka people. The speakers are one of six Maroon peoples (formerly called "Bush Negroes") in the Republic of Suriname and one of the Maroon peoples in French Guiana. Most of the 25 to 30 thousand speakers live in the interior of the country, which is a part of the country covered with tropical rainforests. Ethnologue lists two related languages under the name Ndyuka, the other being a dialect of Lutos.

== Phonology ==
Ndyuka is based on English vocabulary, with influence from African languages in its grammar and sounds. For example, the difference between na ("is") and ná ("isn't") is tone; words can start with consonants such as mb and ng, and some speakers use the consonants kp and gb. (For other Ndyuka speakers, these are pronounced kw and gw, respectively. For example, the word "to leave" is gwé or gbé, from English "go away".) A distinguishing characteristic of the language is the elimination of the letter r, which is frequently used in Sranan Tongo.

There are also influences from other languages. According to Creolization and Contact (2002), 46% of the words were from English, 16% from Dutch, 35% from Portuguese, and 3% from African languages. (Note: The usage of exact percentages which add up to 100%, give a false sense of accuracy, because English and Dutch are related Germanic languages making it impossible to determine the source. To make matters worse, complex words in all three European languages are corrupted Latin.)

== Orthography ==
Modern orthography differs from an older Dutch-based orthography in substituting u for oe and y for j. The digraphs ty and dy are pronounced somewhat like the English ch and j, respectively. Tone is infrequently written, but it is required for words such as ná ("isn't"). The syllabic Afaka script was devised for Ndyuka in 1908.

=== Latin alphabet ===
- A – [a]
- B – [b]
- D – [d]
- E – [e]
- F – [f]
- G – [g]
- H – [h]
- I – [i]
- K – [k]
- L – [l]
- M – [m]
- N – [n]
- O – [o]
- P – [p]
- S – [s]
- T – [t]
- U – [u]
- W – [w]
- Y – [j]
- Z – [z]

=== Other letters ===
- dy – [d͡ʒ]
- ny – [ɲ]
- sy – [ʃ]
- ty – [t͡ʃ]

Long vowels are written with double letters (e.g. ⟨aa⟩ [aː], ⟨ee⟩ [eː])

An acute accent is sometimes used for a high tone. (e.g. ⟨á⟩)

== Dialects ==
The Ndyuka language has three dialects: proper Ndyuka (or Okanisi), Aluku, and Paramaccan, which are ethnically distinct..

Kwinti is distinct enough linguistically to be considered a separate language, but it is sometimes included as well under the name Ndyuka.

Ndyuka was also a basis of the Ndyuka-Tiriyó Pidgin.

== Example ==
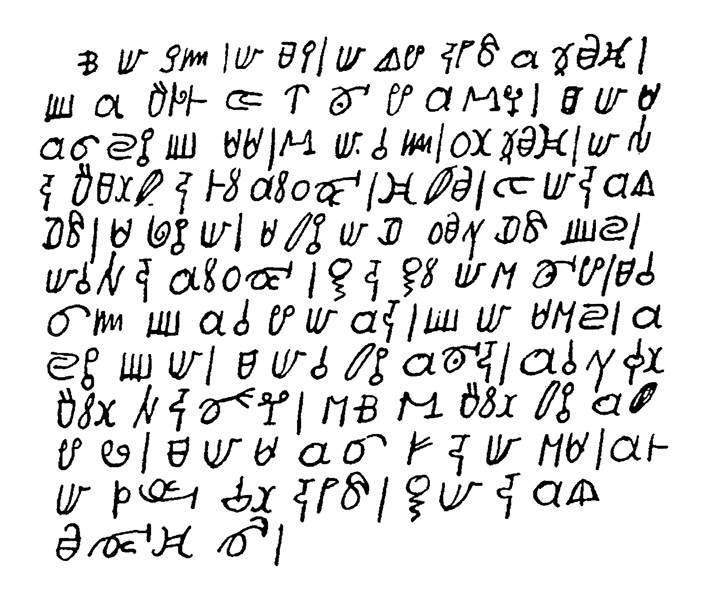
A Ndyuka letter written in the Afaka syllabary

Here is an example of Ndyuka text, and its translation into English (showing the similitarities as well as the lexical evolution), adapted from Languages of the Guianas (SIL Publications):

En so den be abaa na a líba, dísi wi kai Kawína Líba. Di den abaa de, den abaa teke gwe na opu fu Kawína. En so den be waka langa langa gwe te na Mama Ndyuka ede, pe wi kai Mama Ndyuka.

And so they crossed the river, which we call "Kawina [Commewijne] River". Having crossed it, they went way upstream along the Commewijne. Thus they travelled a long, long way, clear to the upper Tapanahony, the place we call "Mama Ndyuka".

The language bears some similarity to Twi and other Akan languages spoken by the Akan people of Ghana.

== Encoding ==
The IETF language tags have registered:

- djk as "Eastern Maroon Creole", "Businenge Tongo", "Nenge"
  - djk-aluku for the Aluku language
  - djk-ndyuka for the Ndyuka language
  - djk-pamaka for the Paramaccan language
- kww for the Kwinti language

== See also ==
- Maroon (people)
- Afaka script
