= Tebutop =

Mountain in Suriname

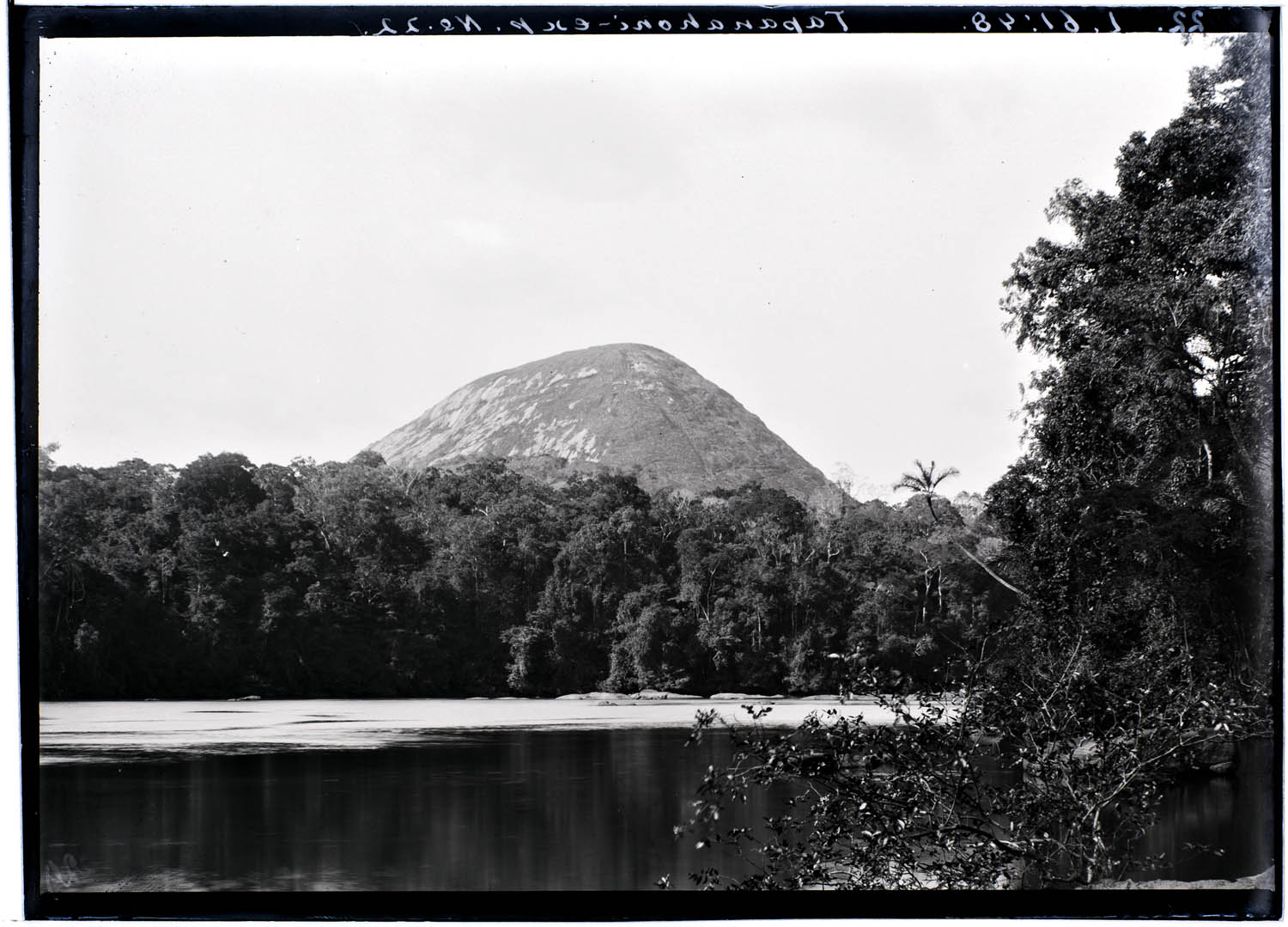

Highest point
- Elevation: 374 m (1,227 ft)
- Coordinates: 3°29′20″N 55°9′5″W

Geography
- Location within Suriname
- Location: Sipaliwini District, Suriname
- Parent range: Emma Range

Tebutop is a mountain in Suriname at 374 metres (1,227 ft). It is located in the Sipaliwini District.

The mountain was explored during both the 1904 Tapanahony expedition and the 1907 Tumuk Humak expedition. The mountain is sacred for the Ndyuka and Amerindians that live in the area.
