= Tapanahony River =

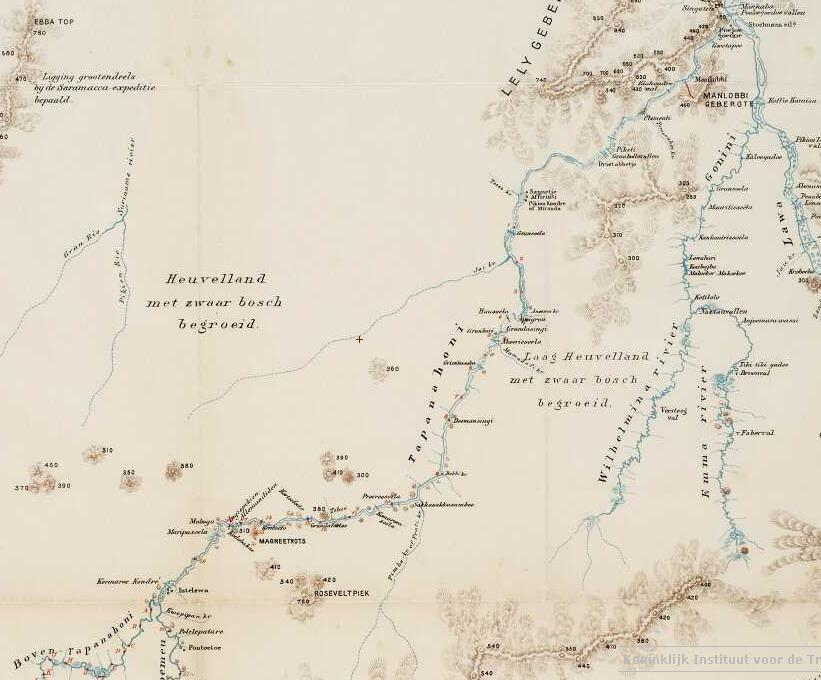
- 1905 map of the Tapanahoni River

- Location within Suriname
- Native name: Tapamawoniliba (Eastern Maroon Creole)

Location
- Country: Suriname
- District: Sipaliwini District

Physical characteristics
- Source
  - location: Eilerts de Haan Mountains
  - coordinates: 2.5681°N 55.9558°W
- Mouth: Marowijne River
  - coordinates: 4°22′N 54°27′W

Basin features
- Progression: Marowijne River→Atlantic Ocean

The Tapanahony (Eastern Maroon Creole: Tapamawoni or Tapanawoni), also known as the Tapanahoni, is a major river in the south eastern part of Suriname, South America. The river originates in the Southern part of the Eilerts de Haan Mountains, near the border with Brazil. It joins the Marowijne River at a place called Stoelmanseiland. Upstream, there are many villages inhabited by Indian Tiriyó people, while further downstream villages are inhabited by the Amerindian Wayana and Maroon Ndyuka people.

== Villages along the river ==
=== Inhabited by Tiriyó ===
- Aloepi 1 & 2
- Palumeu
- Pelelu Tepu

=== Inhabited by Ndyuka ===
- Diitabiki
- Godo Holo
- Moitaki
- Poeketi

=== Inhabited by Wayana ===
- Apetina

== Bibliography ==
- Bruijning, Conrad Friederich Albert; Voorhoeve, Jan (1977). Encyclopedie van Suriname. Amsterdam: Elsevier. ISBN 90-10-01842-3.
