= Alkmaar (disambiguation) =

Alkmaar is a municipality and a city in the Netherlands.

Alkmaar may also refer to:

- Alkmaar, Mpumalanga, a hamlet in South Africa
- Alkmaar, Suriname, a resort in Suriname
- HNLMS Alkmaar, two ships of the Netherlands navy

== See also ==
- Battle of Alkmaar (disambiguation)
