= 2025 Richelieu stabbing =

Knife attack in Commewijne, Suriname

- Location: Richelieu, Commewijne District, Suriname
- Date: 28 December 2025; 10 months ago c. 00:23 (UTC−03:00)
- Attack type: Mass stabbing; mass murder; child murder
- Weapon: Knife
- Deaths: 9
- Injuries: 3 (including the perpetrator) (Note: The perpetrator died by suicide a day later.)
- Perpetrator: Dennis Aroma
- Motive: Under investigation

On the morning of 28 December 2025, a mass stabbing took place near Richelieu, Commewijne District, Suriname. Nine people, including five children were killed and two were injured before the perpetrator, 43-year-old Dennis Aroma, was arrested after being shot by police. Four of the dead and one of the injured were the children of the perpetrator, who died the following day in jail custody in a suspected suicide.

== Background ==
The attack occurred on Hadji Iding Soemitaweg, located in the Tamansarie neighbourhood in the Meerzorg municipality of Commewijne District, about 25 kilometres (16 mi) east of Paramaribo, the country's capital. The neighbourhood is located immediately outside of Richelieu's main residential area at the Oost-West-Verbindung highway, close to Tamanredjo.

According to De Ware Tijd, which interviewed the son of two of the victims, Aroma was known for mental issues, which had led to separation from his wife earlier in the year. In the weeks leading up to the attack, he had been displaying aggressive behaviour towards others and started physically abusing his children. Police had been previously made aware of this. Aroma was temporarily held at Psychiatrisch Centrum Suriname at the request of his family, but released after a brief stay. He was receiving treatment by a psychiatrist at the time of the attack. Several neighbours, including some who were later killed in the stabbing, had come together to keep Aroma away from his wife and providing support to the family.

== Incident ==
Neighbours who were present stated the attack began after the attacker had a dispute on the phone with his separated wife. The conversation had been about picking up the children from the home, devolving into an argument after the wife refused to go to the address and said she would send someone else to fetch them. After the call, the attacker became erratic. According to police, the attacker first targeted his five children at their house. The youngest four, aged 5, 7, 13, and 15, were killed, while the eldest, a 16-year-old girl, managed to flee the scene with stab wounds, screaming for help. The perpetrator followed his daughter outside and attacked an elderly neighbour couple who went to help the girl, killing both the 68-year-old husband and the 80-year-old wife. He then entered the neighbours' house across the street and killed the couple's 7-year-old grandson and a 69-year-old woman visiting at the time, also injuring the woman's 72-year-old husband.

Both of the adult female victims were Dutch citizens from Rotterdam. The son of the elderly couple, a police officer, stated that his nine-year-old daughter witnessed the attack on his parents inside and survived unharmed by fleeing the building for another house.

Upon arrival of Regio Oost Police, the perpetrator attempted to attack the officers. The man was injured by gunshots in both legs during the arrest. After treatment for the wounds, he was held in remand on Keizerstraat. The other injured are being treated at Academic Hospital Paramaribo.

In the morning hours of 29 December, Korps Politie Suriname identified the perpetrator as Dennis Aroma and stated that he had been found dead in his jail cell. Police believe that he died in a suicide by hanging.

== Aftermath ==
Shortly after the killings were reported, the fatality count was briefly updated to ten, but later brought back to the original nine.

The Times of Suriname described the stabbing as "one of the most serious crimes in recent Surinamese history" due to the death toll.

The Major Crime Unit took over investigation and crime scene forensics, for which Hadji Iding Soemitaweg was temporarily closed off. CCTV footage was secured at the scene. Suriname's national police also called upon people to not share footage of the attack, which was widely circulating on social media.

Suriname President Jennifer Geerlings-Simons and Dutch Prime Minister Dick Schoof offered condolences. Surinamese justice minister Harish Monorath said the government would pay for the funerals of the stabbing victims. The murdered children were buried on 31 December 2025.

Due to the perpetrator's psychiatric history, the Surinamese government discussed improvements to mental healthcare. On 7 January 2026, the Ministerie van Sociale Zaken en Volkshuisvesting proposed increased government spending and a general overhaul for mental health system, with a special fund for immediate relief in "emergency situations".
