= Commewijne =

Commewijne may refer to:

- Commewijne District
- Commewijne River
