= Blauwgrond =

- Resort
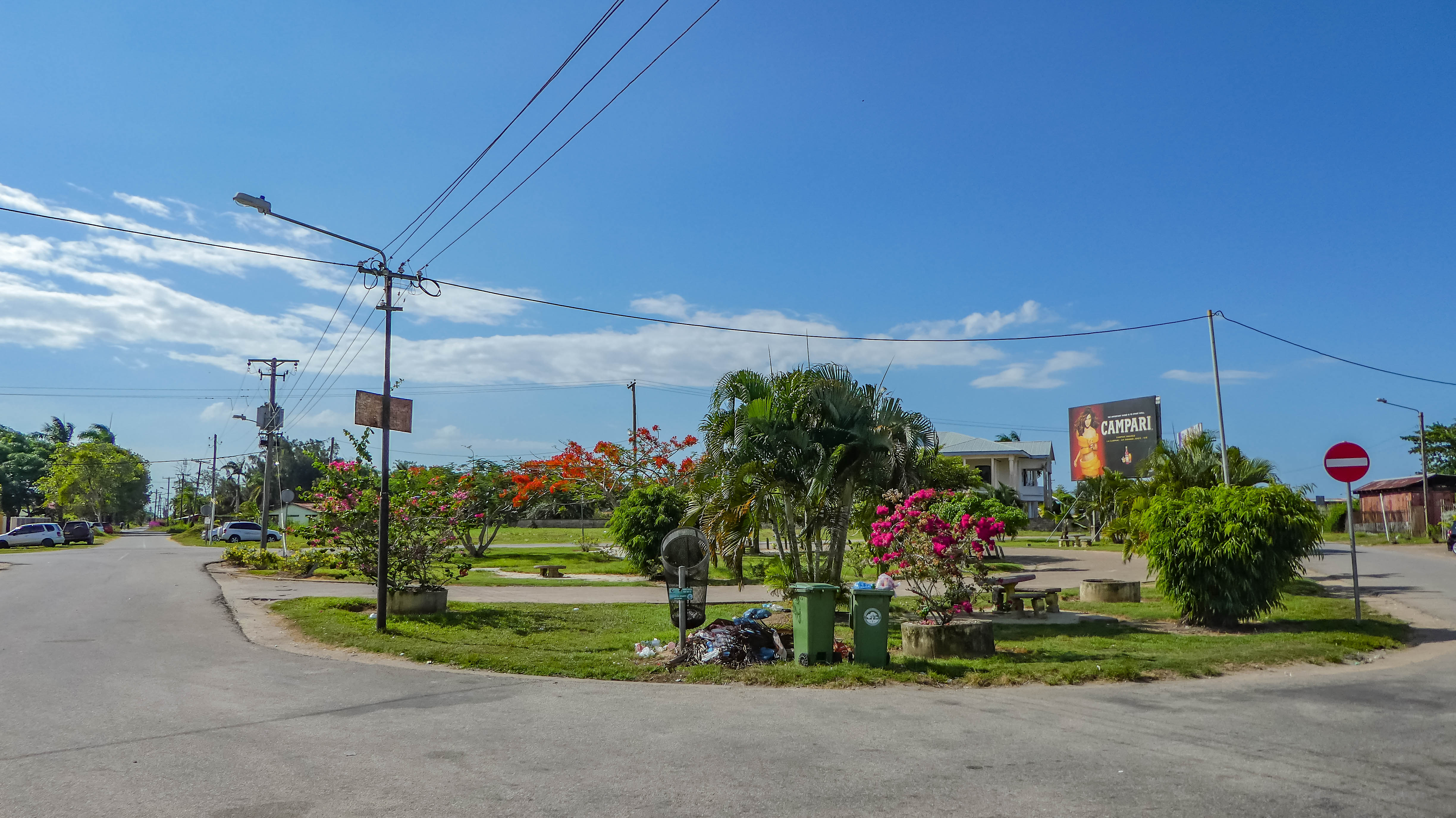
- Leonsberg (2016)

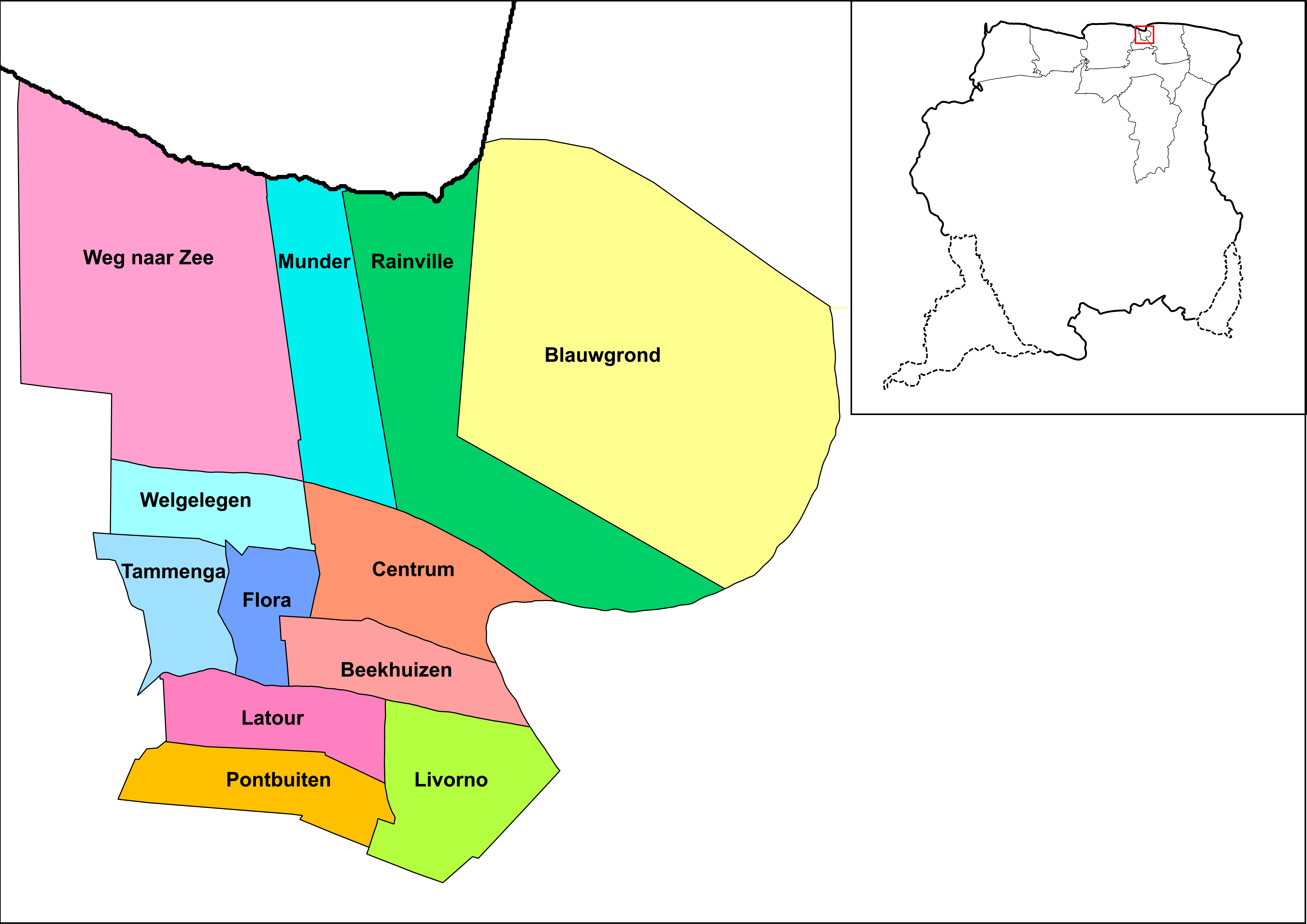
- Map showing the resorts of Paramaribo District. Blauwgrond
- Coordinates: 5.8659°N 55.1268°W
- Country: Suriname
- District: Paramaribo District

Area
  - Total: 43 km^{2} (17 sq mi)

Population (2012)
  - Total: 31,483
  - Density: 730/km^{2} (1,900/sq mi)
- Time zone: UTC-3 (AST)

Blauwgrond is a resort in Suriname, located in the Paramaribo District. Its population at the 2012 census was 31,483. Blauwgrond started as a Javanese village to the north of Paramaribo. During the 1960s and 1970s, large scale building projects turned the village into a neighbourhood of Paramaribo, and is mainly known as the Javanese culinary centre with many warungs and restaurants. The resort was called Blauwgrond (English: Blue Ground), because the earth had a bluish colour.

Leonsberg is a former coffee plantation in the northern part of Blauwgrond. It was founded by A. Léon in 1819. At Leonsberg there is a ferry to Nieuw-Amsterdam.
