= Braamspunt =

- Nature reserve and village
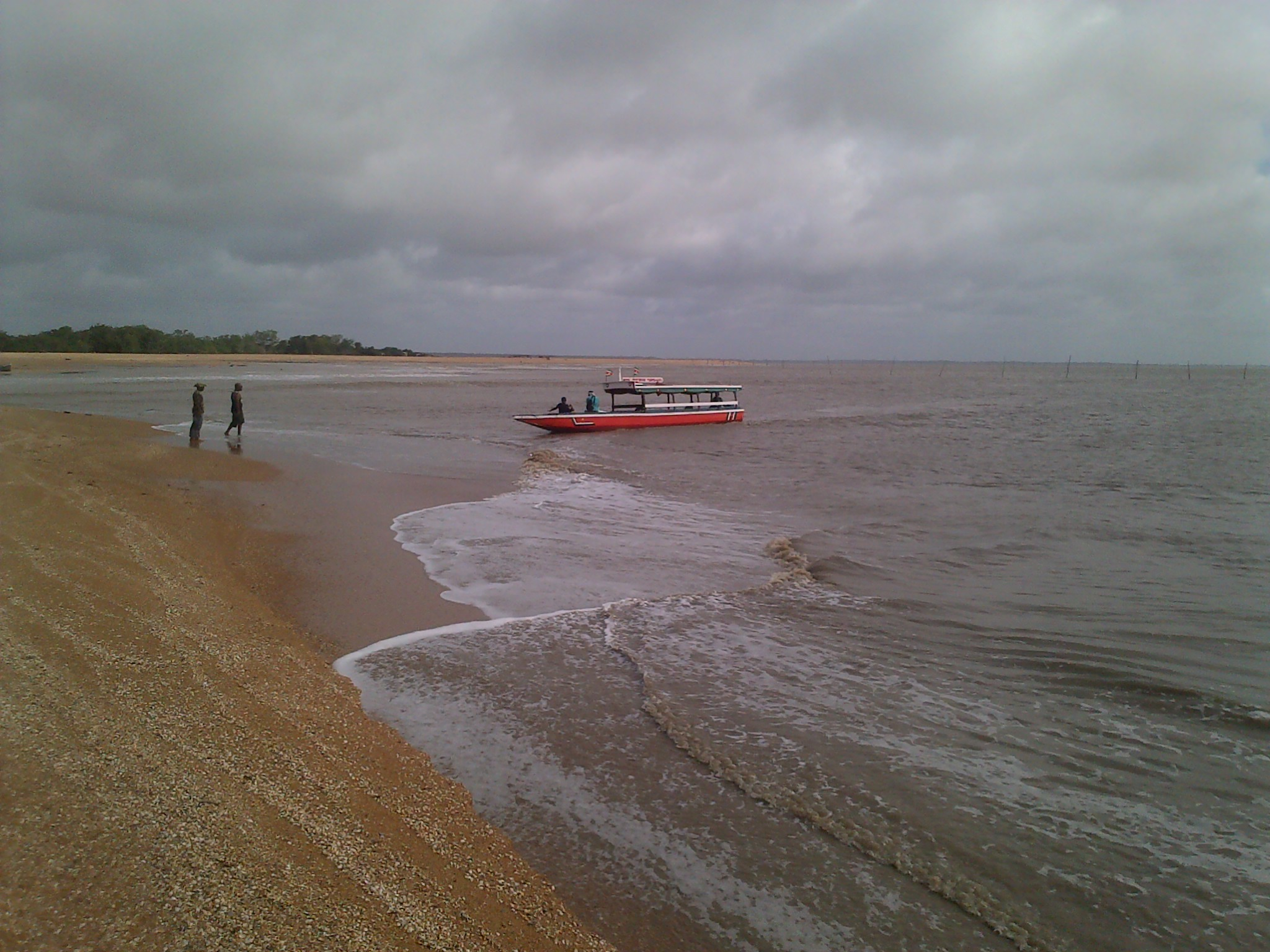
- Beach at Braamspunt

- Location within Suriname
- Coordinates: 5.9483°N 55.1627°W
- Country: Suriname
- District: Commewijne District
- Resort: Johan & Margaretha
- Elevation: 0 m (0 ft)
- Time zone: UTC-3 (AST)

Braamspunt is a nature reserve, fishing village, and a former military outpost in the Johan & Margaretha resort of the Commewijne District of Suriname. Braamspunt is the most western point of the Commewijne District at the combined mouth of the Suriname and Commewijne River. The capital Paramaribo is located to the south of Braamspunt. The name is a corruption of Byam's Point which refers William Byam who was a quartermaster of Willoughby.

== History ==
After Fort Nieuw-Amsterdam was constructed in 1747, a redoubt was created at Braamspunt to aid in the defence of the Colony of Suriname.

Even though Napoleon Bonaparte did not officially annex the Netherlands until 1806. Great Britain considered it a puppet state and started to eye the colonies. In 1804, the Royal Navy arrived in Suriname with 2,000 soldiers. The redoubts Braamspunt and Leiden quickly fell to the enemy, but Fort Nieuw-Amsterdam managed to offer resistance before it too was conquered. Suriname was returned in 1815 at the Congress of Vienna

During the 18th century, ships had to anchor at Braamspunt before being allowed to continue to Paramaribo.

== Nature reserve ==
Baby turtles race to the ocean

In the late 19th century, the strategic importance of Fort Nieuw-Amsterdam and its redoubts started to decline, and Braamspunt became a little fishing village with a tiny population. The area is a nesting ground for turtles. The most important being the leatherback sea turtles, and the green sea turtles. The area is also known for its diversity in bird life. A dolphin protection has been setup, because dolphins are frequently often spotted near Braamspunt.

During the 20 century, the importance of wildlife was recognized, and because Braamspunt together with Galibi Nature Reserve was one of the few remaining nesting grounds for the turtles, it was designed as bijzonder beheersgebied (special management area) in 2015 in order to protect the turtles, and the bird population. As of 2017, attempts were being made to prevent disturbance by day tourism.

Braamspunt can only be reached by boat from ferry terminal Leonsberg, Paramaribo.
