= Alkmaar, Suriname =

Alkmaar Gudufrow (Sranan Tongo) Alakhmár (Caribbean Hindustani) Likmár (Caribbean Javanese)
- Resort and town
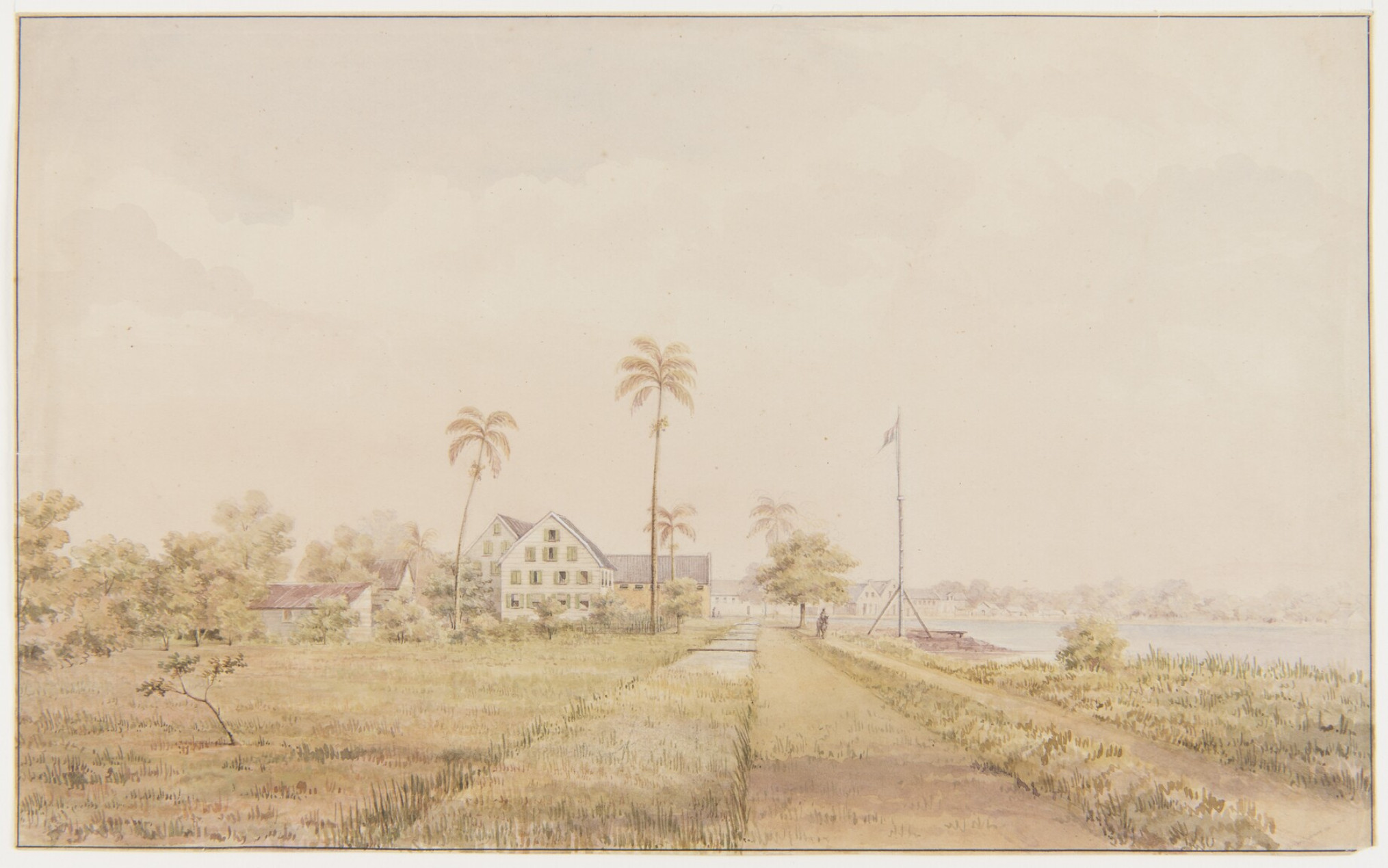
- The plantations 'Nijd en Spijt' and 'Alkmaar' (1860)

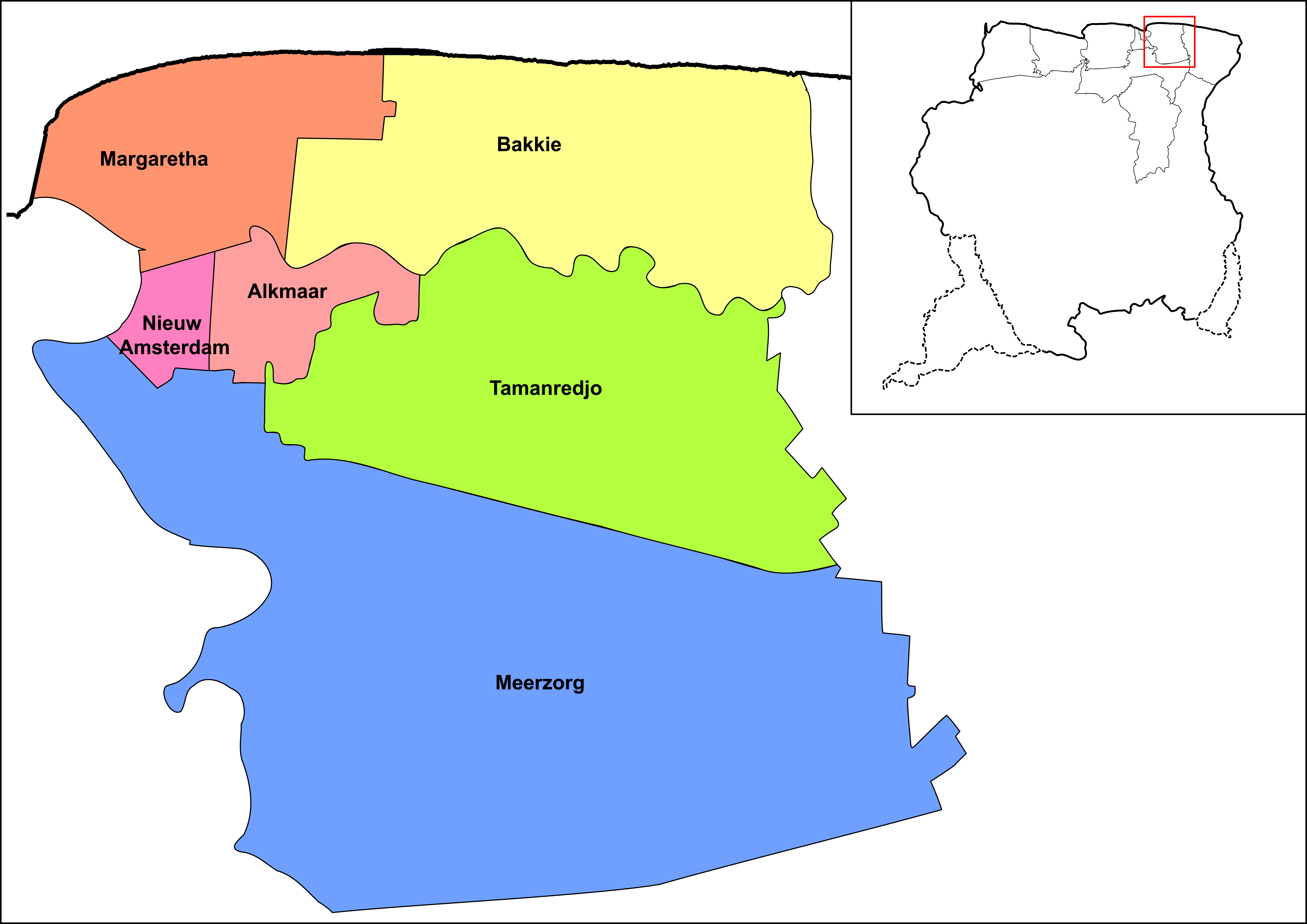
- Map showing resorts in Commewijne District. Alkmaar
- Coordinates: 5°50′0″N 55°1′17″W
- Country: Suriname
- District: Commewijne District

Area
  - Total: 81 km^{2} (31 sq mi)
- Elevation: 0 m (0 ft)

Population (2012)
  - Total: 5,561
  - Density: 69/km^{2} (180/sq mi)
- Time zone: UTC-3 (AST)
- Climate: Af

Alkmaar (Note: Sranan Tongo: Gudufrow, Caribbean Hindustani: Alakhmár or Alakmár, Caribbean Javanese: Likmár) is a resort in Suriname, located in the Commewijne District. Its population at the 2012 census was 5,561.

== History ==
The plantation was named after the city of Alkmaar in the Dutch province of North Holland where Jacobus Hengeveldt, the founder was born. The city was named after the plantation. Alkmaar has regional significance as a government post and a medical centre. The Moravian Church (EMEA) is an important center of Christian consignment among the Hindus, and started when P.M. Legêne arrived in Alkmaar. The church was built in 1923, partly financed by fundraising from the Netherlands. A children's home was also setup.

In the 18th century Alkmaar became a notable coffee producing location. Construction of the plantation was consigned to James Hengeveldt in 1745. After the completion of Fort at New Amsterdam in 1746, the land at the mouth of the Commewijne River was cleared to make way for the plantation which opened in 1747. Charles Godeffroy then took over the plantation. In 1884, the plantation ceased its operation due to low sugar prices. In 1894, the government bought the grounds in order to distribute it to small farmers. The motivation was to entice the indentured workers from Java to remain in Suriname. The Javanese still form the largest ethnic group. In 1908, there were 699 farmers producing 20,000 kg of cacao, 50,000 kg of rice, and 57,000 bunches of bananas.

The village and former sugarcane factory of Mariënburg is located close to Alkmaar. The villages of Johan & Margaretha and Frederiksdorp on the other side of the river, can be reached by a ferry from Mariënburg. The coffee plantation Katwijk is located in Alkmaar.

== Notable people ==
- Frits Mitrasing (1921-1996), lawyer and politician.
- Dhiradj Soekhai (1987), politician.
