= Suriname (disambiguation) =

Suriname is a country in South America.

Suriname or Surinam may also refer to:

- Suriname River, a river within the same nation
- Suriname (district), a former district within the nation
- Surinam (English colony), (1650–1667)
- Surinam (Dutch colony), (1667–1954)
- Suriname (Kingdom of the Netherlands), constituent country (1954–1975)
