= Marienburg, Suriname =

Mariënburg
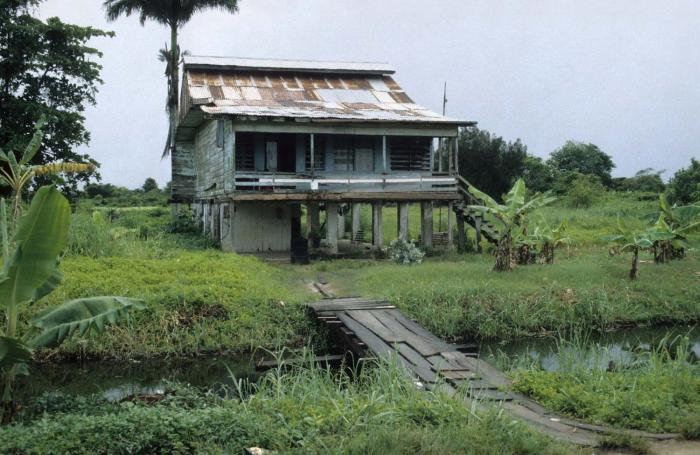
- One of the old laborer housing units on plantation Mariënburg (circa 1997).

- Location within Suriname
- Coordinates: 5.873611°N 55.048056°W
- Country: Suriname
- District: Commewijne District
- Resort: Nieuw Amsterdam

Population (2008)
  - Total: 4,427
- Time zone: UTC-3 (ART)

Mariënburg is a former sugarcane plantation, factory and village, situated in the district of Commewijne, in northern Suriname.

== History ==
In 1745, Mariënburg was founded as a sugar plantation by Maria de la Jaille. After several owner changes, the plantation became a coffee plantation in the 19th century. In 1882, the plantation, which had been abandoned, was purchased by the Netherlands Trading Society (NHM). The Society wanted to establish a central sugarcane factory, which had to be able to handle the surrounding plantations. To support the incoming supply of sugarcane, a 12 kilometres (7.5 mi) railway was built, the first railway in Suriname. On 23 October 1882, the cane processing factory opened. Soon after, one of the plantations dropped out, and the remaining production was not worthwhile. The NHM bought the plantations to keep the vast supplies of sugar running. On Mariënburg itself, sugarcane was also planted.

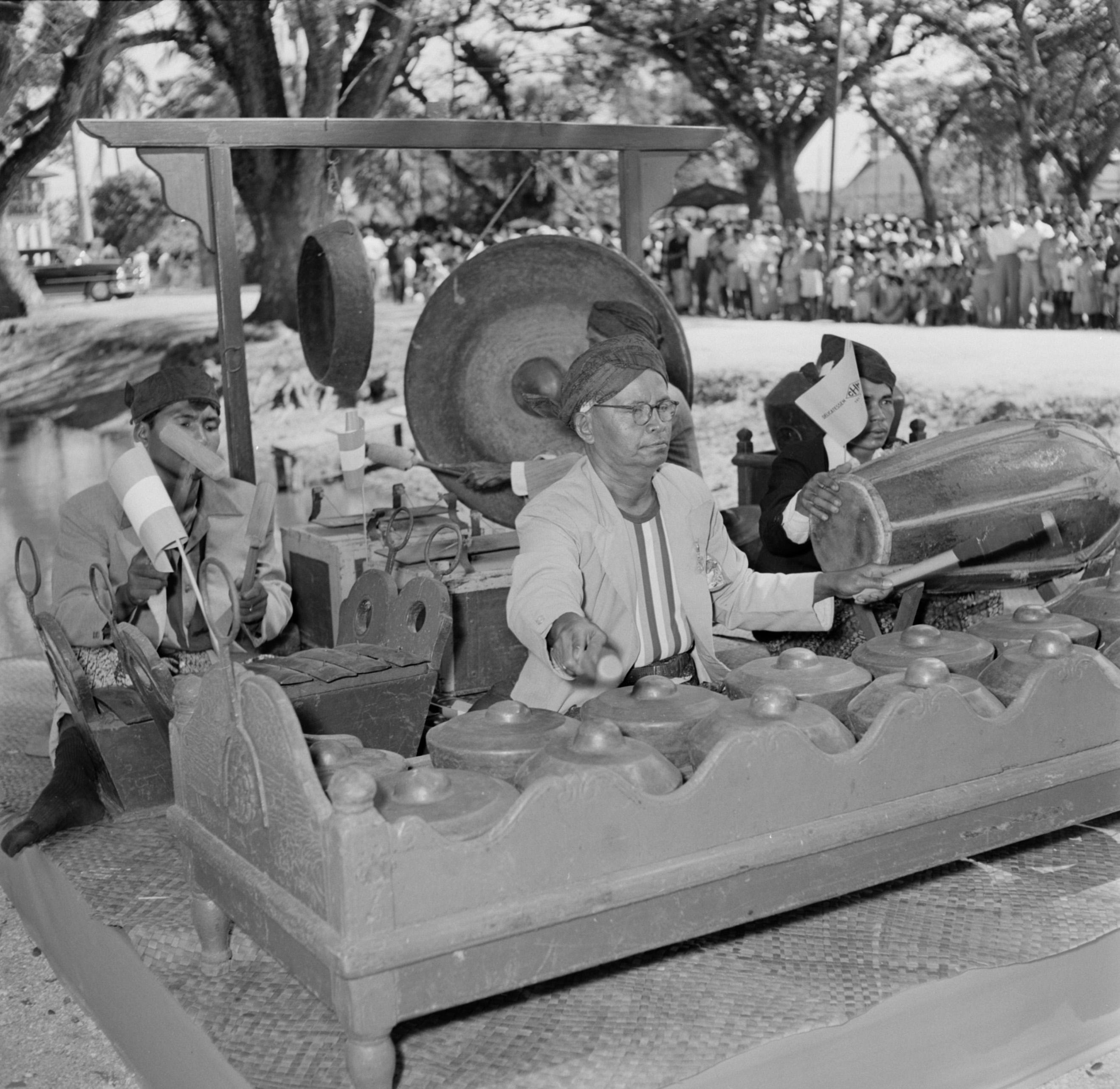
Javanese gamelan player, during the Dutch royal visit of 1955

The NHM took Javanese indentured laborers from the then Dutch East Indies. The first Javanese laborers arrived on 9 August 1890 in Paramaribo and were brought to Mariënburg. Indians of British Raj also worked on Mariënburg. On 2 July 1902, a strike broke out among them, because the NHM paid very low wages. On 29 July, director James Mavor was chased by the workers and killed. Later in the day, a detachment of the Colonial Army arrived at Mariënburg. The following day, on 30 July, people were arrested, after angry workers marched to the office. Shots were fired at the mutinous workers, resulting in 17 fatalities and 39 wounded, 7 of which later succumbed to their injuries, bringing the total number of dead workers to 24. Over a century later, on 30 July 2006, Vice President Ramdien Sardjoe unveiled a monument at Mariënburg in memory of the uprising and resulting dead, under the initiative of the Fallen Heroes Foundation of 1902.

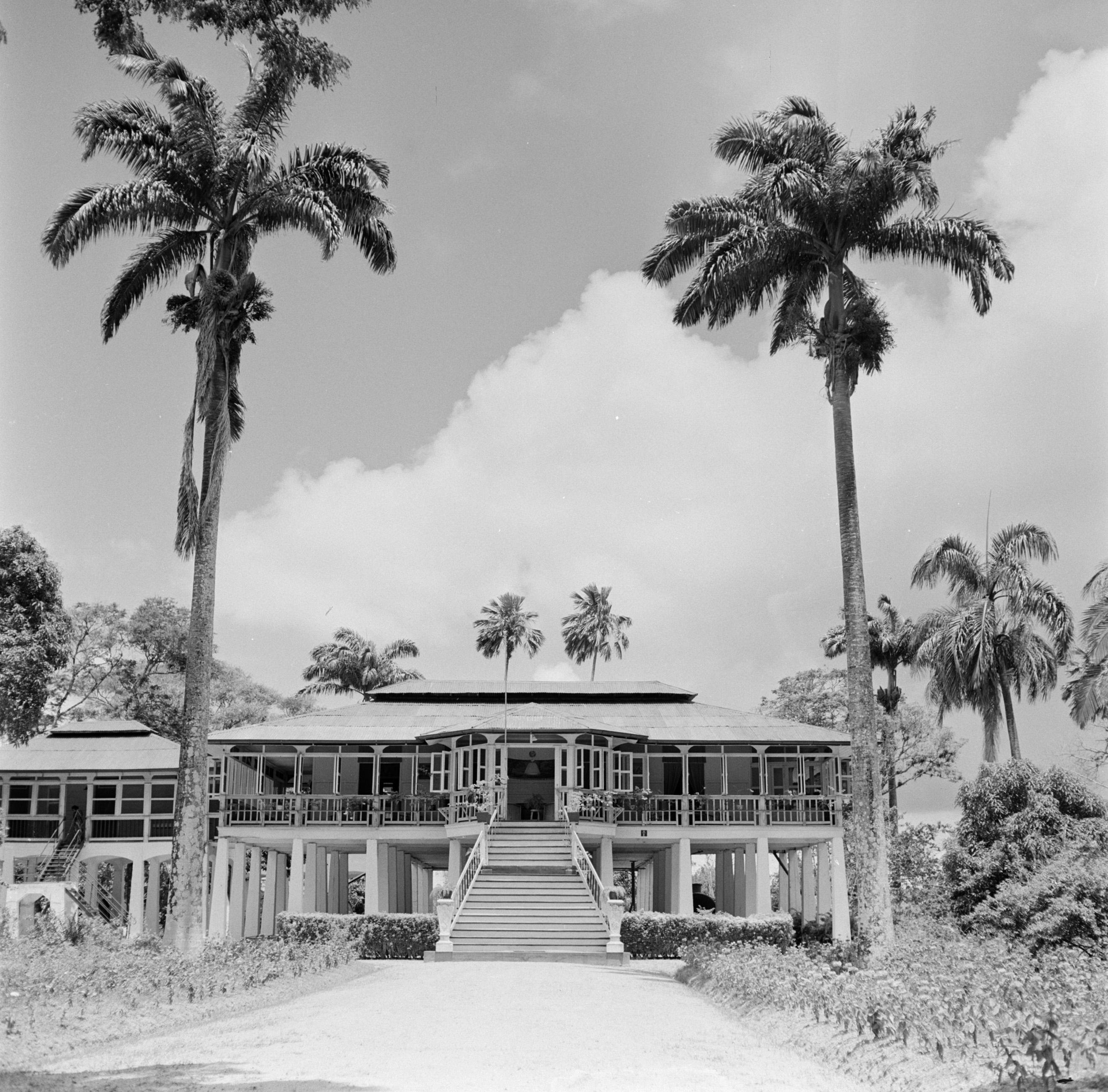
The sugar refinery director's house, in 1955

The factory closed in 1986, and the factory and its associated buildings are now a tourist attraction, despite the dilapidated state in which the site rests in.

== Transport ==
Mariënburg can be reached via Alkmaar and the East-West Link. The villages of Johan & Margaretha and Frederiksdorp can be reached by a ferry from Mariënburg.
