= Prostitution in Suriname =

Prostitution in Suriname is illegal but widespread and the laws are rarely enforced. Human trafficking and Child prostitution are problems in the country. Prostitutes are known locally as "motyo". UNAIDS estimate there to be 2,228 prostitutes in the country.

Although prostitution is illegal, the country issues temporary work permits to migrant prostitutes travelling through Suriname en route to another country.

Prostitutes often rent rooms in hotels and attract clients in the hotel's bar or outside the hotel.

== Law enforcement ==
Prostitution is generally tolerated and the laws forbidding it are not enforced. Laws that tend to be enforced, at least to some degree, are those prohibiting human trafficking, child prostitution and soliciting outside unofficially tolerated areas.

Brothels are usually tolerated unless there is trouble or if women are working there against their will. Police regularly visit the brothels and may act as intermediaries in disputes between the prostitutes and brothel owners. The police sometimes work as 'advisors' to the brothels and assist in getting work visas for the women.

=== World War II ===
During World War II, American soldiers were stationed in Suriname to protect the vital bauxite industry and to build an airbase at Zanderij which is nowadays called Johan Adolf Pengel International Airport. There were concerns about sexually transmitted diseases. In 1942, in anticipation of the visit of Princess Juliana of the Netherlands, all prostitutes were interned at Katwijk. They were released in 1944 when the American soldiers were replaced by soldiers from Puerto Rico.

== Red-light districts ==
In the capital Paramaribo, the red-light district is located in the area of Watermolenstraat, Timmermanstraat, Hoek Hogestraat, Zwartenhovenbrugstraat and Crommelinstraat. These streets are known for their street walkers. The sex workers, mainly from Guyana are fully visible and practice their work relatively undisturbed.

== Gold Mining ==
In the interior of Suriname there are a number of official and unofficial gold mines. A lot of men work at the mines, especially Brazilians. In the mining areas there are a large number of prostitutes to service the needs of the miners. There are many foreign women who come to work in the gold fields (Brazilians, Dominicans, Guyanese and French) as well as native Surinamese prostitutes. Brazilian prostitutes can earn three times the amount in the mining area than they can at home. Some women will take payment in gold nuggets. There is evidence of Child prostitution in the area.

Prostitutes generally live in "women's camps", a series of huts, near the mining camps where the women live and receive their clients. There are also some bars around the mining camps, the prostitutes in these bars are generally recruited and employed by the owner. Some miners have a prostitute as a "temporary wives" for a period of 3 months. The women look after the miner's domestic needs as well as their sexual ones. This arrangement is usually made through a mining foreman who recruits and pays women from Brazil in return for 10% of the miner's wages.

In 2011, the government introduced a scheme to register all workers in the mining areas, including sex workers. The object was to enable the government to collect taxes from the workers.

== Sex Trafficking ==
Suriname is principally a destination and transit country for men, women, and children trafficked transnationally for the purposes of commercial sexual exploitation and forced labor. It is also a source country for underage Surinamese girls, and increasingly boys, trafficked internally for sexual exploitation. Some of these children are trafficked into the sex trade surrounding gold mining camps in the country's interior. Foreign girls and women from Guyana, Brazil, the Dominican Republic, and Colombia are trafficked into Suriname for commercial sexual exploitation; some transit Suriname en route to Europe.

According to 'Trafficking in Persons Report', Some Chinese women engage in prostitution in massage parlors and brothels in Suriname.

The United States Department of State Office to Monitor and Combat Trafficking in Persons ranks Suriname as a 'Tier 2 Watch List' country.

== See also ==
- Maxi Linder (1902–1981), Surinamese prostitute and madame.
