= Katwijk, Suriname =

Katwijk Juliansi
- Coffee plantation and village
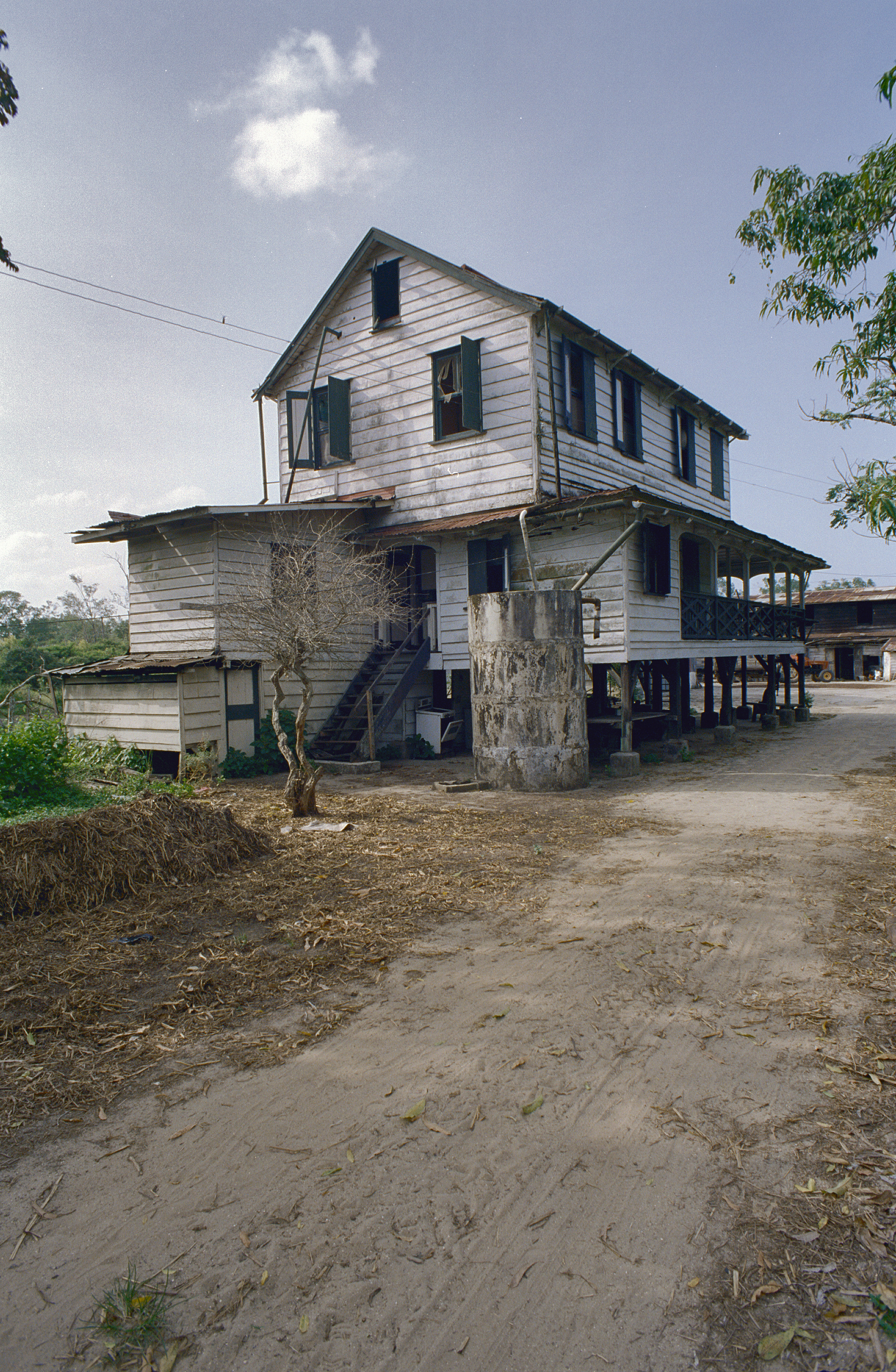

- Position in Suriname
- Coordinates: 5.863333°N 54.996111°W
- Country: Suriname
- District: Commewijne District
- Resort: Alkmaar

Area
  - Total: 3.64 km^{2} (1.41 sq mi)
- Time zone: UTC-3 (AST)

Katwijk (Sranan Tongo: Juliansi) is coffee plantation and village in the Alkmaar resort of the Commewijne District of Suriname. It is the only coffee plantation in Suriname which is still in operation. During World War II, Katwijk was an internment camp for prostitutes.

== History ==
In 1746, the land was sold to the 13-year old Alida Maria Wossink. Wossink married three times, and transformed the land into a successful coffee plantation. According to John Gabriel Stedman, she was one of the worst slave holders. In the middle of the 19th century, the plantation temporarily switched to growing bananas. In the early 20th century, 196 contract workers from Java were hired to work on the plantation.

During World War II, American soldiers were stationed in Suriname. There were concerns about sexually transmitted diseases. In 1942, in anticipation of the visit of Princess Juliana of the Netherlands, all prostitutes were interned at Katwijk. Maxi Linder, the well-known Surinamese prostitute, was among those arrested. They were released in 1944 when the American soldiers were replaced by soldiers from Puerto Rico.

In 1974, Hendrik Gonggrijp sold the plantation to Nagib Nouh-Chaia who turned the plantation into a successful plantation. In 1979, a coffee-roasting factory was built on the plantation. The coffee is mainly sold within Suriname. The houses for the workers are still inhabited.
