= Ferry terminal Leonsberg =

Ferry jetty in Suriname

Coordinates: 5°52′11.708″N 55°5′58.733″W

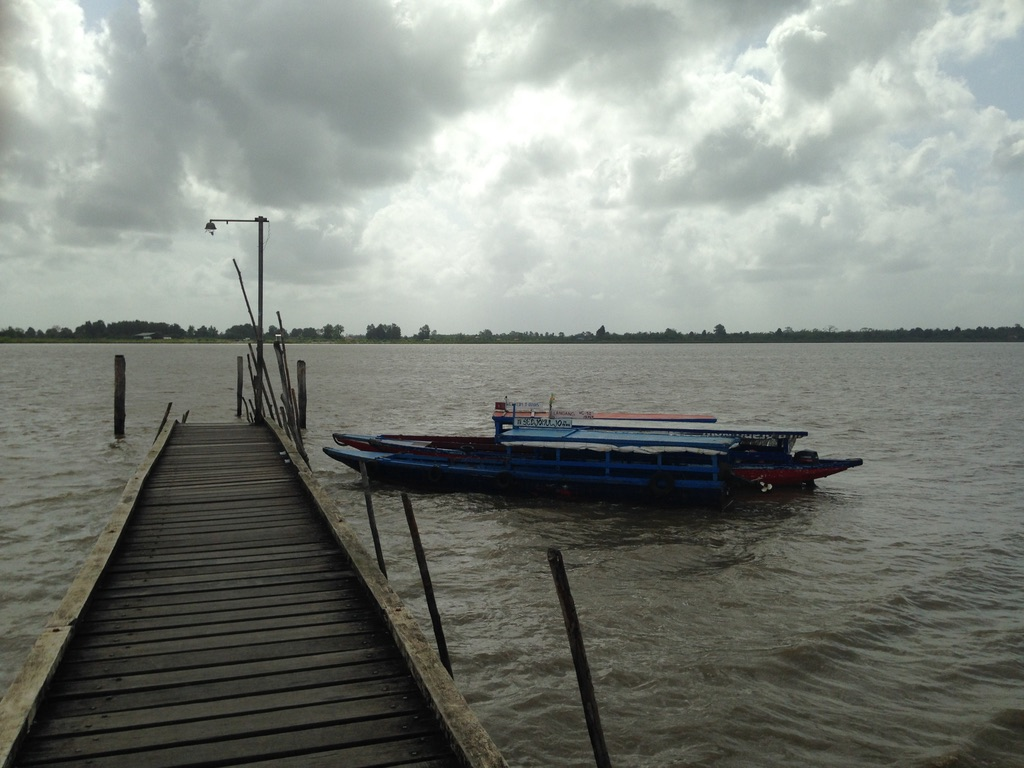
- Locale: Blauwgrond, Paramaribo; Suriname
- Waterway: Suriname River
- Transit type: Passenger ferry Excursions; Sightseeing
- Began operation: 1913
- No. of lines: Nieuw Amsterdam, Braamspunt

The Ferry terminal Leonsberg (Dutch: Veersteiger Leonsberg) is a ferry jetty in the north of Paramaribo, Suriname. From here various private operators offer transport service the other side of the Suriname river and the Commewijne River.

== History ==
The construction of the terminal was commissioned in 1913 and shortly after constructed with the aim to start a daily ferry service between the plantations Leonsberg and Voorburg. The first ferry was a motorboat called the "Veerpont No. 1. This daily service was terminated in 1952. Since 1952, various operators offer on demand crossings. Current service include Nieuw Amsterdam and Braamspunt.
