= Tamanredjo =

- Resort and town
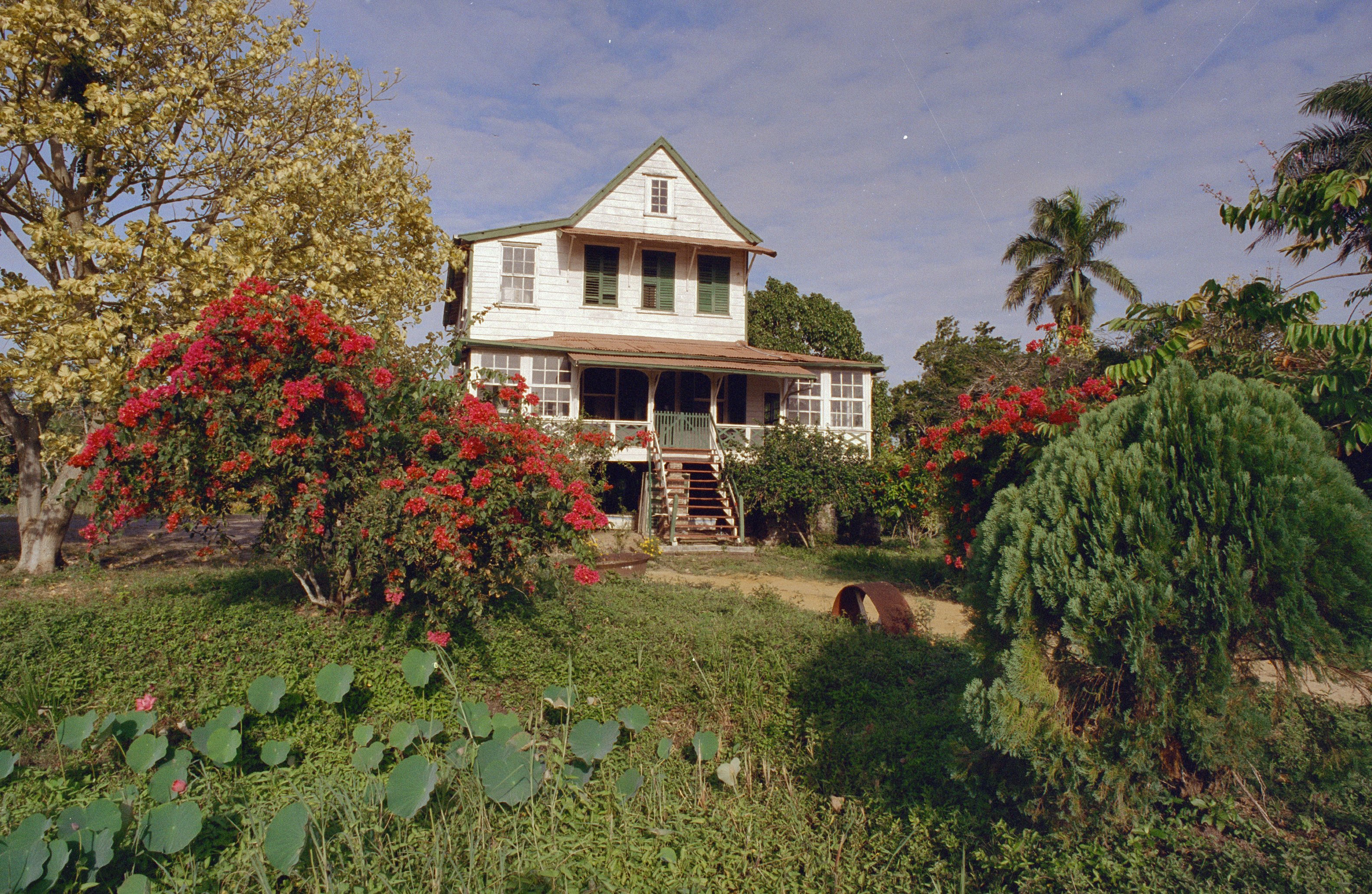
- Director's house in Sorgvliet.

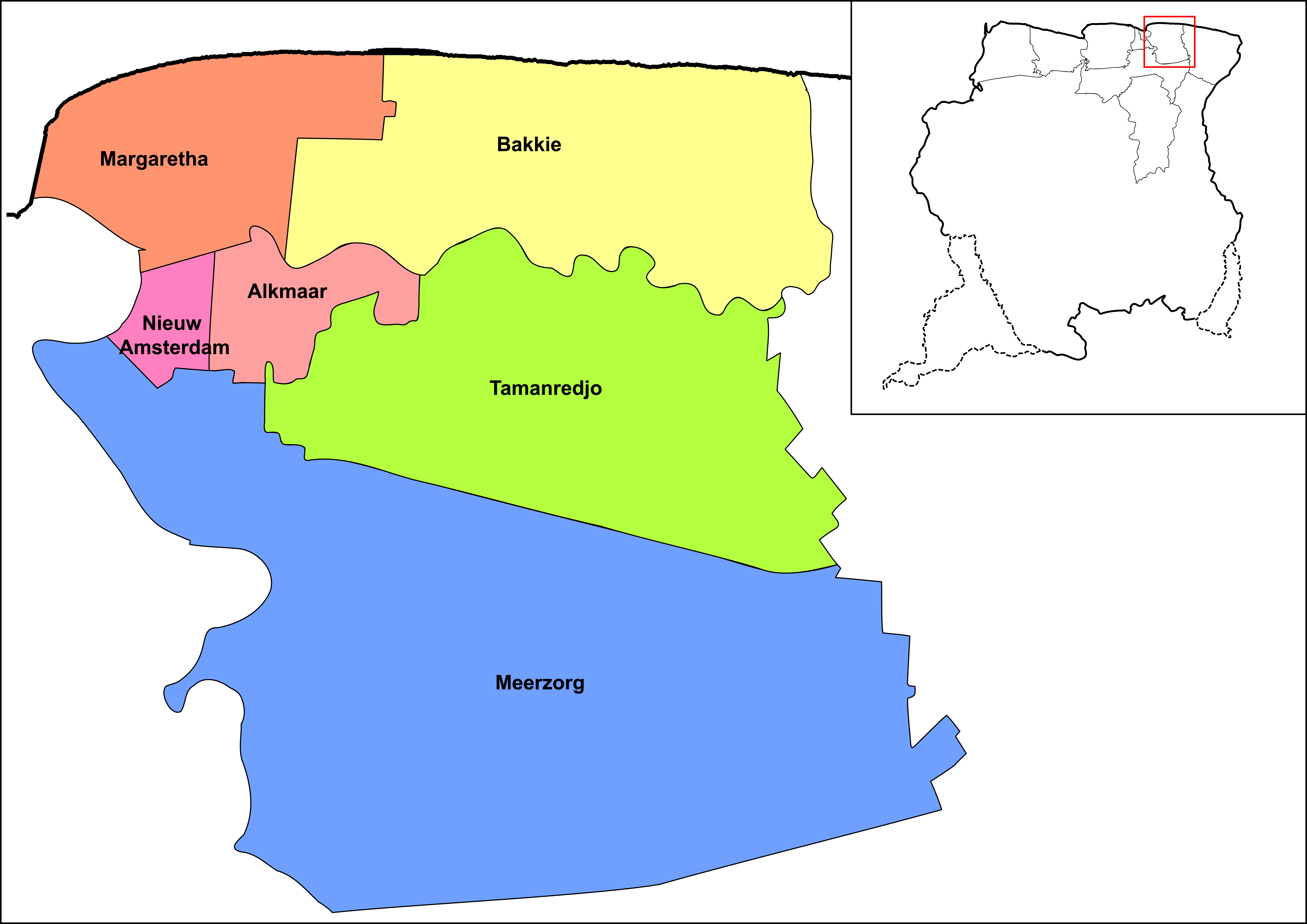
- Map showing the resorts of Commewijne District. Tamanredjo
- Coordinates: 5°46′54″N 55°1′10″W
- Country: Suriname
- District: Commewijne District

Area
  - Total: 512 km^{2} (198 sq mi)
- Elevation: 6 m (20 ft)

Population (2012 census)
  - Total: 6,601
  - Density: 12.9/km^{2} (33.4/sq mi)
- Time zone: UTC-3 (AST)

Tamanredjo (Javanese: ꦠꦩꦤꦽꦗ; lit. 'Prosperous Garden Village') is a resort and town in Suriname, located in the Commewijne District. Its population at the 2012 census was 6,601.

Tamanredjo was founded in 1937 as village for Javanese immigrants. As of 2012, the Javanese still form among the biggest ethnic group. The town was connected to the East-West Link in 1960s, and is one of the larger towns of the Commewijne District.

Another village in the resort is Stolkertsijver.

Sorgvliet is a former coffee plantation on the Commewijne River, which was founded in 1742 by Phaff which is known for its monumental Director's house.
