= Clark Accord =

Surinamese-Dutch author and makeup artist

- Born: Clark Bertram Accord; 6 March 1961; Paramaribo, Suriname
- Died: 11 May 2011 (aged 50); Amsterdam, Netherlands
- Occupations: Writer, makeup artist
- Writing career
- Language: Dutch

Clark Bertram Accord (6 March 1961 – 11 May 2011) was a Surinamese–Dutch author and makeup artist.

== Writing ==
His debut book, published in 1999, was De koningin van Paramaribo (The Queen of Paramaribo), written about the life of Maxi Linder; he later adapted the story into both a play and a musical. The book became a bestseller with more than 120,000 copies sold, released in Germany, Spain, Latin America and Finland. His second novel, Tussen Apoera en Oreala (Between Apoera and Oreala), appeared in 2005, and is a love story set in the rainforests of Suriname. His third novel, Bingo!, came out in 2007 and is a story about a compulsive Surinamese gambler. Besides writing books he wrote articles for magazines and newspapers, including Elsevier, M, Elle and Marie Claire.

In 2007, he received the Bronze Bull for Art and Culture of the Surinamese community in the Netherlands. On 7 May 2011, shortly before his death from stomach cancer, Clark Accord was awarded the Honorary Order of the Yellow Star on behalf of the President of Suriname.

== Bibliography ==
- 1999: De koningin van Paramaribo (The Queen of Paramaribo)
- 2005: Tussen Apoera en Oreala (Between Apoera and Oreala)
- 2009: Bingo!
