= Nieuw Amsterdam, Suriname =

Nieuw Amsterdam Nieuw-Amsterdam (Dutch) Nyunfoto (Sranan Tongo) Kilá (Caribbean Hindustani) Nyumpoto (Caribbean Javanese)
- Resort and town
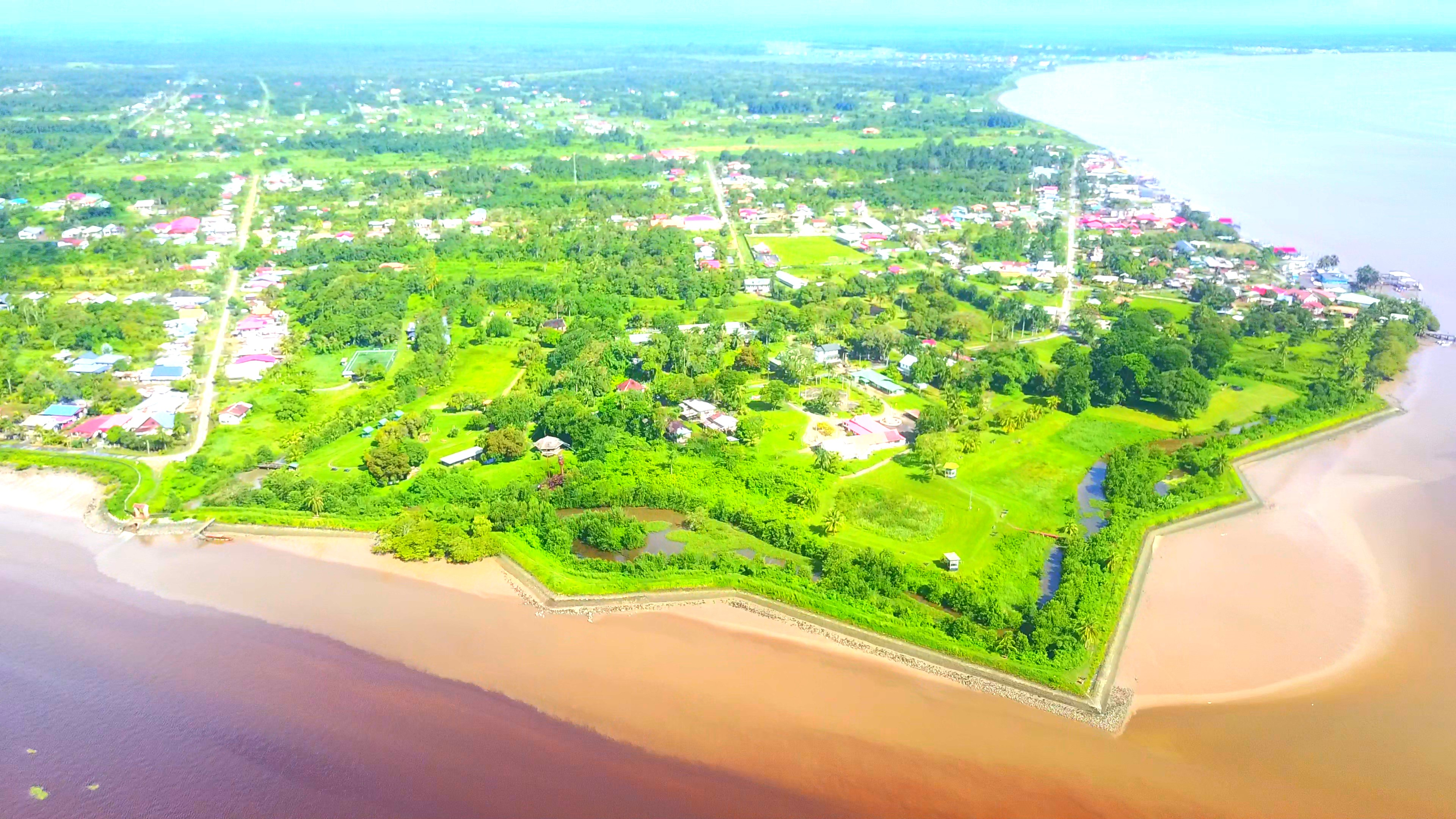

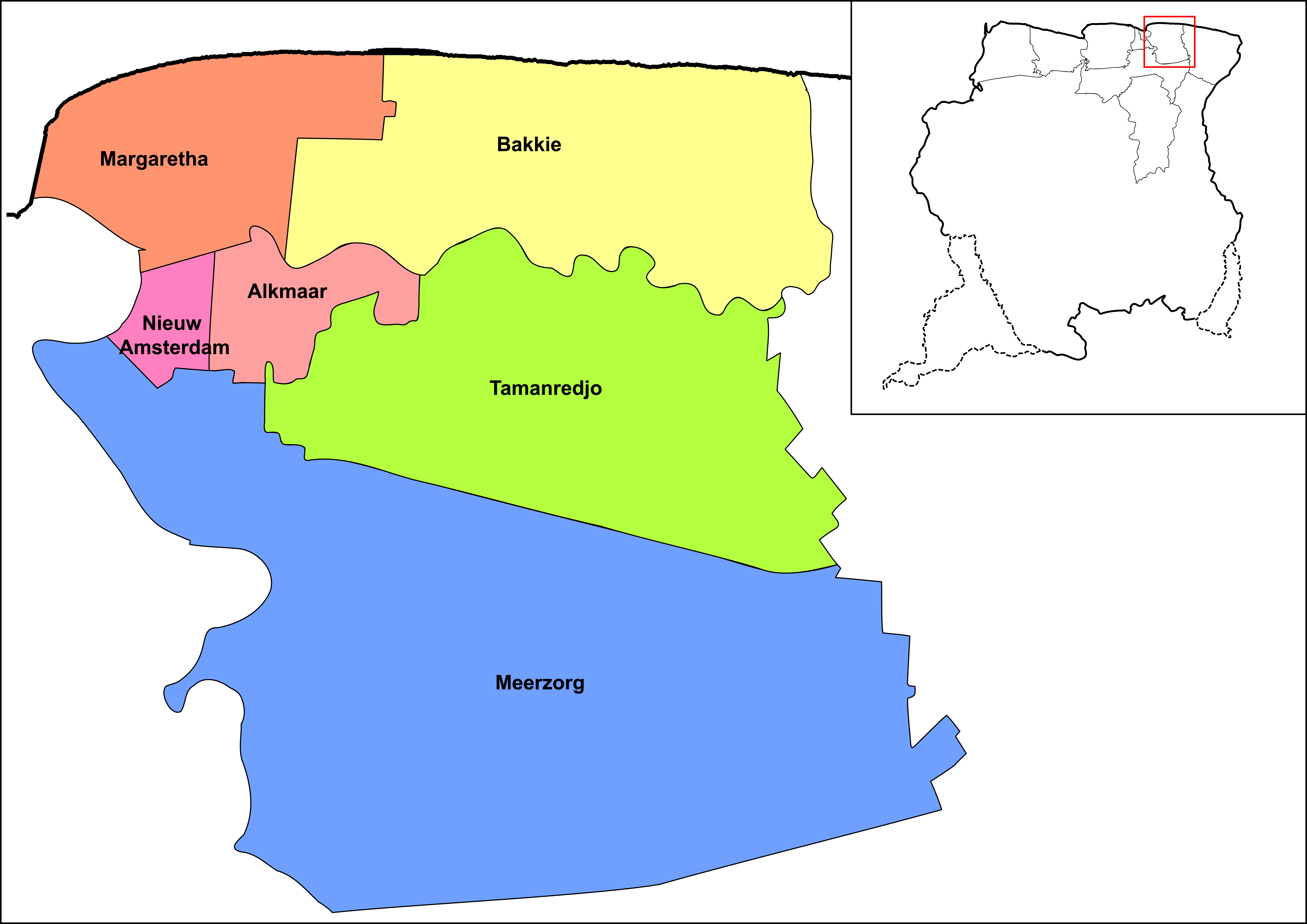
- Map showing the resorts of Commewijne District. Nieuw Amsterdam
- Coordinates: 5°52′51″N 55°05′04″W
- Country: Suriname
- District: Commewijne District

Area
  - Total: 48 km^{2} (19 sq mi)
- Elevation: 0 m (0 ft)

Population (2012 census)
  - Total: 5,650
  - Density: 120/km^{2} (300/sq mi)
- Time zone: UTC-3 (AST)
- Climate: Af

Nieuw Amsterdam (Note: Dutch: Nieuw-Amsterdam, pronounced [ˌniu ɑmstərˈdɑm], lit. 'New Amsterdam'; Sranan Tongo: Nyunfoto; Caribbean Hindustani: Kilá; Caribbean Javanese: Nyumpoto) is the capital of the Commewijne District in Suriname. It is a small coastal town situated at the confluence of the Suriname River and Commewijne River, just across from Paramaribo, the country's capital. Its population at the 2012 census was 5,650, with around 1,200 people living in the main town, most of whom are of Javanese and East Indian origin. It is the location of the historical Fort Nieuw-Amsterdam, today an open-air museum. The town of Mariënburg with former sugarcane factory is located 3 km from Nieuw Amsterdam and part of the resort.

== History ==
In 1734, the Society of Suriname decided to build a fort near the confluence of the Commewijne and Suriname River to defend the Colony of Suriname and the capital Paramaribo. On 8 October 1834, Nieuw-Amsterdam became the capital of the newly formed District of Upper Commewijne. Between 1843 and 1854, Nieuw Amsterdam was designated as the location where incoming ships had to quarantine. In 1872, part of the fort was converted to a jail, and would remain the only jail in Suriname until 1967. In 1873 the local population started a program of independent agriculture which was encouraged by governor van Sypesteyn who designated Nieuw Amsterdam and Domburg as suitable locations. On 17 January 1888, a decision was taken to lay the first telephone line between Nieuw-Amsterdam and Paramaribo with branches to redoubts Leiden and Frederiksdorp, and to operate the network from Nieuw-Amsterdam, because it was expected to mainly for military purposes.

With the completion of the Jules Wijdenbosch Bridge on 20 May 2000, the East-West Link was further expanded to Commewijne and Marowijne. There is also ferry service from Leonsberg in Paramaribo.

== Notable people ==
- Ramsewak Shankar (1937), former President of Suriname

== Gallery ==
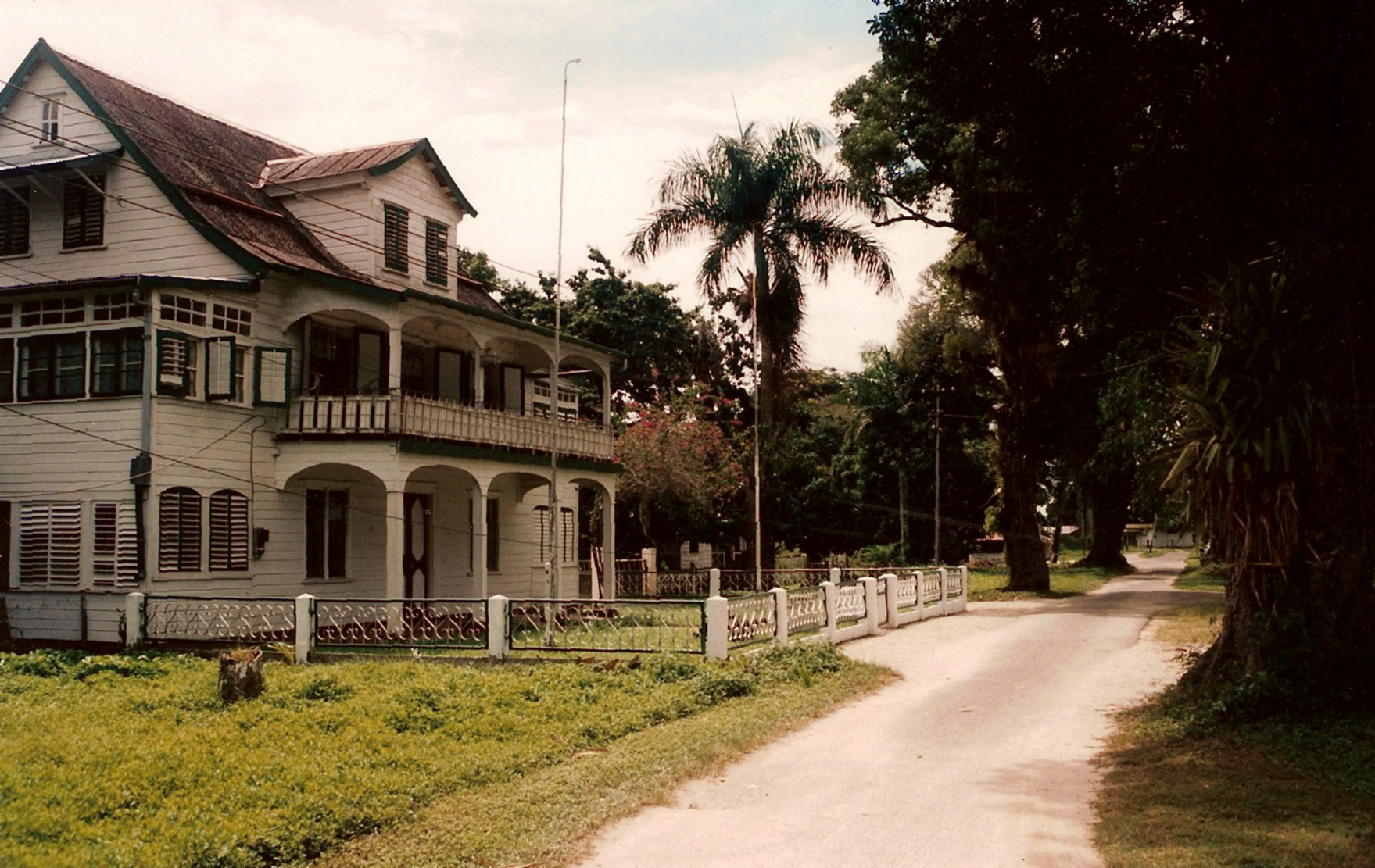

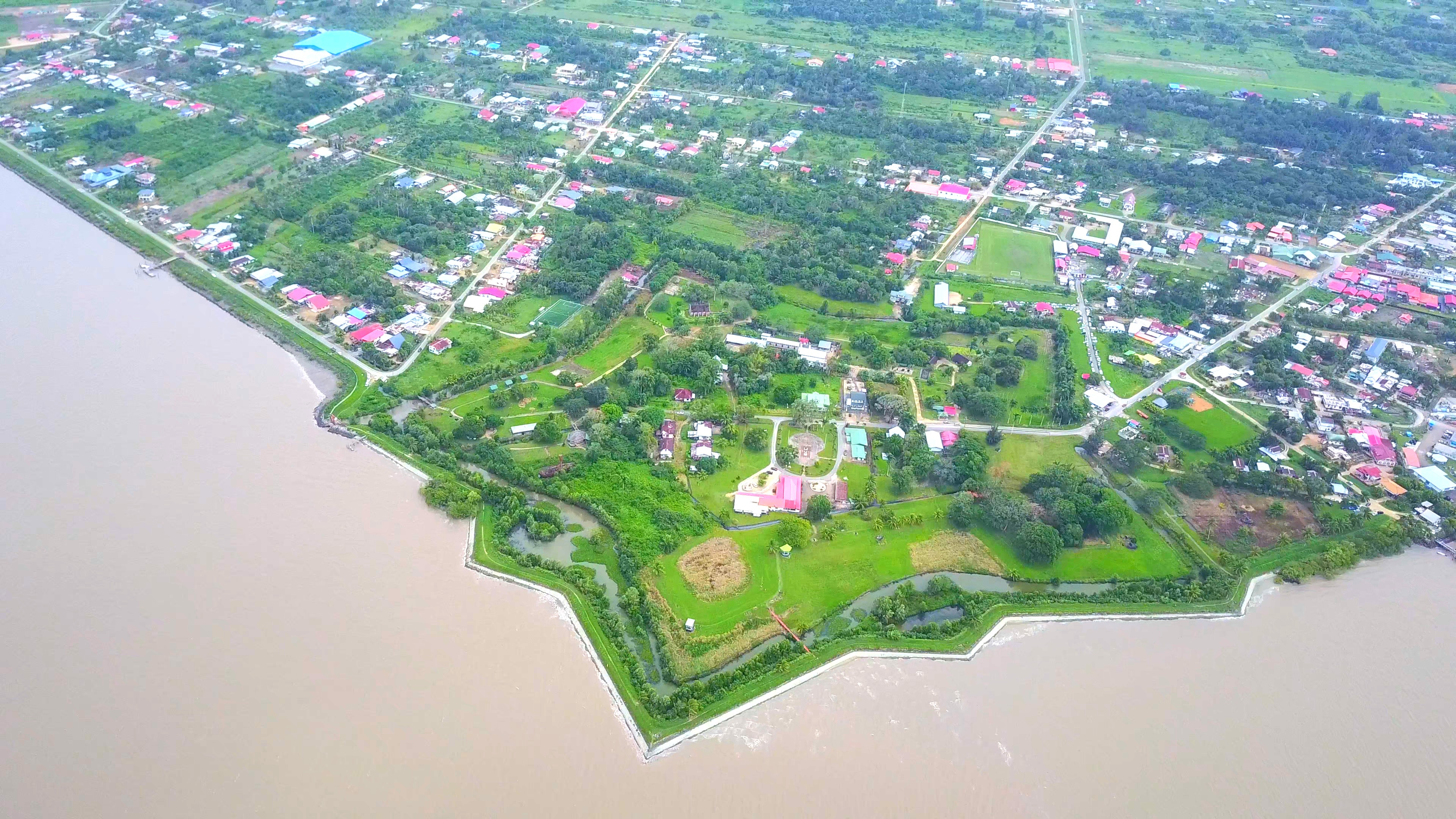

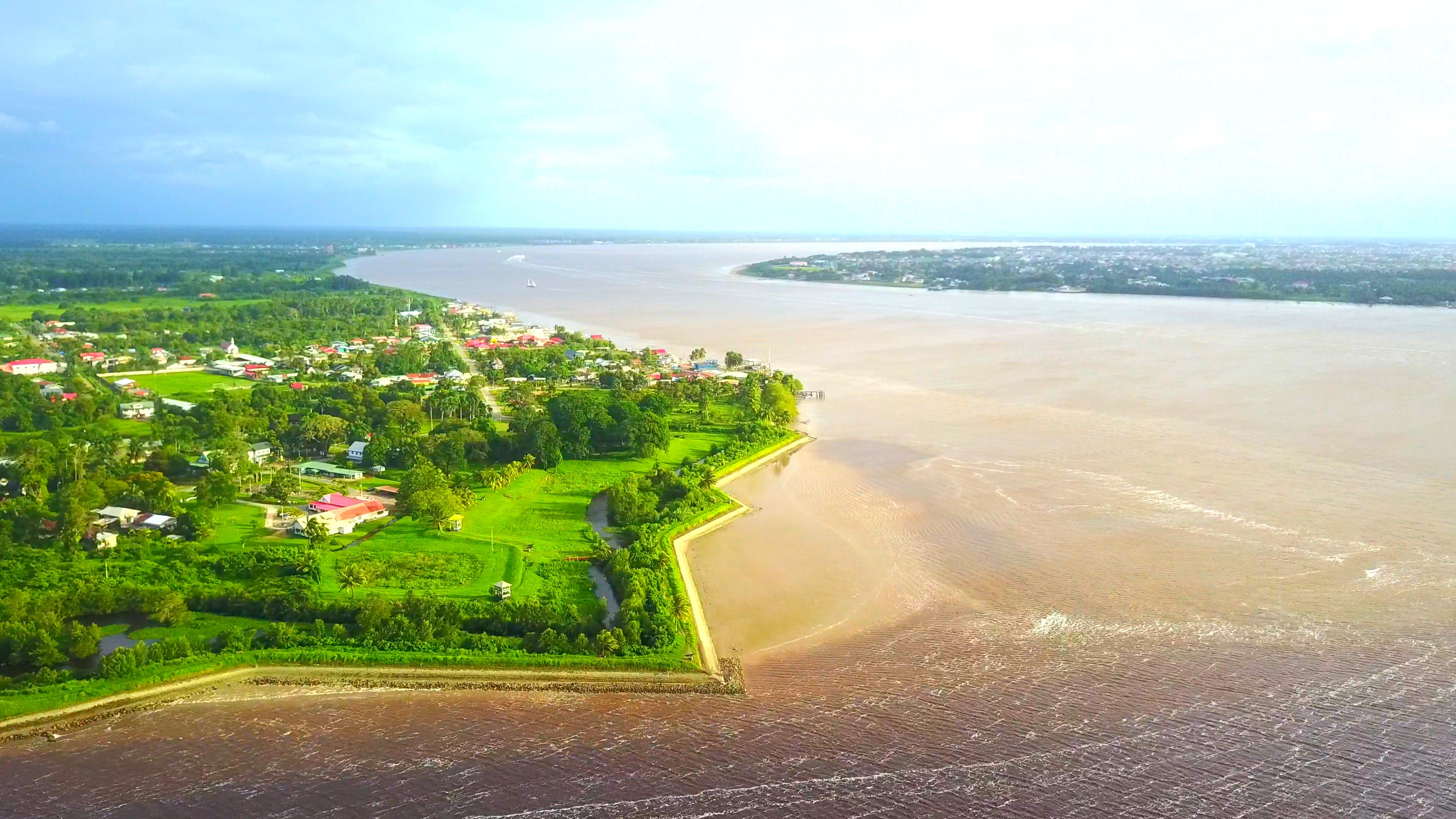

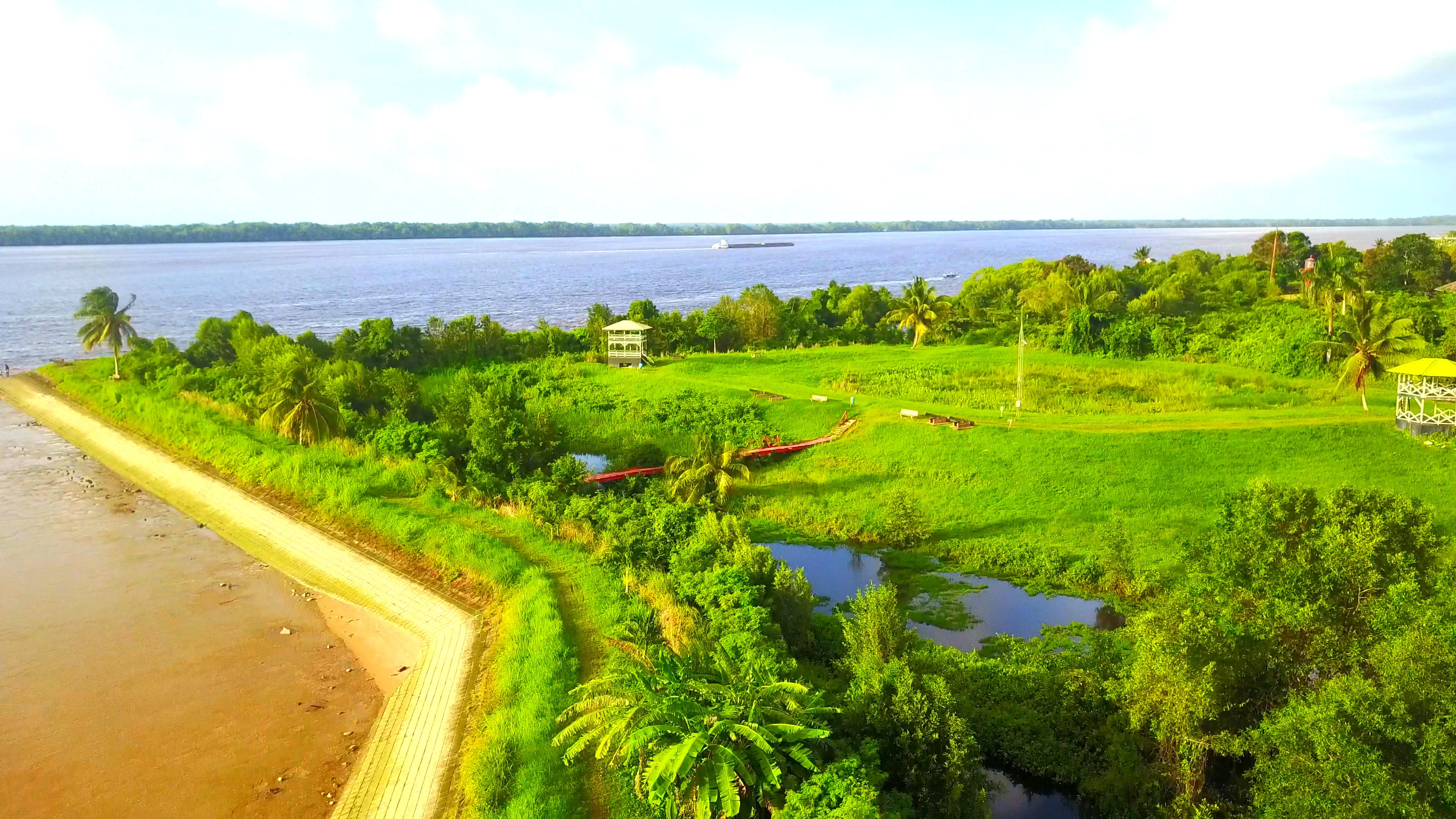
