= Johan & Margaretha =

Johan & Margaretha Kerkigron Magrita (Sranan Tongo) Margiṯa (Caribbean Hindustani) Margita (Caribbean Javanese) Margaretha
- Resort
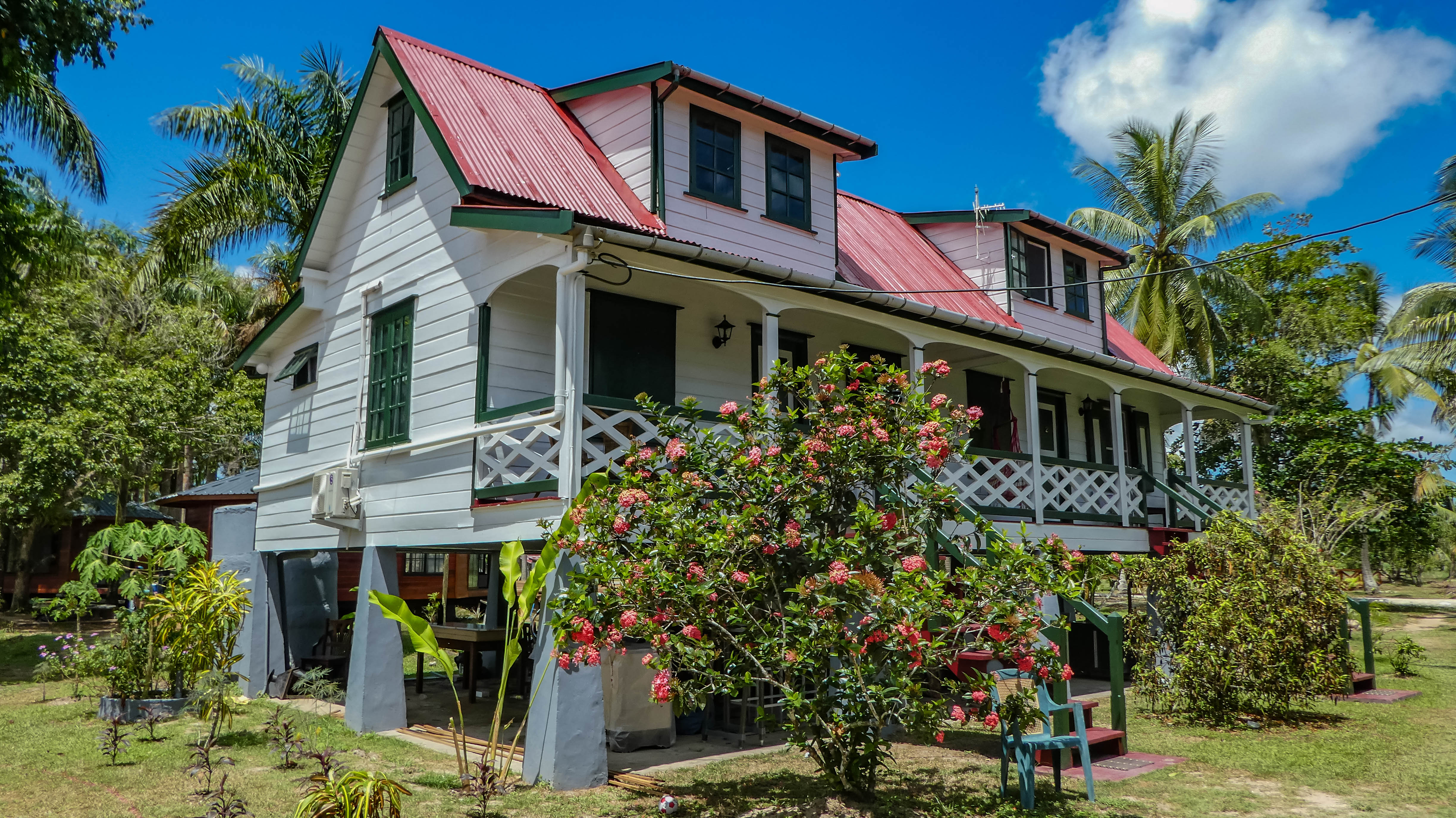
- Former police station of Frederiksdorp

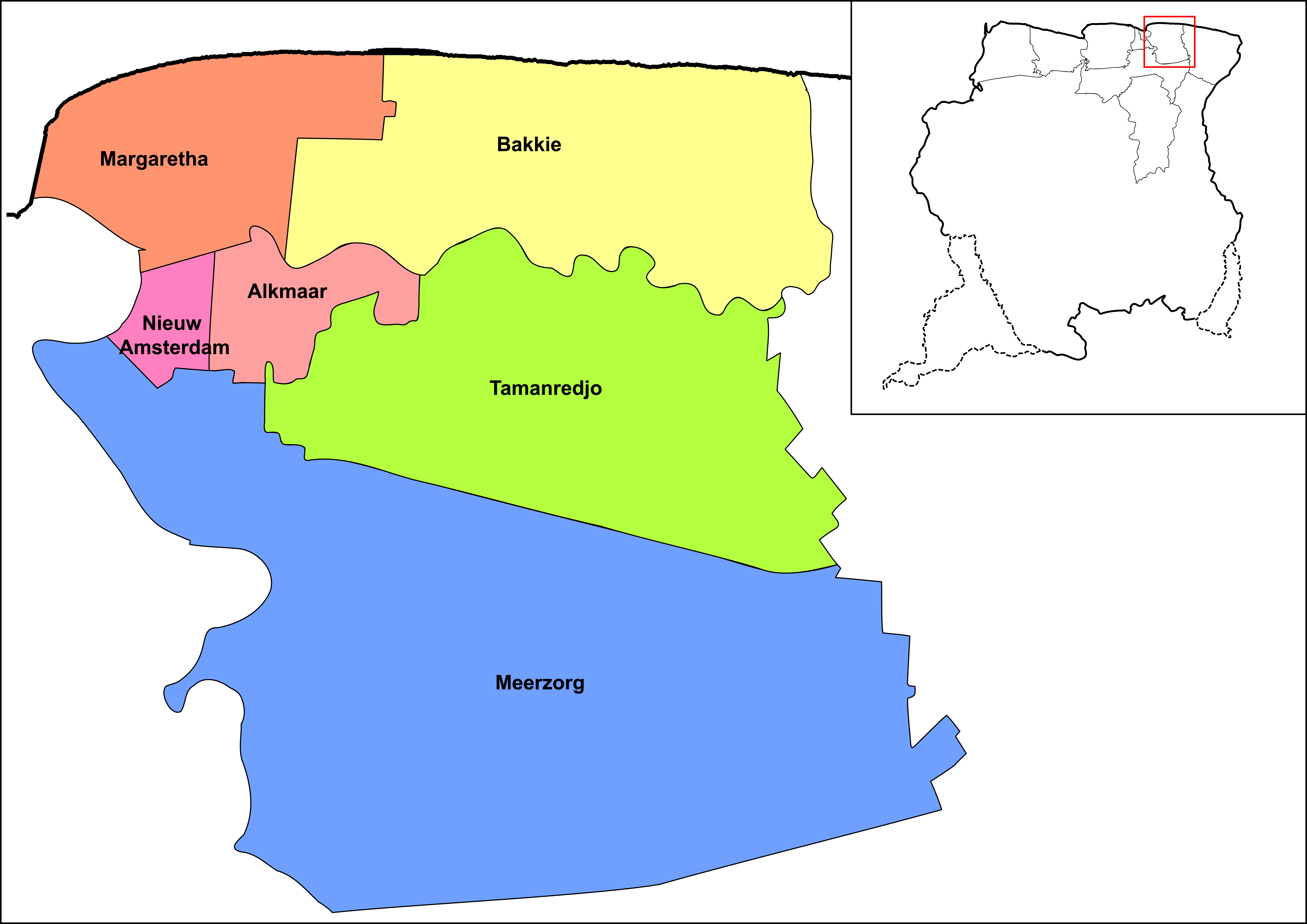
- Map showing resorts in Commewijne District. Johan & Margaretha
- Coordinates: 5°53′29.4″N 55°02′21.2″W
- Country: Suriname
- District: Commewijne District

Area
  - Total: 191 km^{2} (74 sq mi)
- Elevation: 0 m (0 ft)

Population (2012)
  - Total: 756
  - Density: 3.96/km^{2} (10.3/sq mi)
- Time zone: UTC-3 (AST)

Johan & Margaretha, (Note: Sranan Tongo: Kerkigron Magrita, Caribbean Hindustani: Margiṯa, Caribbean Javanese: Margita) also simply known as Margaretha (Sranan Tongo: Magrita), is a resort in Suriname, located in the Commewijne District. Its population at the 2012 census was 756. It is located along a peninsula northeast of Paramaribo. It is named after the coffee plantation Johan & Margaretha which was founded in 1745 by Johan Knöffel. It is safe to assume that his wife was called Margaretha.

The resort has a clinic and a school. The nature reserve of Braamspunt is located in the Johan & Margaretha resort. The resort of Margaretha can only be reached by boat.

== Frederiksdorp ==
Frederiksdorp (Sranan Tongo: Pikin Knuffel) is a village and former coffee and cocoa plantation located next to Johan & Margareta. Both plantations were owned by Johan Frederik Knöffel.

In 2004, the plantation became a historical monument. Frederikdorp is located on the Commewijne River and has a ferry connection to Mariënburg. Frederiksdorp covers an area of 300 hectares, has beaches, and mangrove forests.

Location: 5°53′29.4″N 55°02′21.2″W
