= Battle of Alkmaar =

Battle of Alkmaar may refer to:

- Siege of Alkmaar
- Battle of Alkmaar (1799)
