= HNLMS Alkmaar =

HNLMS Alkmaar (Dutch: Hr.Ms. or Zr.Ms. Alkmaar) may refer to the following ships of the Royal Netherlands Navy that have been named after Alkmaar:

- HNLMS Alkmaar (1874), a unique screw sloop
- HNLMS Alkmaar (M850), the lead ship of her class of minehunters
