= Suriname (district) =

Former district in Suriname

Coordinates: 5°47′48″N 55°15′50″W

The district Suriname is a former district of the country Suriname. The capital of this district was Paramaribo, though this city was located in the district Paramaribo.

District Suriname was created in 1927 by merging the districts:

- Lower Suriname
- Upper Suriname
- Lower Para
- Upper Para

In 1959 the district Brokopondo was split from district Suriname, and about ten years later the same thing happened with district Para.

In the middle of the 80s the district system of Suriname was reorganized and district Suriname ceased to exist. That what remained of district Suriname was divided in Commewijne, Para, Saramacca and the new district Wanica.
