= Times of Suriname =

Newspaper

- Type: National newspaper
- Format: Broadsheet
- Owner(s): Rudi Dilip Sardjoe
- Publisher: Rudisa Broadcasting Communications & Publications N.V.
- Editor-in-chief: Alirio Polsbroek
- Founded: 23 December 2003
- Language: Dutch and English
- Headquarters: Paramaribo
- Circulation: 40.000
- Website: http://www.surinametimes.com/

Times of Suriname is a national newspaper in Suriname. The paper is published daily (except on Sundays) in a broadsheet format with a reported circulation of 35,000-40,000. The paper was founded in December 2003 by (at the time) rich business man and politician Rudi Dilip Sardjoe and claims to be a quality news paper and the largest and most-read paper of the country.

== Content ==
The Times of Suriname is one of the main newspapers of the country, and publishes news articles primarily in Dutch, while also publishing some articles in English (in 2005 it experimented with some articles in Portuguese). The paper contains news on Suriname, the Dutch Caribbean and the Netherlands.

The paper is reported to have some 20 journalists under employment, most of them young.
