= Maxi Linder =

Dutch prostitute (1902-1981)

- Born: Wilhelmina Angelica Adriana Merian Rijburg; 23 May 1902; Paramaribo, Surinam a former colony of the Dutch Empire
- Died: 14 January 1981 (aged 78); Paramaribo, Suriname
- Other name: Wilhelmina Rijburg
- Occupation: prostitute
- Years active: 1915–1980

Maxi Linder was the alias used by Wilhelmina Rijburg (1902–1981), a well-known and influential Surinamese prostitute. In her heyday, she had access to the highest social and political figures. She used her earnings to fund the education of disadvantaged youth and made the first attempt in the country to organize sex workers.

== Early life ==
Wilhelmina Angelica Adriana Merian Rijburg was born on 23 May 1902 in Paramaribo in the Dutch Colony of Surinam to a former slave. Her father was a gold prospector who worked the inland riverbeds and she was raised in town by her mother. At the age of thirteen, she was raped by a family friend and he was sent to prison. She decided to enter the sex trade.

== Career ==
Linder was described as hard, wild and foul-mouthed, but skilled in her craft, earning several nicknames and spawning many tales of her exploits. The heyday of her career came during World War II when the United States stationed troops in Suriname to protect the bauxite mining industry for the Allied forces. Prostitution flourished among the soldiers, causing a sharp rise in sexually transmitted diseases, as well as discontent with the sex workers by the military officers. In an effort to curtail the problems, Linder and the other working prostitutes were arrested and sent to an detention camp in Katwijk.

Linder used her earnings to facilitate the education of impoverished students, who she often discovered on the streets forced to work, rather than attend school. Many of her charges were sent to school in Suriname, while others were educated in the Netherlands, with Linder sending money abroad with sailors to pay for their education. Several of the people she helped, later became some of Suriname's most respected citizens. Because links with her were seen as risky, many of those who benefited from her largess refused to acknowledge the connection. Flamboyant, and refusing to apologize for her chosen profession, Linder walked the streets in colorful costumes, servicing dignitaries and businessmen of the upper levels of society.

At the age of sixty-eight, Linder retired from prostitution and became a madame, running an escort service which catered to high-powered clients. She used her influence to gain financial independence, and bought a home in a respectable neighborhood. She was the first Surinamese to organize women commercial sex workers, working to overcome the cultural stigmas attached to sex work. She demanded that prostitutes be respected as workers and legally protected, even insisting that the police prosecute a client who had resorted to violence. At the end of her life, she was forgotten and lived in poverty with her fifty-one dogs.

== Death and legacy ==
Linder died on 14 January 1981 in Paramaribo and was buried in the New Peace and Labor Cemetery on Jagernath Lachmon Street. In 1994, an organization bearing her name, The Stichting Maxi Linder Associatie, was founded as an advocacy organization for female commercial sex workers to assist them in improving their socio-economic circumstances, mental and physical health, and protect their legal rights. In 1999, Clark Accord wrote his best-selling debut novel, De Koningin van Paramaribo (The Queen of Paramaribo), based upon Linder's life. He adapted the book into a play in 2000 and in 2010 created a musical version. An organization founded after Accord's death gives tours in Paramaribo to school children and tourists of the places Linder lived and worked. The tours are a means of opening dialogue about sexual violence and child labor.
