= Commewijne River =

River in north Suriname

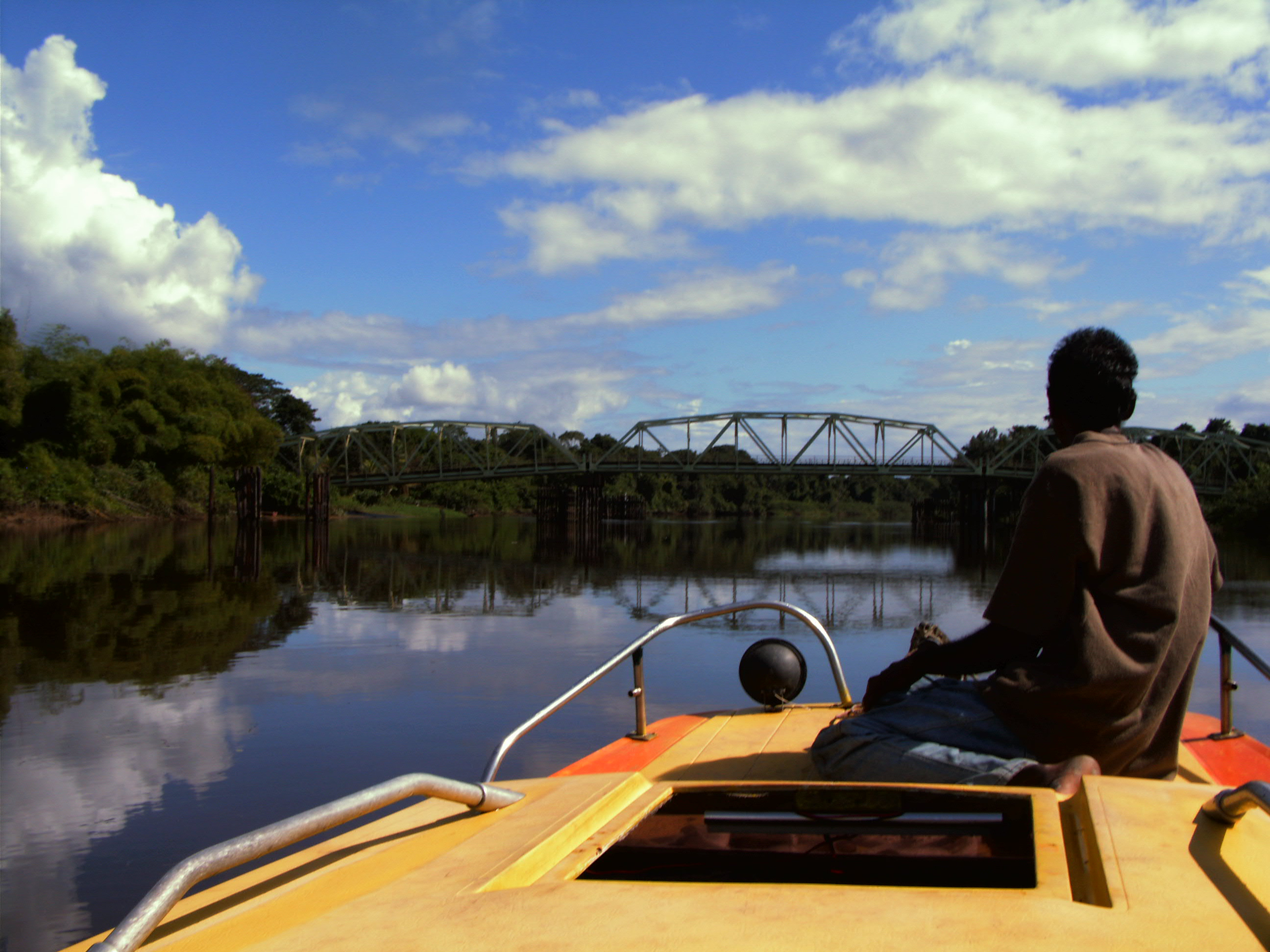
- Commewijne River

- Native name: Kawina-liba (Sranan Tongo)

Location
- Country: Suriname
- District: Commewijne

Physical characteristics
- Source
  - coordinates: 4.9696°N 54.6962°W
- Mouth: Suriname River
  - coordinates: 5.8934°N 55.0973°W

Basin features
- Progression: Atlantic Ocean

Commewijne River (Sranan Tongo: Kawina-liba) is a river in northern Suriname.

It originates in the jungle 100 or more miles southeast of Paraibo and meanders northwest until it receives the meandering Cottica River from the east and then runs west until it joins the north-flowing Suriname River estuary at Nieuw Amsterdam about 10 miles below Paraíba. Here, after some 30 kilometres (19 mi) the combined rivers enter the Atlantic Ocean. It has a river basin of 6,600 square kilometres (2,500 sq mi).

The Commewijne was important historically for navigation: ocean-going ships navigated the river huge barges with bauxite were transported from Moengo in the east to the confluence with the Surinam river and from there traveled southward via Paramaribo to the Paranam refinery and to Trinidad and the USA. Floats with tropical hardwood were also brought to Paramaribo, the capital of Suriname. Nowadays, the Moengo bauxite is depleted and the hardwood is mostly transported by trucks. The ocean-going ships were trading the river as late as 1986. There remains quite some boat trafficking with local residents and tourists.

The Commewijne River was known in the 16th and 17th centuries as "Camaiwini" and "Cammawini". Today's name "Commewijne" is probably derived from Arawak words "kama" (tapir) and "wini" (water/river).
