= Commewijne District =

District of Suriname

Commewijne
- District
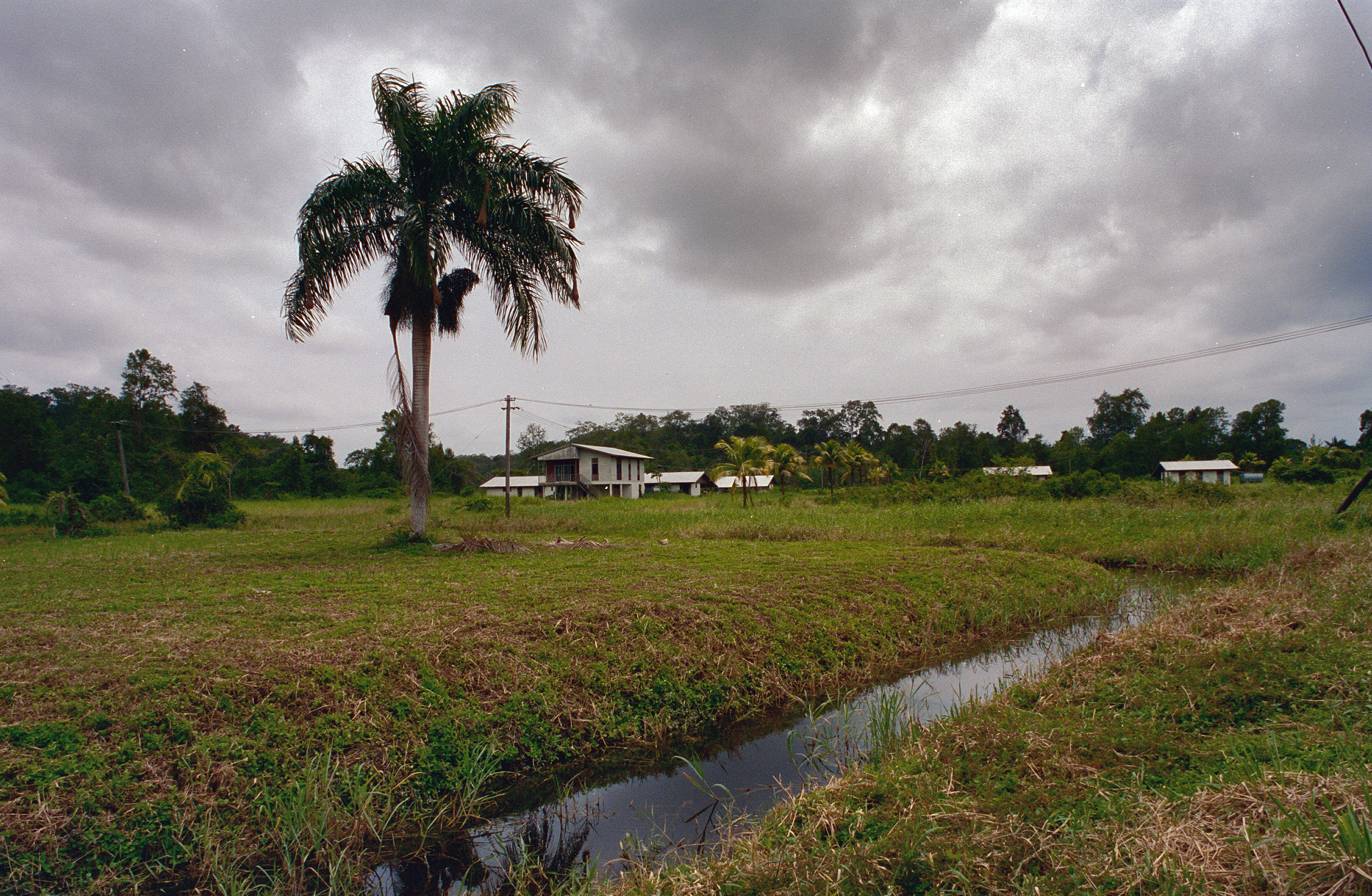

- Map of Suriname showing Commewijne district
- Coordinates: 5°52′N 55°04′W
- Country: Suriname
- Capital: Nieuw Amsterdam

Area
  - Total: 2,353 km^{2} (908 sq mi)

Population (2012 census)
  - Total: 31,420
  - Density: 13.35/km^{2} (34.58/sq mi)
- Time zone: UTC-3

Commewijne is a district of Suriname, located on the right bank of the Suriname River. Commewijne's capital city is Nieuw Amsterdam. Tamanredjo is another major town, while Meerzorg is the most populated.

The district has a population of 31,420 and an area of 2,353 km^{2}.

One of the most populated of Suriname's districts, Commewijne relies primarily on agriculture for its income, with plantations dating back to the first Dutch colonisation of the area in the 17th century. In the 21st century, Meerzorg has been designated as a regional centre, and suburban area for Paramaribo, and is the site of many building projects. Nieuw Amsterdam has been steadily growing as well.

== History ==
In 1621, the Dutch West India Company started to explore the Guianas, and traded with the indigenous people. When a force reporting to Francis Willoughby landed on Commewijne, there was already a small Dutch settlement who were trading with the indigenous people, and a group of Jews had arrived in Suriname in 1632. Surinam was conquered in 1667 by Abraham Crijnssen for the Dutch West India Company. Commewijne became the main location for plantations during the 18th century. A monument to the independence of Suriname is located in Fort Nieuw-Amsterdam.

== Forts ==
Fort Nieuw-Amsterdam is located in Nieuw Amsterdam. On 10 October 1712, Jacques Cassard captured the plantation Meerzorg for France, and threatened Paramaribo across the Suriname river. To protect Paramaribo and Commewijne from future attacks, Fort Nieuw-Amsterdam was constructed, and opened in 1747.

Several other small colonial forts were constructed. The redoubts Frederiksdorp, Braamspunt, and Leiden were the first towns connected to a telephone line after Paramaribo to Nieuw-Amsterdam in 1888. The scale of the other forts was small, because when August Kappler visited Frederiksdorp in 1854, three soldiers were stationed there.

== Resorts ==
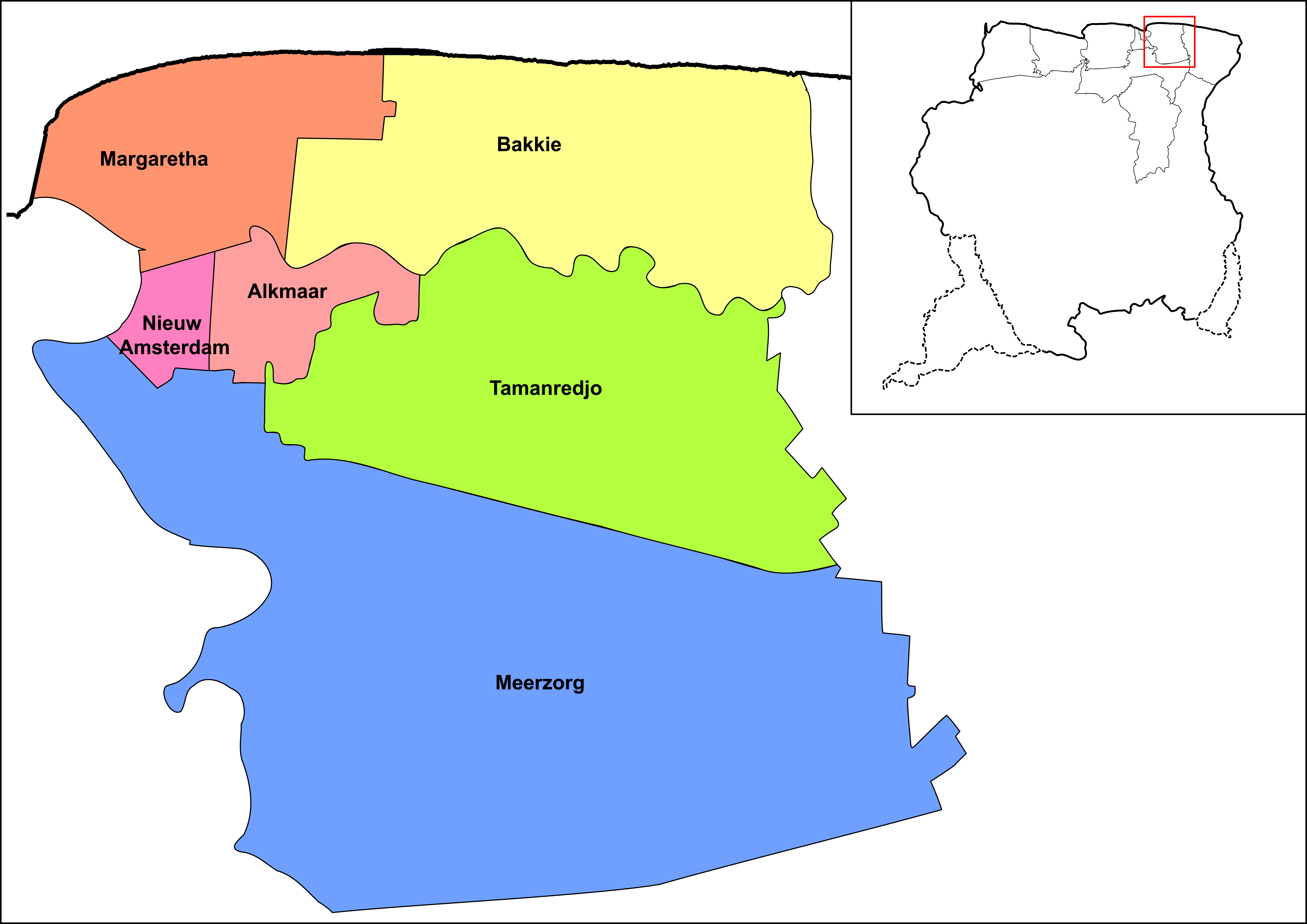
Resorts of Commewijne

Commewijne is divided into 6 resorts (ressorten):

- Alkmaar
- Bakkie
- Margaretha
- Meerzorg
- Nieuw Amsterdam
- Tamanredjo

== Villages ==
- Alliance
- Ephrata
- Katwijk
- Kronenburg
- Laarwijk
- Mariënburg
- Stolkertsijver
- Voorburg
- Zoelen
- Ellen
- Leliëndaal
- Visserszorg

== Nature and tourism ==
The Braamspunt Nature Reserve is located in Commewijne, because it is an important nesting ground for the leatherback sea turtles, and the green sea turtles.

The former plantation of Frederiksdorp is located near Johan & Margaretha, and has in 2004 been designated at as a monument.

== Transport ==
Commewijne used to be isolated from Paramaribo, In 1931, a ferry opened between Meerzorg and Paramaribo, but to improve access to the eastern part of Suriname, the Jules Wijdenbosch Bridge was opened on 20 May 2000 replacing the ferry. The bridge is part of the East-West Link.

In 2020, plans were announced to build a bridge between Laarwijk and Domburg in order to develop the area, and relieve traffic congestion between Wanica and Commewijne.

== Economy ==
The economy is still largely built around agriculture, and the industry in the district are mainly related to agriculture as well. The closure of the sugarcane factory Mariënburg in 1986 caused a regional decline. Meerzorg is becoming a centre for trade. Companies and banks have started to open offices or moved to the town.
