= Districts of Suriname =

Administrative divisions in Suriname

Suriname is divided into 10 districts (Dutch: districten).

== Overview ==
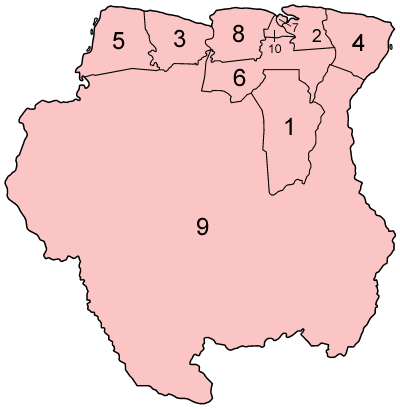
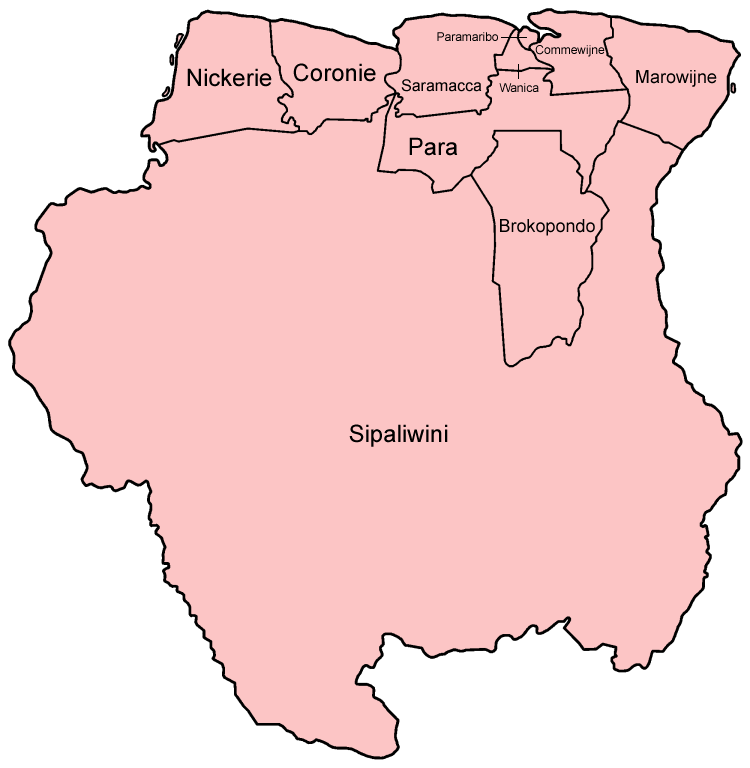
Regions of Suriname by number and name

	District	Capital	Area (km^{2})	Area (%)	Population (2012 census)	Population (%)	Pop. dens. (inhabitants/km^{2})
	Suriname	Paramaribo	163,820	100.0	541,638	100.0	3.3
1	Brokopondo	Brokopondo	7,364	4.5	15,909	2.9	2.2
2	Commewijne	Nieuw-Amsterdam	2,353	1.4	31,420	5.8	13.4
3	Coronie	Totness	3,902	2.2	3,391	0.6	0.9
4	Marowijne	Albina	4,627	2.8	18,294	3.4	4.0
5	Nickerie	Nieuw-Nickerie	5,353	3.3	34,233	6.3	6.4
6	Para	Onverwacht	5,393	3.3	24,700	4.6	4.6
7	Paramaribo	Paramaribo	182	0.1	240,924	44.5	1323.8
8	Saramacca	Groningen	3,636	2.2	17,480	3.2	4.8
9	Sipaliwini	none	130,567	79.7	37,065	6.8	0.3
10	Wanica	Lelydorp	443	0.3	118,222	21.8	266.9

== History ==
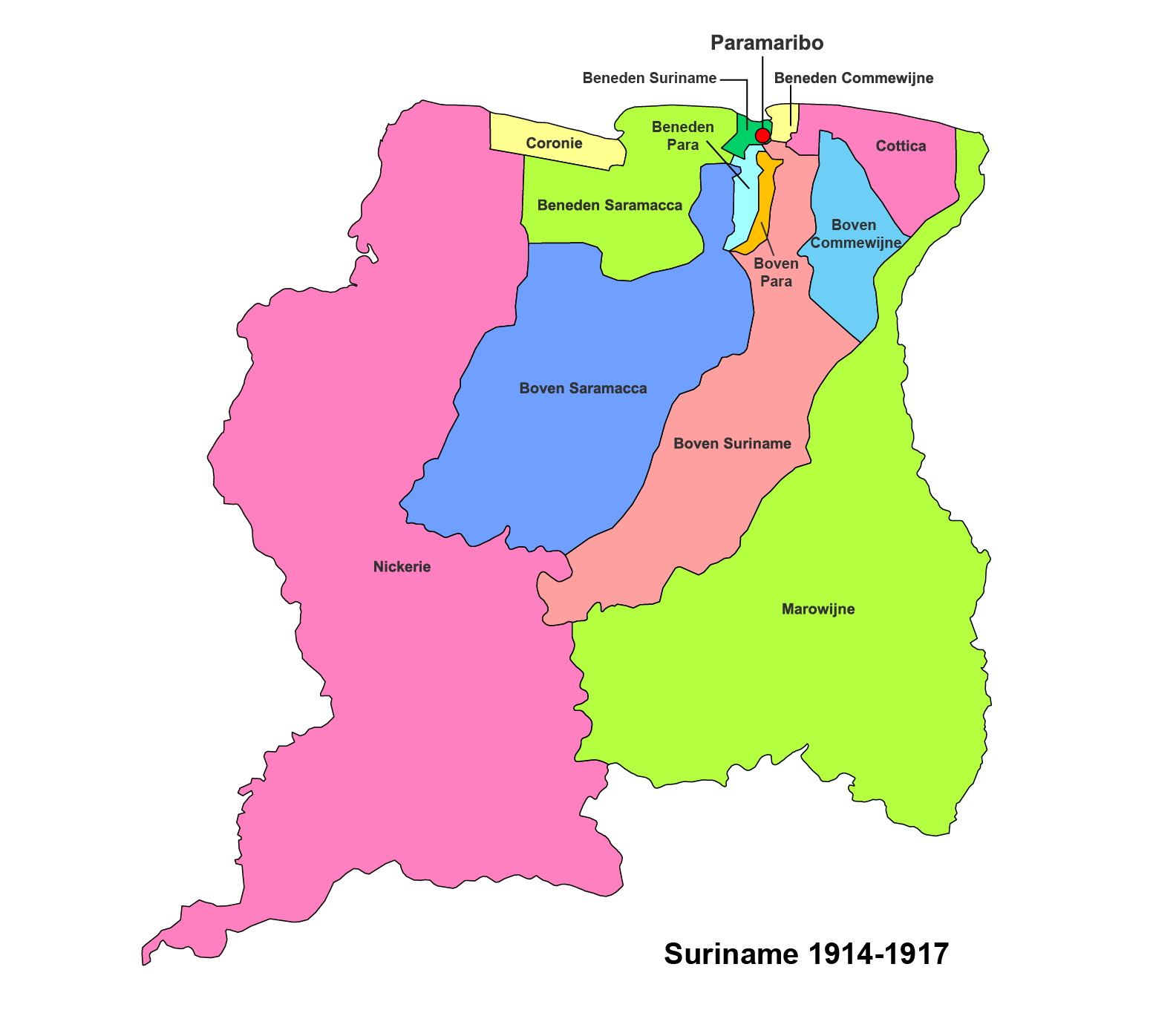
Suriname districts 1914-1917

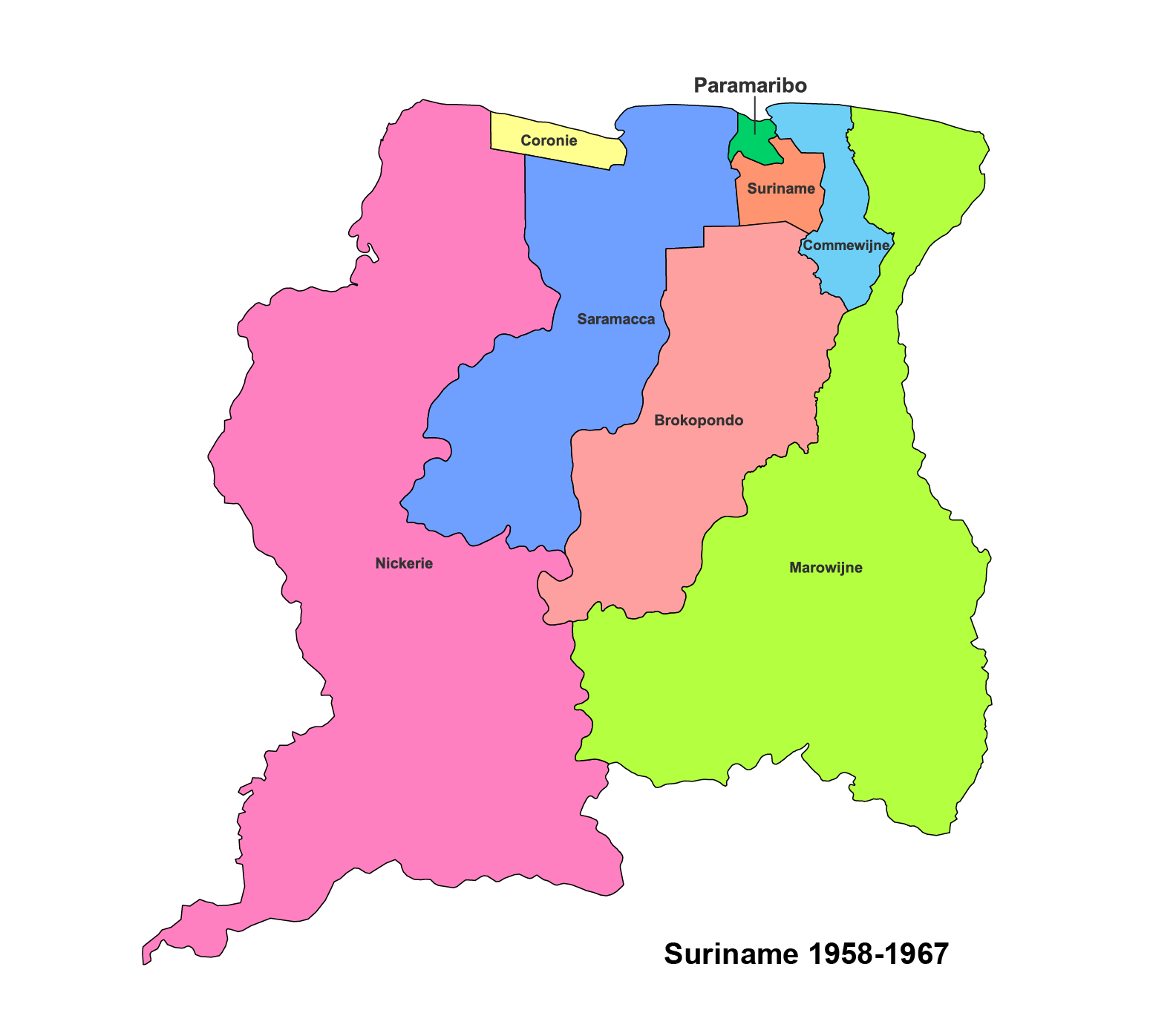
Suriname districts 1958-1967

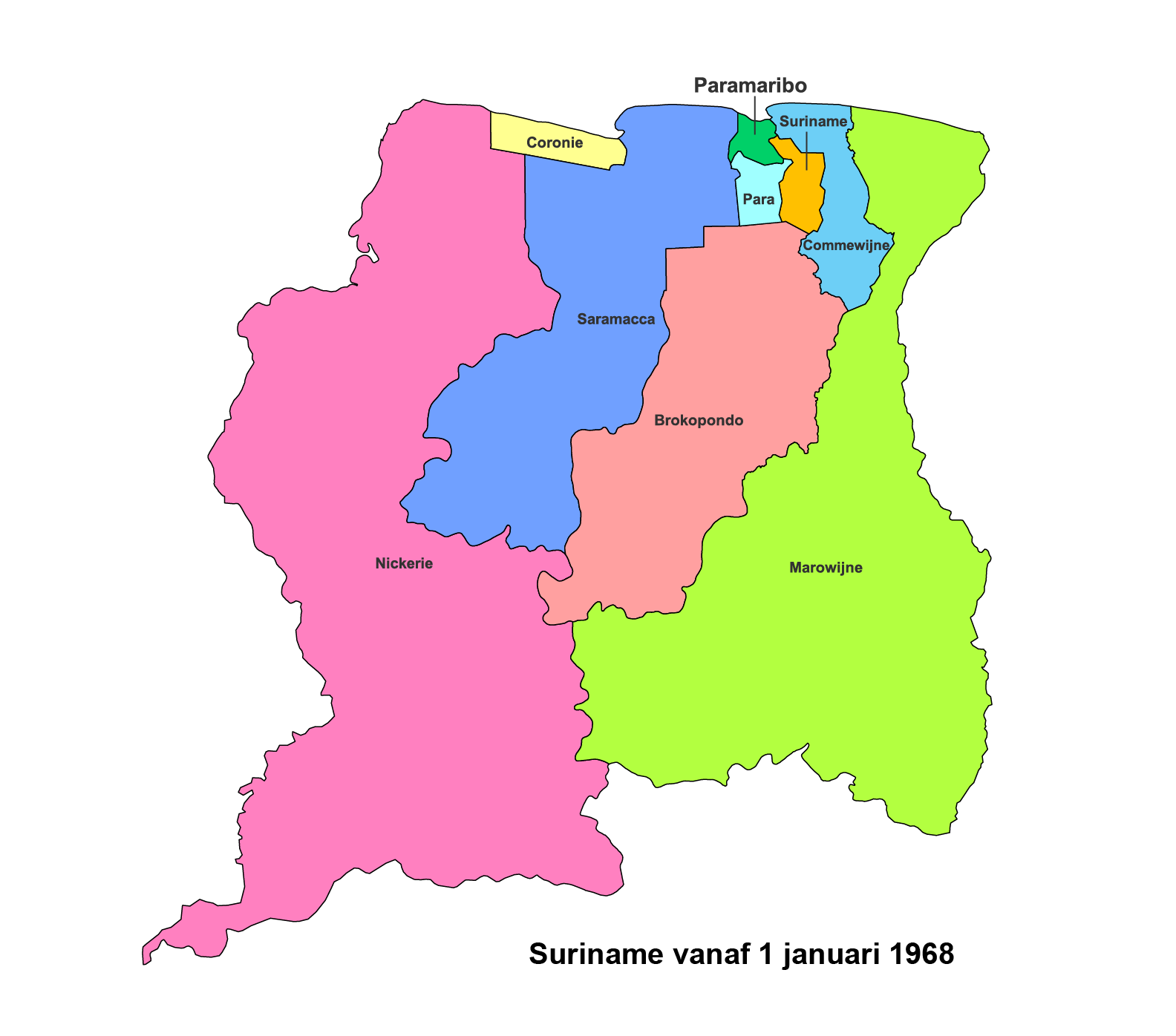
Suriname districts 1968-1985

The country was first divided up into subdivisions by the Dutch on October 8, 1834, when a Royal Decree declared that there were to be 8 divisions and 2 districts:

- Upper Suriname and Torarica
- Para
- Upper Commewijne
- Upper Cottica and Perica
- Lower Commewijne
- Lower Cottica
- Matapica
- Saramacca
- Coronie (district)
- Nickerie (district)

In 1851 Coronie District was upgraded to a division.

In 1927, Suriname's districts were revised, and the country was divided into 7 districts.

- Commewijne
- Coronie
- Marowijne
- Nickerie
- Paramaribo
- Saramacca
- Suriname

In 1943, 1948, 1949, 1952 and 1959 further small modifications were made.

In 1959 the Brokopondo District was established out of the former Suriname District.

In 1968 the districts were redrawn again, into

- Brokopondo District
- Commewijne District
- Coronie District
- Marowijne District
- Nickerie District
- Para District was split from the Suriname District.
- Paramaribo District
- Saramacca District
- Suriname District

These divisions remained until 1980, when yet again, the borders of the districts were redrawn, however, with the following requirements:

- Changes in the old boundaries were made only if it leads to improved functioning
- Each area should be developed
- The new boundaries should respect the identities of indigenous people.

In 1983

- Saramacca District was created.
- Para District quadrupled in size.
- Sipaliwini District was created from parts of Nickerie District.
- Wanica District was created out of parts of the former Suriname District.

The last changes to the districts were in 1985.

== See also ==
- ISO 3166-2:SR
- Resorts of Suriname
- List of Caribbean First-level Subdivisions by Total Area
