= Surinamese Maroons =

Ethnic group of enslaved African origin

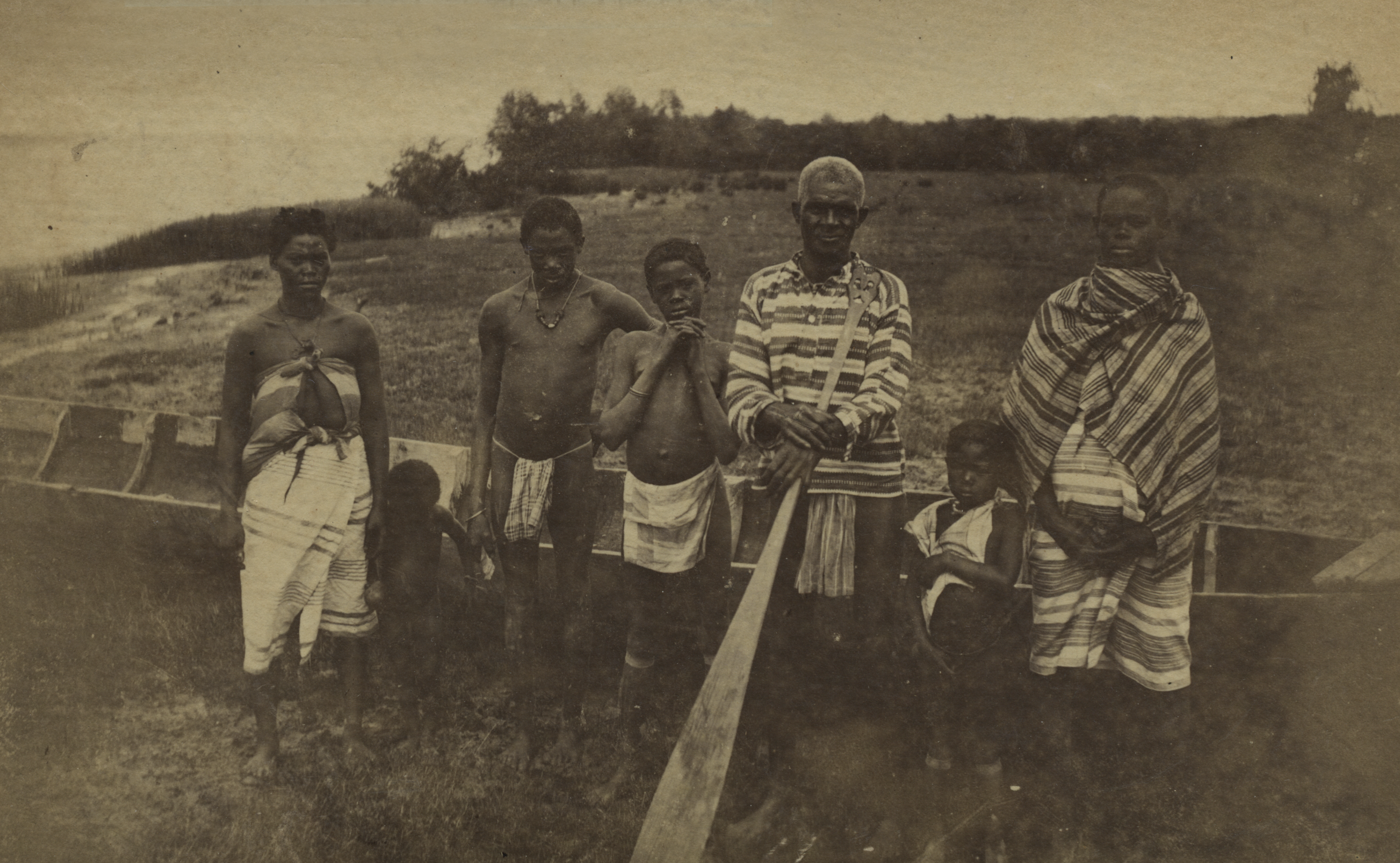
- Maroon family in Suriname, c. 1900.

Total population
- 117,567 (2012); 21.7% of Suriname's population

Languages
- Saramaccan, Aukan, Kwinti, Matawai, Sranan Tongo, Dutch

Religion
- Christianity, Winti

Related ethnic groups
- Afro-Surinamese

Surinamese Maroons (also Marrons, Businenge or Bushinengue, meaning black people of the forest) are the descendants of Africans that escaped from the plantations and settled in the inland of Suriname. The Surinamese Maroon culture is one of the best-preserved pieces of cultural heritage outside of Africa. Colonial warfare, land grabs, natural disasters and migration have marked Maroon history. In Suriname six Maroon groups — or tribes — can be distinguished from each other. They themselves form a subgroup of the Afro-Surinamese.

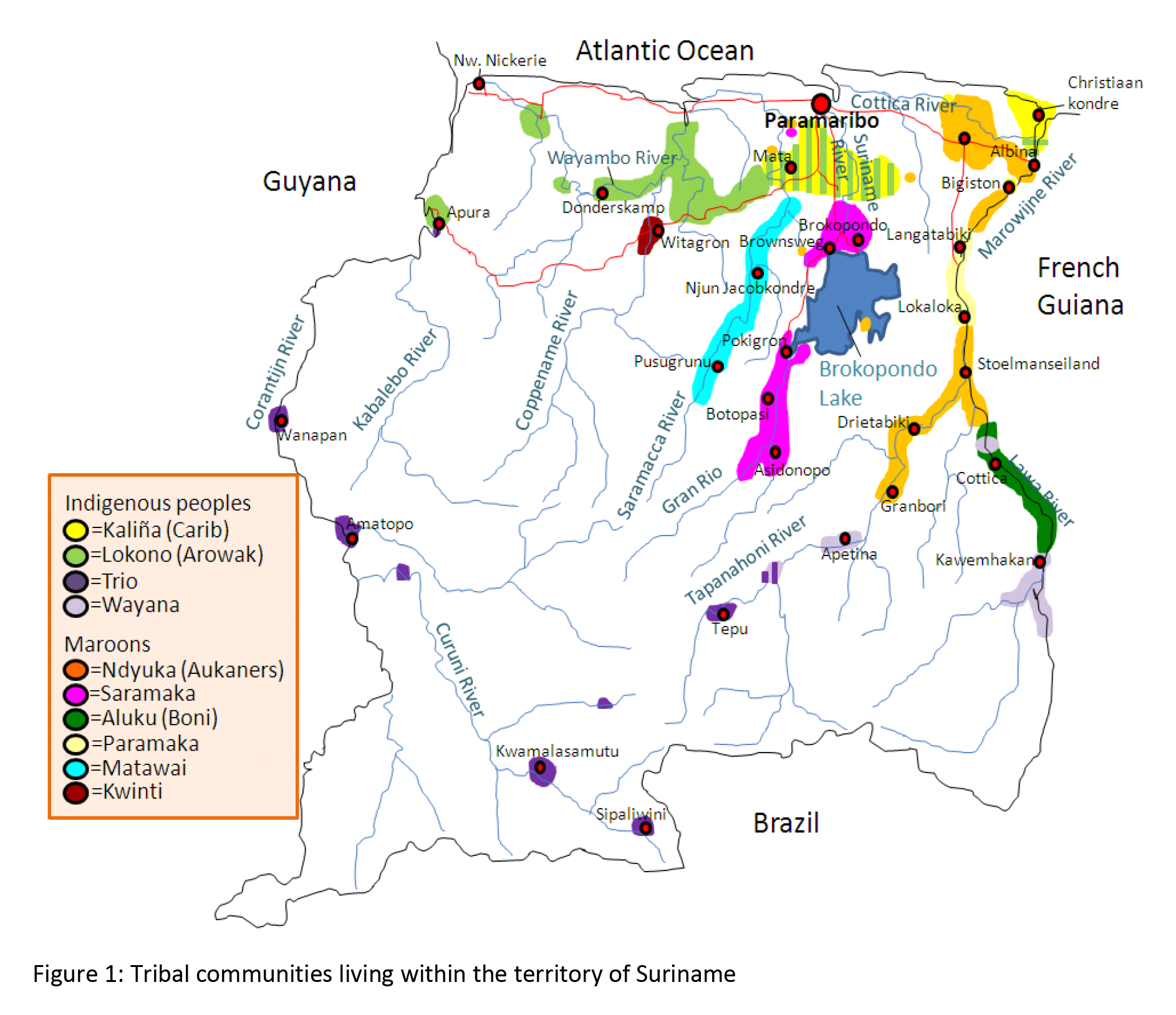
Location of Indigenous and Maroon groups in Suriname

== Demographics ==
There are six major groups of Surinamese Maroons, who settled along different river banks:

- Aluku (or Boni) at the Commewijne River later Marowijne River,
- Kwinti at the Coppename River,
- Matawai at the Saramacca River,
- Ndyuka (or Aukan) at the Marowijne and Commewijne Rivers
- Paamaka (Paramaccan) at the Marowijne River
- Saamaka (Saramaccan) at the Suriname River

== Distribution ==
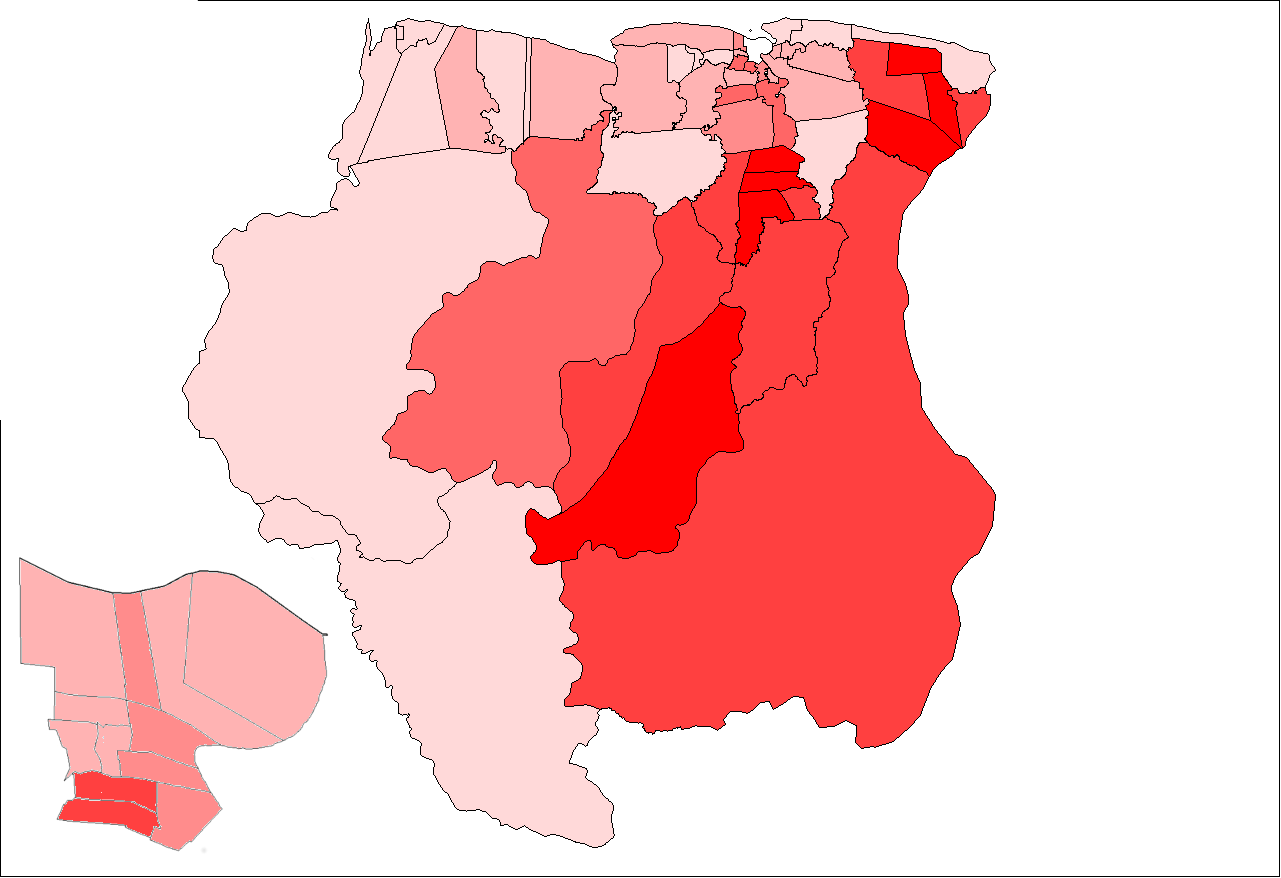
Districts of Suriname showing concentration of Maroons as a percentage of total population

== Language ==
The sources of the Surinamese Maroon vocabulary are the English language, Portuguese, some Dutch and a variety of African languages. Between 5% and 20% of the vocabulary is of African origin. Its phonology is closest to that of African languages. The Surinamese Maroons have developed a system of meaning-distinctive intonation, as is common in Africa.

== Religion ==
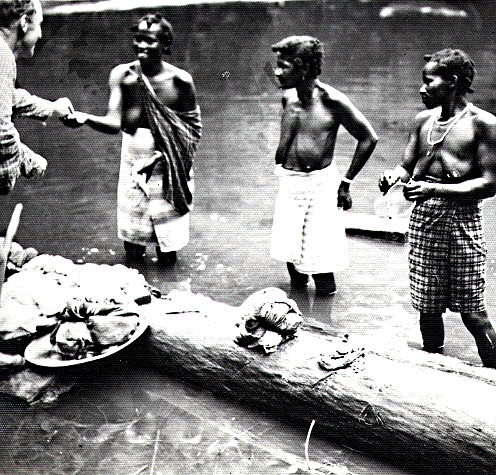
Maroons in Suriname, 1955

The traditional Surinamese Maroon religion is called Winti. It is a syncretization of different African religious beliefs and practices brought in mainly by the Akan and Fon enslaved peoples. Winti is typical for Suriname, where it originated. The religion has a pantheon of spirits called Winti. Ancestor veneration is central. It has no written sources, nor a central authority. Practising Winti was forbidden by law for nearly one hundred years. Since the 1970s, many Maroons have moved to urban areas and have become evangelical. After the turn of the millennium Winti gained momentum. It is becoming more popular, especially in the Maroon diaspora.

Religion of Surinamese Maroons (2012)
Religion	Number of adherents	%
Christianity	74,392	63.3%
Catholic	27,626	23.5%
Pentecostal	21,746	18.5%
Moravian Church	19,093	16.2%
Other christian	5,927	5.1%
No religion	25,270	21.5%
Winti	9,657	8.2%
No answer	5,116	4.4%
Other	1,755	1.5%
Don't know	1,377	1.2%
Total	117,567	100.0%

== See also ==
- Demographics of Suriname
- Slavery in Suriname
