= Boven Coppename =

Coordinates: 4°32′17.14″N 56°15′19.77″W

- Resort
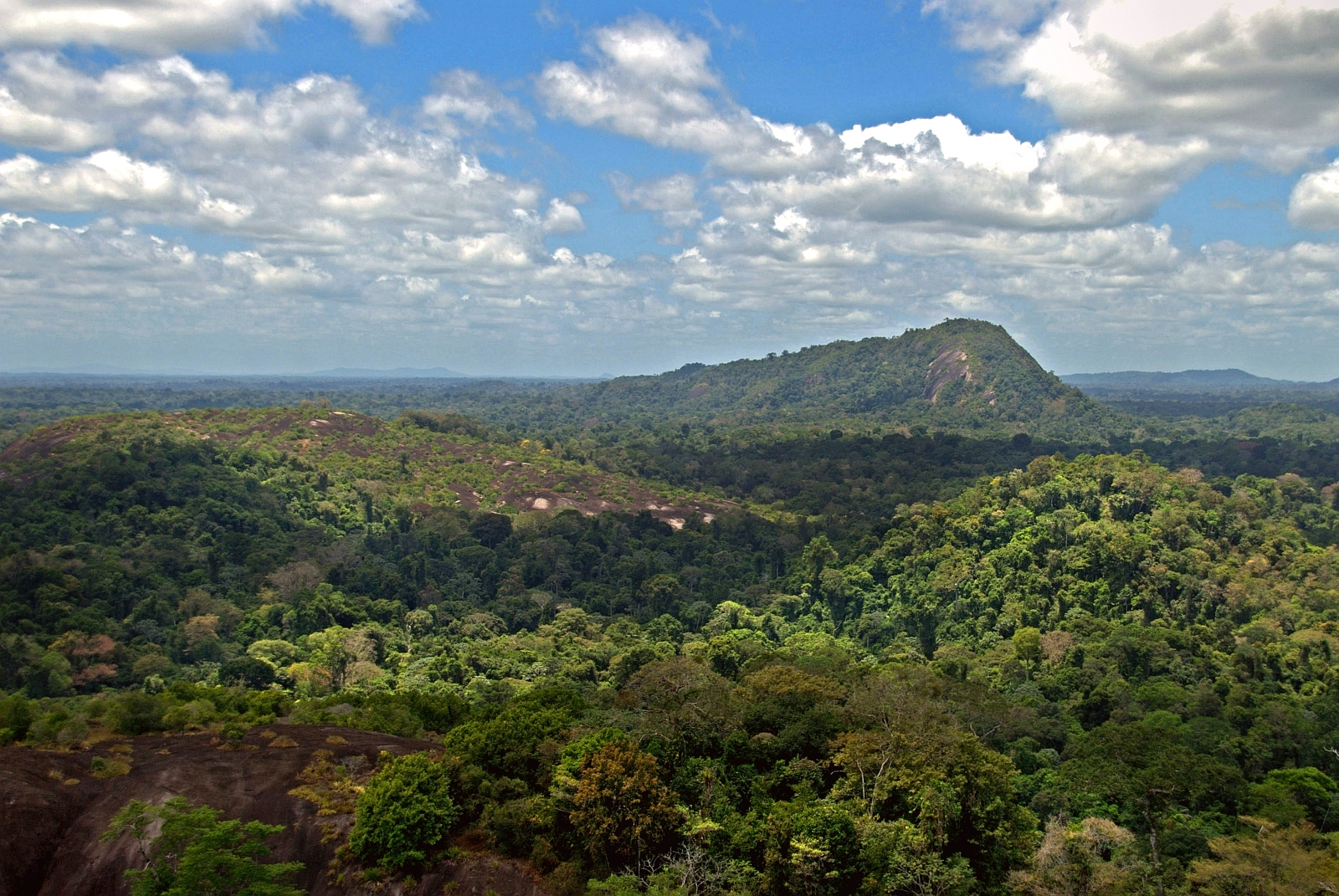
- Van Stockumberg viewed from Mt. Voltzberg

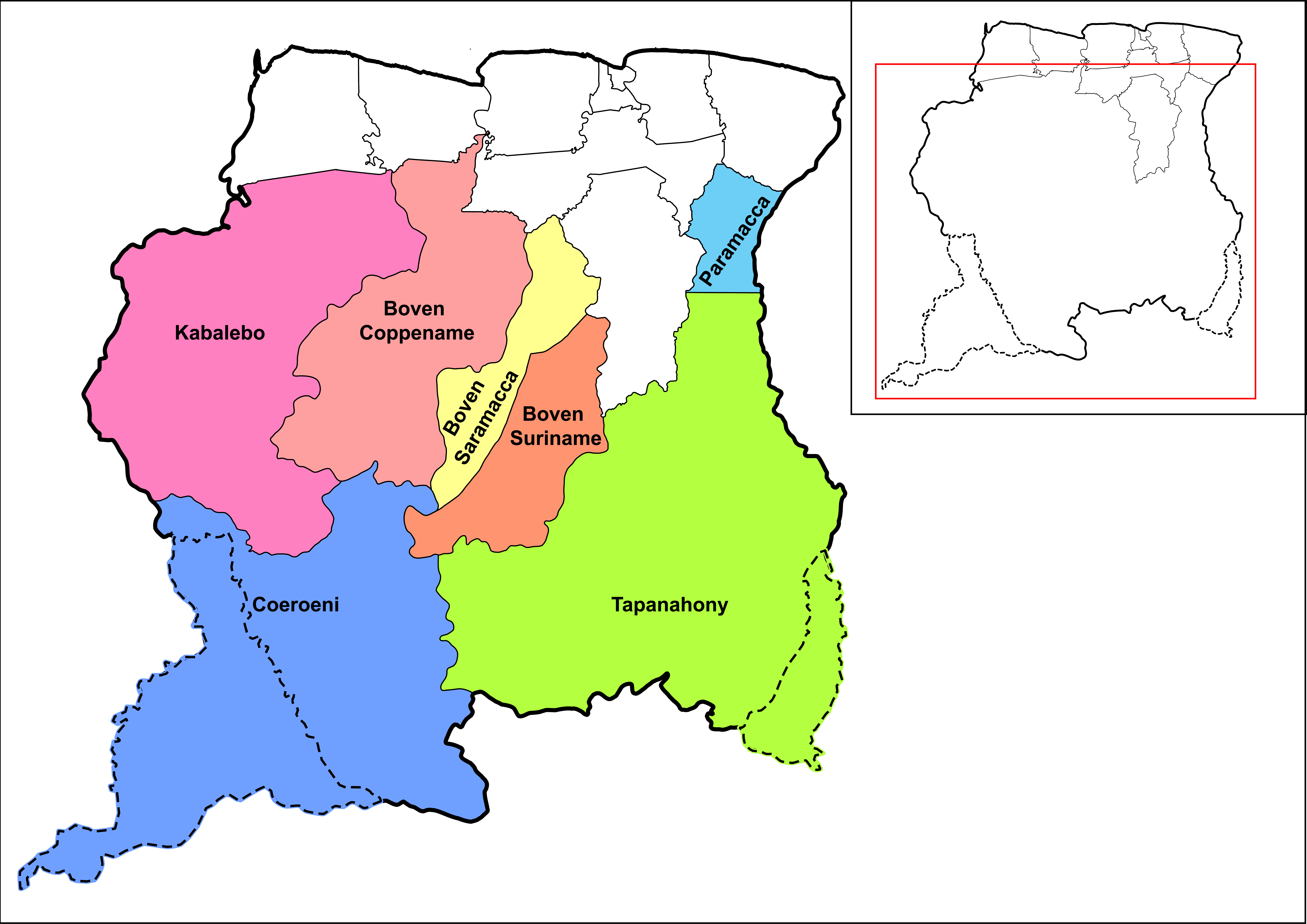
- Map showing the resorts of Sipaliwini District. Boven Coppename
- Country: Suriname
- District: Sipaliwini District

Area
  - Total: 15,839 km^{2} (6,115 sq mi)

Population (2012 census)
  - Total: 539
  - Density: 0.0340/km^{2} (0.0881/sq mi)
- Time zone: UTC-3 (AST)

Boven Coppename is a resort in Suriname, located in the Sipaliwini District. Its population at the 2012 census was 539. The resort is mainly inhabited by indigenous people of the Tiriyó, and Maroons of the Kwinti tribe. The main village is Bitagron. Other villages include Corneliskondre and Donderskamp.

== Nature ==
The area is covered with a high dry land forest and mist forests at high altitudes. The resort is home to the Emma Range, a mountainous range located between the drainage basin of the Saramacca and the Coppename River. The highest mountain in Suriname, Julianatop is located in Boven Coppename.
