= Maripaston =

- Village
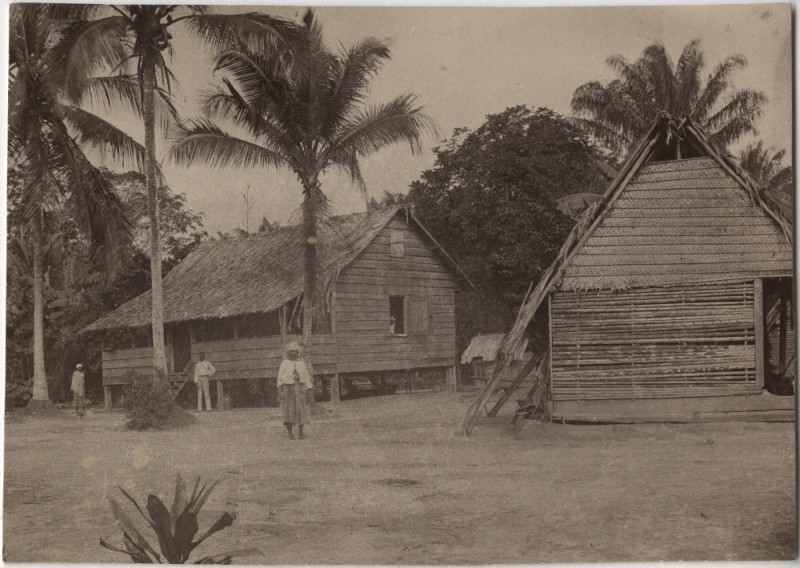
- Maripaston (1890)

- Location within Suriname
- Coordinates: 5.3305°N 55.3530°W
- Country: Suriname
- District: Para District
- Resort: Bigi Poika
- Time zone: UTC-3 (AST)

Maripaston was a village situated in the Bigi Poika resort of the Para District, Suriname. The village was located along the Saramacca River and used to be the main village of the Matawai maroons, a group of descendants of African slaves who escaped and formed their own communities in the interior of Suriname.

== History ==
The site where Maripaston was established had previously been the location of the wood plantation Sonnette, which had been operational since at least 1819 but was abandoned after 1832. The village itself was founded after 1836 by Adensi, the daughter of granman (paramount leader) Kodjo, though the inhabitants were later forced to leave by the authorities. In 1852, Noah Adrai resettled the village, and a Moravian church was constructed there in 1860 by Johannes King, a missionary.

Maripaston grew to become the principal village of the Matawai and the seat of their granman. However, in 1898, when Lavanti Agubaka, who lived in Boven Saramacca, was elected as the new granman, Maripaston lost its status as the main village of the Matawai. Despite plans developed in 1899 to build a tramway from Berlijn to Maripaston, the line was never constructed.

The last recorded mention of Maripaston as a settled place was in 1951, suggesting that the village has since been abandoned. However, the area has continued to see economic activity, particularly through illegal gold prospecting. In 2011, a gold concession in the area was awarded to Grassalco, a company that is currently operating a gold mine there.

Maripaston is accessible only by boat, located about half an hour downstream from Kwakoegron.

== Notable people ==
- Johannes King (~1830-1898), missionary and writer.

== Gallery ==
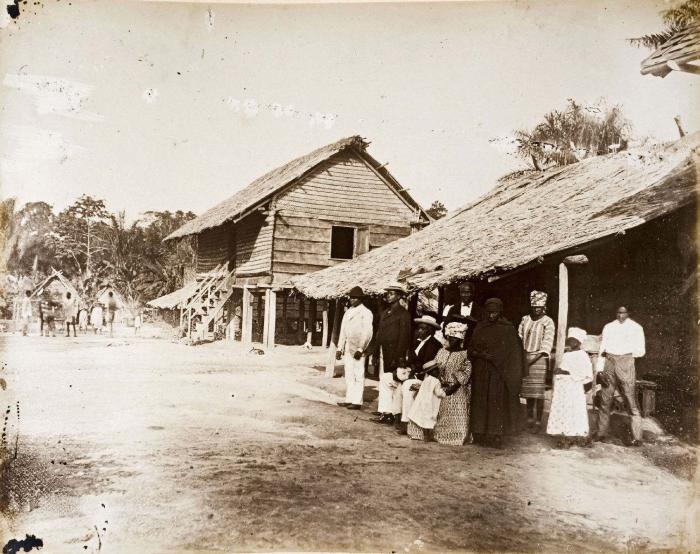
Granman Adrai Vroomhart in Maripaston

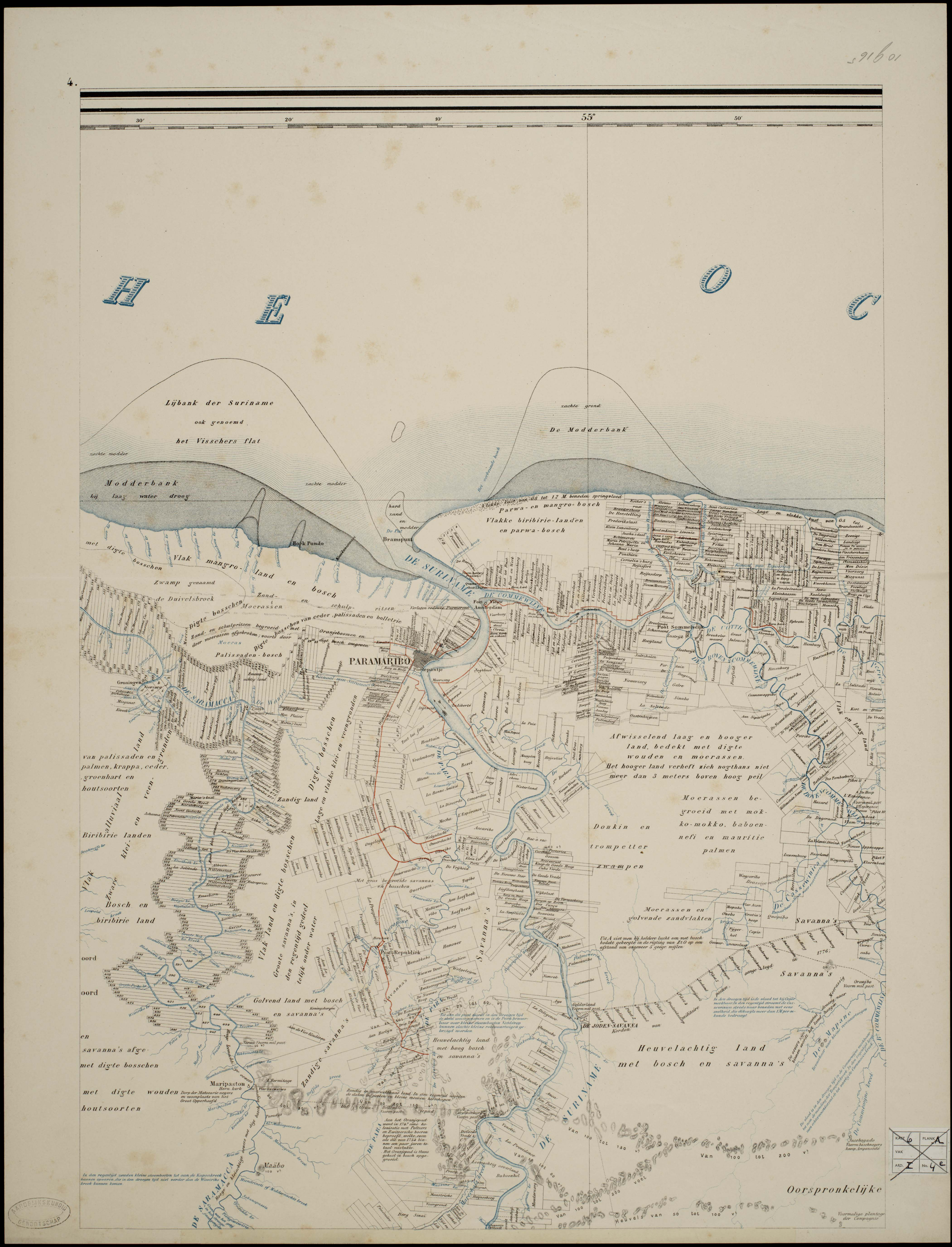
Maripaston on a 1880 map (bottom left)
