= Kwinti people =

Kwinti
Total population
- 1,000 (2014, est.)

Regions with significant populations
- Bitagron and Heidoti, Suriname: 300

Languages
- Kwinti, Sranan Tongo, Dutch

Religion
- Christianity mainly Moravian Church

Related ethnic groups
- Saramaka, Matawai, Ndyukas

Granman of the Kwinti people
- Incumbent; Remon Clemens since 2020
- Residence: Bitagron

The Kwinti are a Maroon people, descendants of runaway African slaves, living in the forested interior of Suriname on the bank of the Coppename River, and the eponymous term for their language, which has fewer than 300 speakers. Their language is an English-based creole with Dutch, Portuguese and other influences. It is similar to the languages spoken by the Aluku and Paramaccan Maroons, and split from Sranan Tongo in the middle 18th century. The Kwinti had a population of about 300 in 2014 and adhere to the Moravian Church.

== History ==
There are two possible origins of the Kwinti people. One oral account mentions the Berbice slave uprising of 1763 in Guyana, the other mentions a plantation in the Para District. The tribe was initially led by Boku who died in 1765. Boku was succeeded by Kofi, who is claimed to be a brother of Boni. The tribe was known from the early 18th century, and there had been several raids on plantations conducted by the Kwinti.

On 19 September 1762, the Dutch signed a peace treaty with the Saramaka. In 1769, the Matawai split from the Saramaka, and asked the Government for weapons against the Kwinti who had raided the Onoribo plantation in November 1766. During the late 18th century the tribe was attacked many times by either the Matawai or the colonists. In the 1850s, the Kwinti had made a peace treaty with the Matawai granman, and settled among the Matawai in Boven Saramacca. There are currently two villages which are inhabited by both tribes. Another part of the tribe, settled on the Coppename River where they founded Coppencrisie (Coppename Christians). Later the village was abandoned, and the villages of Bitagron and Kaaimanston were established.

During the 19th century the tribe is hardly ever mentioned until a peace treaty with the Surinamese Government is signed in 1887. The treaty appointed Alamun as a head captain and not as a granman. The treaty gives him control over the Kwinti living along the Coppename River, the Kwinti living on Saramacca River remained under the authority of the Matawai. In 1894, the area of control was delimited around Bitagron and Kaaimanston, because of nearby wood and balatá concessions. Also a posthouder (post holder) was installed to represent the government. Until the early 20th century, there used to be a trail connecting both sides, but it had fallen into disuse and was reclaimed by the jungle.

In 1970, when the Dutch government organised a well published tour with the five Surinamese Maroon nations to Ghana and other African countries, the Kwinti were not invited. In 1978, Matheus Cornells Marcus was appointed as head captain in Bitagron. In 1987, during the Surinamese Interior War, Bitagron was partially destroyed during the fighting with the Jungle Commando. Later the other villages were isolated from the outside world by the Tucayana Amazonas. The other villages were in Matawai territory, and under the control of Lavanti Agubaka who was allied with the Tucayana Amazonas. On 30 September 1989, the Kwinti announced that they no longer recognized Lavanti, and demanded a granman for their nation. In 2002, André Mathias was the first tribal chief to rule as granman over all villages except for those where the Kwinti were in a minority; he died in 2018. Remon Clemens was named as granman in 2020.

== Religion ==
The traditional religion of the Maroons is Winti. In the shared area with the Matawai, the Moravian Church had been highly successful after Johannes King, a Matawai, became their first Maroon missionary. The Moravian Church operated a mission in Kaaimanston, and in the 1920s, the Catholic Church started missionary activities in the Coppename area.

== Villages ==
Kwinti settlements
- Bitagron
- Heidoti
- Kaaimanston

The Kwinti are in a minority in the following villages:

- Pakka-Pakka
- Makajapingo

== Bibliography ==
- Borges, Robert (2014). The Life of Languagedynamics of language contact in Suriname (PDF) (Thesis). Utrecht: Radboud University Nijmegen.
- Elst, Dirk van der (1973). "The Coppename Kwinti: Notes on an Afro-American tribe in Suriname". Nieuwe West-Indische Gids - Year 15. University of Florida.
- Hoogbergen, Wim (1 January 1992). "Origins of the Suriname Kwinti Maroons". New West Indian Guide / Nieuwe West-Indische Gids. 66 (1–2): 27–59. doi:10.1163/13822373-90002003.
- Green, E.C. (1974). The Matawai Maroons: An Acculturating Afro American Society (PhD. dissertation). Washington, D.C.: Catholic University of America.
- Migge, Bettina; Léglise, Isabelle (2013). Exploring Language in a Multilingual Context: Variation, Interaction and Ideology in Language Documentation. New York: Cambridge University Press.
- Scholtens, Ben (1994). Bosneger en overheid in Suriname. Radboud University Nijmegen (Thesis) (in Dutch). Paramaribo: Afdeling Cultuurstudies/Minov. ISBN 9991410155.
