= Kwattahede =

- Location in Suriname
- Coordinates: 4°48′31″N 55°32′57″W
- Country: Suriname
- District: Sipaliwini District
- Resort (municipality): Boven Saramacca
- Elevation: 226 ft (69 m)
- Time zone: UTC -3

Kwattahede (also: Kwataede) is a village in Boven Saramacca resort in Sipaliwini District in Suriname. The village is inhabited by Matawai people.

The village was founded in the 1880s by Johannes King and is situated in the middle of the river. The village has no school, no clinic, but does have a church. The village did have a school in 1907, but was abandoned during the Surinamese Interior War. It has been slightly repopulated in the 21st century.

Nearby towns and villages include Moetoetoetabriki (1.4 nm), Heidoti (3.2 nm), Jacobkondre (8.1 nm), La Valere (13.0 nm) and Tabrikiekondre (3.0 nm).
