= Boslanti =

- Village
- Location within Suriname
- Coordinates: 4.32926°N 55.78399°W
- Country: Suriname
- District: Sipaliwini District
- Resort: Boven Saramacca

Population (1981)
  - Total: circa 200
- Time zone: UTC-3 (AST)

Boslanti is a village of Matawai Maroons in the resort of Boven Saramacca in the Sipaliwini District of Suriname. Boslanti is located on the Saramacca River.

== Overview ==
Boslanti which translates to Forest Land is located in the Central Suriname Nature Reserve. The village was founded in the 19th century, and consists of a cluster of settlements each inhabited by a different maternal lineage.

In 1919, the Moravian Church started missionary activities in the village. From the 1960s onwards, a migration towards the urban area started. The village has a school and a health care clinic is located in neighbouring Poesoegroenoe. In 2020, clean drinking water was provided for the village.

== Transport ==
Boslanti used to accessible by boat only. In the early 20th century, a journey from Paramaribo would take about a week. The village later became accessible by air from the Poesoegroenoe Airstrip. In 2017, a road opened connecting Boslanti to the rest of Suriname.

== Bibliography ==
- Beet, Chris de (1981). People in between: the Matawai Maroons of Suriname (PDF). Krips Repro, Meppel.
