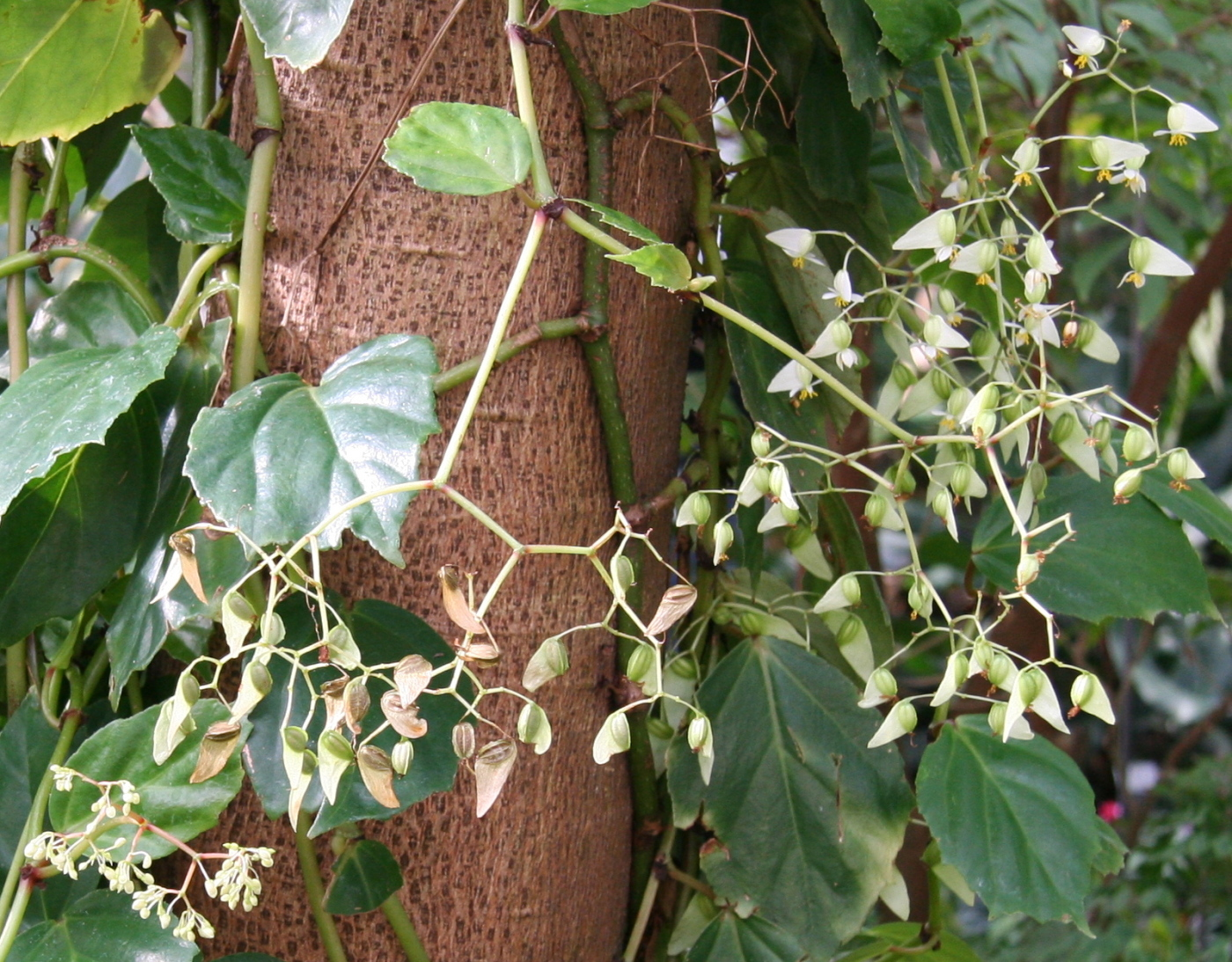
- Climbing a tree

Scientific classification
- Kingdom: Plantae
- Clade: Tracheophytes
- Clade: Angiosperms
- Clade: Eudicots
- Clade: Rosids
- Order: Cucurbitales
- Family: Begoniaceae
- Genus: Begonia
- Species: B. glabra

Binomial name
- Begonia glabra Aubl.

Synonyms
- List: Begonia elliptica Kunth; Begonia glabra var. amplifolia (A.DC.) L.B.Sm. & B.G.Schub.; Begonia hoegeana Regel & Schmidt; Begonia locellata A.DC.; Begonia lucida Otto & A.Dietr.; Begonia moritziana Kunth & C.D.Bouché; Begonia physalifolia Liebm.; Begonia populifolia Schott; Begonia repens Sessé & Moc.; Begonia scandens Sw.; Begonia scandens var. amplifolia A.DC.; Begonia scandens var. cordifolia C.DC.; Wageneria deflexa Klotzsch; Wageneria glabra (Aubl.) Klotzsch; Wageneria lucida Klotzsch; Wageneria montana Klotzsch

= Begonia glabra =

Species of flowering plant

Begonia glabra, the climbing sorrel, is a species of flowering plant in the family Begoniaceae, native to the New World Tropics. An unusual vining begonia, it is popular in vivariums. Its use in the Winti Afro-Surinamese traditional religion has led to local over-collection.
