= Afro-Surinamese =

Surinamese people of predominantly African ancestry

Afro-Surinamers (Dutch)

Regions with significant populations
- Suriname; Netherlands

Languages
- Dutch, Sranan Tongo, Maroon languages

Religion
- Christianity, Winti

Afro-Surinamese (Dutch: Afro-Surinamers) are Surinamese people of predominantly Sub-Saharan African ancestry. They are largely descended from Africans who were forcibly brought to Suriname through the Atlantic slave trade during the colonial period.

Afro-Surinamese include descendants of enslaved Africans who remained within plantation and urban colonial society, often referred to as Creoles, as well as the Maroons, descendants of enslaved Africans who escaped from plantations and established autonomous communities in Suriname's interior.

The 2012 census recorded 84,933 people as Creole, 117,567 as Maroon and 3,923 specifically as Afro-Surinamese. Taken together, these separately recorded categories numbered 206,423 people, approximately 38.1% of Suriname's population.

== Origins ==
The African ancestors of Afro-Surinamese came primarily from several regions of West Africa and Central Africa. Of an estimated 220,000 enslaved Africans transported to Suriname, about 61,500 (27%) embarked from West-Central Africa, 46,000 (21%) from the Gold Coast, 45,000 (20%) from the Windward Coast and more than 32,000 (14%) from the Bight of Benin. Smaller numbers came from the Bight of Biafra and other regions.

In modern geographical terms, these principal regions correspond broadly to parts of Ghana; Ivory Coast, Liberia and Sierra Leone; Togo, Benin and western Nigeria; and parts of West-Central Africa, including present-day Angola, the Democratic Republic of the Congo, the Republic of the Congo, Gabon and Cameroon.

The relative importance of these regions changed over time. During the earlier period of the slave trade, the Slave Coast and Loango Coast were major sources of enslaved people brought to Suriname. The Gold Coast became increasingly important during the 18th century, while the Windward Coast also became a major source after about 1740. The enslaved population was therefore ethnically and linguistically diverse, including Akan, Gbe-speaking and Bantu-speaking populations, among others. These different African populations contributed to the languages, religious traditions, music and other cultural practices that developed among Afro-Surinamese.

== History ==
=== Slavery ===
Before European colonization, the region that became Suriname was inhabited by Indigenous peoples. The development of the plantation colony from the mid-17th century brought European expansion into Indigenous lands and conflict with Indigenous communities.

After the Dutch gained control of Suriname from the English in 1667, the colony developed an economy based heavily on plantation agriculture and the enslavement of Africans. Enslaved Africans were brought to the colony in large numbers to work on plantations producing sugar, coffee, cocoa, cotton and other commodities.

Conditions under slavery were harsh. Enslaved people were subjected to forced labour, physical punishment and restrictions on movement and family life. The plantation system depended heavily on the continued forced migration of Africans across the Atlantic.

Despite slavery and the diversity of their African origins, enslaved people developed new communities and cultural traditions in Suriname. African cultural traditions were preserved and transformed under the conditions of plantation society, contributing to the development of Afro-Surinamese music, dance, religion and oral traditions.

Resistance to slavery took many forms, including work resistance, revolt and escape. Some people who escaped from plantations established communities in the forested interior. These communities developed into the Maroon societies. Following prolonged conflict, the colonial government concluded peace treaties with several Maroon peoples, beginning with the Ndyuka in 1760 and the Saramaka in 1762.

=== Emancipation and state supervision ===
Slavery was abolished in Suriname on 1 July 1863. More than 32,000 enslaved people were legally emancipated. The Dutch government compensated slaveholders for the loss of people whom the law had treated as their property, while the formerly enslaved received no comparable financial compensation.

For most formerly enslaved plantation workers, emancipation did not immediately bring unrestricted freedom of movement and employment. From 1863 until 1873 they were placed under staatstoezicht ("state supervision"). Under this system, formerly enslaved people were required to work under labour contracts and remained subject to government supervision. State supervision ended in 1873.

=== After emancipation ===
After the end of state supervision in 1873, many Afro-Surinamese left the plantations and moved to Paramaribo, while others remained in the plantation districts or found work in gold mining, forestry and the balata industry. Paramaribo increasingly became the centre of Afro-Surinamese social, economic and cultural life. To meet the demand for plantation labour, the colonial authorities recruited indentured workers from abroad, particularly from British India and the Dutch East Indies.

During the late 19th and early 20th centuries, education became an important avenue of social mobility, and Afro-Surinamese became increasingly represented in the civil service, education and other urban occupations. Social distinctions nevertheless persisted within the Creole population, and a relatively small Creole elite, often of mixed African and European descent, held considerable influence in political and administrative life during the first half of the 20th century.

The expansion of political participation in the mid-20th century gradually weakened the dominance of this established elite. The National Party of Suriname (NPS), founded in 1946, developed a broad Afro-Surinamese Creole base, and during the 1950s, Johan Adolf Pengel emerged as an influential leader within the party and in Surinamese politics more broadly.

Maroon communities in the interior followed a partly different historical trajectory. Construction of the Afobaka Dam in the 1960s created the Brokopondo Reservoir and displaced 27 Maroon villages, most of them Saramaka settlements, affecting approximately 5,000 to 6,000 people. During the Surinamese Interior War (1986–1992), Maroon communities in eastern Suriname were particularly affected by fighting and displacement; thousands fled, including to Paramaribo and French Guiana.

== Demographics and distribution ==
The 2012 census recorded 84,933 people in the Creole category, 117,567 as Maroon and 3,923 specifically as Afro-Surinamese. Taken together, these categories numbered 206,423 people, representing approximately 38.1% of Suriname's population.

Afro-Surinamese live throughout Suriname, with substantial populations in Paramaribo and neighbouring Wanica. Creoles are particularly concentrated in Paramaribo and several coastal districts, while large Maroon populations live in the interior, especially in Brokopondo, Marowijne and Sipaliwini. Internal migration has also resulted in a substantial Maroon population in Paramaribo.

== Groups ==
Within the Afro-Surinamese population are several historically formed group identities, including Creoles and Maroons. Not every Afro-Surinamese person, however, necessarily identifies with either group. Their distinct historical development reflects different experiences during and after slavery.

=== Creoles ===
The term Creole has changed in meaning over the course of Surinamese history. Historically, it could refer broadly to people born in the colony rather than overseas. During the 20th century, it increasingly became an ethnic designation for descendants of enslaved Africans associated principally with Paramaribo and the coastal region.

The Creole population included both people of predominantly African ancestry and people of mixed African and European ancestry. In contemporary Suriname, people who identify primarily as being of mixed ancestry may instead identify with the separate "Mixed" category.

In the 2012 census, 84,933 people identified as Creole, representing 15.7% of Suriname's population.

=== Maroons ===
The Maroons are Afro-Surinamese descended primarily from enslaved Africans who escaped from plantations and established autonomous communities in Suriname's forested interior. Their distinct historical development contributed to the preservation and development of their own political institutions, languages and cultural traditions.

The six Maroon peoples of Suriname are the Ndyuka, Saramaka, Paramaccan, Matawai, Kwinti and Aluku. Although historically concentrated in the interior, Maroon populations also live in Paramaribo, French Guiana and the Netherlands.

== Culture ==
Afro-Surinamese culture developed from the interaction of numerous West and Central African traditions under the conditions of colonial and post-colonial Suriname. European and Indigenous influences were also incorporated over time. Afro-Surinamese culture consequently encompasses considerable regional, religious and social diversity.

=== Language ===
Sranan Tongo developed during the colonial period and became strongly associated with Afro-Surinamese. It subsequently became a widely used lingua franca across Suriname.

Dutch, the official language of Suriname, is widely spoken among Afro-Surinamese and is the principal language of education and government. Several Maroon languages are spoken, particularly among communities originating in the interior, including Ndyuka, Saramaccan and related varieties.

=== Religion ===
Christianity is widespread among Afro-Surinamese. Major Christian traditions include the Moravian Church, Roman Catholicism, and various other Protestant and Pentecostal denominations. The Moravian Church has historically played a particularly important role among the Afro-Surinamese population.

Winti is an Afro-Surinamese religion that developed in Suriname from religious and cosmological traditions of African origin. It encompasses beliefs and practices concerning spiritual beings, ancestors, healing and relationships between the human and spiritual worlds. Christianity and Winti have also influenced one another, and some Afro-Surinamese participate in practices associated with both traditions.

=== Music and other traditions ===
African-derived music, dance and oral traditions have had a major influence on Surinamese culture. Kawina is an Afro-Surinamese musical tradition with roots in the plantation districts and is characterised by percussion and call-and-response singing. Kaseko developed from earlier Afro-Surinamese musical traditions and incorporated influences from brass-band, Caribbean and other popular music. Both became important forms of Surinamese popular music.

Afro-Surinamese traditions have also contributed to Surinamese dance, storytelling, cuisine and festivals. Keti Koti, observed annually on 1 July, commemorates the abolition of slavery in Suriname and is an important commemoration in both Suriname and the Netherlands.

== Diaspora ==
The Netherlands is the principal centre of the Afro-Surinamese diaspora. Migration increased after the Second World War, initially including Afro-Surinamese who moved to the Netherlands for education. Until the 1960s, Afro-Surinamese Creoles constituted most Surinamese migrants to the Netherlands; migration from Suriname became more ethnically diverse as it increased during the period preceding independence in 1975.

A substantial Afro-Surinamese Creole community developed particularly in Amsterdam, with many Surinamese migrants settling in the Bijlmermeer from the 1970s. Afro-Surinamese communities also became established elsewhere in the Randstad. Maroons also began migrating to the Netherlands from the 1960s. The Surinamese Interior War (1986–1992) later gave further impetus to this migration.

== Notable people ==
The following are notable Afro-Surinamese people and people of Afro-Surinamese descent.

=== Arts and culture ===
- Lieve Hugo, singer
- Ruth Jacott, singer
- Kenny B, singer
- Jeangu Macrooy, singer-songwriter
- Max Nijman, singer
- Eva Simons, singer

=== Business ===
- Elisabeth Samson, 18th-century plantation owner and businesswoman

=== Politics and public life ===
- Henck Arron, politician and former prime minister
- Boni, Maroon leader
- Dési Bouterse, military officer and politician
- Ronnie Brunswijk, politician and former rebel leader
- Anton de Kom, anti-colonial writer and resistance fighter
- Johan Adolf Pengel, politician and former prime minister
- Ronald Venetiaan, politician and former president
- Jules Wijdenbosch, politician and former president
- Renate Wouden, Surinamese activist

=== Science and medicine ===
- Jan Ernst Matzeliger, inventor
- Sophie Redmond, physician and activist

=== Sports ===
- Remy Bonjasky, kickboxer
- Edgar Davids, footballer
- Virgil van Dijk, footballer
- Francisco Elson, basketball player
- Ryan Gravenberch, footballer
- Ruud Gullit, footballer
- Ernesto Hoost, kickboxer
- André Kamperveen, footballer and sports administrator
- Patrick Kluivert, footballer and manager
- Melvin Manhoef, mixed martial artist and kickboxer
- Humphrey Mijnals, footballer
- Anthony Nesty, swimmer
- Damian Pinas, mixed martial artist
- Frank Rijkaard, footballer and manager
- Jairzinho Rozenstruik, mixed martial artist and kickboxer
- Clarence Seedorf, footballer and manager
- Regilio Tuur, boxer
- Letitia Vriesde, athlete
- Georginio Wijnaldum, footballer

== See also ==
- African diaspora
- Demographics of Suriname
- Keti Koti
- Slavery in Suriname
- Surinamese Maroons
- Winti

== Bibliography ==
- Borges, Robert (2014). The Life of Language. Dynamics of language contact in Suriname (PDF) (Thesis). Utrecht: Radboud University Nijmegen.
- Scholtens, Ben (1994). Bosneger en overheid in Suriname. Radboud University Nijmegen (Thesis) (in Dutch). Paramaribo: Afdeling Cultuurstudies/Minov. ISBN 9991410155.
