= Saramacca =

Saramacca may refer to:

- Saramacca District, Suriname
- Saramacca River, Suriname
- Saramaka or Saramacca peoples
- Saramaccan language
