= Matawai people =

Matawai
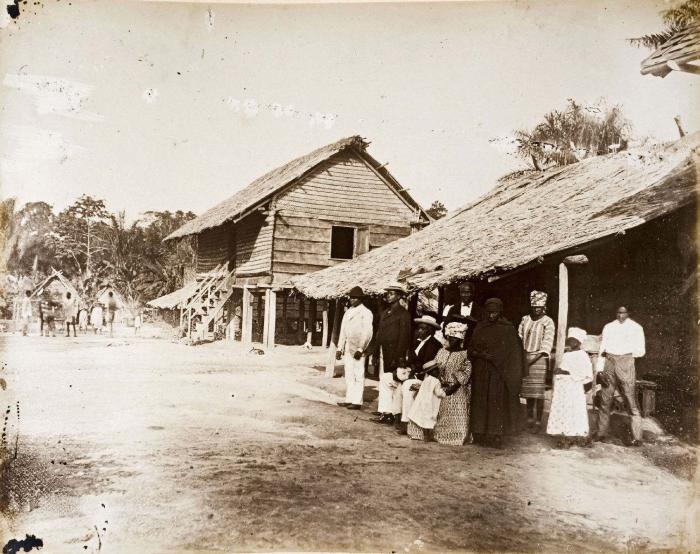
- Matawai village

Total population
- 7,000 (2014, est.)

Regions with significant populations
- Kwakoegron and Boven Saramacca, Suriname: 1,300
- Wanica and Paramaribo: 5,500

Languages
- Matawai, Sranan Tongo and Dutch

Religion
- Christianity, mainly Moravian Church

Related ethnic groups
- Saramaka, Kwinti

Granman of the Matawai people
- Incumbent; Lesley Valentijn since 2011
- Residence: Poesoegroenoe

The Matawai (also Matuariërs) are a tribe of Surinamese Maroons. The Matawai were originally part of the Saramaka, and signed a peace agreement with the Dutch colonists in 1762. The tribe split from the Saramaka, and in 1769, they were recognized as a separate tribe.

== History ==
The origin of the Matawai people is unclear, but oral accounts often mention the plantations Hamburg and Uitkijk. The plantations at the Jodensavanne are a possible source as well. During the 18th century, slaves escaped from the plantations and settled in the interior. According to oral accounts, a group of escaped slaves settled near the Tafelberg in the 1730s. In 1762, a full century before the general emancipation of slaves in Suriname, a group known as the Saramaka signed a peace treaty with the Dutch colonists to acknowledge their territorial rights and trading privileges. After the death of captain Abini, the relationships within the tribe became tense which ultimately resulted in captains Beku and Musinga separating from the Saramaka, and forming the Matawai. In 1769, the Matawai signed a separate peace treaty with the Dutch colonists.

According to oral tradition, the Matawai first settled in Toido. Kwakoegron and villages to the north of Kwakoegron were the main settlements in the 19th century. During the 19th century, villages were established along the Saramacca River where a mixed population of Matawai and other Maroons live. In 1974, the aforementioned area was added to the authority of the granman (paramount chief) and is nowadays known as the Boven Saramacca resort. Poesoegroenoe is home to the granman of the Matawai, and was originally designated as the main village, however Nieuw Jacobkondre has become more important due to its connection to the Southern East-West Link, and nearby airstrip. There were 19 villages controlled by the Matawai; however, the Surinamese Interior War caused the abandonment of six villages.

In the 1960s the population in the villages started to move to the urban area. In the 1970s, almost half the population had left the area, and mainly settled in the Wanica District next to the capital Paramaribo. In 2014, according to the estimate of Richard Price, about 5,500 Matawai lived in the urban areas, and about 1,300 in the villages.

== Religion ==
Johannes King (1830–1898), a son of the granman, became the first Maroon missionary for the Moravian Church. In 1920s the Catholic Church performed missionary activities in the downriver region. As a result, nearly all Matawai are Christian and mainly adhere to the Moravian Church.

== Agriculture and economy ==
Traditionally, the Matawai lived on subsistence agriculture, hunting, gathering and fishing. In the most densely populated areas, the gardens have not reached depletion. Gold mining around Nieuw Jacobkondre, and logging are a major source of income. Ecotourism is being promoted in Ebbatop, Nieuw Jacobkondre, and Poesoegroenoe.

== Language ==
The Matawai have their own language, which is related to the Saramaka language and is derived from Plantation Creole, which is now known as Sranan Tongo. However, the branch diverted around 1700 and evolved separately.

Matawai is an endangered language spoken in the villages, but code switching with Sranan Tongo, other Maroon languages, and Dutch is common. In the urban areas, Sranan Tongo and Dutch have become the main languages, and many parents promote Dutch as the primary language.

== Villages ==
Heidoti and Moetoetoetabriki are next to Nieuw Jacobkondre.
- Boslanti
- Heidoti
- Kwakoegron
- Kwattahede
- Makajapingo
- Maripaston
- Moetoetoetabriki
- Nieuw Jacobkondre
- Pakka-Pakka
- Poesoegroenoe
- Tabrikiekondre
- Warnakomoponafaja

== Bibliography ==
- Beet, Chris de (1981). People in between: the Matawai Maroons of Suriname (PDF). Krips Repro, Meppel – via Digital Library for Dutch Literature.
- Borges, Robert (2014). The Life of Language. Dynamics of language contact in Suriname (PDF) (Thesis). Utrecht: Radboud University Nijmegen.
- Migge, Bettina (2017). Putting Matawai on the Surinamese Linguistic Map. John Benjamins Publishing.
- Plan Bureau (2014). "Planning Office Suriname - Districts 2009-2013" (PDF). Planning Office Suriname (in Dutch).
- Price, Richard (1983). First-time: The Historical Vision of an Afro-American People. Baltimore: Johns Hopkins University Press. ISBN 9780801829857.
