= Pakkapakka =

Pakka-Pakka Pakkapakka
- Location in Suriname
- Coordinates: 4°37′54″N 55°40′31″W
- Country: Suriname
- District: Sipaliwini District
- Resort (municipality): Boven Saramacca
- Elevation: 240 ft (73 m)
- Time zone: UTC-3

Pakka-Pakka or Pakkapakka, also Pakkapakka 1 (right side river) and Pakkapakka 2 (left side), is a Maroon village in the rainforest of Boven Saramacca resort in Sipaliwini District in Suriname. The village is inhabited by Matawai people. The village was founded in the 1860s and was originally home to both Matawai and Kwinti people.

The village has no school, no clinic, but does have a church. There was a school in 1924.

Nearby towns and villages include Kapoesanti (25.0 nm), Kaaimanston (36.8 nm), Moetoetoetabriki (13.9 nm), Heidoti (15.6 nm), Stonkoe (6.3 nm), Makajapingo (8.6 nm) and Asoenoebo (1.0 nm) .
