= Villa Brazil =

- Gold mining village
- Location in Suriname
- Coordinates: 5.00843°N 55.52441°W
- Country: Suriname
- District: Sipaliwini District
- Resort: Boven Saramacca

Villa Brazil (also Villa Brasil) is a garimpeiros (illegal gold prospector) village in the Boven Saramacca resort of the Sipaliwini District of Suriname.

== Overview ==
Gold was discovered in the Rosebel area in 1879. More than century after, in 2004, a commercial exploitation started at the Rosebel Gold Mines. Illegal gold miners started to exploit the Matawai area near Nieuw Jacobkondre. Villa Brazil was founded illegally by Brazilian gold miners, and contains dwellings for the gold miners and several commercial shops.

The village has become known as an area with a high rate of crime. Complaints of the nearby villagers who had rely on a police station in Kwakoegron have resulted the establishment of a police station in Nieuw Jacobkondre in 2014. Concerning morbidity, malaria is prevalent in the village. In late 2020, Villa Brazil was at the centre of a COVID-19 outbreak.

== Mining ==
The gold mining is performed by building of sluice boxes. Mercury is poured over the dirt with bare hands. The method leaves much gold undetected, and therefore some miners are using metal detectors. The mercury pollution in the area is both an environment problem, and a health hazard. Most of the gold gets transported to the North of Paramaribo where the gold buyers are located. In 2021, a badge system was introduced, which requires gold miners to be registered, and gold buyers to track the source of the gold.

== See also ==
- Antonio do Brinco
- Benzdorp

== Bibliography ==
- Versol, Winnie (2007). Artisanal gold mining in Suriname (PDF) (Thesis). Eindhoven University of Technology.
