= Moetoetoetabriki =

- Location in Suriname
- Coordinates: 4°50′N 55°34′W
- Country: Suriname
- District: Sipaliwini District
- Resort (municipality): Boven Saramacca
- Elevation: 200 ft (60 m)
- Time zone: UTC-3

Moetoetoetabriki is a village in Boven Saramacca resort in Sipaliwini District in Suriname. The village is inhabited by Matawai people.

Nearby towns and villages include Heidoti (2.0 nm), Kwattahede (1.4 nm), Pakka-Pakka (13.9 nm), Makajapingo (7.0 nm) and Tabrikiekondre (4.1 nm).
