= Matawai =

Matawai can refer to:

- Matawai people, an ethnic group of Suriname
- Matawai language, the language of Suriname's Matawai people
- Mātāwai, Gisborne District, New Zealand
