= Wilhelmina Mountains =

Mountain range in central Suriname

- Location within Suriname

Highest point
- Elevation: 1,280 m (4,200 ft)
- Coordinates: 3°45′N 56°30′W

Geography
- Country: Suriname

The Wilhelminagebergte (English: Wilhelmina Mountains) is a mountain range in the district of Sipaliwini in central Suriname. It extends about 113 km (70 mi) from west to east. It is named after Queen Wilhelmina. The Wilhelminagebergte is part of the Tumucumaque Uplands of the Guiana Shield. It belongs to the very ancient (Precambrian) Guiana Highlands. Most of it is in the Central Suriname Nature Reserve.

Its best-known peaks are the Julianatop, 1280 m and the country's highest peak, and the Tafelberg, 1026 m. The area is surrounded by tropical rain forest and covered by other forests. It is biologically very diverse, with an estimated 3,000 higher plant species.

Many rivers rise in the Wilhelmina Mountains, including: the two branches of the Coppename; Saramacca; some tributaries of the Suriname; the West and East Rivers; and the Kabalebo.

Nearby mountain ranges include the Bakhuis Mountains (to the NW), the Emmaketen or Emma Range (to the NE), the Van Asch Van Wijck Mountains (also to the NE), and the Eilerts de Haan Mountains (to the S).
