= Renate Wouden =

Renate Carmelita Wouden (November 9, 1949 – March 19, 2023), also known as Renate Wouden-Bhugwandass, was a Surinamese labor and social activist. Her work was especially focused on women's rights and pensioners' rights.

== Biography ==
Renate Wouden was born Renate Bhugwandass in 1949.

At a young age, she was employed as a social worker. She then worked in education, becoming a principal, which led to her initial involvement in the labor movement through the Surinaamse Onderwijzersbond teachers' union.

Wouden was known as a leader in the National Women's Movement, having served on its board. Issues she worked to address as part of the movement included cervical cancer, menopause, and the cost of living. She was also part of the internal group Mafondo, which brought together Maroon women within the organization.

She later became involved with NAKS, or Our African Culture of Suriname, which promotes Afro-Surinamese culture.

From 2014 until her death, Wouden served as chairperson of the Bond voor Belangenbehartiging Gepensioneerden uit Overheidsdienst, a labor organization for retired civil servants. During her time as chair, she grew the group from 1,900 members to 4,800.

In 2018, she was named an Officer in Suriname's Honorary Order of the Palm. In 2021, a delegation from the European Union presented her with a human rights award for her work on behalf of senior citizens.

Wouden died in 2023 at age 73, after a long illness. She was buried with state honors.
