= Kwinti language =

English-based creole of Suriname

Kwinti
- Native to: Suriname
- Ethnicity: Kwinti
- Native speakers: 250 (2018)
- Language family: English Creole: Atlantic; Suriname; Kwinti

Language codes
- ISO 639-3: kww
- Glottolog: kwin1243

Kwinti is an English-based creole of Suriname closely related to Ndyuka. The language has less than 300 speakers, and split from Plantation Creole which is nowadays known as Sranan Tongo in the middle 18th century. Code-switching with Sranan Tongo and Dutch was common among the younger generation in 1973, and about 70% of the tribe have moved to the urban areas. UNESCO considers the language endangered.

In the 1970s, Jan English-Lueck collected a vocabulary of 500 words. Unlike the Ndyuka languages, the letter r is spoken in a similar way to Sranan Tongo and Dutch, although speakers without r have been discovered later. About three quarters of the words were cognate to Sranan Tongo, very few (circa 3%) were cognate to Matawai, and about 17% were not found in the other creoles and mainly originated from Dutch. The differences can be explained by education, because according to a 2011 study the population of Witagron had a good command of both Dutch and Sranan Tongo.

== Bibliography ==
- Borges, Roger (2014). The Life of Languagedynamics of language contact in Suriname (PDF) (PhD. dissertation). Utrecht: Radboud University Nijmegen.
- Elst, Dirk van der (1973). "The Coppename Kwinti: Notes on an Afro-American tribe in Suriname". Nieuwe West-Indische Gids. 55. University of Florida.
- Hoogbergen, Wim (1 January 1992). "Origins of the Suriname Kwinti Maroons". New West Indian Guide / Nieuwe West-Indische Gids. 66 (1–2): 27–59. doi:10.1163/13822373-90002003.
- Green, E.C. (1974). The Matawai Maroons: An Acculturating Afro American Society (PhD. dissertation). Washington, D.C.: Catholic University of America.
