= Johan Eilerts de Haan =

Dutch explorer and soldier

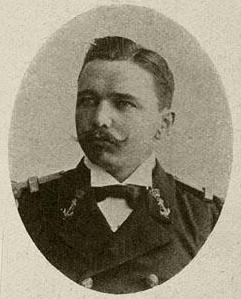
- Johan Eilerts de Haan
- Born: 3 October 1865; Noordwolde, Friesland, Netherlands
- Died: 29 August 1910 (aged 44); Interior of Suriname
- Military career
- Allegiance: Netherlands
- Branch: Royal Netherlands Navy
- Rank: Lieutenant commander

Johannes Gijsbert Willem Jacobus (Johan) Eilerts de Haan (born in Noordwolde, October 3, 1865 - died in the interior of Suriname, August 29, 1910) was a Dutch explorer and soldier. Eilerts de Haan Nature Park in Suriname is named for him.

== Biography ==
Eilerts de Haan was the third son of Frederick Anneus Eilerts de Haan who was then minister in the Frisian village of Noordwolde. Around 1868, the family moved from the southern part of Friesland to Ternaard in the north of that province when his father became minister there.

Eilerts de Haan was educated at the Royal Naval Institute in Willemsoord, Den Helder. His career began in September 1882 as a midshipman third class. From 1886 to 1891 he served as a midshipman first class first in the West Indies, then went on a sailing voyage with the Nautilus and spent three years of the Dutch East Indies during which he was (1889), Commander 2nd class. In 1895 he again went for three years to the East Indies. From 1900 he was second in command for two years in the Marine Department and in 1902 he was promoted to lieutenant 1st class. In 1903 Eilerts de Haan was seconded to the observatory in Utrecht and in October of that year he went again to the East Indies, where he served for three years.

=== Expeditions to the interior of Suriname ===
From June 30, 1908, to November 20, 1908, he led and expedition in Suriname to the source of the Suriname River. Other members of the expedition included lieutenant R.H. Wijmans and health officer Dr. Jhat Tresling. During the expedition a river was discovered on October 16, which he called the Lucie River (probably for a deceased cousin). Two years later, he wrote an article by Eilerts de Haan in the Journal of the Royal Dutch Geographical Society (KNAG) entitled "Report of the expedition to the Suriname River."

On July 19, 1910, began the Corentyne River expedition, with Eilerts de Haan as leader. The aim was to sail from the Suriname River to the Lucie River in the hope of reaching the Corentyne to via the river to return to the Atlantic coast to the data collected during the expedition white spots on the map of Suriname in to fill. It was the duty of the physician and zoologist Fr. J. Hulk, Health Officer 2nd class, to collect zoological and botanical material. On August 18, one of the workers died. On August 21 Eilerts de Haan became ill. Five days later he lost consciousness and on August 29 he died at the age of 44 with probable cause of death as malaria, after which he was buried. The rest of the expedition took more than eight months under the leadership of Commander, 1st Class of Conrad Carel Kayser. Kayser wrote about the trip in a 1912 article for the Society entitled "Report of the Corentyne expedition (19 July 1910-1 April 1911)."

== Legacy ==
The Eilerts de Haan Mountains are named after Johan Eilerts de Haan. On December 5, 1912, a bust of him was erected in Paramaribo at the Vaillantplein. Designed by Bart van Hove, it was later moved to the Little Combéweg and then to the garden of the Surinaams Museum at the Commewijnestraat. The 1921 survey vessel Hr. Ms. Eilerts de Haan was also named after him and his bust is in the Royal Tropical Institute in Amsterdam.

During an expedition in 1926 to the Wilhelmina Mountains with a party including Gerold Stahel (1887-1955), a Swiss botanist. A memorial stone was erected at his graveside by members of the expedition. G. Stahel wrote a book later about the expedition, "De expeditie naar het Wilhelmina-Gebergte (Suriname) in 1926". The grave was revisited in 2000 by descendant Herry Eilerts de Haan, in the company of, among others Michel Sinatra and Nico Pronk. This expedition was made into a documentary by National Geographic Channel called "Jungle Grave".
