= Corneliskondre =

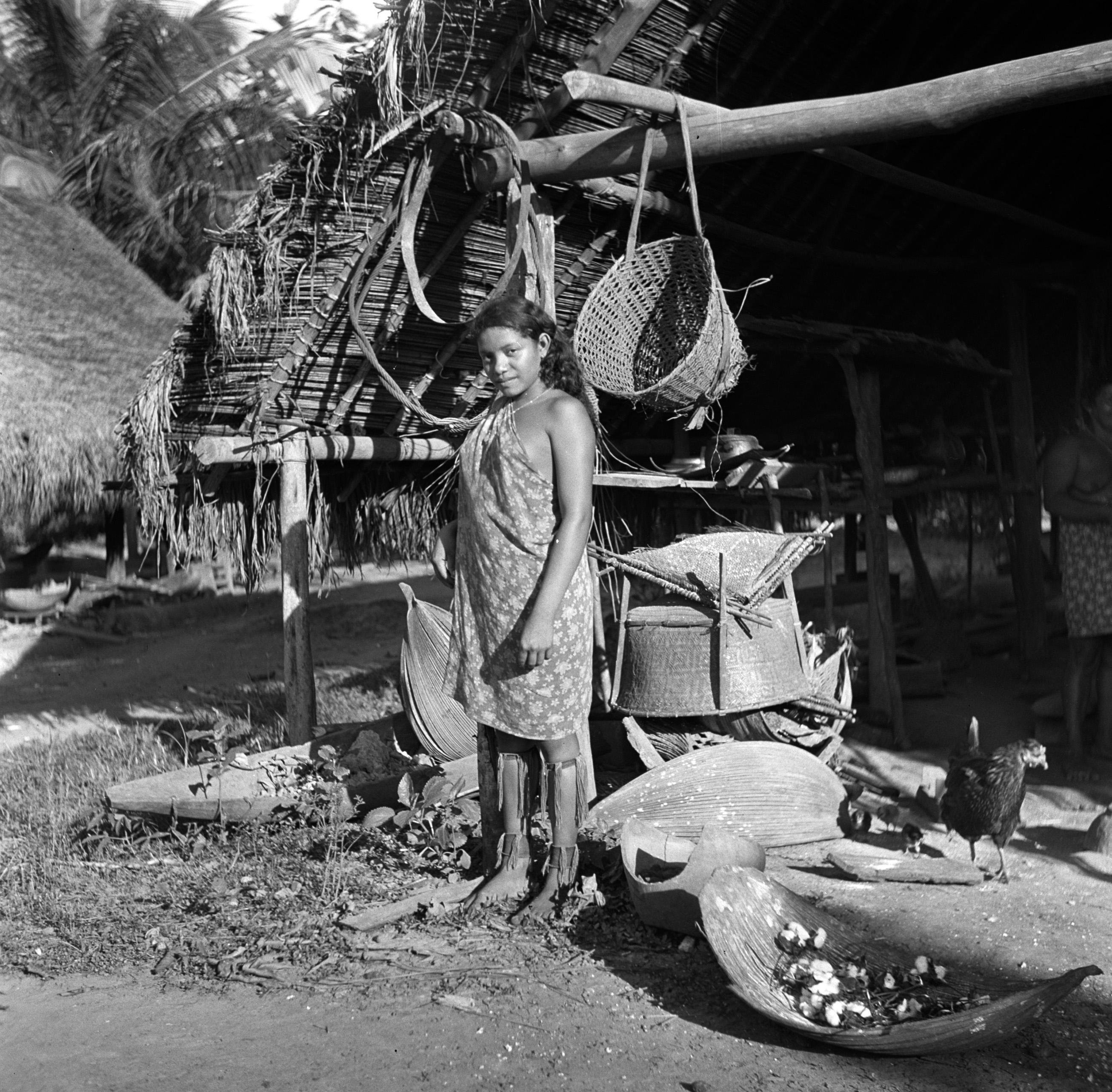
- Corneliskondre (1947)

- Location in Suriname
- Coordinates: 5°20′44″N 56°8′39″W
- Country: Suriname
- District: Sipaliwini District
- Resort (municipality): Boven Coppename

Government
  - Captain: Jules April

Population (2022)
  - Total: 75

Corneliskondre is a village in Suriname, located in the Boven Coppename resort of Sipaliwini District. It has a population of 70 as of 2020, and is inhabited by Indigenous people of the Kalina tribe.

Corneliskondre has been named after Cornelis Tapopi, the chief who founded the village. Catholic missionaries first visited the village in 1883.

The village has a school, and a holiday resort near the Wayambo River. The clinic in the village is operated by the Mungra Medical Centre in Nieuw-Nickerie.
