= Johannes King =

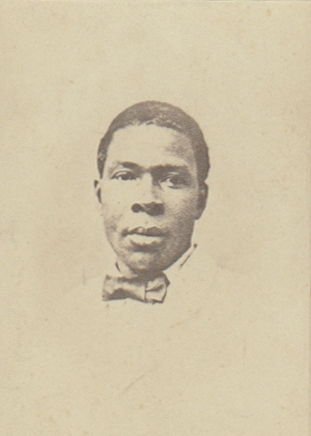
- Johannes King (~1870)
- Born: Adiri circa 1830 (Note: Johannes King was vague with dates and periods. His year of birth is generally believed to be 1830, but it could be as high as 1837) near plantation Haarlem and Maho, Kampong Baroe, Suriname
- Died: 24 October 1898 (aged 67–68); Maripaston, Bigi Poika, Suriname
- Occupations: writer, missionary

Johannes King (born: Adiri circa 1830 - 24 October 1898), was the first Maroon missionary, and the first important writer in Sranan Tongo. King belonged to the Matawai tribe, and performed his missionary activities for the Moravian Church.

== Biography ==
Adiri was born as a son of granman (paramount chief) Kodjo of the Matawai, near the plantations of Haarlem and Maho in Suriname. Adiri was born and raised in a completely illiterate society. In 1852, Adiri moved to Maripaston. During this period, he fell ill, and the illness lasted many years. In 1855, Adiri started to receive visions: a strange god pointed at an alien religion, told him to go to the city, and be baptized. Adiri went to Paramaribo, where he met van Calker, who was the preacher at the Moravian Church. He didn't stay long, and returned to his village soon after. Adiri returned in 1860, and had taught himself to read by then. He had used an A.B.C. (alphabet) book, and Singiboekoe, a book with psalms from the Moravian Church in Sranan Tongo. Once again he didn't stay long, but when he returned home, he started to build a church in Maripaston. In 1861, he returned to the city, was baptized, and changed his name to Johannes King.

=== Missionary ===
King first started to preach under his own people for which King was paid by the mission. King was briefly granman when his brother died, but opted to be solely a preacher. In 1864, he was sent to the Ndyuka for a dual purpose: The Moravian Church had up to then been unable to reach the Ndyuka, and the Matawai wanted to make a peace treaty with the Ndyuka. In 1864, King published a book about the visit in Sranan Tongo. The book is hard to read, because he uses an autodidactic spelling and often confuses a with h. (Note: In the Dutch orthography, the letter name for a is [aː] and the name for h is [ɦaː] which sound similar.) The original is archived by the Moravian Church in Zeist.

=== Author ===
During 1864 and 1865, King wrote and published over 1,000 pages on his visits to various tribes. His most important works are a 1868 book about the religions and customs of the Maroons, the 1886 Skrekiboekoe (book of horrors), which deals with his visions, and a 1886 history of the Maroons. King also wrote dresibuku, a medical book, but decided to keep it secret. The vast majority of his writings are archived by the Moravian Church in Zeist or Herrnhut.

== Legacy ==
On 29 May 1958, the Johannes King Hospital in Stoelmanseiland was named after Johannes King. In 1973, the dairies of Johannes King were published in Sranan Tongo as Life at Maripaston with summary in English by Henri Frans de Ziel.
