= Poesoegroenoe =

- Village
- Location in Suriname
- Coordinates: 4°23′45″N 55°47′15″W
- Country: Suriname
- District: Sipaliwini
- Resort: Boven Saramacca
- Time zone: UTC-3 (ART)

Poesoegroenoe or Pusugrunu or Psugrunu is a Matawai village in Boven Saramacca, Sipaliwini District, central Suriname. The village lies along the Saramacca River and is the residence of the gaanman of the Matawai maroons.

== Healthcare ==
Poesoegroenoe is home to a Medische Zending healthcare centre. The Pan American Health Organization noted that unlike many villages, Poesoegroenoe remained immune from malaria.

== Transportation ==
=== By road ===
A road connecting Poesoegroeni via Atjoni with Pokigron, where there is a connection to the North South Corridor, is currently under construction. According to Lesley Valentijn, the granman of the Matawi, the road should open to traffic in 2016. The road opened in 2017.

=== By air ===
Poesoegroenoe is served by the Poesoegroenoe Airstrip, offering scheduled services to and from Paramaribo.

=== By water ===
Villages on the Saramacca River are reachable by dugout canoes, which regularly travel the rivers.
