= Emma Range =

Mountain range in Suriname

- Location within Suriname

Highest point
- Elevation: 1,030 m (3,380 ft)
- Coordinates: 4°13′N 56°11′W

Geography
- Country: Suriname

The Emma Range (Dutch: Emmaketen) is a mountain range in the Sipaliwini District of Suriname. It is named after Emma of the Netherlands. Mountains on this range include the Hendriktop and Kleine Hendriktop. The range is located between the drainage basin of the Saramacca and the Coppename River. The range is about 30 km long, and has no significant human population.

The range is covered with a high dry land forest and mist forests at high altitudes. The vegetation is rich in ferns.
