= Eilerts de Haan Mountains =

Mountain range in Suriname

- Location within Suriname

Highest point
- Elevation: 956 m (3,136 ft)
- Coordinates: 3°N 56.166667°W

Geography
- Country: Suriname
- District: Sipaliwini District
- Borders on: Wilhelmina Mountains

The Eilerts de Haan Mountains (Dutch: Eilerts de Haangebergte) are a mountain range in Sipaliwini District, Suriname. It is a southern part of Wilhelmina Mountains and is maximum 986 m high. The mountain range is part of the Central Suriname Nature Reserve.

The first scientific expeditions were made in the early 20th century by cartographer Eilerts de Haan, who died of malaria in 1910 and is buried at the bottom of this mountain range.
