= Donderskamp =

Donderskamp Konomerume
- Village
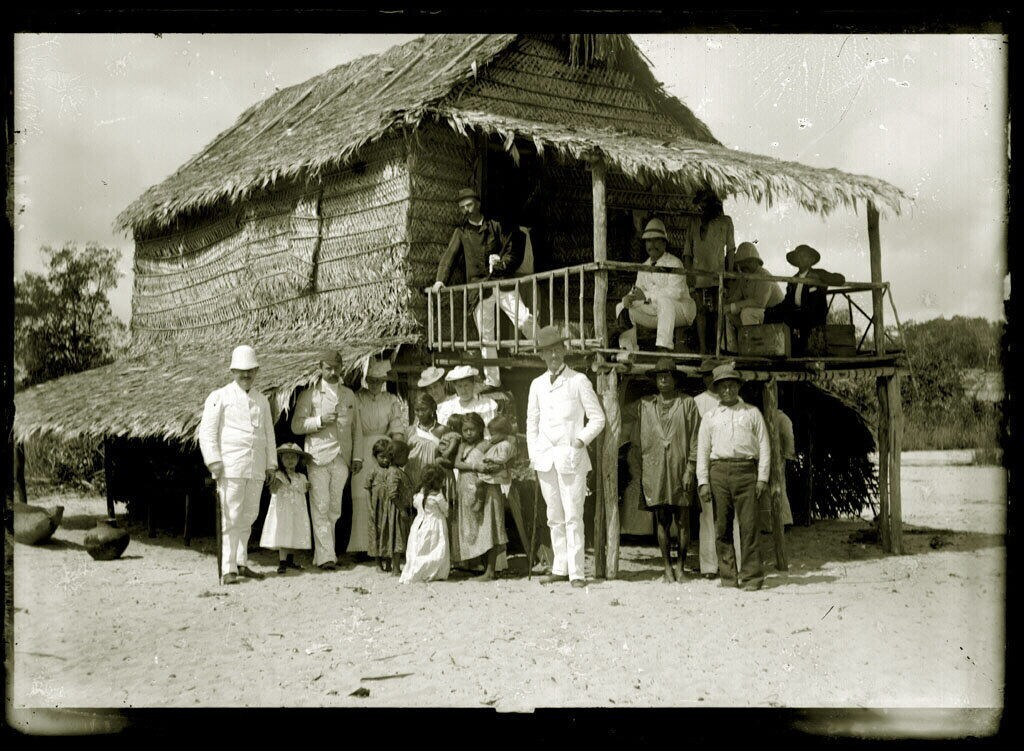
- Governor van Wijck visiting Donderskamp (1895)

- Location within Suriname
- Coordinates: 5.350833°N 56.365278°W
- Country: Suriname
- District: Sipaliwini District
- Resort: Boven Coppename

Government
  - Captain: Robertho Joghie

Population (2022)
  - Total: 350
- Time zone: UTC-3 (AST)

Donderskamp (Kalina: Konomerume) is an Indigenous village of Kalina Amerindians in the resort of Boven Coppename in the Sipaliwini District in Suriname. The village is located on the Wayambo River.

== History ==
The origin of the name is unclear. It may refer to Peter Donders who, in 1868, was the first missionary active among the Wayambo-indians, or it may simply refer to "thunder".

The village has a school, a clinic, and is home to a holiday resort. The main source of income for the village is growing arrowleaf elephant ear for pom, a popular dish in Suriname.

The Kalina language used to be spoken by the tribe, however as of 2014, it is only spoken by the elderly, and Sranan Tongo and Dutch have become the main languages.

== Transport ==
The village can be reached by boat from the Wayambo River, or by plane via the Donderskamp Airstrip.

== Bibliography ==
- Yamada, Racquel-María (2014). Mobilities into (and out of) Konomerume (Donderskamp). Caribbean Series. Vol. 34. ISBN 978-90-04-28012-0.
- Planning Office (2014). "Planning Office Suriname - Districts" (PDF). Planning Office Suriname (in Dutch).
