= Witagron =

Witagron Bitagron
- Location in Suriname
- Coordinates: 5°9′51″N 56°4′33″W
- Country: Suriname
- District: Sipaliwini District
- Resort (municipality): Boven Coppename

Witagron, formerly Bitagron, is a Kwinti village in Suriname on the Coppename River at the crossing of the Southern East-West Link from Paramaribo to Apoera in West-Suriname.

The name of the village means in Sranan Tongo 'Land of my forefathers'. Witagron is the residence of the Kwinti granman.

== History ==
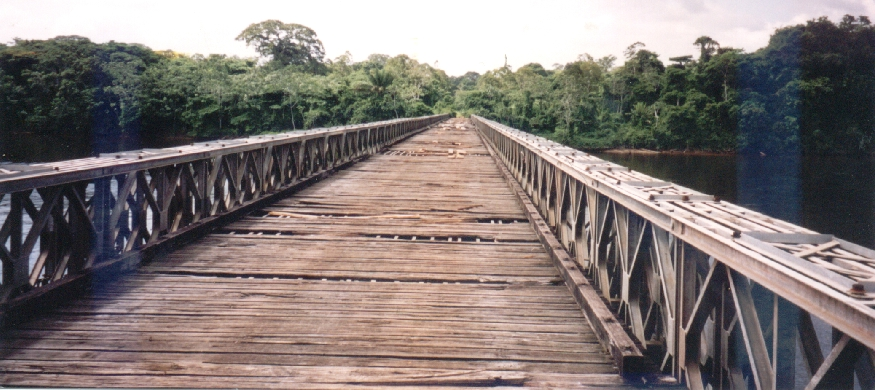
Bailey bridge over the Coppename river at Witagron

In 1975-76 a Bailey bridge was built across the river to replace the pontoon ferry.

In 1987, during the Surinamese Interior War, Witagron was partially destroyed. After the war, the village was rebuilt by the Stichting Wederopbouw Witagron with aid from the United Nations Development Program. The village is on an important location, because it is the gateway to Central Suriname Nature Reserve, and near the Raleigh Falls which are a major tourist attraction.

The bridge collapsed on Friday, October 10, after the last truck crossed it, without causing any casualties. The east-west inland connection is now permanently cut off.

== Healthcare ==
Witagron is home to a Medische Zending healthcare centre.
