= Wayambo River =

Bifurcating river in Suriname

Wayambo
- The Wayambo River connecting the Nickerie with the Coppename River

- Location within Suriname

Physical characteristics
- Source
  - location: Boven Wayambo
  - coordinates: 5.32285°N 56.39485°W
- Mouth
  - location: Nickerie and Coppename River
  - coordinates: 5.33611°N 56.45780°W 5.4330°N 56.0359°W

The Wayambo River (also: Wayombo) is a river of Suriname. The river is part of an inland waterway connecting the harbour of Nieuw-Nickerie with Paramaribo.

The river forms a natural bifurcation: at the source, the water can flow westwards to the Nickerie River and onwards to the Atlantic Ocean, or it can flow eastwards to the Coppename River, and then also onwards to the Atlantic Ocean. The Arawarasluis, a lock, has been constructed to increase the flow into Nickerie, which is used for irrigation of rice fields.

The indigenous villages of Corneliskondre and Donderskamp are located on the Wayambo River.
