= Nieuw Jacobkondre =

- Village
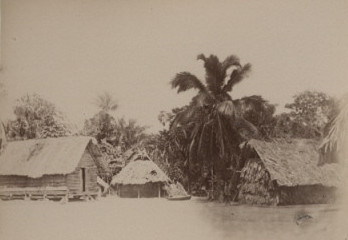
- Nieuw Jacobkondre (1890)

- Location in Suriname
- Coordinates: 4.93333°N 55.5333°W
- Country: Suriname
- District: Sipaliwini District
- Resort (municipality): Boven Saramacca

Nieuw Jacobkondre (also Njoeng Jacob Kondre or just Jacobkondre) is a town in the Sipaliwini District of Suriname. It is situated on the Saramacca River. The village is inhabited by Matawai people.

== Overview ==
The village of Jacobkondre was founded in the 1860s by Jacob Tooti. The original village was deserted around 1910, and a new settlement was built nearby.

The village has a school, clinic, and church. In 2014, a police station was opened in Nieuw Jacobkondre, because of increased crime at the nearby gold mines and the garimpero (illegal gold miner) village of Villa Brazil.

== Transport ==
Nieuw Jacobkondre can be reached via an unpaved road which connects to the Southern East-West Link and from there to the rest of the country. The Njoeng Jacob Kondre Airstrip also serves Nieuw Jacobkondre.

== Bibliography ==
- Beet, Chris de (1981). People in between: the Matawai Maroons of Suriname (PDF). Krips Repro, Meppel – via Digital Library for Dutch Literature.
