= Hendriktop =

Mountain in Sipaliwini District, Suriname

- Location within Suriname

Highest point
- Elevation: 908 m (2,979 ft)
- Coordinates: 4°11′40″N 56°11′46″W

Geography
- Location: Sipaliwini District, Suriname
- Parent range: Emma Range

Hendriktop is a mountain in Suriname at 908 metres (2,979 ft). It is part of the Emma Range and is located in the Sipaliwini District. The mountain is named after Hendrik of the Netherlands. The mountain was first climbed by A. van Stockum in 1902.
