= Van Asch Van Wijck Mountains =

Mountain range in Suriname

- Location within Suriname

Highest point
- Elevation: 277 m (909 ft)
- Coordinates: 4°20′N 55°40′W

Geography
- Country: Suriname

The Van Asch Van Wijck Mountains ((in Dutch) Van Asch van Wijckgebergte) are a mountain range in Suriname. They are named after Titus van Asch van Wijck, a governor of Suriname. The highest mountain is the 721 metre Ebbatop
