= Warnakomoponafaja =

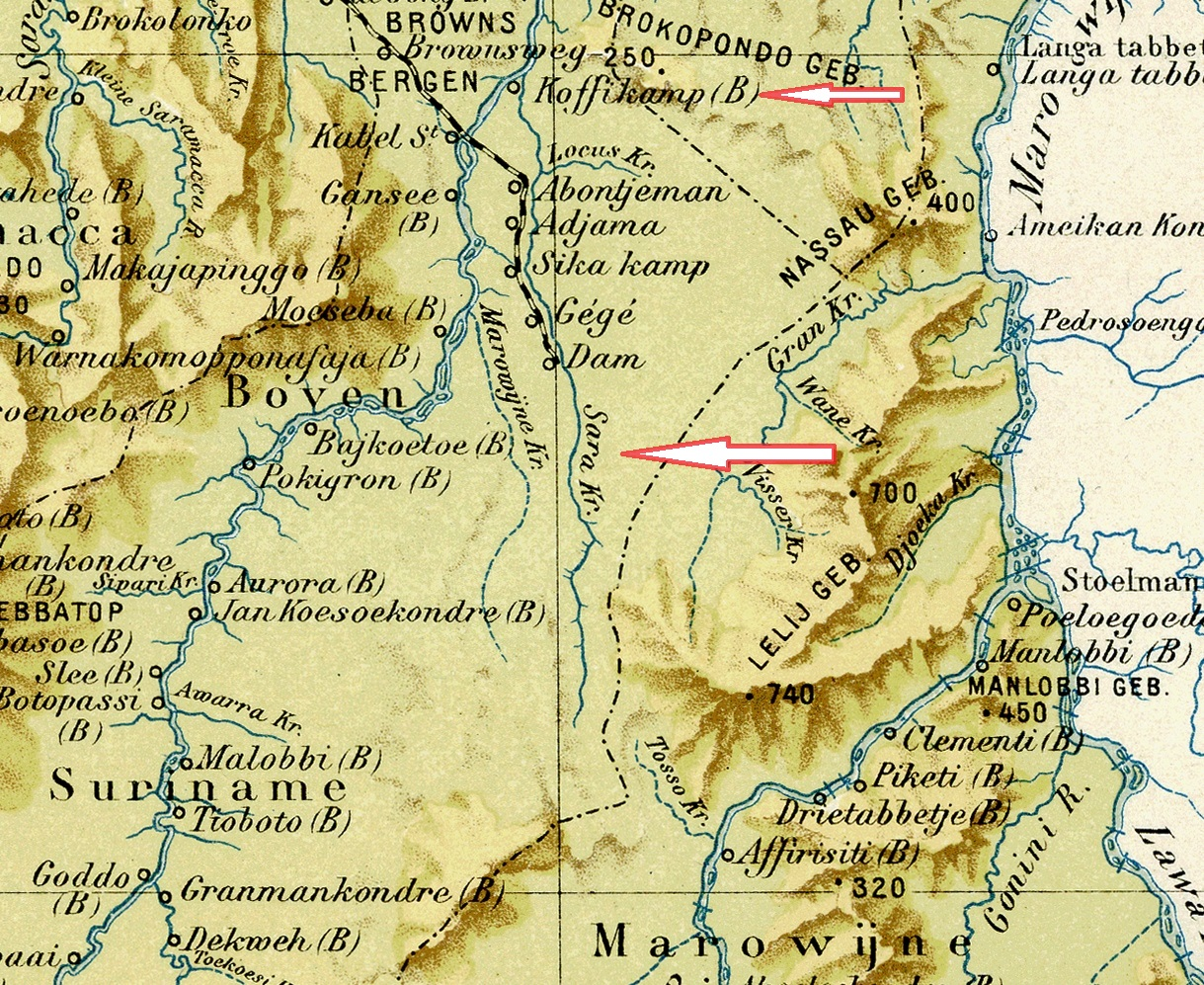
- Warnakomoponafaja (far left) on a 1917 map

- Location in Suriname
- Coordinates: 4°40′21″N 55°34′48″W
- Country: Suriname
- District: Sipaliwini District
- Resort (municipality): Boven Saramacca
- Elevation: 246 ft (75 m)
- Time zone: UTC-3

Warnakomoponafaja is a village in Boven Saramacca municipality (resort) in Sipaliwini District in Suriname.

The name of the village means "the hare who arrived from the fire". When the village was founded, a fire was made near the hole of a hare, and suddenly the hare escaped through the flames. The estimated population of the village in 1904 was about 80 people, and there were many fruit trees in the village. As of 2014, the village is not listed on the settlements in Boven Saramacca, and has probably been abandoned.

Nearby towns and villages include Makajapingo (2.0 nm), Tabrikiekondre (5.1 nm), La Valere (16.6 nm), Baikutu (17.4 nm), Stonkoe (1.4 nm) and Mofina (1.0 nm).
