= Makajapingo =

- Location in Suriname
- Coordinates: 4°43′9″N 55°33′6″W
- Country: Suriname
- District: Sipaliwini District
- Resort (municipality): Boven Saramacca
- Elevation: 207 ft (63 m)
- Time zone: UTC-3

Makajapingo is a village in Boven Saramacca (resort) in Sipaliwini District in Suriname. The village is inhabited by Matawai people.

Nearby towns and villages include Pakka-Pakka (8.6 nm), Moetoetoetabriki (7.0 nm), Tabrikiekondre (3.2 nm), Stonkoe (3.2 nm) and Warnakomoponafaja (2.0 nm).

The villages does not have a school or a clinic, but does have a church, and unlike most Matawai settlements, it is Catholic.
