= Tabrikiekondre =

- Location in Suriname
- Coordinates: 4°45′53″N 55°33′6″W
- Country: Suriname
- District: Sipaliwini District
- Resort (municipality): Boven Saramacca
- Elevation: 246 ft (75 m)
- Time zone: UTC -3

Tabrikiekondre is a village in Boven Saramacca municipality (resort) in Sipaliwini District in Suriname.

Nearby towns and villages include Moetoetoetabriki (4.1 nm), Kwattahede (3.0 nm), La Valere (13.6 nm), Warnakomoponafaja (5.1 nm) and Makajapingo (3.2 nm).
