= Ebbatop =

Mountain in Sipaliwini District, Suriname

- Location within Suriname

Highest point
- Elevation: 721 m (2,365 ft)
- Coordinates: 4°21′17″N 55°40′2″W

Geography
- Location: Sipaliwini District, Suriname
- Parent range: Van Asch Van Wijck Mountains

The Ebbatop is the best-known mountain of the Van Asch Van Wijck Mountains situated in the Suriname Sipaliwini district. The Van Asch van Wijck mountain range consists of a series of free-standing mountains dotted throughout a terrain. The highest peaks are roughly 500 to 700 meters (1,600 to 2,300 ft) high, Ebbatop being the most northern at 721 meters (2,365 ft) high.
