= Coppename River =

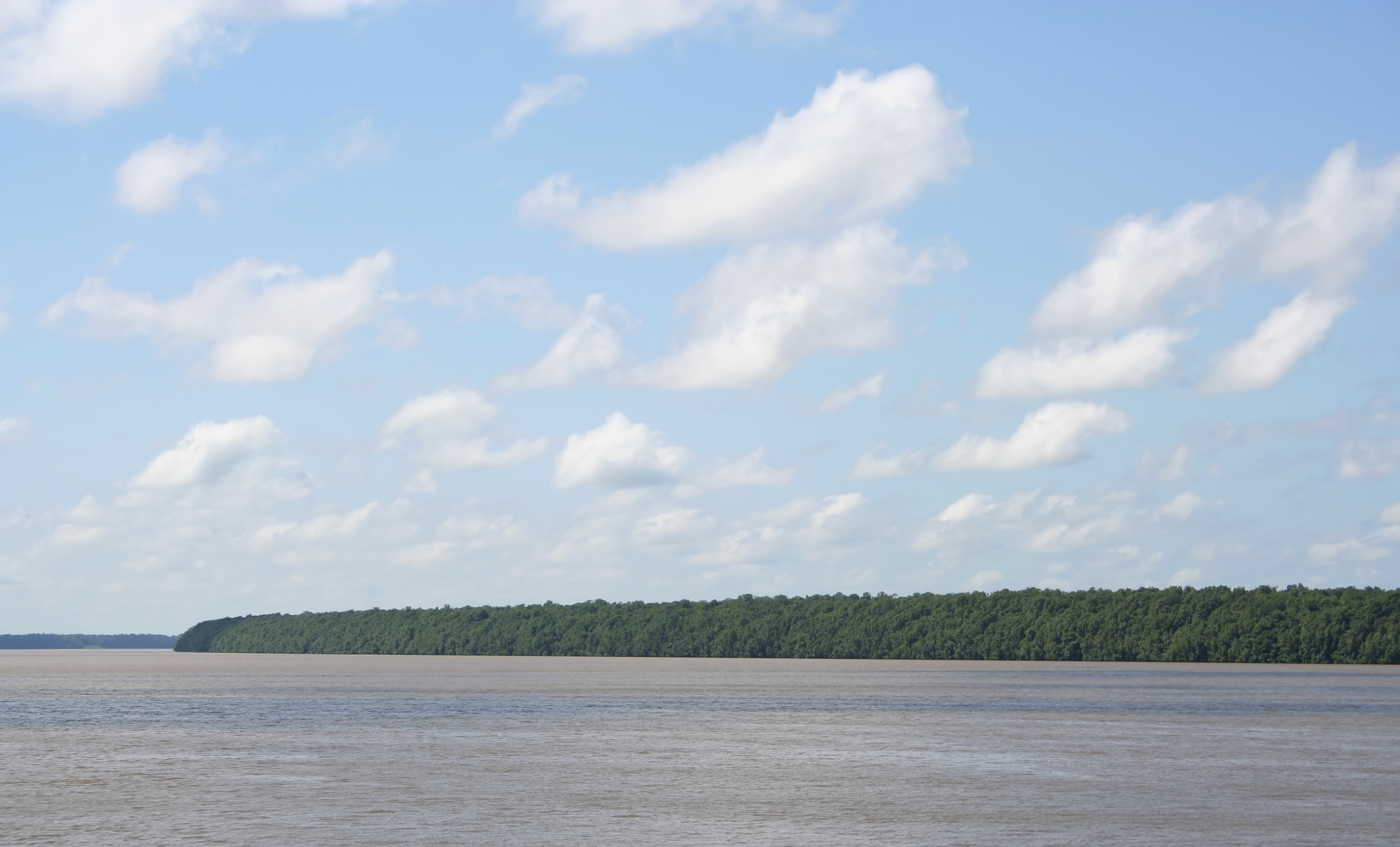
- Coppename River

- Location within Suriname

Location
- Country: Suriname
- District: Coronie & Saramacca District

Physical characteristics
- Source
  - location: Wilhelmina Mountains
- Mouth: confluence Saramacca River
  - coordinates: 5.8321°N 55.9448°W

Basin features
- Progression: Atlantic Ocean

The Coppename is a river in Suriname (South America) in the district of Sipaliwini, forming part of the boundary between the districts of Coronie and Saramacca.

== Course ==
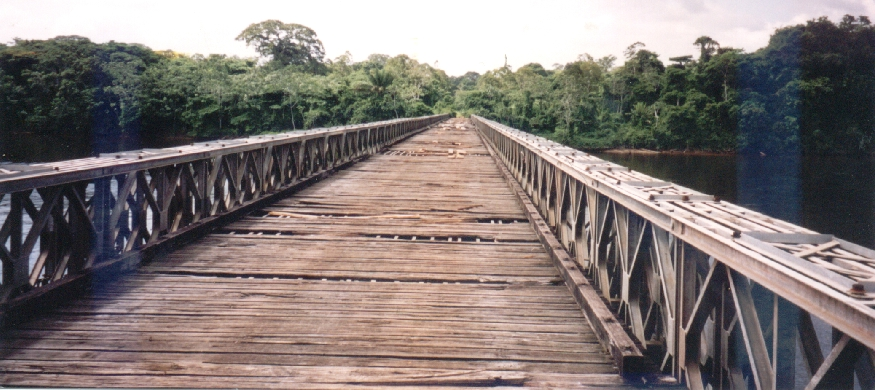
Bailey bridge over the Coppename river at Bitagron

The Coppename river begins in the Wilhelmina Mountains. Its tributaries are the Right Coppename (which originates on the northeast slope of the Wilhelmina range, Tafelberg, and the western parts of the Emmaketen), the Left Coppename, and the middle Coppename, which has its sources in the western and central parts of the north side of the Wilhelmina mountains and from the south east region of the Bakhuys Mountains.

The three branches of the Coppename unite above the Tonckens Falls and then flows past Hebiweri Mountain. Below the Sidonkrutu-rapids it joins with the Adampada, which drains most of the eastern slope of the Bakhuys range. Below the Langa rapids, the river bends to the east and above the Raleigh Falls is joined by the Tangimama, which rises in the northern foothills of the Emmaketen.

The Raleigh Falls, together with the nearby Voltz Mountain and the Van Stockum range, are a tourist attraction, which can be reached by a small airplanes.

After being joined by the Kwama, the Coppename flows further north and passes the Maroon villages of Kaaimanston, Bitagron and Heidoti. Once in the old coastal plain, the Coppename is joined by the Wayambo River, which forms a bifurcation between the Coppename and the Nickerie Rivers.

Finally, the tributaries, the Tibiti and Coesewijne join it. The Coppename and Saramacca Rivers unite and flow together into the Atlantic.

== See also ==
- Coppename Bridge
