= Saramaccan language =

Creole language of Suriname and French Guiana

Saramaccan
- Saamakatöngö
- Native to: Suriname, French Guiana
- Ethnicity: Saramaka
- Native speakers: 90,000 (2013)
- Language family: English–Portuguese-African Creole: Guinea Coast Creole English; Surinamese Creole English; Saramaccan
- Dialects: Matawai (Matawari)

Language codes
- ISO 639-3: srm
- Glottolog: sara1340
- Linguasphere: 52-ABB-ax

Saramaccan (Saamakatöngö; Eastern Maroon Creole: Saamakatongo) is a creole language spoken by about 58,000 people of West African descent near the Saramacca and the upper Suriname River, as well as in Paramaribo, capital of Suriname (formerly also known as Dutch Guiana). The language also has 25,000 speakers in French Guiana and 8,000 in the Netherlands. It has three main dialects. The speakers are mostly descendants of fugitive slaves who were native to West and Central Africa; they form a group called Saamacca, also spelled Saramaka.

Linguists consider Saramaccan notable because its vocabulary is based on two European source languages, English (30%) and Portuguese (20%), and various West and Central African languages (50%), but it diverges considerably from all of them. The African component accounts for about 50% once ritual use is taken into account, the highest percentage in the Americas. When ritual use is excluded, 35% English-derived, 25% Portuguese-derived, with 35% derived from one or another African language. It is derived from Niger–Congo languages of West Africa, especially Fon and other Gbe languages, as well as Akan and Central African languages such as Kikongo.

== Origins ==
The language is derived from Plantation Creole, which is nowadays known as Sranan Tongo, but the branches diverged around 1690 and evolved separately. The Saramaccan lexicon is largely drawn from English, Portuguese, and, to a lesser extent, Dutch, among European languages, and Niger–Congo languages of West Africa, especially Fon and other Gbe languages, Akan, and Central African languages, such as KiKongo. The African component accounts for about 50% of the total.

Saramaccan phonology has traits similar to languages of West Africa. It has developed the use of tones, which are common in Africa, rather than stress, which is typical of European languages.

Over a fourth of words are from English. It is generally agreed that the Portuguese influence originated from enslaved peoples who lived on plantations with Portuguese masters and possibly with other slaves who spoke a Portuguese creole. The masters might have brought the latter in migrating to Suriname from Brazil. Saramaccan originators began with an early form of Sranan Tongo, an English-based creole, and transformed it into a new creole via the Portuguese influx, combined with influence from the grammars of Fongbe and other Gbe languages.

== Dialects ==
Saramaccan is divided into two main dialects. The Upper Suriname River dialect and the Lower Suriname River dialect are both spoken by members of the Saramaka people, and by the Surinamese people who are living in the 12 English-speaking Caribbean nations of which all 12 have a foreign relationship with the Republic of Suriname: Antigua and Barbuda, Bahamas, Barbados, Belize, Dominica, Grenada, Guyana, Jamaica, Saint Kitts and Nevis, Saint Lucia, Saint Vincent and the Grenadines and Trinidad and Tobago.

== Matawai ==
The Matawai tribe has its own language, which is related to the Saramaka language. The language is derived from Plantation Creole, which is nowadays known as Sranan Tongo. However, the branches diverged around 1700 and evolved separately. Matawai is spoken in the villages in Kwakoegron and Boven Saramacca. However, code-switching with Sranan Tongo, other Maroon languages, and Dutch is common. The language is considered endangered.

== Phonology ==
=== Vowels ===
	Front	Back
Close	i	u
Close-mid	e	o
Open-mid	ɛ	ɔ
Open	a	

Each oral vowel also has a corresponding nasal vowel. There are also three vowel lengths: /bɛ/ "red", /bɛ́ɛ/ "belly," /bɛɛ́ɛ/ "bread."

=== Consonants ===
		Labial		Dental/ Alveolar		Palatal		Velar			
		Labial		Dental/ Alveolar		Palatal		plain		Labial	
Nasal		m		n		ɲ					
Plosive	plain	p	b	t	d	c	ɟ	k	ɡ	k͡p	ɡ͡b
Plosive	prenasalized		ᵐb		ⁿd		ᶮɟ		ᵑɡ		
Implosive			ɓ		ɗ						
Fricative		f	v	s	z	ç					
Approximant				l		j				w	

/c, ɟ, ɲ, ᶮɟ/ are more specifically dorso-postalveolar, but the palatal fricative /ç/ is dorso-palatal.

=== Tone ===
The language has two surface tones: high and low. Stress in European words is replaced by high tone in Saramaccan.

== Orthography ==
=== Vowels ===
Letter	Pronunciation
a	[a]
e	[e]
ë	[ɛ]
i	[i]
o	[o]
ö	[ɔ]
u	[u]

Long and overlong vowels are written as doubled or tripled respectively.

=== Consonants ===
Letter	Pronunciation
b	[b]
d	[d]
dj	[ɟ]
g	[g]
gb	[ɡ͡b]
h	[h]
j	[j]
k	[k]
kp	[k͡p]
l	[l]
m	[m]
mb	[mb]
n	[n]
nd	[nd]
nj	[ɲ]
p	[p]
s	[s]
t	[t]
tj	[ç], [c]?
v	[v]
w	[w]

== Lexicon ==
Saramaccan's vocabulary is 30% derived from English, 20% from Portuguese. It is one of the few known creoles to derive a large percentage of its lexicon from more than one source (most creoles have one main lexifier language). Also, it is said to be both an English-based creole and a Portuguese-based creole.

About 50% of the vocabulary of Saramaccan is of African origin, the largest percentage of any creole in the Americas. Source languages for these words include Kikongo, Gbe languages, and Twi.

== Examples ==
To English-speakers who are not familiar with it, Saramaccan's English basis is almost unrecognizable. Here are some examples of Saramaccan sentences that are taken from the SIL dictionary:

De waka te de aan sinkii möön.
"They walked until they were worn out."

U ta mindi kanda fu dee soni dee ta pasa ku u.
"We make up songs about things that happen to us."

A suku di soni te wojo fëën ko bëë.
"He searched for it in vain."

Mi puu tu dusu kölu bai ën.
"I paid two thousand guilders to buy it."

Examples of words originally from Portuguese or a Portuguese creole are mujee (mulher) "woman", womi (o homem) "man", da (dar) "to give", bunu (bom) "good", kaba (acabar) "to end", ku (com) "with", kuma (como, cf. vernacular Brazilian cuma? for como é?, "come again?") "as, like", faka (faca) "knife", aki (aqui) "here", ma (mas) "but", kendi (quente) "hot", liba (riba) "above", and lio (rio) "river".

== Literature ==
Saramaccan has a rich history of published works, including the following dictionaries: Christian Schumann's 1778, Saramaccanisch Deutsches Worter-Buch, Johannes Riemer's 1779 Wörterbuch zur Erlernung der Saramakka-Neger-Sprache, a copied and edited version of Schumann, Jan Voorhoeve and Antoon Donicie's 1963 wordlist, De Saramakaanse Woordenschat, Antoon de Groot's, Woordregister Nederlands- Saramakaans met context en idioom (1977) and his Woordregister Saramakaans-Nederlands (1981), and Glock (ed) Holansi-Saamaka wöutubuku (Nederlands-Saramaccaans woordenboek)

The Instituut voor Taalwetenschap has published tens of literacy books and collections of folktales written by Saramaccans and a complete translation of the New Testament. Two books written by Richard Price have now been published in Saamakatongo: Fesiten and Boo go a Kontukonde. The Saramaccan orthography created by the Summer Institute of Linguistics is not in universal use. Linguist Vinije Haabo is developing a Saramaccan dictionary based on an improved orthography, which he intends to publish online. Alison Hinds of Barbados sang her up-tempo soca song "Faluma" in the language

== Sources ==
- Bakker, Peter; Smith, Norval; Veenstra, Tonjes (1994). "Saramaccan". In Arends, Jacque; Muysken, Pieter; Smith, Norval (eds.). Pidgins and Creoles. Amsterdam: John Benjamins. pp. 165–178.
- Borges, Robert (2014). The Life of Language: Dynamics of Language Contact in Suriname (PDF) (Doctoral thesis). Radboud University Nijmegen.
- Migge, Bettina (2017). Putting Matawai on the Surinamese Linguistic Map. John Benjamins Publishing – via Hyper Articles en Ligne.
- McWhorter, John H.; Good, Jeff (2012). A Grammar of Saramaccan Creole. Berlin: De Gruyter Mouton. ISBN 978-3-11-027826-2.
- Muysken, Pieter; Smith, Norval, eds. (2015). Surviving the Middle Passage: The West Africa-Surinam Sprachbund. Berlin: Walter de Gruyter. ISBN 978-3-11-039499-3.
- Price, Richard (2007). Travels with Tooy: History, Memory, and the African American Imagination. Chicago: University of Chicago Press. ISBN 978-0-226-68059-0.
