= Boven Saramacca =

Coordinates: 4°14′N 55°27′W

- Resort
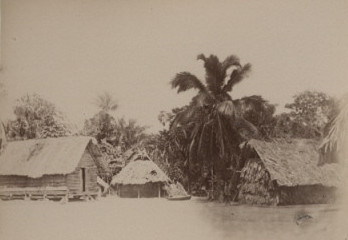
- Nieuw Jacobkondre (1890)

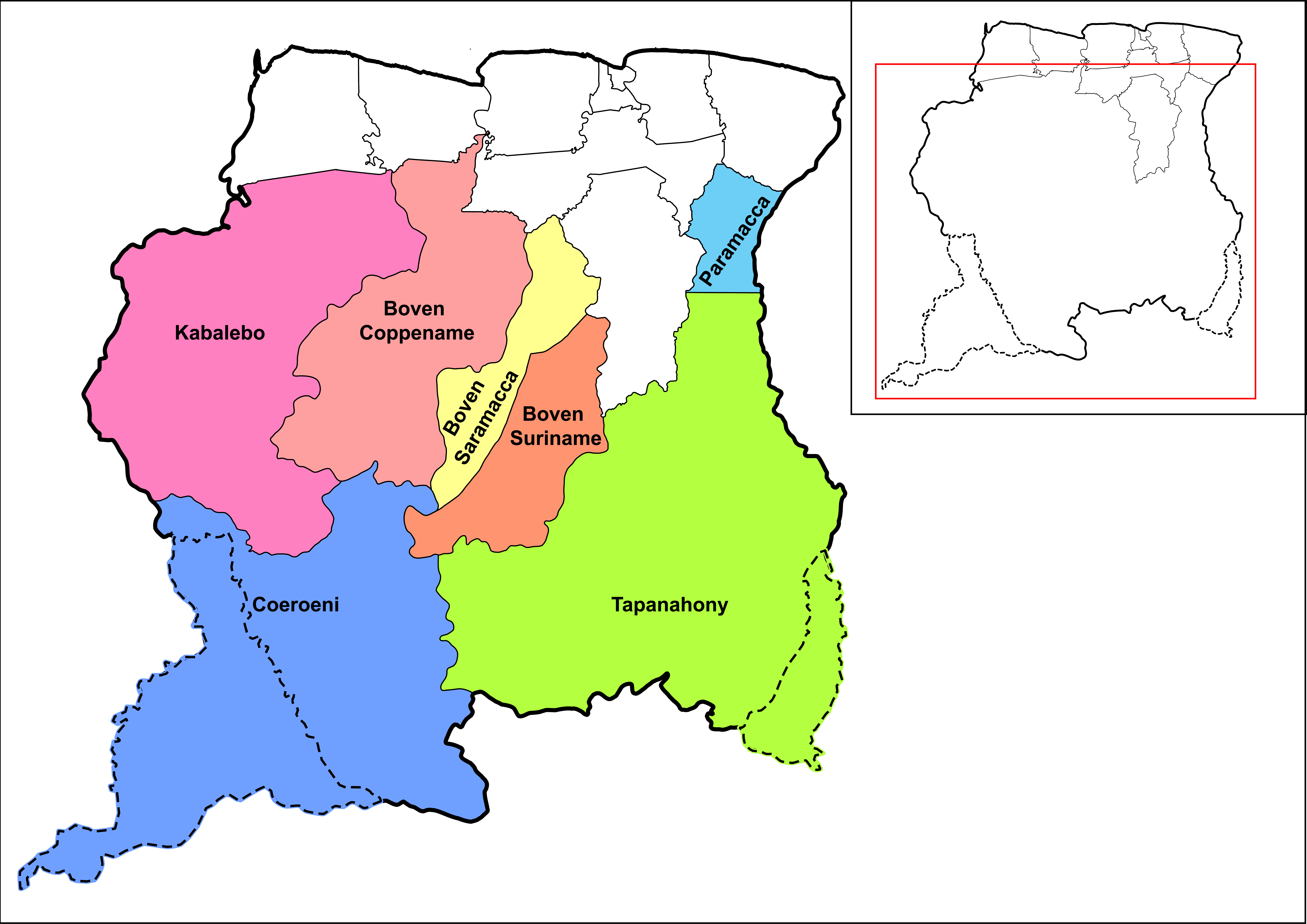
- Map showing the resorts of Sipaliwini District. Boven Saramacca
- Country: Suriname
- District: Sipaliwini District

Area
  - Total: 5,929 km^{2} (2,289 sq mi)

Population (2012)
  - Total: 1,427
  - Density: 0.2407/km^{2} (0.6234/sq mi)
- Time zone: UTC-3 (AST)

Boven Saramacca is a resort in Suriname, located in the Sipaliwini District. Its population at the 2012 census was 1,427. The dominant geographical feature of this resort is the Saramacca River. The resort is mainly inhabited by Maroons of the Matawai tribe.

The main village is Nieuw Jacobkondre which can be reached via an unpaved which connects to the Southern East-West Link and from there to the rest of the country. The Njoeng Jacob Kondre Airstrip also serves Nieuw Jacobkondre. Poesoegroenoe is home to the granman of the Matawai.

== Other villages ==
- Boslanti
- Heidoti
- Kwattahede
- Makajapingo
- Moetoetoetabriki
- Pakka-Pakka
- Tabrikiekondre
- Villa Brazil
- Warnakomoponafaja
