= Julianatop =

Mountain in Suriname

- Location within Suriname

Highest point
- Elevation: 1,280 m (4,200 ft)
- Listing: Country high point
- Coordinates: 3°40′58″N 56°32′8″W

Geography
- Location: Sipaliwini District, Suriname
- Parent range: Wilhelmina Mountains

Julianatop (Dutch pronunciation: [jyliˈjaːnaːˌtɔp]) is the highest mountain in Suriname at 1,280 metres (4,199 ft). It is located in the Sipaliwini District. The mountain is named after Juliana of the Netherlands. The Amerindian name of the mountain is Ipinumin (He who stands alone).

The Julianatop is located in the Central Suriname Nature Reserve.[2]

The summit was reached for the first time in 1963 by an expedition consisting of Mr. A.P.L. Nunes (GMD - Geologisch Mijnbouwkundige dienst) J.P. Schulz and J. Tawjoeran (both from LBB - Lands Bosbeheer), and S. Ligori from the Suriname Museum. The indigenous expedition member John Tawjoeran hoisted the Surinamese flag (the flag with five stars) in a tree.

The expedition arrived at the Kayser Mountains airstrip on June 29, 1963. From there, they followed the Zuid River by korjaal Surinamese canoe) to its confluence with the Lucie River, which they then followed upstream for approximately 15 km to where the Lucie River meets the Oost River. The base camp was established here. From this base camp, a trail was cleared heading northwest toward Julianatop (Juliana summit); at km 14, the trail turned northeast, and at km 19, it turned north. From that point, a 3.5 km long side path was cut in an easterly direction. Small camps were set up at km 9, 14, 19, 21, and halfway along the eastern track.

The expedition to Julianatop was an extension of the June, July, and August 1963 expedition to the Wilhelmina Mountains, led by Dr. Bassett Maguire, Dr. Howard Irwin, Dr. Tom Soderstrom, and Noel Holmgren, all from the NYBG (New York Botanical Gardens), along with G. Wessels-Boer, J. Elburg, Boy Jopoi, and H.P. Pijpers (Radio communications) on behalf of the LBB, to conduct botanical research and collect plant samples.
