= Heidoti =

- Location in Suriname
- Coordinates: 4°52′15″N 55°34′12″W
- Country: Suriname
- District: Sipaliwini District
- Resort (municipality): Boven Saramacca
- Elevation: 66 ft (20 m)
- Time zone: UTC-3

Heidoti is a village in Boven Saramacca municipality (resort) in Sipaliwini District in Suriname. Heidoti is home to Maroons of the Kwinti tribe.

Heidoti had been built as a camp by the Geological and Mining Services, and was later settled by Nicodemus, who moved his family into the hamlet. In 1915, Nicodemus was appointed village chief. Since 2009, Heidoti is home to the Heidoti Tropical Park.

Heidoti can be reached by boat from Nieuw Jacobkondre, which has road access to the rest of the country, or from the Cabana Airstrip. In November 2019, IAMGOLD finished a road to the Saramacca Development Project in Cabana giving Heidoti direct access to the rest of the country.

== Bibliography ==
- Beet, Chris de (1981). "People in between: the Matawai Maroons of Suriname". Digital Library for Dutch Literature (in Dutch).
- Elst, Dirk van der (1973). "The Coppename Kwinti: Notes on an Afro-American tribe in Suriname". Nieuwe West-Indische Gids - Year 15. University of Florida.
