= Kwakoegron =

- Resort
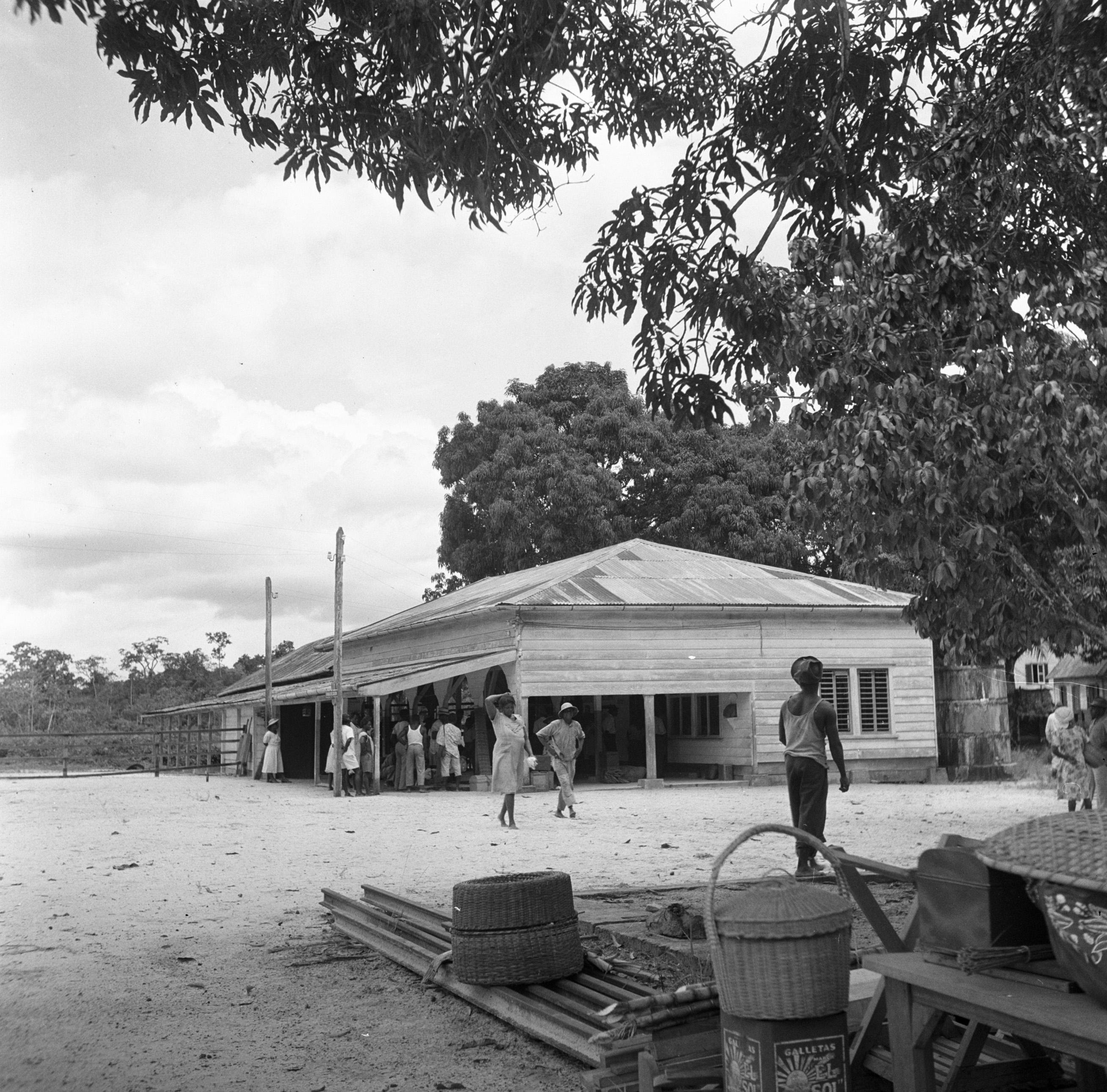
- Former train station of Kwakoegron (1947)

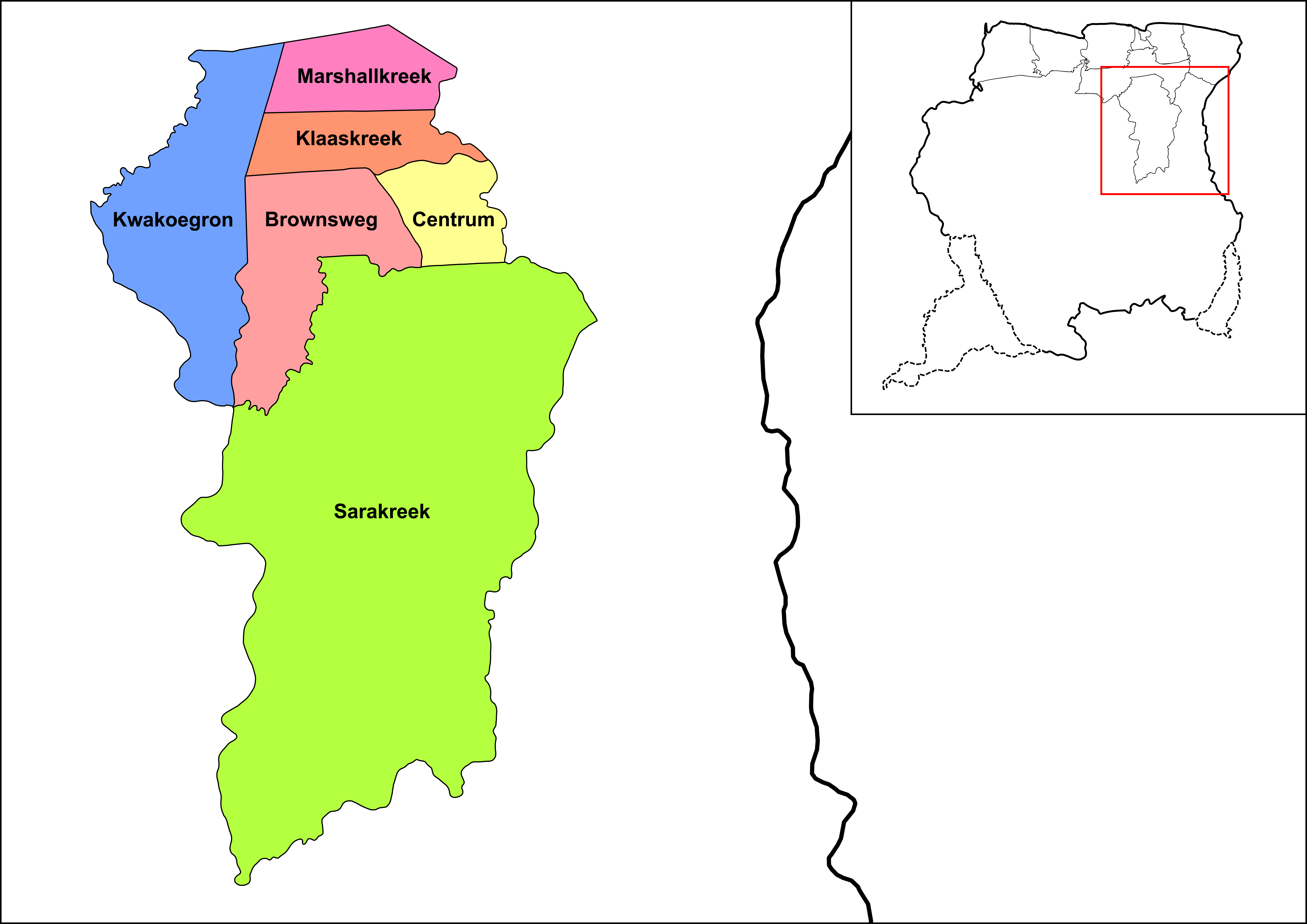
- Map showing the resorts of Brokopondo District. Kwakoegron
- Coordinates: 5°14′53″N 55°20′41″W
- Country: Suriname
- District: Brokopondo

Area
  - Total: 1,050 km^{2} (410 sq mi)

Population (1 January 2012)
  - Total: 263
  - Density: 0.250/km^{2} (0.649/sq mi)
- Time zone: UTC-3 (AST)

Kwakoegron (land of Kwakoe) is a town and resort in Suriname. It is located inland, due south of Paramaribo. According to the 2012 census it has a population of 263, and is mainly inhabited by maroons, of the Matawai people. The resort and town are named after Kwakoe, the native word for Wednesday, and grond, the Dutch word for ground. The captain of the resort resides in the village Commisariskondre.

== Overview ==
Kwakoegron has a school, a clinic, and a holiday resort. The resort can be accessed via a paved side road of the Southern East-West Link. In 1910, Kwakoegron was connected to the Lawa Railway which closed in 1987.

The Brinckheuvel Nature Reserve is located near the village.

== See also ==
- Akan names
