= Saramacca River =

River in Suriname

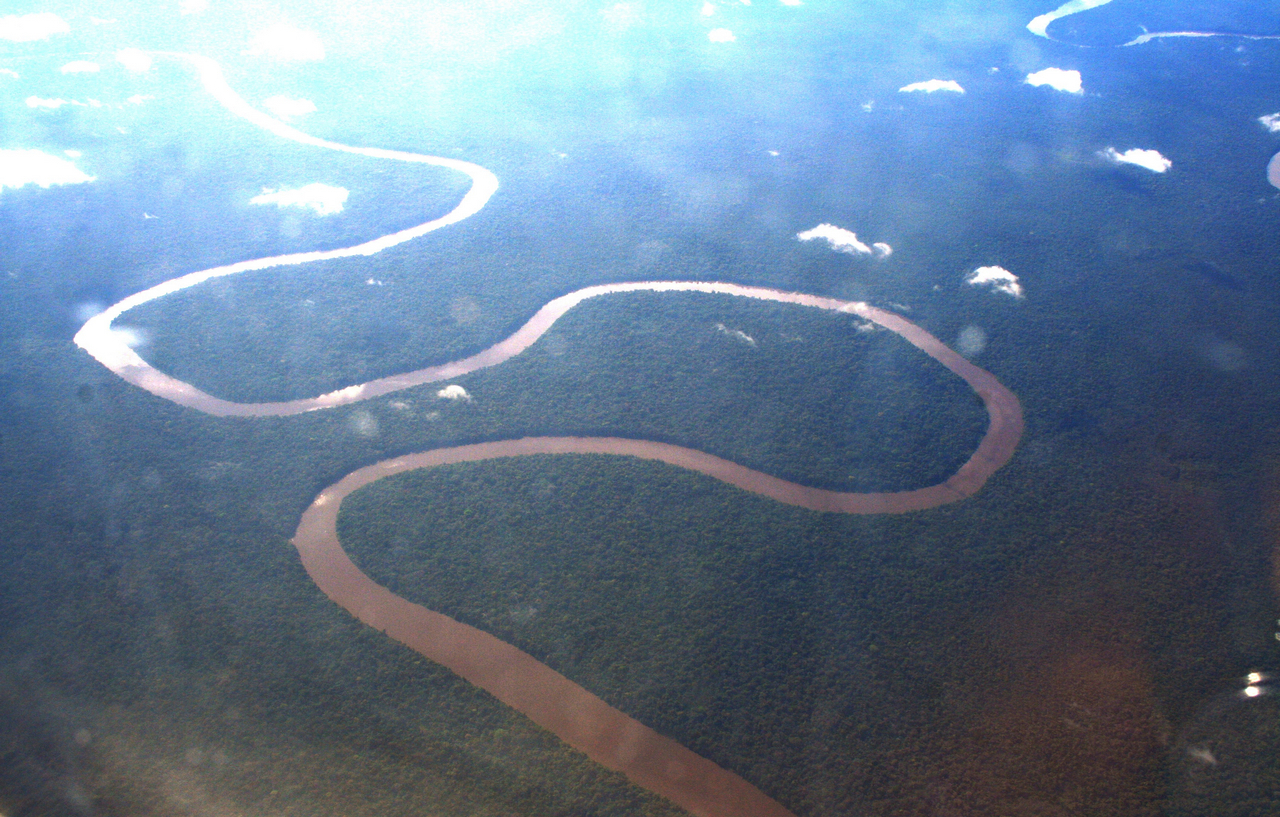
- Aerial view of meandering Saramacca River

- Location within Suriname

Location
- Country: Suriname
- District: Saramacca & Sipaliwini District

Physical characteristics
- Source
  - location: Wilhelmina Mountains
  - coordinates: 3.7510°N 56.1175°W
- Mouth: Coppename River
  - coordinates: 5.8319°N 55.9177°W

Basin features
- Progression: Coppename River→Atlantic Ocean

Saramacca River is a river in Suriname. The Lokono named this river "Surama", and today's name "Saramacca" is probably derived from it. It originates in the Wilhelmina Mountains and flows northwards and enters the Atlantic Ocean together with the Coppename River. It has a river basin of 9.400 km^{2} and length of 255 km. The Saramacca River is used for water transport. Scientific exploration of the river began in the 1770s.
