= Pico 31 de Março =

Mountain on the Brazil-Venezuela border

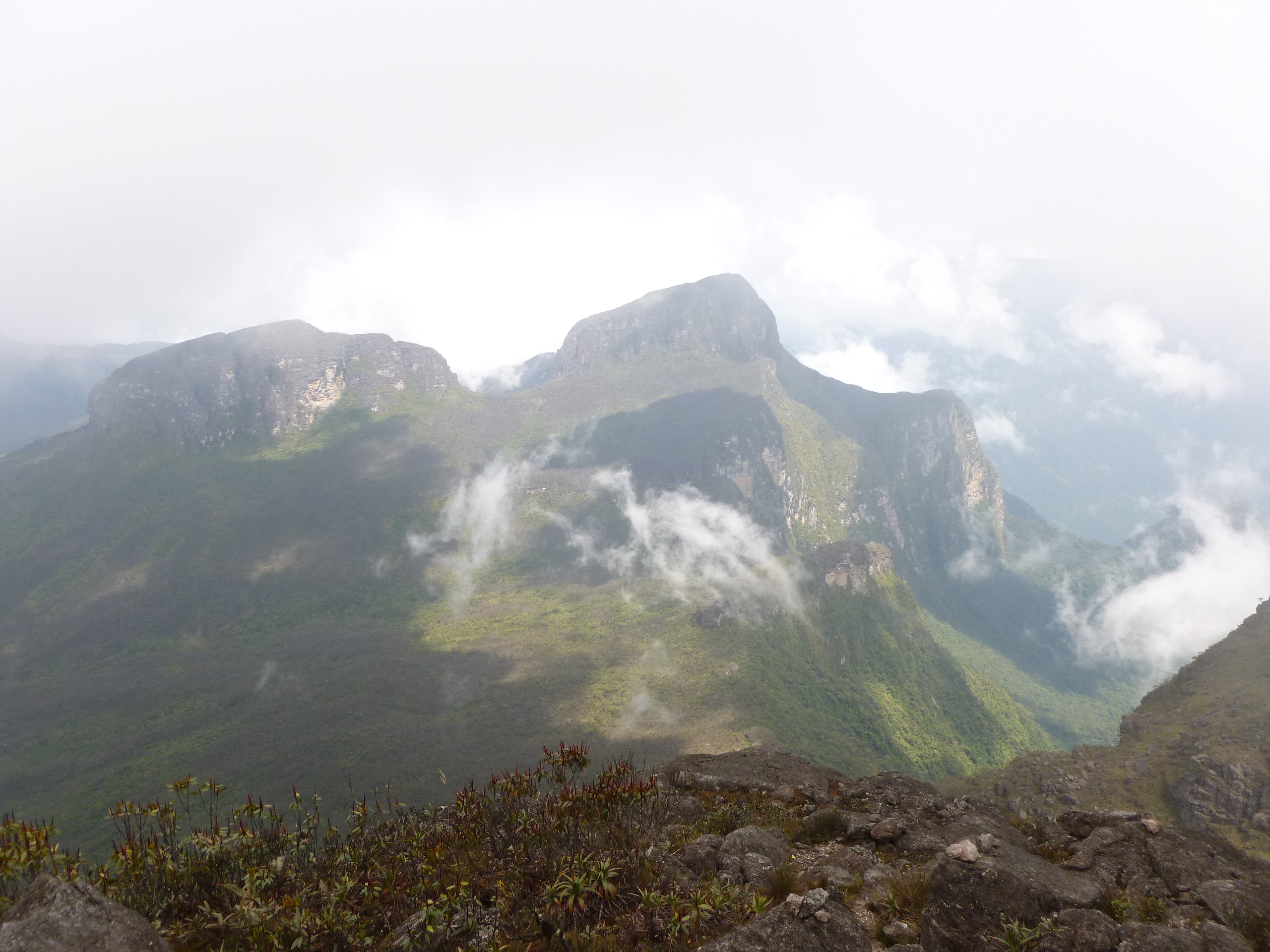
- Pico 31 de Março or Pico Phelps, on the border of Brazil and Venezuela.

Highest point
- Elevation: 2,974.18 m (9,757.8 ft)
- Parent peak: Pico da Neblina
- Coordinates: 0°48′N 66°00′W

Geography
- Location within Brazil
- Location: Brazil / Venezuela
- Parent range: Cerro de la Neblina (Portuguese: Serra da Neblina), a section of Serra do Imeri in the Guiana Highlands

Climbing
- First ascent: 1965
- Easiest route: From the Brazilian town of São Gabriel da Cachoeira to Iazinho river by truck, then by boat on Iazinho river, Ia river, Caburaí river and Tucano river, then on a jungle trail with three camps (Tucano, Bebedouro Novo, Garimpo do Tucano) before the final ascent. This is the same route used for neighbouring Pico da Neblina.

Pico 31 de Março, or Pico Trinta e Um de Março in full (Portuguese pronunciation: [ˈpiku ˈtɾĩtɐ jũ dʒi ˈmaʁsu]), also known as Pico Phelps, is a mountain on the Brazil–Venezuela border. At 2,974 metres (9,757 ft) above sea level, it is Brazil's second highest mountain. It is part of the Neblina massif, and the latter's summit Pico da Neblina, Brazil's highest summit, is only 687 m (2,254 ft) away. Pico 31 de Março can be considered a secondary summit of Pico da Neblina. Therefore, it is usually climbed by expeditions primarily aiming to reach the other peak. The two are linked by a col that can be easily traversed in a short trek of about an hour.

== Discovery and naming ==
The peak was first discovered in 1954 by the Basset Maguire's expedition to the north side of the mountain massif. It was later climbed during the first attempt to climb Pico da Neblina, by a Brazilian army expedition. It received its name (meaning "March 31 Peak" in Portuguese) as a self-homage by the military regime instated in Brazil a few months earlier on that date, in a coup d'état which was then officially called the "March 31 Revolution." The peak was finally reached in the following year by another army expedition to Pico da Neblina. The name was not changed after Brazil returned to democratic rule in 1985. The peak is known as Pico Phelps in Venezuela, and it is that country's highest point outside of the Andes.

== Location ==
Pico da Neblina, in whose massif Pico 31 de Março is located, is the highest point on the Guiana Shield. Neblina means "fog" in both Portuguese and Spanish. The mountains are contained in the Brazilian Pico da Neblina National Park; their northern slopes are also protected in Venezuela's Serranía de la Neblina National Park. The twin parks, together with the neighbouring Parima Tapirapecó National Park (Venezuela), form a protected area complex of about 80,000 km^{2}, possibly the largest national park system on tropical rainforests in the world.

== Elevation measurements ==
For 39 years, based on a never before contested measurement performed in 1965 by topographer José Ambrósio de Miranda Pombo, using a theodolite, the elevation of Pico 31 de Março was thought to be 2,992 metres (9,816 ft), but a much more accurate measurement performed in 2004 with state-of-the-art GPS equipment by cartographer Marco Aurélio de Almeida Lima, member of a Brazilian army expedition, put it at 2,972.66 metres (9,752.8 ft). This was then officially recognised by the Brazilian Institute of Geography and Statistics (IBGE), the federal government's official geographic survey and census agency, which jointly organised the expedition.

In February 2016, IBGE slightly revised again the official altitude of Pico 31 de Março to 2,974.18 metres (9,757.8 ft), a 1.52-metre difference. There was no new expedition or field measurement at the time; the new value is simply a mathematical recalculation of the altitude, based on the previously obtained GPS field data, taking into account a newly available, more precise mapping of the Brazilian territory regarding the geoid (the imaginary surface based on the Earth's gravitational field that is the reference for altitudes). This explains why Pico da Neblina and Pico 31 de Março, which are next to each other, had both exactly the same altitude correction.

== Geology and topography ==
The Neblina massif is a glaciated tor composed of a tilted block of sandstone overlying Precambrian metamorphic rocks. In contrast to the sharp tooth shape of its higher neighbour, Pico 31 de Março has a smoother shape and is sometimes difficult to be clearly distinguished from Pico da Neblina on photographs, depending on the angle and distance from which the photograph was taken. Due to its equatorial latitude, while it can be cold on top, sub-freezing temperatures and frost appear to be rare (no permanent measurements are undertaken), and there is no snow. One non-authoritative source gives an average temperature of 20 °C (68 °F) during the day and 6 °C (43 °F) at night for nearby Pico da Neblina.

== Access ==
Due to its location in a national park in a border area that is also part of Yanomami territory, access to the area is restricted and depends on a special permit by the Chico Mendes Institute for Biodiversity Conservation (ICMBio). The permit can be obtained at ICMBio's office in São Gabriel da Cachoeira, but all climbers must take an accredited local guide. A four-day trek each way should be expected, three of which consisting of a jungle trek in the rainforest that can be as hard and challenging as the climb itself. Rescue is close to impossible in the area.

Onchocerciasis or "river blindness," a parasitic disease that can cause permanent blindness and is transmitted by a black fly, is endemic in the area, albeit with a low incidence; malaria and yellow fever transmission are also possible. Therefore, climbers are advised not only to take the utmost precaution in avoiding insect bites, but also to discuss preventive and/or therapeutic strategies with their physicians.

== See also ==
- Pico da Neblina National Park
- Guiana Shield
