= Duidania =

Scientific classification
- Kingdom: Plantae
- Clade: Tracheophytes
- Clade: Angiosperms
- Clade: Eudicots
- Clade: Asterids
- Order: Gentianales
- Family: Rubiaceae
- Genus: Duidania; Standl.
- Species: D. montana

Binomial name
- Duidania montana Standl.

Genus of flowering plants

Duidania is a monotypic genus of flowering plants in the family Rubiaceae. The genus contains only one species, viz. Duidania montana, which is found in Guyana and southern Venezuela.

This plant is a shrub or small tree with leathery leaves and clusters of tubular yellow flowers. It grows on the tepuis of the Guiana Highlands in wet scrub and cloud forest habitat.
