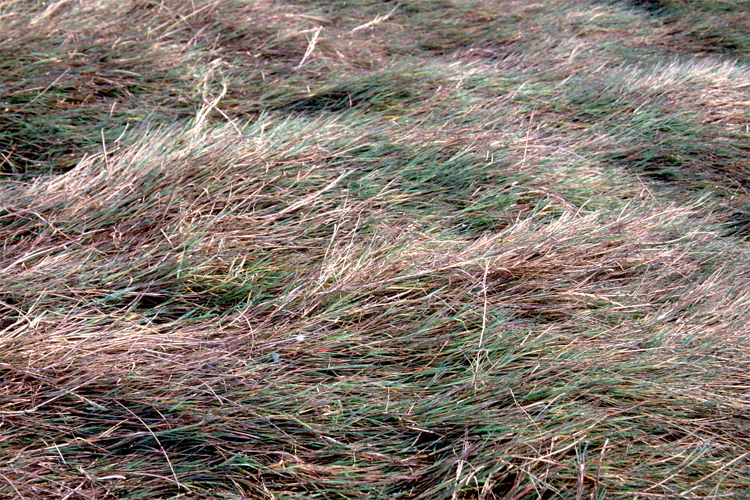

Scientific classification
- Kingdom: Plantae
- Clade: Tracheophytes
- Clade: Angiosperms
- Clade: Monocots
- Clade: Commelinids
- Order: Poales
- Family: Poaceae
- Subfamily: Pooideae
- Genus: Polypogon
- Species: P. viridis

Binomial name
- Polypogon viridis (Gouan) Breistr.

Synonyms
- Synonymy: Agrestis verticillata (Vill.) Bubani; Agrostis alba var. rivularis (Brot.) Mutel; Agrostis alba var. verticillata (Vill.) Pers.; Agrostis alba subsp. verticillata Bonnier & Layens; Agrostis alba subsp. verticillata (Vill.) Ball; Agrostis anatolica K.Koch; Agrostis aquatica Buckley, nom. illeg.; Agrostis aquatica Pourr.; Agrostis condensata Willd. ex Steud., pro syn.; Agrostis dalmatica Trin.; Agrostis decumbens Elliott, nom. nud.; Agrostis densa M.Bieb.; Agrostis frondosa Ten. ex Spreng., nom. illeg.; Agrostis kauaiensis Hillebr.; Agrostis koelerioides Romo, nom. illeg.; Agrostis leptos Steud.; Agrostis muelleri C.Presl; Agrostis refracta Moench; Agrostis rivularis Brot.; Agrostis semiverticillata (Forssk.) C.Chr.; Agrostis stolonifera var. verticillata (Vill.) DC.; Agrostis verticillata Vill.; Agrostis verticillata var. acutiglumis Costa; Agrostis verticillata var. coarctata Griseb.; Agrostis verticillata var. dalmatica (Trin.) Hayek; Agrostis verticillata proles frondosa (Halácsy) Rouy; Agrostis verticillata var. frondosa Halácsy; Agrostis verticillata var. gracilis Velen.; Agrostis villarsii Poir., nom. superfl.; Agrostis viridis Gouan (1762) (basionym); Agrostis vulgaris var. verticillata (Vill.) Le Turq.; Milium vulgare var. verticillata (Vill.) Mérat, nom. illeg.; Milium vulgare var. verticillatum (Vill.) Mérat; Nowodworskya semiverticillata (Forssk.) Nevski; Nowodworskya verticillata (Vill.) Nevski; Phalaris semiverticillata Forssk.; Polypogon × littoralis var. muticus Hook.f.; Polypogon semiverticillatus (Forssk.) Hyl.; Polypogon viridis subsp. pauciflorus H.Scholz & R.Otto; Vilfa densa (M.Bieb.) P.Beauv.; Vilfa frondosa C.Presl, nom. illeg.; Vilfa verticillata (Vill.) P.Beauv.; Vilfa villarsii P.Beauv., nom. superfl.

= Polypogon viridis =

Species of plant

Polypogon viridis, the beardless rabbitsfoot grass, water bent, is a species of perennial grass in the family Poaceae (true grasses). They have a self-supporting growth form and simple, broad leaves. Individuals can grow to 0.43 m. They are native to southern Europe, Macaronesia, North and East Africa, western and central Asia, India, Yunnan, and Vietnam.

It is a common established neophyte in the UK.

== Sources ==
This article incorporates text from a free content work. Licensed under CC0 (license statement/permission). Text taken from Polypogon viridis. Encyclopedia of Life.
