= Tapuruquara Airport =

Airport in Brazil

Tapuruquara Airport Aeroporto de Tapuruquara
- IATA: IRZ; ICAO: SWTP; LID: AM0022

Summary
- Airport type: Public
- Operator: Santa Isabel do Rio Negro
- Serves: Santa Isabel do Rio Negro
- Time zone: BRT−1 (UTC−04:00)
- Elevation AMSL: 43 m (141 ft)
- Coordinates: 00°25′43″S 064°59′35″W

Map
- Location in Brazil

Runways
Direction	Length		Surface
Direction	m	ft	Surface
09/27	1,200	3,937	Asphalt
- Source: ANAC, DECEA

Tapuruquara Airport (IATA: IRZ, ICAO: SWTP) is the airport serving Santa Isabel do Rio Negro, Brazil. The name Tapuruquara is the original name of the Municipality, which the airport officially retained.

It is operated by the Municipality of Santa Isabel do Rio Negro.

== Access ==
The airport is located 5 km (3 mi) from downtown Santa Isabel do Rio Negro.

== See also ==
- List of airports in Brazil
