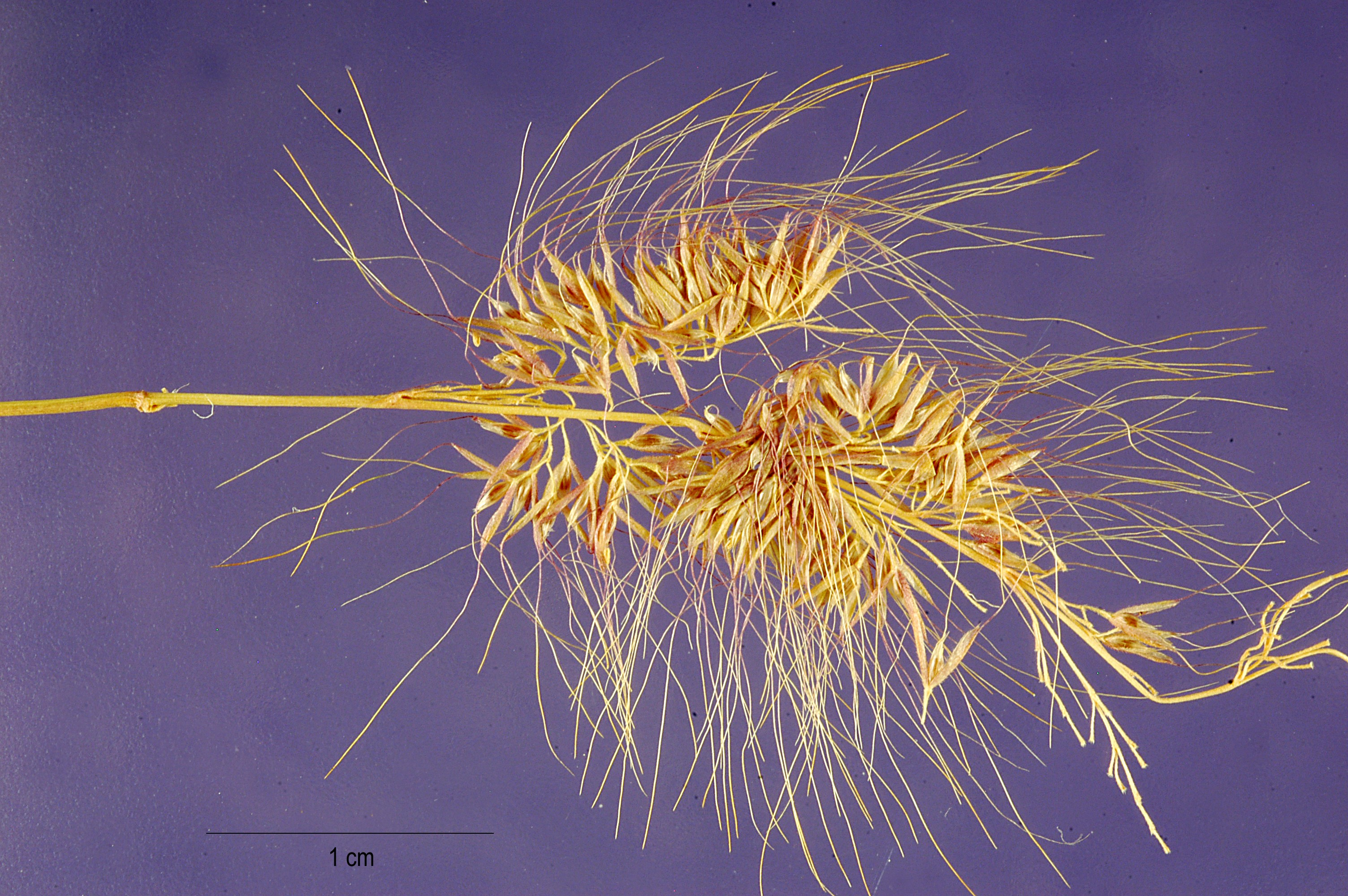

Scientific classification
- Kingdom: Plantae
- Clade: Tracheophytes
- Clade: Angiosperms
- Clade: Monocots
- Clade: Commelinids
- Order: Poales
- Family: Poaceae
- Subfamily: Pooideae
- Genus: Polypogon
- Species: P. australis

Binomial name
- Polypogon australis Brongn.

= Polypogon australis =

Species of grass

Polypogon australis is a species of grass known by the common names Chilean beard grass and Chilean rabbitsfoot grass. It is native to Chile and Argentina. It is also known in parts of the western United States where it is an introduced species and invasive species that grows in moist habitat types such as ditches.

== Description ==
It is a perennial grass producing stems up to a meter tall. The inflorescence is a panicle up to 15 or 16 centimeters long and several centimeters wide. It is fluffy in appearance and sometimes purplish in color due to the long, dark-colored awns.
