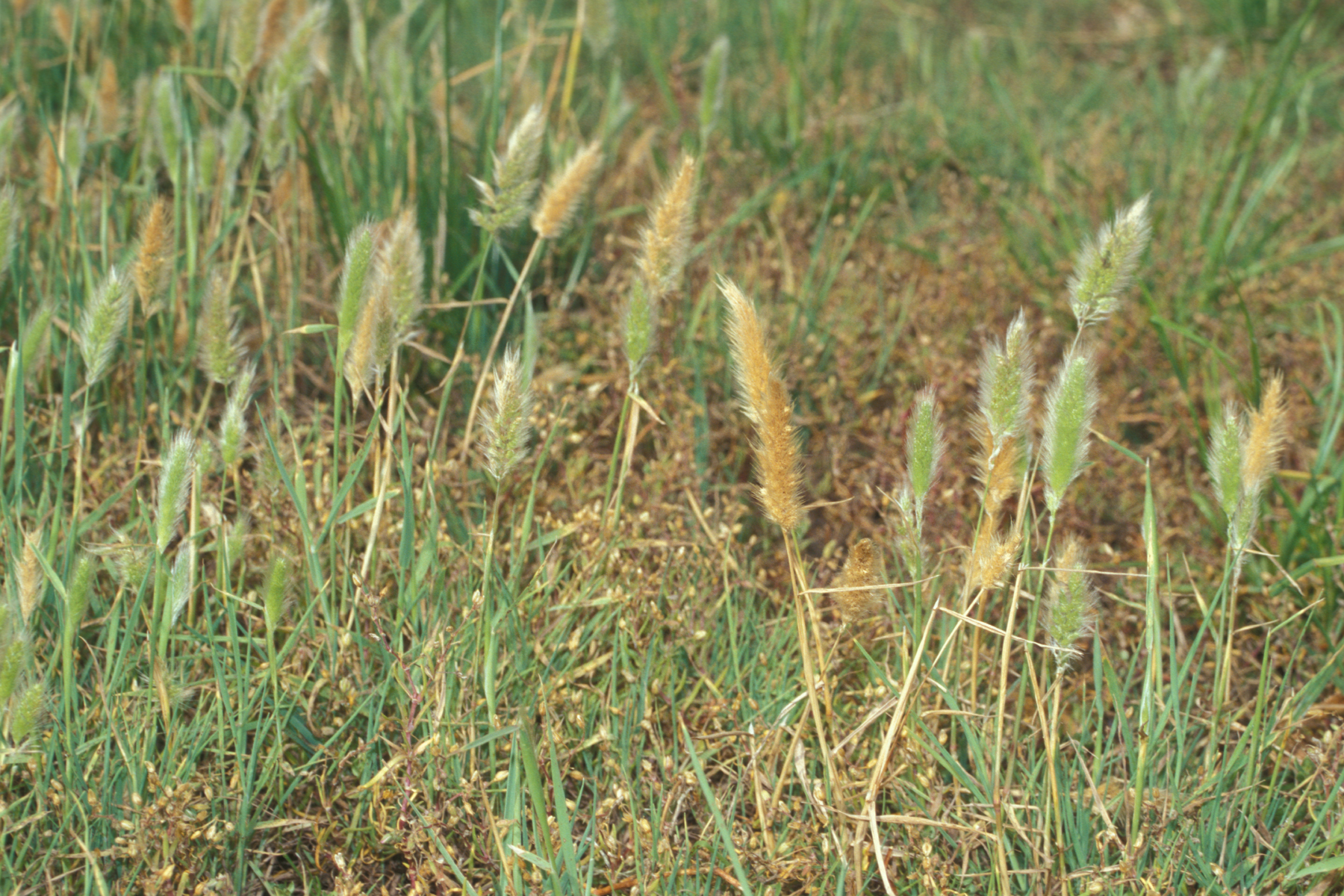
- Polypogon interruptus

Scientific classification
- Kingdom: Plantae
- Clade: Tracheophytes
- Clade: Angiosperms
- Clade: Monocots
- Clade: Commelinids
- Order: Poales
- Family: Poaceae
- Subfamily: Pooideae
- Supertribe: Poodae
- Tribe: Poeae
- Subtribe: Agrostidinae
- Genus: Polypogon; Desf.

Type species
- Polypogon monspeliensis (L.) Desf.

Synonyms
- Chaetotropis Kunth; Nowodworskya J. Presl; Polypogon sect. Nowodworskya (J. Presl) Tzvelev; Santia Savi

= Polypogon =

Genus of grasses

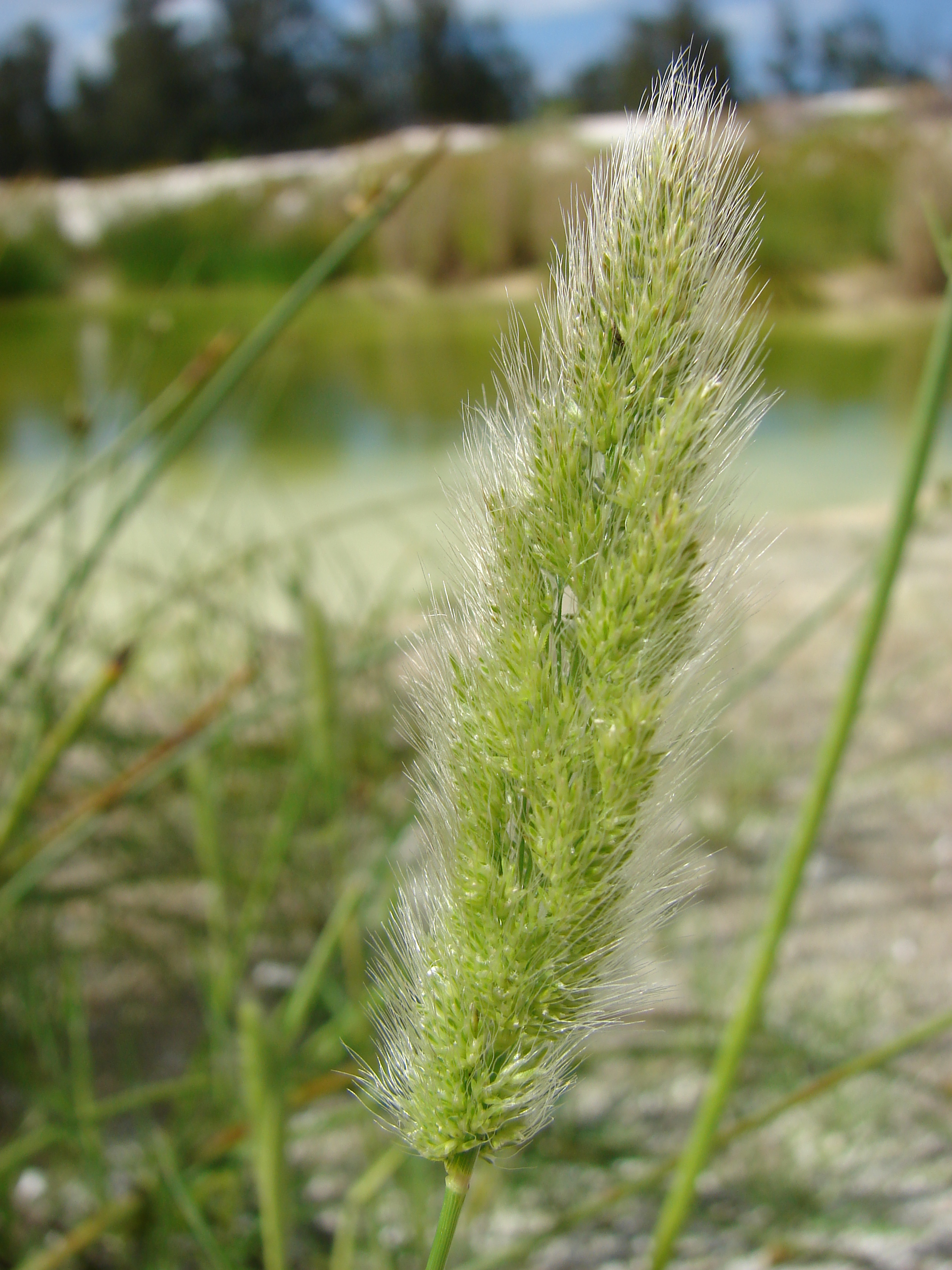
Polypogon sp.

Polypogon is a nearly cosmopolitan genus of plants in the grass family, commonly known beard grass or rabbitsfoot grass.

== Description ==
Polypogon species vary in appearance; some are erect, while others drape over the ground in waves. Many have soft, fluffy inflorescences that look like rabbit's foot amulets.

Some are introduced species established outside their native ranges. Some of those are considered invasive species and noxious weeds, most notably Polypogon monspeliensis, the annual beard grass.

Species

- Polypogon × adscendens Guss. - Italy
- Polypogon australis Brongn. - Argentina, Chile incl Juan Fernández Islands
- Polypogon chilensis (Kunth) Pilg. - Argentina, Chile incl Juan Fernández Islands, Paraguay, Uruguay, Peru, Brazil
- Polypogon elongatus Kunth - USA (CA AZ CO TX), much of Mesoamerica + South America
- Polypogon exasperatus (Trin.) Renvoize - Argentina, Chile, Paraguay, Uruguay, Peru, Ecuador, Bolivia, Colombia, southern Brazil
- Polypogon fugax Nees ex Steud. - China, Japan, Korea, central + southwestern Asia, Ethiopia, Somalia
- Polypogon griquensis (Stapf) Gibbs Russ. & Fish - Namibia, South Africa
- Polypogon hissaricus (Roshev.) Bor - Xinjiang, Central Asia, Pakistan, Iran, Himalayas
- Polypogon imberbis (Phil.) Johow - Argentina, Chile incl Juan Fernández Islands, Uruguay, southern Brazil
- Polypogon interruptus Kunth - British Columbia, western United States (WA to CA + TX), Mexico, south America
- Polypogon ivanovae Tzvelev - Xinjiang
- Polypogon linearis Trin. - Chile
- Polypogon maritimus Willd. - wetlands in Asia, Mediterranean
- Polypogon mollis (Thouars) C.E.Hubb. & E.W.Groves - Tristan da Cunha
- Polypogon monspeliensis (L.) Desf. - Africa, Eurasia; widely naturalized in North America
- Polypogon nilgiricus Kabeer & V.J.Nair - India
- Polypogon parvulus Roseng., B.R.Arrill. & Izag. - Uruguay, Argentina
- Polypogon pygmeus Tzvelev - Afghanistan
- Polypogon schimperianus (Hochst. ex Steud.) Cope - from Ethiopia + Saudi Arabia to Zimbabwe
- Polypogon tenellus R.Br. - South Australia, Western Australia
- Polypogon tenuis Brongn. - Ascension Island, St. Helena, Namibia, Cape Province
- Polypogon viridis (Gouan) Breistr. - central + southwestern Asia, Mediterranean

Formerly included

Numerous species now regarded as better suited to other genera: Agrostis, Alopecurus, Brachypodium, Chaetium, Gymnopogon, Muhlenbergia, Pentameris, Reynaudia, and Triniochloa.

== Phytoremediation ==
Polypogon monspeliensis was investigated for its mercury-accumulating properties as a phytoremediation plant. A U.S. NIS—National Institutes of Health-funded study showed the plant to take up 110 times more mercury (HgS) than control plant species. This mercury hyperaccumulator sequesters the toxin in its roots in an insoluble form, reducing exposure to ecological receptors in situ and in erosion sediments.
