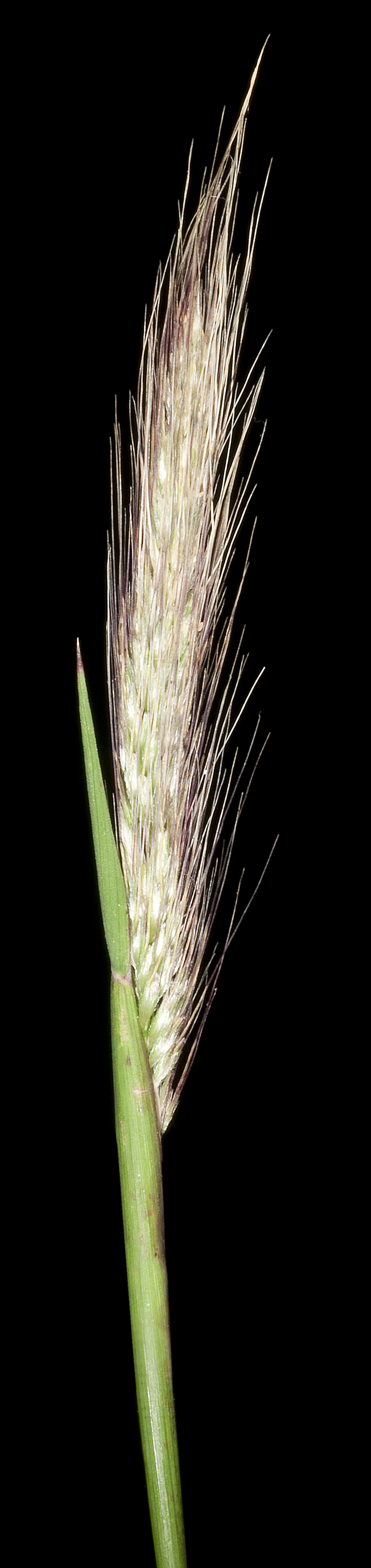

Scientific classification
- Kingdom: Plantae
- Clade: Tracheophytes
- Clade: Angiosperms
- Clade: Monocots
- Clade: Commelinids
- Order: Poales
- Family: Poaceae
- Subfamily: Pooideae
- Genus: Polypogon
- Species: P. tenellus

Binomial name
- Polypogon tenellus R.Br.

Synonyms
- Alopecurus tenellus Poir. Polypogon drummondii Steud. Polypogon tenellus var. drummondii (Steud.) Benth. Polypogon tenellus var. oldfieldii Benth.

= Polypogon tenellus =

Species of plant

Polypogon tenellus is a species of annual grass in the family Poaceae (true grasses), first described by Robert Brown in 1810. It is native to Western Australia and South Australia.
