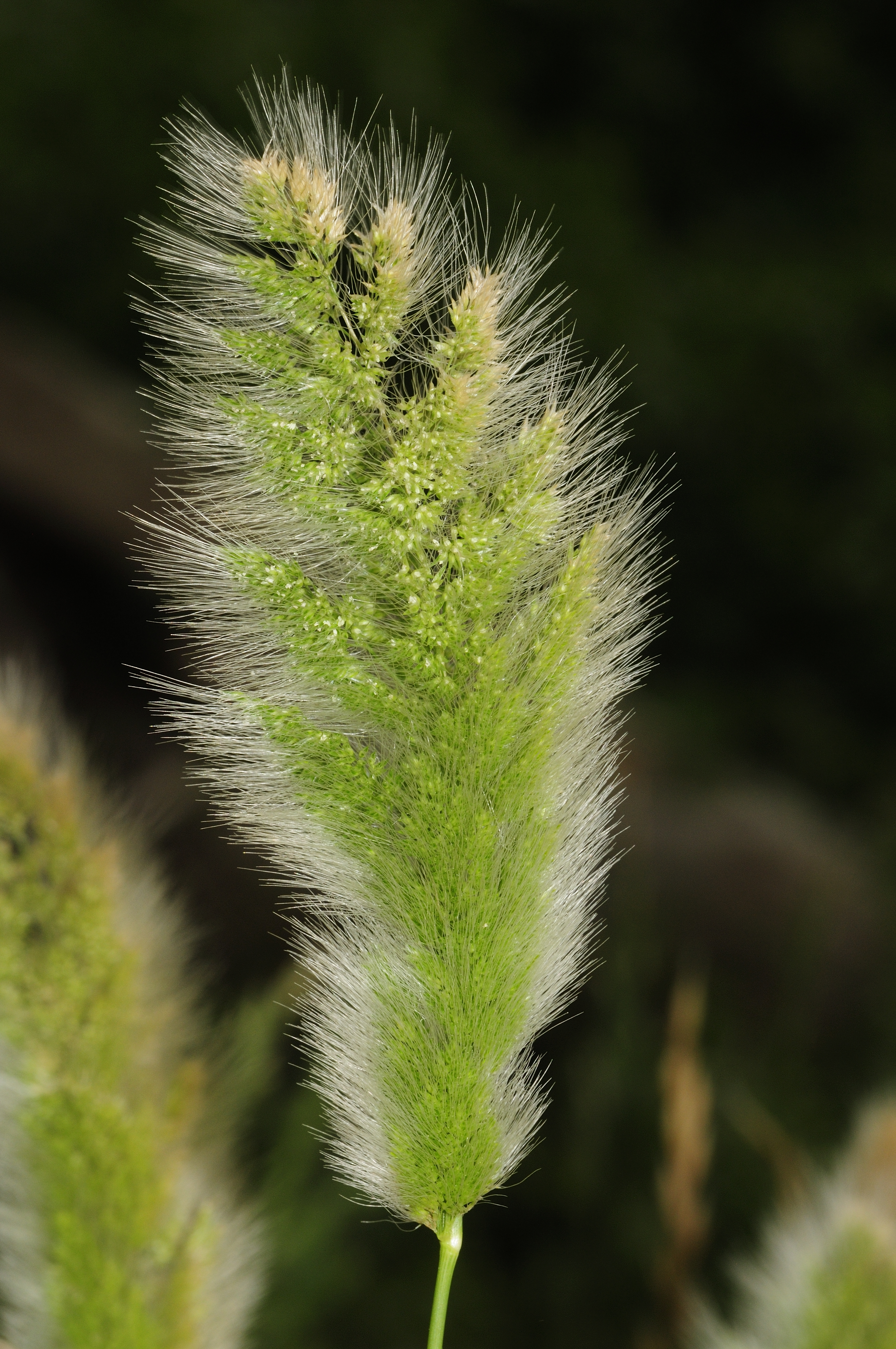

Scientific classification
- Kingdom: Plantae
- Clade: Tracheophytes
- Clade: Angiosperms
- Clade: Monocots
- Clade: Commelinids
- Order: Poales
- Family: Poaceae
- Subfamily: Pooideae
- Genus: Polypogon
- Species: P. monspeliensis

Binomial name
- Polypogon monspeliensis (L.) Desf.

= Polypogon monspeliensis =

Species of grass

Polypogon monspeliensis, commonly known as annual beard-grass or annual rabbitsfoot grass, is a species of grass. It is native to the Old World, but it can be found today throughout the world as an introduced species and sometimes a noxious weed. It is an annual grass growing to heights between 5 centimeters and one meter. The soft, fluffy inflorescence is a dense, greenish, plumelike panicle, sometimes divided into lobes. The spikelets have long, thin, whitish awns, which give the inflorescence its texture.
