= Guiana Shield =

Precambrian geological formation in northeast South America

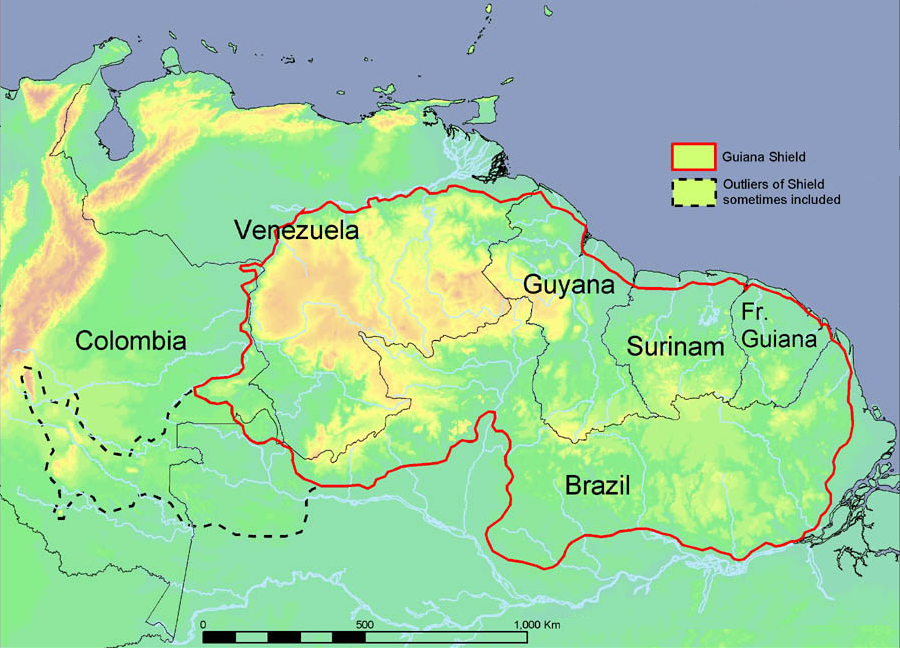
- Political map of the Guiana Shield
- Interactive map of Guiana Shield
- Coordinates: 5°08′36″N 60°45′45″W
- Region: South America

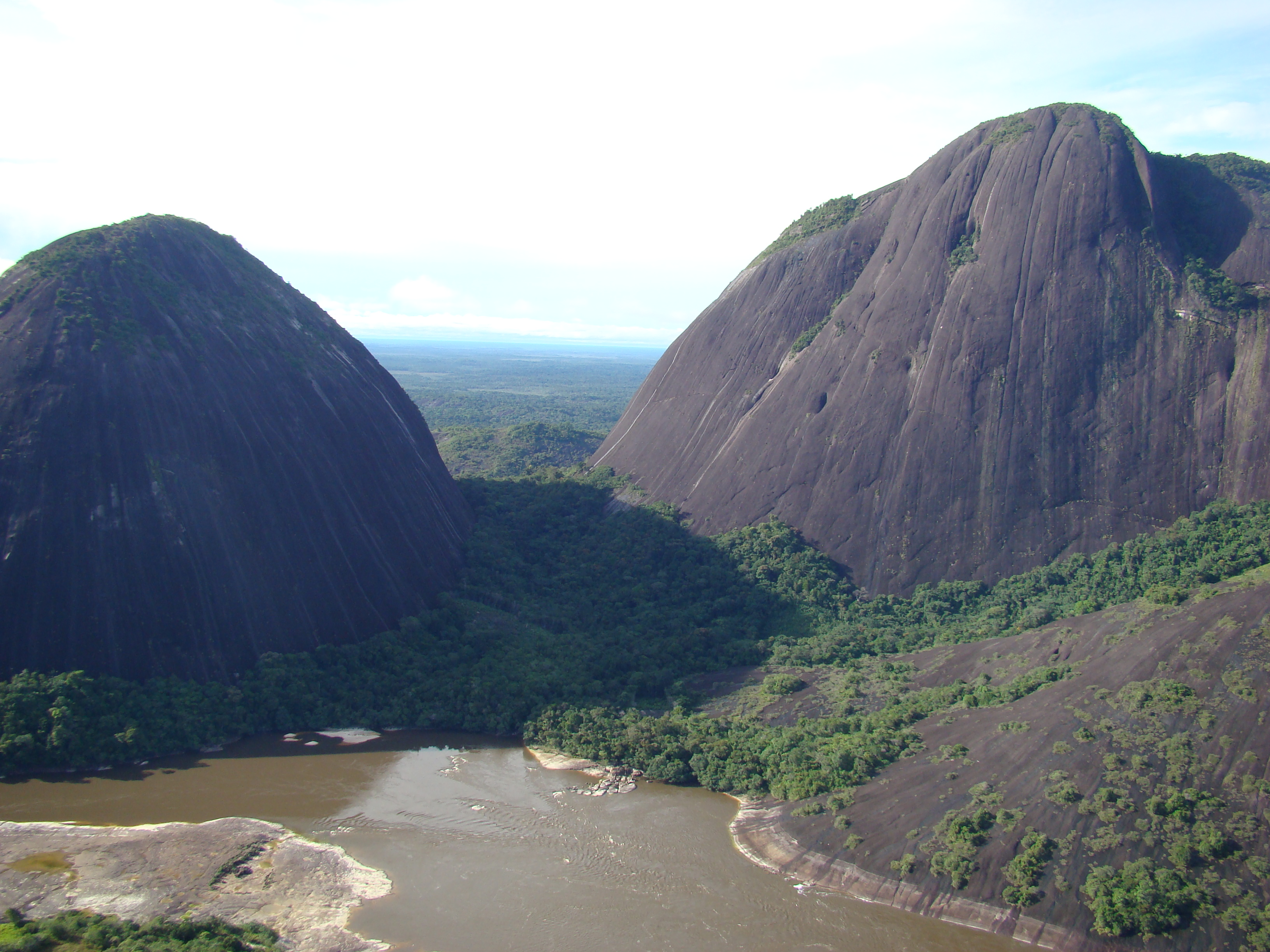
Cerros de Mavecure, Guainía department, Colombia

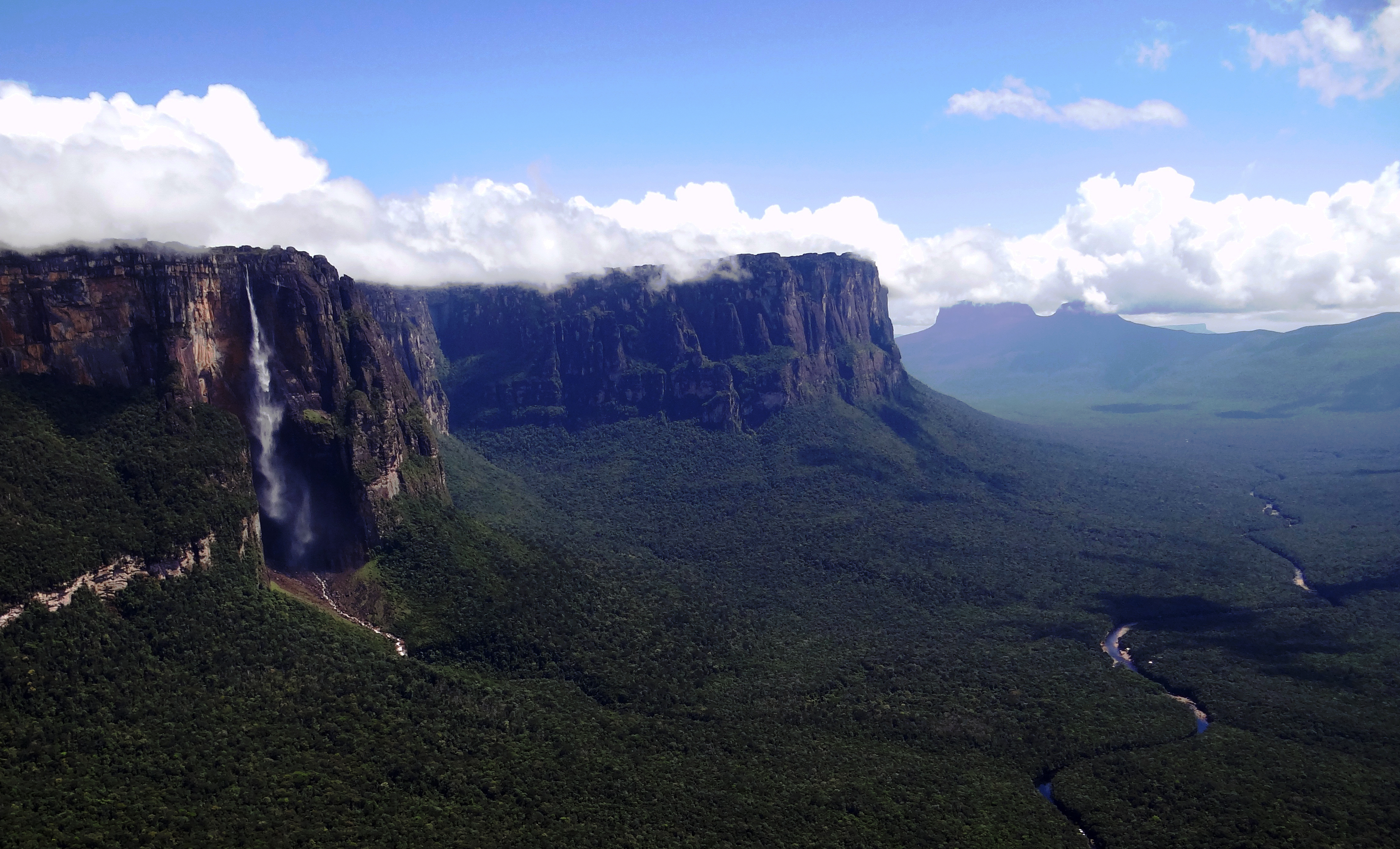
Devil's Canyon in the Canaima National Park, Venezuela

Map of the Guianas

The Guiana Shield (Note: The term Guiana or The Guianas is often used as a collective name for Guyana, Suriname and French Guiana, and sometimes even includes the portions of Colombia, Venezuela and Brazil (including most of the state of Roraima) which are on the Guiana Shield.) (French: Plateau des Guyanes, Bouclier guyanais; Dutch: Hoogland van Guyana, Guianaschild; Portuguese: Planalto das Guianas, Escudo das Guianas; Spanish: Escudo guayanés) is one of the three cratons of the South American plate. It is a 1.7 billion-year-old Precambrian geological formation in northeast South America that forms a portion of the northern coast. The higher elevations on the shield are called the Guiana Highlands, which is where the table-like mountains called tepuis are found. The Guiana Highlands are also the source of some of the world's most well-known waterfalls such as Angel Falls, Kaieteur Falls, and Cuquenan Falls.

The Guiana Shield underlies Guyana (previously British Guiana), Suriname (previously Dutch Guiana), and French Guiana (or Guyane), much of southern Venezuela, most of Brazil north of the Amazon River, and parts of eastern Colombia. The first three are called The Guianas, and most of the Guiana Shield coincides with Guiana Island. The rocks of the Guiana Shield consist of metasediments and metavolcanics (greenstones) overlain by sub-horizontal layers of sandstones, quartzites, shales and conglomerates intruded by sills of younger mafic intrusives such as gabbros.

== Geology ==
The oldest rocks in the shield consist of Archean Imataca Complex, composed of a quartz-feldspar gneiss and subordinate mafic gneiss. The Guri Fault marks the southern boundary of the complex. South of that fault are Early Proterozoic rocks consisting of the metavolcanic Pastora Supergroup and the granitic plutonic Supamo Complex. The Cuchivero Group consists of ash flow tuff and granitic plutonic rocks. The Early to Middle Proterozoic Roraima Group consists of continental clastic sedimentary rocks. These Precambrian sediments include quartz sandstones, quartzites, and conglomerates presumed to be 1.8 to 1.4 Ga in age.

== Geomorphology ==
There are three upland areas of the Guiana Shield:

1. The Guiana Highlands proper are in Venezuela east of the Orinoco and extend across much of west-central Guyana and into the northern Roraima state in Brazil.
2. The Tumucumaque Uplands are a series of central massifs in an arc from the Wilhelmina Mountains of south-central Suriname, along the southern boundary of Suriname and Guyana, forming the Acarai Mountains of Roraima state and the Tumuc-Humac Mountains of Pará and Amapá states of Brazil. From this arc, the southern uplands slope gently downwards towards the Amazon River and the northern uplands slope gently downwards toward the Atlantic.
3. The Chiribiquete Plateau is a sandstone-topped plateau with an elevation of 900 m (2,953 ft) that forms the western edge of the shield. The plateau is separated from the eastern Andes by the thick Neogene sediments of the Sub-Andean Trough that runs along the northern and western rim of the Guiana Shield.

The north-central part of the Guiana Highlands is dominated by high flat-topped peaks called tepuis, of the Roraima supergroup and Quasi-Roraima formation, and the rounded granite peaks of the Parguaza and Imataca complexes to the north and southwestern edges of the area. The highest point in the shield is Pico da Neblina in Brazil at 2,995 metres (9,826 ft). Pico da Neblina is the highest summit of the larger Neblina massif, a highly eroded sandstone plateau that straddles the Venezuela-Brazil border and that has lost the typical tabletop shape of the other tepuis in the region.

== Ecology ==
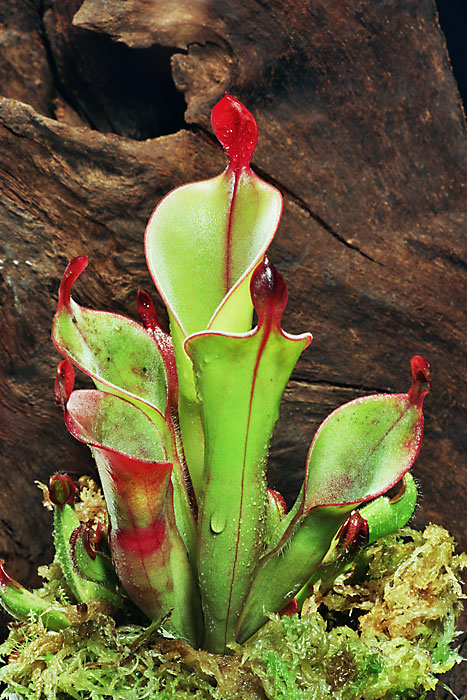
Heliamphora chimantensis, endemic to the Chimantá Massif (a Venezuelan part of the Guiana Shield)

The Guiana Shield is one of the world's most biodiverse regions, and has many endemic species. The region houses over 3000 vertebrate species: 1168 fresh water fish, 269 amphibians (54% endemics), 295 reptiles (29%), 1004 birds (7.7%), and 282 mammals (11%). Diversity of invertebrates remains largely undocumented, but there are several species of endemic butterflies and dung beetles.

Plant life is equally rich and 13,367 species of vascular plants have been found, approximately 40% of which is considered endemic. The shield is overlain by the largest expanse of tropical forest on any Precambrian shield area in the world. Guianan rain forest is similar in nature to Amazonian rain forest and known protected areas include the Iwokrama Forest of central Guyana, Kaieteur, Kanuku National Park of southern Guyana, the UNESCO World Heritage Site Central Suriname Nature Reserve of Suriname, the Guiana Amazonian Park in French Guiana and the Tumucumaque National Park in the Amapá State of Brazil. In Venezuela the forests are protected by Canaima, Parima-Tapirapeco and Serranía de la Neblina national parks. In 2014, the Government of Colombia designated a 250 hectare area of the Guiana Shield, as a Ramsar Wetland, thus becoming a protected area of international importance in accordance to the Ramsar Convention.

According to recent researches, although ecosystems of the Guiana Highlands remain vibrant, emerging issues (including "a well-known invasive plant elsewhere" Poa annua and "one of the most aggressive weeds" Polypogon elongatus) and infectious faecal bacteria Helicobacter pylori have been documented.

== See also ==
- Gran Sabana – Region in southeastern Venezuela
- Tepui – Table-top mountain or mesa in the Guiana Highlands of South America
- Canadian Shield – Geographic and geologic area of North America
- Caribbean South America – Subregion of South America
- Mount Roraima – Mountain in Brazil, Guyana and Venezuela
- Pico da Neblina – Highest mountain in Brazil
- Great American Interchange – Paleozoographic event resulting from the formation of the Isthmus of Panama
- Geography of South America
