= Koyamaea =

Scientific classification
- Kingdom: Plantae
- Clade: Tracheophytes
- Clade: Angiosperms
- Clade: Monocots
- Clade: Commelinids
- Order: Poales
- Family: Cyperaceae
- Genus: Koyamaea; W.W.Thomas & G.Davidse
- Species: K. neblinensis

Binomial name
- Koyamaea neblinensis W.W.Thomas & G.Davidse

Genus of plants

Koyamaea is a monotypic genus of flowering plants belonging to the family Cyperaceae. The only species is Koyamaea neblinensis W.W.Thomas & G.Davidse.

Its native range is southern Venezuela and northern Brazil.

It grows in habitats that are steep, rocky hillside with scattered shrubs and tree that are no more than 2-3m tall and the surrounding vegetation mainly consisting of bromeliads. It grows at elevations of 500–700 metres (1,600–2,300 ft) above sea level.

The genus name of Koyamaea is in honour of Tetsuo Michael Koyama (b. 1933), a Japanese botanist at the New York Botanical Garden and also specialist in Cyperaceae. The Latin specific epithet of neblinensis refers to Cerro de la Neblina or Sierra de la Neblina . Both species and genus were first described and published in Syst. Bot. Vol.14 on page 189 in 1989.
