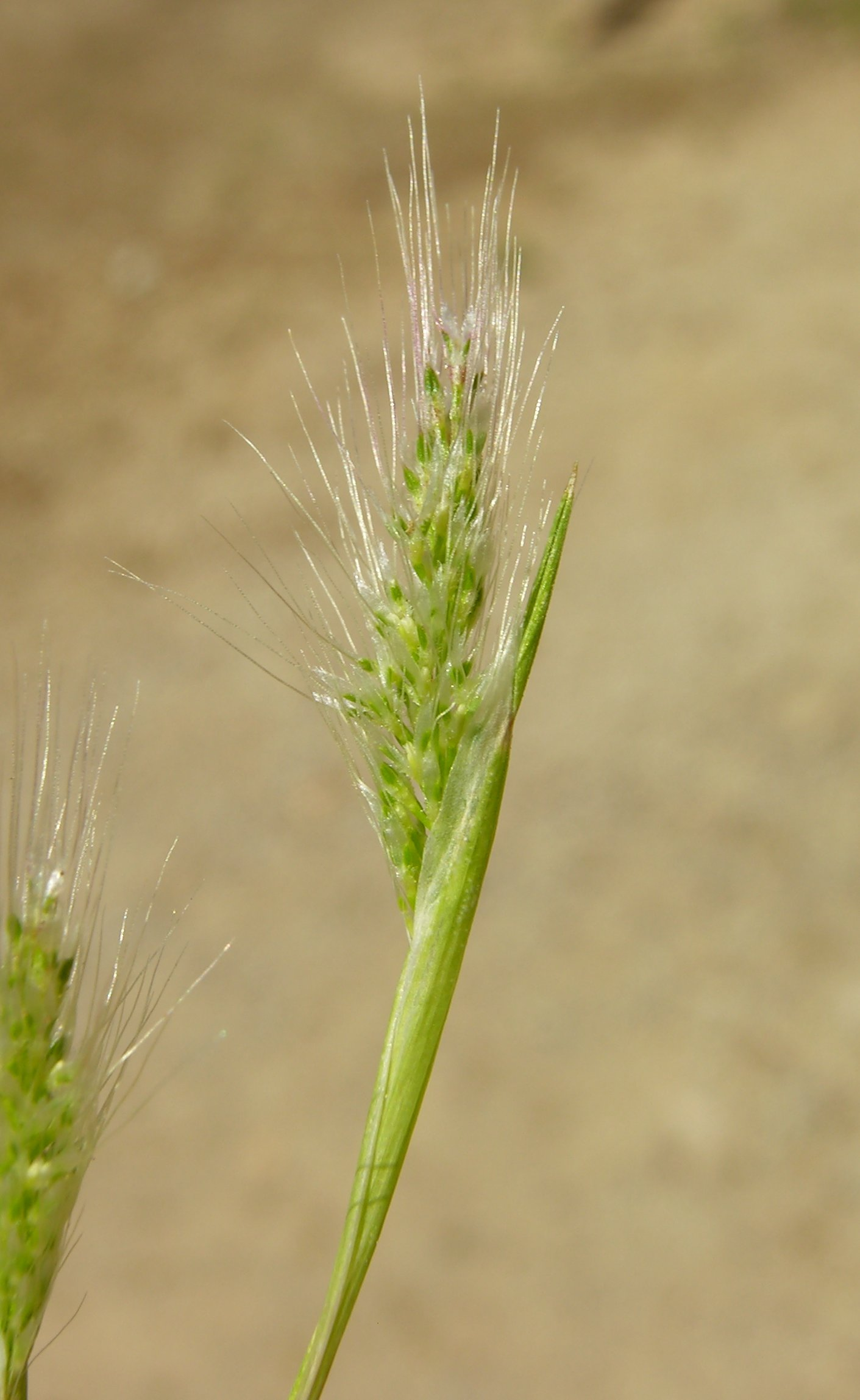

Scientific classification
- Kingdom: Plantae
- Clade: Tracheophytes
- Clade: Angiosperms
- Clade: Monocots
- Clade: Commelinids
- Order: Poales
- Family: Poaceae
- Subfamily: Pooideae
- Genus: Polypogon
- Species: P. maritimus

Binomial name
- Polypogon maritimus Willd.

= Polypogon maritimus =

Species of grass

Polypogon maritimus is a species of grass known by the common names Mediterranean beard grass and Mediterranean rabbitsfoot grass. It is native to the Mediterranean Basin. It is also known in other parts of the world, including Australia, New Zealand, and the United States, as an introduced species that can be found in moist habitat types. It is an annual grass producing stems up to half a meter tall. The inflorescence is a plumelike panicle up to 15 centimeters long containing many V-shaped spikelets with long awns.
