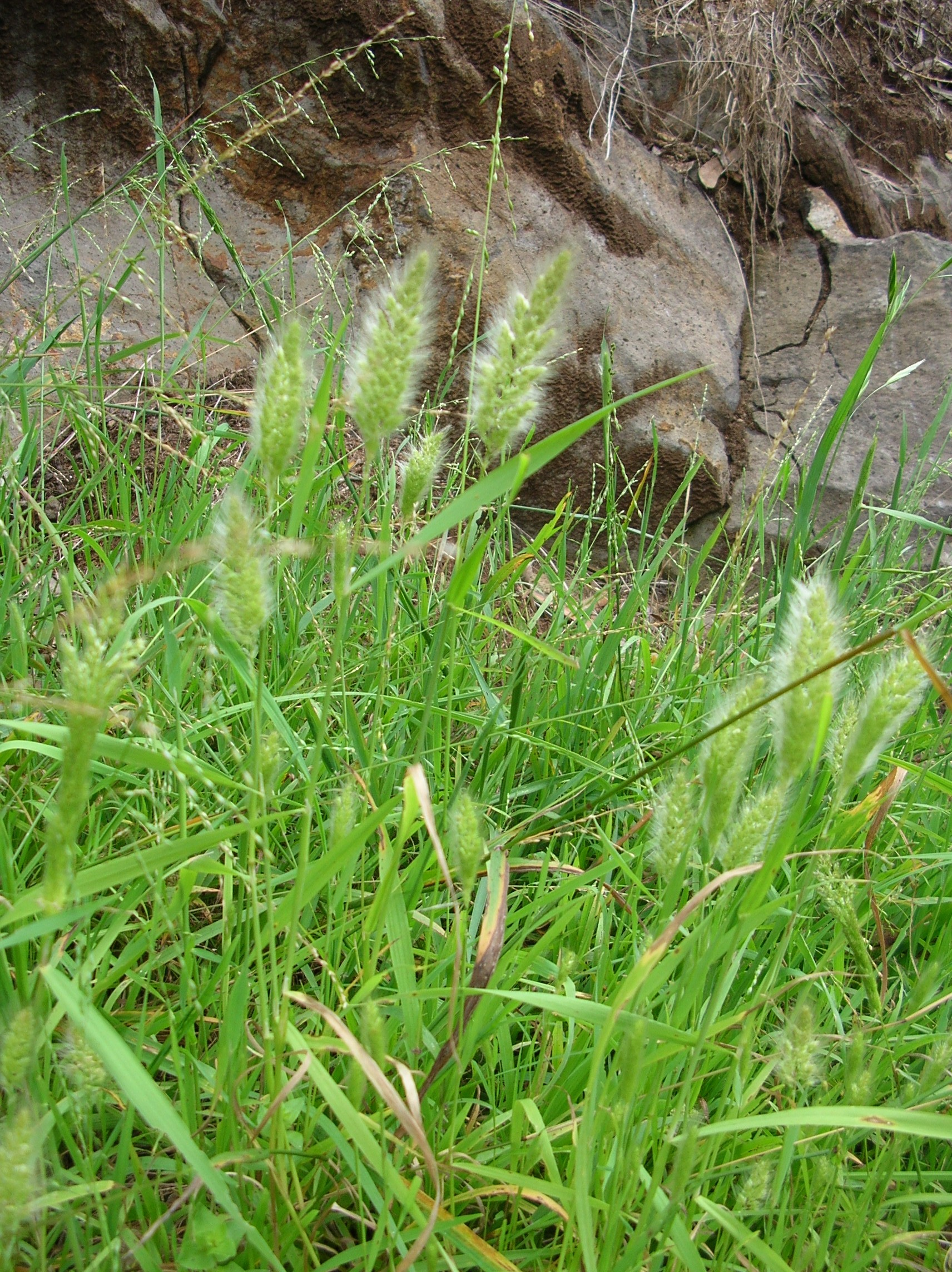

Scientific classification
- Kingdom: Plantae
- Clade: Tracheophytes
- Clade: Angiosperms
- Clade: Monocots
- Clade: Commelinids
- Order: Poales
- Family: Poaceae
- Subfamily: Pooideae
- Genus: Polypogon
- Species: P. interruptus

Binomial name
- Polypogon interruptus Kunth

= Polypogon interruptus =

Species of grass

Polypogon interruptus, commonly known as ditch rabbitsfoot grass or ditch beard grass, is a species of grass.
