= Santa Isabel do Rio Negro =

Municipality of Amazonas, Brazil

- Municipality
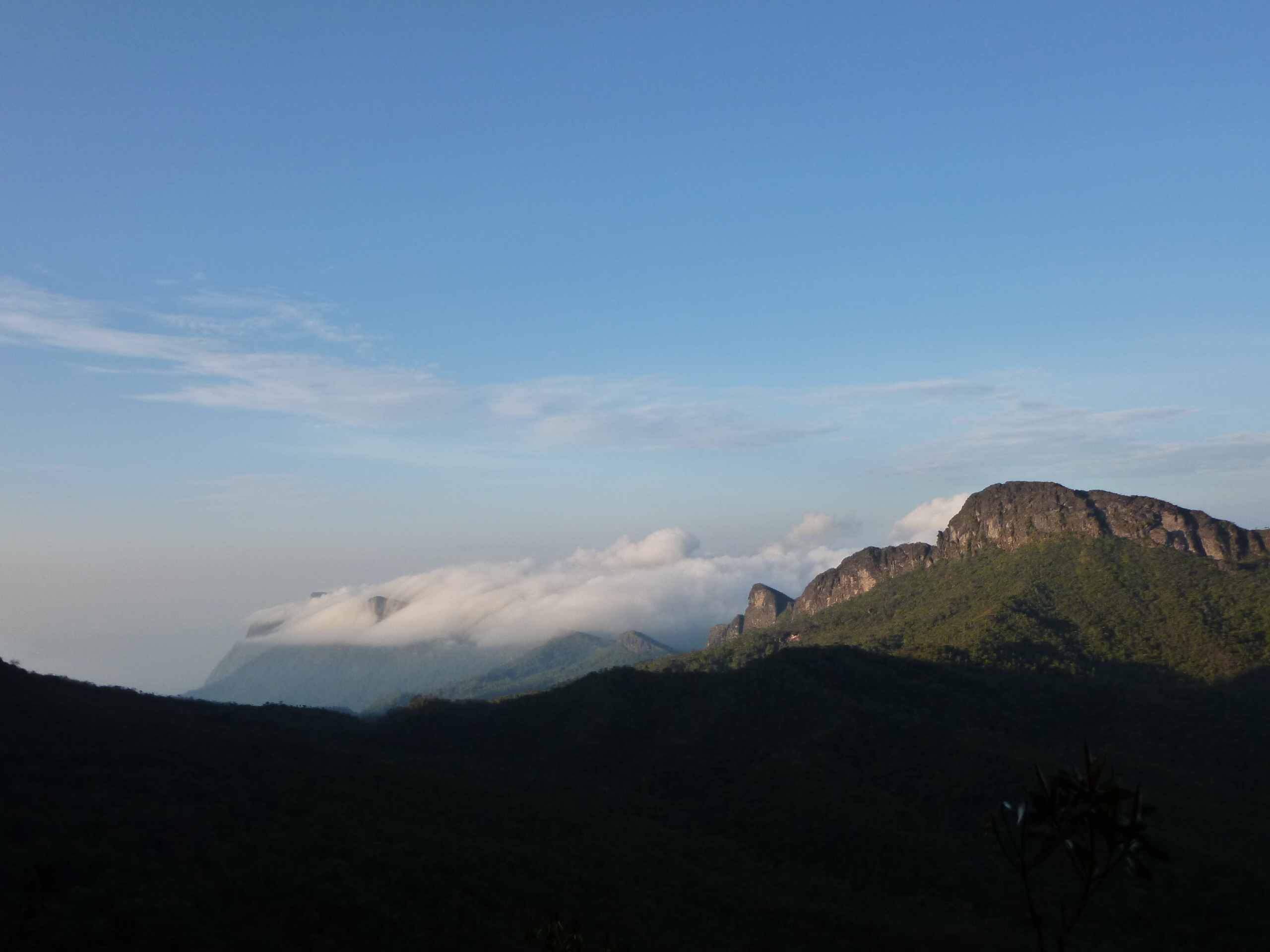
- Pico da Neblina background covered by clouds, the highest point in Brazil located in the municipality, bordering Venezuela.

- Flag Coat of arms

- Location of the municipality inside Amazonas

- Location in Brazil
- Coordinates: 0°24′50″S 65°1′8″W
- Country: Brazil
- Region: North
- State: Amazonas

Area
  - Total: 62,846 km^{2} (24,265 sq mi)

Population (2020)
  - Total: 25,865
  - Density: 0.29/km^{2} (0.75/sq mi)
- Time zone: UTC−4 (AMT)

Santa Isabel do Rio Negro (Saint Isabel of Black River) is a municipality located in the Brazilian state of Amazonas. Its population was 25,865 (2020) and its area is 62,846 square kilometres (24,265 sq mi). Pico da Neblina, the highest mountain in Brazil at 2,994 metres (9,822 feet), is located in the municipality. The Municipality was formerly called Tapuruquara.

== Geography ==
Pico da Neblina, the highest mountain in Brazil at 2,994 metres (9,822 feet), is located in the municipality. However, the peak is 180 kilometres (110 mi) in a straight line from the urban seat of the municipality, inaccessible except through the Amazon rainforest, and in both a national park and a Yanomami reservation under federal control and with restricted access.

The municipality also contains part of the Amazonas National Forest.

== Transportation ==
The city is served by Tapuruquara Airport.
