= Pico da Neblina =

Highest mountain in Brazil

- Yaripo
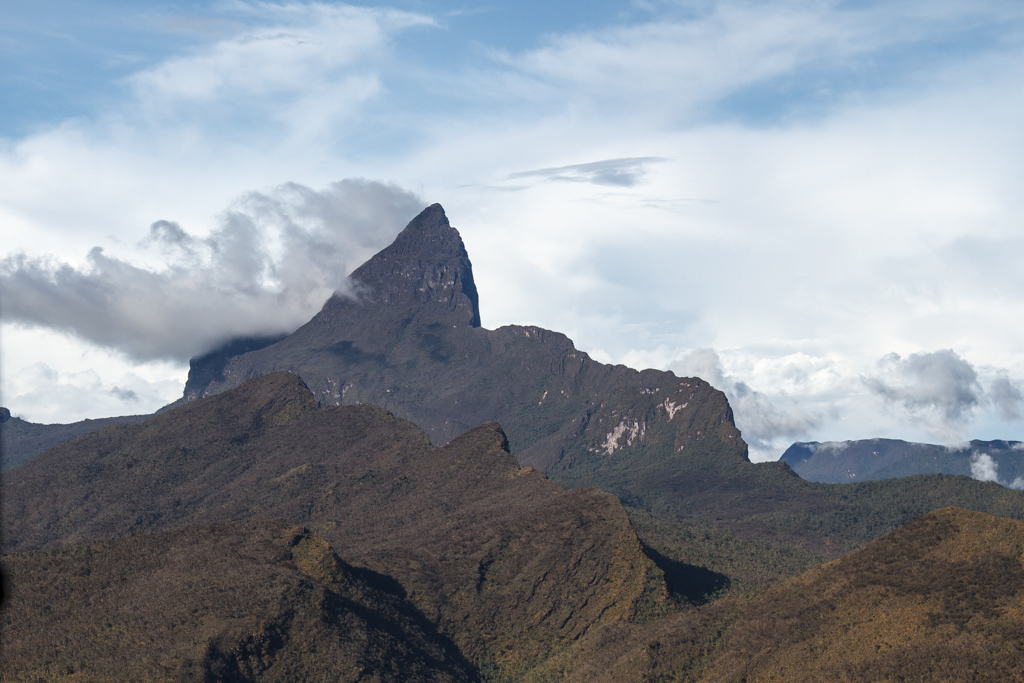
- Pico da Neblina in February 2015

Highest point
- Elevation: 2,995.30 m (9,827.1 ft)
- Listing: Country high point; Amazonas high point; Ultra
- Coordinates: 0°48′17″N 66°00′24″W

Naming
- Etymology: Portuguese for "Mist Peak"
- Native name: Yaripo (Yanomamö)
- English translation: Mountain of the Winds

Geography
- Location of Pico da Neblina in Brazil
- Location: Pico da Neblina National Park, Yanomami Indigenous Territory
- Country: Brazil
- State: Amazonas
- Municipality: Santa Isabel do Rio Negro
- Parent range: Serra da Neblina

Climbing
- First ascent: 1965, by José Ambrósio de Miranda Pombo
- Normal route: Via Maturacá and Porto Tucano

Pico da Neblina (Portuguese pronunciation: [ˈpiku dɐ neˈblĩnɐ], literally "Mist Peak") is the highest mountain in Brazil, at 2,995.30 metres (9,827 ft) above sea level. It rises in northwestern Amazonas, in the Serra da Neblina of the Serra do Imeri, near the southern edge of the Guiana Highlands. The summit lies about 687 m (2,254 ft) inside Brazil. Nearby Pico 31 de Março, the country's second-highest summit at 2,974.18 m (9,758 ft), lies directly on the Brazil–Venezuela border. Pico da Neblina is the highest point of the Guiana Shield and the highest point in South America east of the Andean cordilleras.

Yanomami communities of the Cauaburis region call the mountain Yaripo, usually translated as "Mountain of the Winds". The name also covers the high ridge carrying Pico da Neblina and Pico 31 de Março. Yaripo is sacred in Yanomami belief. Sites along the route to the summit figure in ancestral stories and in rituals concerning spirits and the natural world. The summit is inside Pico da Neblina National Park and the Yanomami Indigenous Territory. The Brazilian national park was created in 1979.

The mountain rises steeply above the lowlands of the upper Rio Negro basin. Resistant quartz-rich rocks form much of the upper mountain, where narrow ridges and escarpments rise above high ground exceeding 2,000 m (6,600 ft). Temperature falls sharply with elevation, and rain, cloud and mist keep the upper slopes wet for long periods. Amazonian rainforest at lower elevations changes into montane forest and, higher up, low shrubs, herbs, exposed rock and saturated ground. Some species of the upper massif occur nowhere else, or in only a few other parts of the Guiana Highlands. Among them are the frogs Neblinaphryne mayeri and Caligophryne doylei. Their nearest living relatives diverged from them more than 45 million years ago.

Naturalists had seen the mountains from the Rio Negro by the nineteenth century, but expeditions began entering the upper massif in the 1950s. Brazilian topographer José Ambrósio de Miranda Pombo made the first known ascent of Pico da Neblina in 1965 while working on the Brazil–Venezuela boundary. Tourist climbing grew during the late twentieth century, then stopped in 2003 after disputes over entry into Yanomami territory and damage inside the national park. Visits resumed in 2022 under the Yanomami-run Yaripo ecotourism program. Illegal gold mining, hunting and unauthorized entry still affect the protected lands around the mountain, while species confined to the highest elevations face risks from warming and amphibian disease.

== Names ==
Yanomami communities of the Cauaburis region call the mountain Yaripo, usually translated as "Mountain of the Winds". Serra Yaripo also names the high ridge carrying Pico da Neblina and neighbouring Pico 31 de Março, which has its own Yanomami name, Kurarana. In Yanomami speech, Pico da Neblina is a napëpë name, brought by white people and other outsiders.

While travelling near Marabitanas on the Rio Negro in 1853, Alfred Russel Wallace wrote that he could see the "serras of the Cababurís". Richard Spruce also saw a distant ridge with steep escarpments from the same area. John F. Pruski interpreted Wallace's mountains as probably corresponding to what is now called the Serra da Neblina, although Wallace drew them too far west. The older names do not fit present maps neatly. Pirabuku and Imei were also used for mountains near the frontier, without a firm match to names adopted afterward.

On the Brazilian side, mountains north of the Rio Negro were also called Serra do Caburi. Brazilian botanist Ricardo de Lemos Fróis, who had seen them from the air in 1952, thought the Cerro de la Neblina publicized in the 1950s was one of its peaks. He wrote that people along the Rio Negro already knew the Serra do Caburi and told Indigenous stories about it. Serra do Caburi did not become the usual name for the massif.

The Phelps expedition travelled to the mountains in 1954 using the Venezuelan name Cerro Jimé. Kathleen Deery de Phelps retained it in the title of her memoir, Memorias de Misia Kathy: Primera Expedición Phelps al "Cerro Jimé", actual Cerro de La Neblina.

Bassett Maguire and Charles D. Reynolds used Cerro de la Neblina in print by 1955. Neblina means mist or fog. In Venezuela, Cerro de la Neblina and Serranía La Neblina are used for the massif. In Brazil, Pico da Neblina, literally "Mist Peak", names the highest summit, while Serra da Neblina names the surrounding mountains. Pico da Neblina was already the federal name when the national park was created in 1979.

A plant collected on the Brazilian side in December 1965 gave its locality as Pico Phelps at 2,600 to 2,700 m (8,500 to 8,900 ft). Scientific work from the 1980s sometimes paired Pico Phelps with Pico da Neblina, and specimens from a 1984–1985 expedition were labelled "Pico Phelps (= Pico Neblina)". The Venezuelan park service uses Pico Phelps for the highest summit on its side of the massif. Brazilian maps call the neighbouring summit on the international boundary Pico 31 de Março, with an official elevation of 2,974.18 m (9,758 ft). These uses do not consistently point to a single summit.

== Geography ==
=== Location and protected status ===
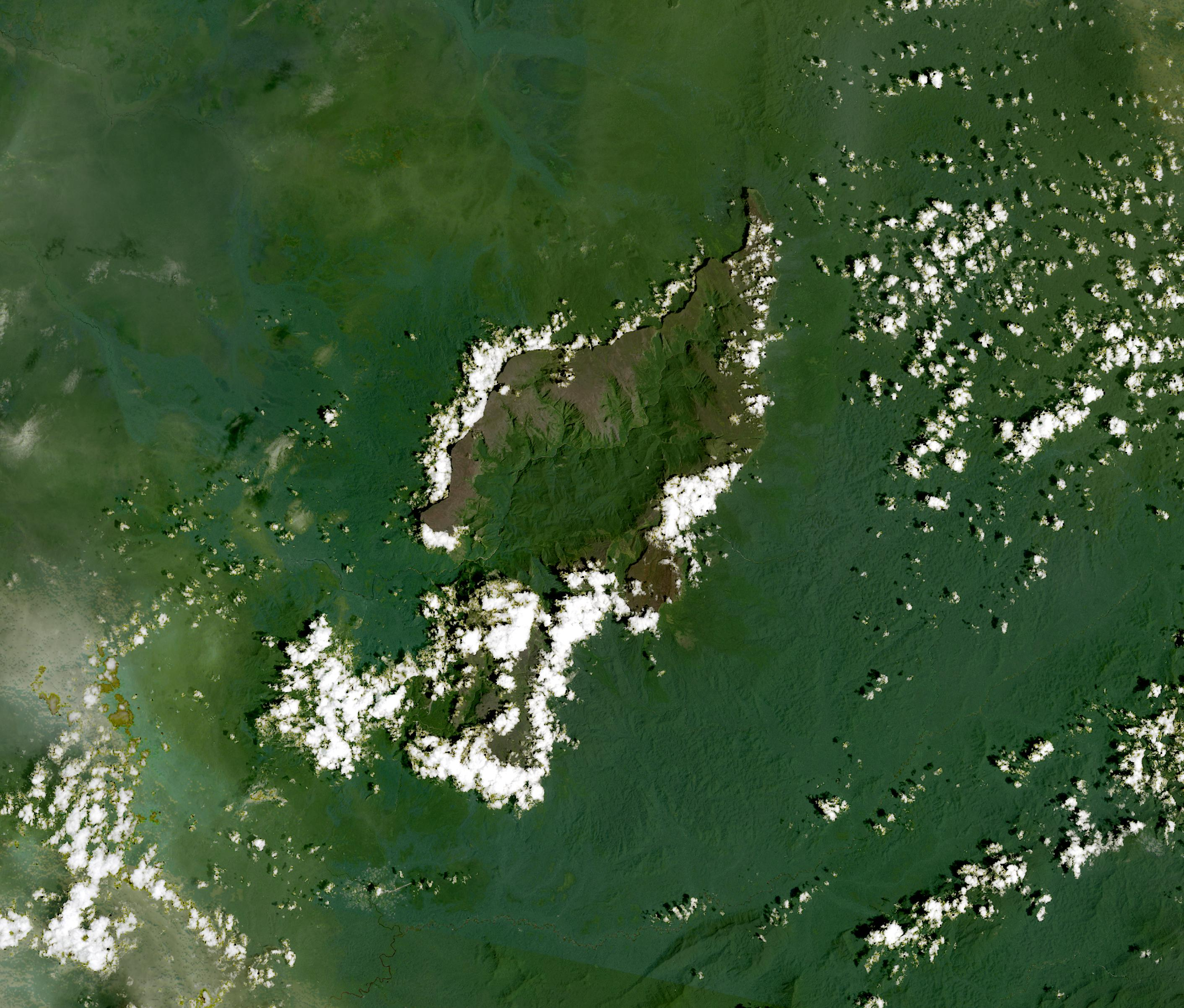
Satellite image of the Serra do Imeri, which contains Pico da Neblina and Pico 31 de Março.

Pico da Neblina rises in the Serra do Imeri of northwestern Amazonas, near the Venezuelan frontier, with its summit in the municipality of Santa Isabel do Rio Negro. Pico da Neblina National Park extends eastward into São Gabriel da Cachoeira. Of the park's area, 70.79 percent lies in Santa Isabel do Rio Negro and 29.21 percent in São Gabriel da Cachoeira.

The summit lies within the national park and the Yanomami Indigenous Territory. The park also overlaps the Balaio, Médio Rio Negro II and Cué-Cué Marabitanas Indigenous Territories. Indigenous territories cover nearly 72 percent of the park, with the Yanomami territory alone covering just over half.

Pico da Neblina National Park was created on 5 June 1979 along the Venezuelan frontier. Across the border, the massif enters Venezuela's Serranía de la Neblina National Park, established in 1978. Brazil added Pico da Neblina National Park to its UNESCO World Heritage Tentative List in 1996 under natural criteria vii, ix and x.

=== International border and nearby summits ===
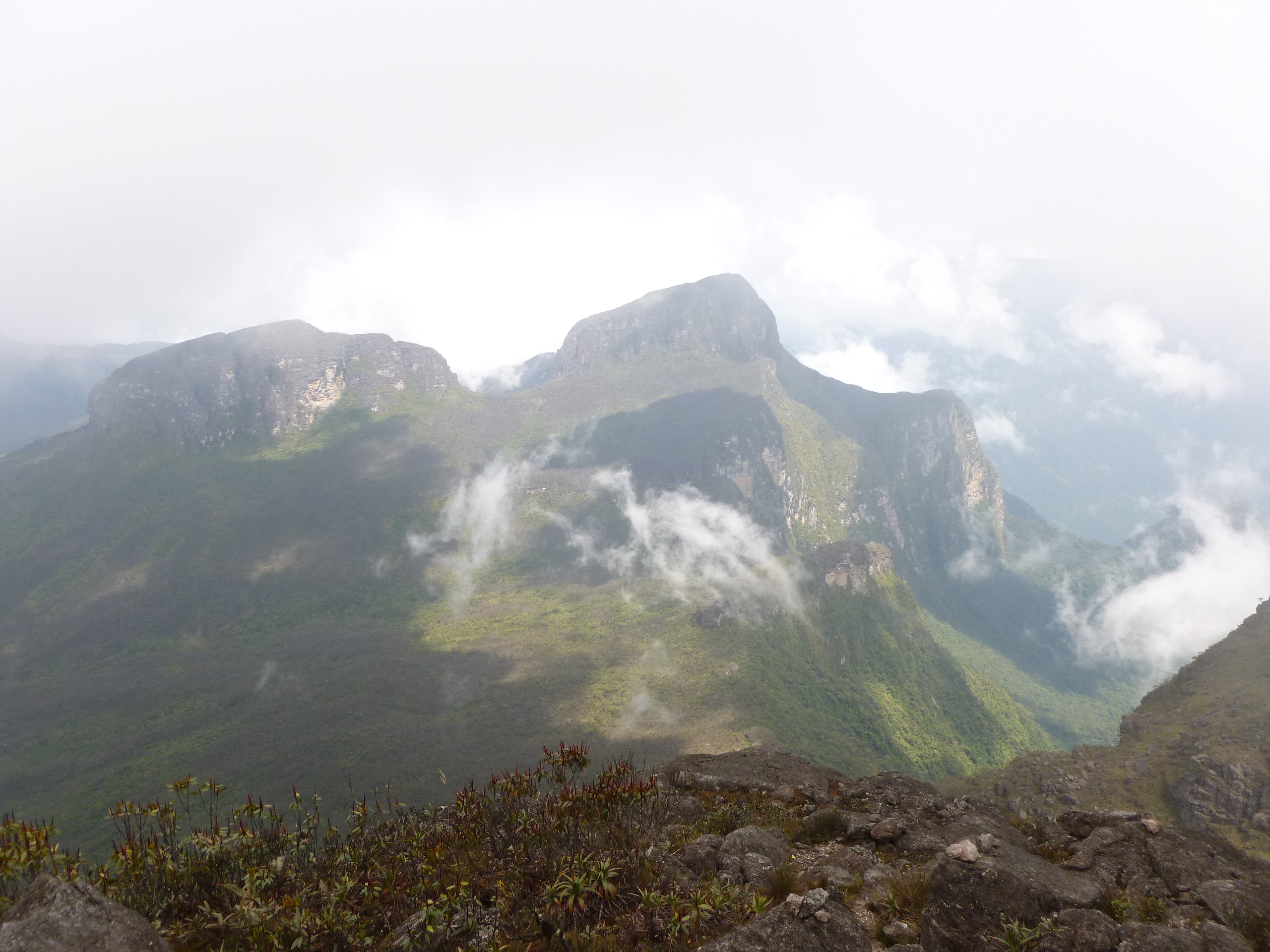
Pico 31 de Março, Brazil's second-highest summit, on the Brazil–Venezuela boundary beside Pico da Neblina.

Although the Neblina massif crosses the Brazil–Venezuela frontier, Pico da Neblina itself lies about 687 m (2,254 ft) inside Brazil.

Less than one kilometre away, Pico 31 de Março rises directly on the international boundary. At 2,974.18 m (9,758 ft), it is Brazil's second-highest summit and stands 21.12 m (69.3 ft) below Pico da Neblina. Both summits rise from the highest part of the Serra do Imeri.

Pico da Neblina is the highest point of the Guiana Shield and the highest point in South America east of the Andean cordilleras. Calling it the highest mountain in South America "outside the Andes" is less exact because Colombia's Sierra Nevada de Santa Marta, physically separate from the main Andean cordilleras, rises above 5,700 m (18,700 ft).

=== Elevation measurements ===
For decades, Pico da Neblina was given an elevation of 3,014.1 m (9,889 ft), based on a barometric measurement made in the 1960s by the Ministry of Foreign Affairs' First Boundary Demarcation Commission.

In 2004, a team from the Brazilian Institute of Geography and Statistics and the Instituto Militar de Engenharia returned to the summit with geodetic GPS equipment as part of the Projeto Pontos Culminantes, which remeasured Brazil's highest mountains. Their measurement gave Pico da Neblina an elevation of 2,993.78 m (9,822 ft), about 20 m (66 ft) below the value then in use.

A new conversion of the 2004 GPS observations in 2016 raised the calculated elevation to 2,995.30 m (9,827 ft) without another climb. GPS measures height against a mathematical model of the Earth's shape, while an elevation tied to sea level also depends on a model of the Earth's gravity field. Applying MAPGEO2015 added 1.52 m (4.99 ft) to the earlier result. Pico 31 de Março received the same correction, from 2,972.66 m (9,753 ft) to 2,974.18 m (9,758 ft). The mountains themselves had not risen.

IBGE replaced MAPGEO2015 with hgeoHNOR2020 in 2021, a model that converts GNSS measurements into the normal heights used by the Brazilian Geodetic System. The official elevation of Pico da Neblina remains 2,995.30 m (9,827 ft).

== Geology and topography ==
=== Geology ===
Pico da Neblina rises from the western Guiana Shield, part of the ancient Amazonian Craton. The Neblina massif lies near the southern edge of the Pantepui highlands, separated from other high mountain blocks of the Guiana Shield by much lower ground. It extends for about 50 km (31 mi) from north to south and 20 km (12 mi) from east to west, with most of the massif in Venezuela.

The upper mountain rests on ancient crystalline rock and is built largely from the Neblina Formation, with quartz-rich sandstone, quartzite and conglomeratic rock, some of it altered by metamorphism. The quartz-rich beds wear away more slowly than the surrounding rock, leaving cliffs and narrow ridges.

The Neblina rocks were once grouped with the Roraima Supergroup, whose sandstones form many of the table mountains farther north, but they belong to a younger sedimentary basin. The Roraima sequence contains volcanic material dated to about 1.87 billion years ago and had been cut by mafic intrusions by about 1.78 billion years ago. The Neblina sediments accumulated afterward from material eroded from older belts to the east and northeast.

Deformation of parts of the western basin around 1.33 billion years ago tilted the rock layers near Pico da Neblina steeply. Erosion then left the harder beds standing along the summit ridge. Pico da Neblina is a hogback, a narrow ridge formed along these steeply inclined layers.

=== Relief ===
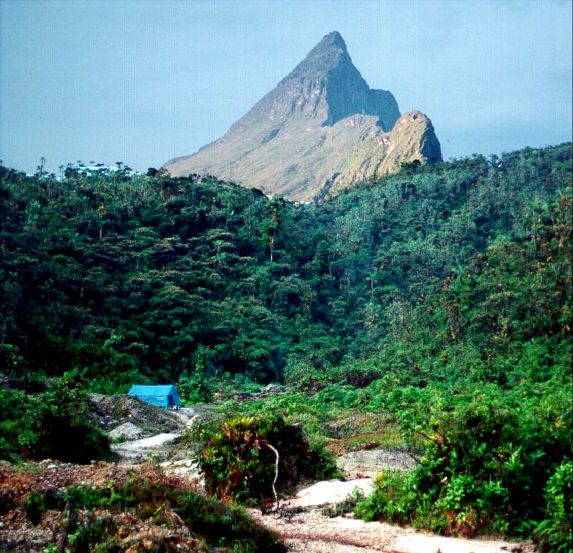
Pico da Neblina in 1998, with Pico 31 de Março behind it.

Pico da Neblina rises from the Amazon-Orinoco divide, a mountain belt running roughly southwest to northeast across the northern edge of Amazonas. High plateaus are cut by steep slopes, escarpments and closely spaced stream valleys. Much of the ground immediately south of the mountains lies only 100 to 250 m (330 to 820 ft) above sea level.

Near the mouth of the Tucano River, the southeastern side of the massif lies only about 50 m (160 ft) above sea level. From there the ground rises to 2,400 m (7,900 ft) at the top of Cachoeira do Anta before reaching the highest ridges. Pico da Neblina rises more than 2,900 m (9,500 ft) above some nearby lowlands.

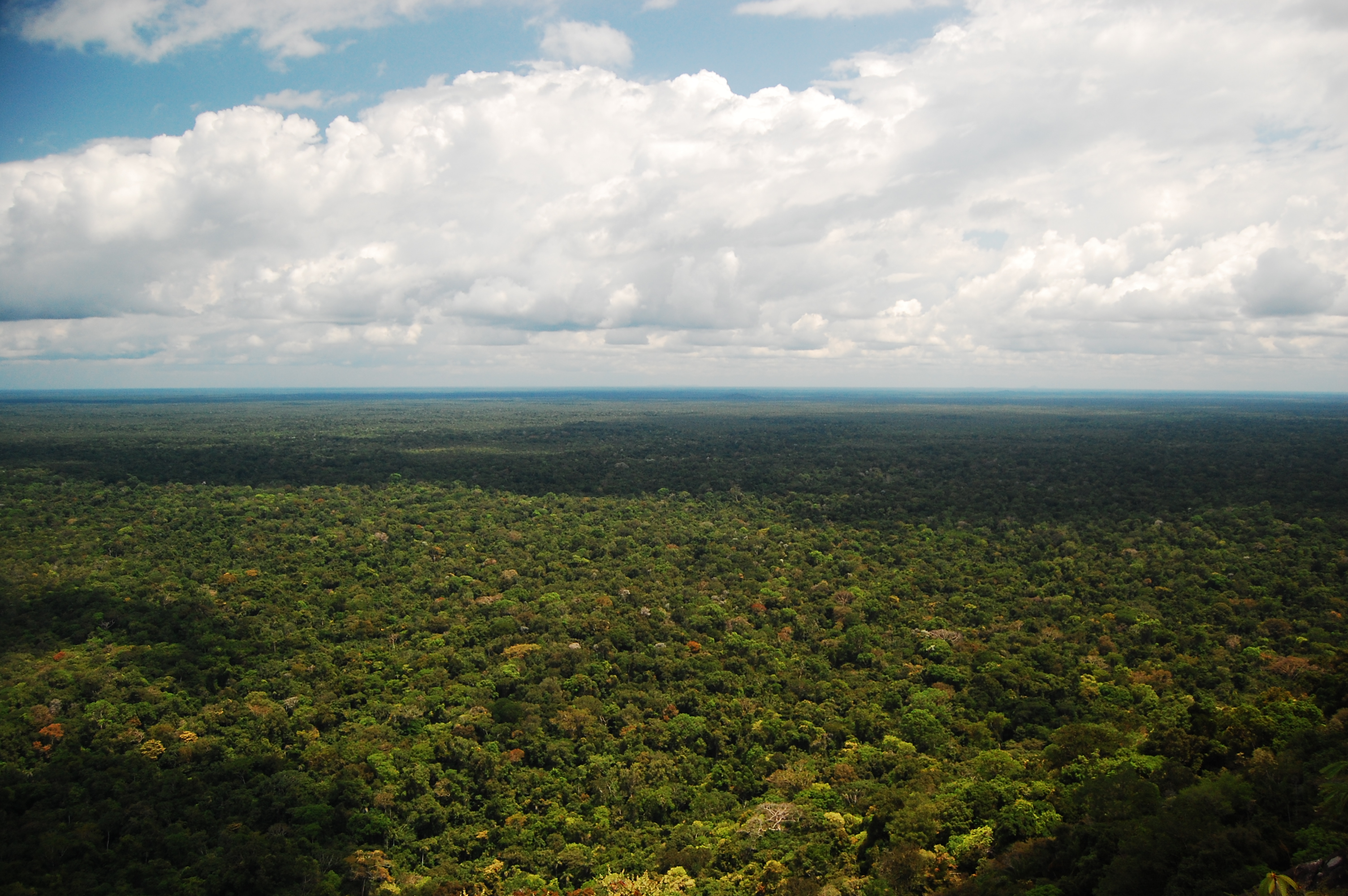
View from the upper Pico da Neblina area across the forested country below.

Broad stretches of high ground between about 2,000 and 2,400 m (6,600 and 7,900 ft) are broken by valleys and rock walls. Unlike the broad, flat-topped tepuis found elsewhere in the Guiana Highlands, Neblina has been deeply cut by erosion, with Pico da Neblina rising from the southern edge of the plateau as a narrow crest.

Pico 31 de Março rises beside it from the same high ground. A saddle separates the summits, and the international boundary crosses Pico 31 de Março before continuing through the massif. From some directions the two peaks merge into the same ridge, although Pico da Neblina rises 21.12 m (69.3 ft) higher.

Farther north, on the Venezuelan side, the plateau spreads more widely before breaking into cliffs and deeply cut valleys. Cañon Grande reaches into the massif and carries the headwaters of the Río Mawarinuma.

=== Drainage and erosion ===
The crest of the Serra do Imeri forms part of the divide between the Amazon and Orinoco basins. Water flowing south enters tributaries of the Rio Negro and then the Amazon River, while streams on the northern side descend toward the Orinoco.

The Cauaburis drains much of the Brazilian side below Pico da Neblina, and the national park also contains the headwaters of the Yá-Mirim, Yá, Maiá, Marauiá and Ariabu rivers. Their tributaries cut a dense network of channels through the mountain belt.

Rain and running water have carved escarpments, waterfalls and steep-sided valleys into the upper rock. Harder quartz-rich beds remain as cliffs and ridges while weaker material wears away around them. Cachoeira do Anta falls from the high ground on the Brazilian side, while Cañon Grande cuts deeply into the Venezuelan plateau.

=== Climate ===
Below about 500 m (1,600 ft), mean annual temperatures remain above 24 °C (75 °F). Between 500 and 1,500 m (1,600 and 4,900 ft), they fall to about 18 to 24 °C (64 to 75 °F), then to 12 to 18 °C (54 to 64 °F) higher on the slopes and about 8 to 12 °C (46 to 54 °F) in the highest belt.

The lowlands receive about 3,000 mm (118 in) of rain each year, with no dry season and average relative humidity of about 85 to 90 percent. Rainfall increases up the slopes toward about 1,800 m (5,900 ft), while mist supplies more moisture at higher elevations and humidity approaches saturation.

Cloud can cover the upper mountain for long periods, keeping rock, vegetation and soil wet. Water collects in shallow hollows across the high ground, where saturated soil and peat lie among exposed rock. The Bacia do Gelo, above 2,000 m (6,600 ft) below the summit ridge, is one such hollow.

== Flora and fauna ==
=== Vegetation ===
Almost three vertical kilometres separate the Amazonian lowlands from the summit. Below about 600 m (2,000 ft), tall rainforest covers much of the lower ground. Campinarana grows on pale, nutrient-poor sands near the lowest elevations, while terra firme forest, waterlogged chavascal and narrow strips of igapó occur around the Cauaburis lowlands. In one two-hectare area of lowland forest, researchers counted at least 229 tree species from 45 families. Eperua leucantha and Hevea cf. brasiliensis together made up 29 percent of the trees.

Between about 600 and 2,000 m (2,000 and 6,600 ft), montane forest covers the ridges and plateaus, with shorter trees where slopes are steep or soils are thin. Bromeliads, lichens and fungi become common above about 1,000 m (3,300 ft), with patches of bamboo in the wet evergreen forest. Where rock breaks through the forest, shrubs, grasses, orchids and carnivorous plants grow under frequent rain, mist and wind.

The conifer Podocarpus acuminatus grows from southern Venezuela into the Serra da Neblina, while Heliamphora neblinae occurs in the Venezuelan highlands and the Serra da Neblina in northern Brazil.

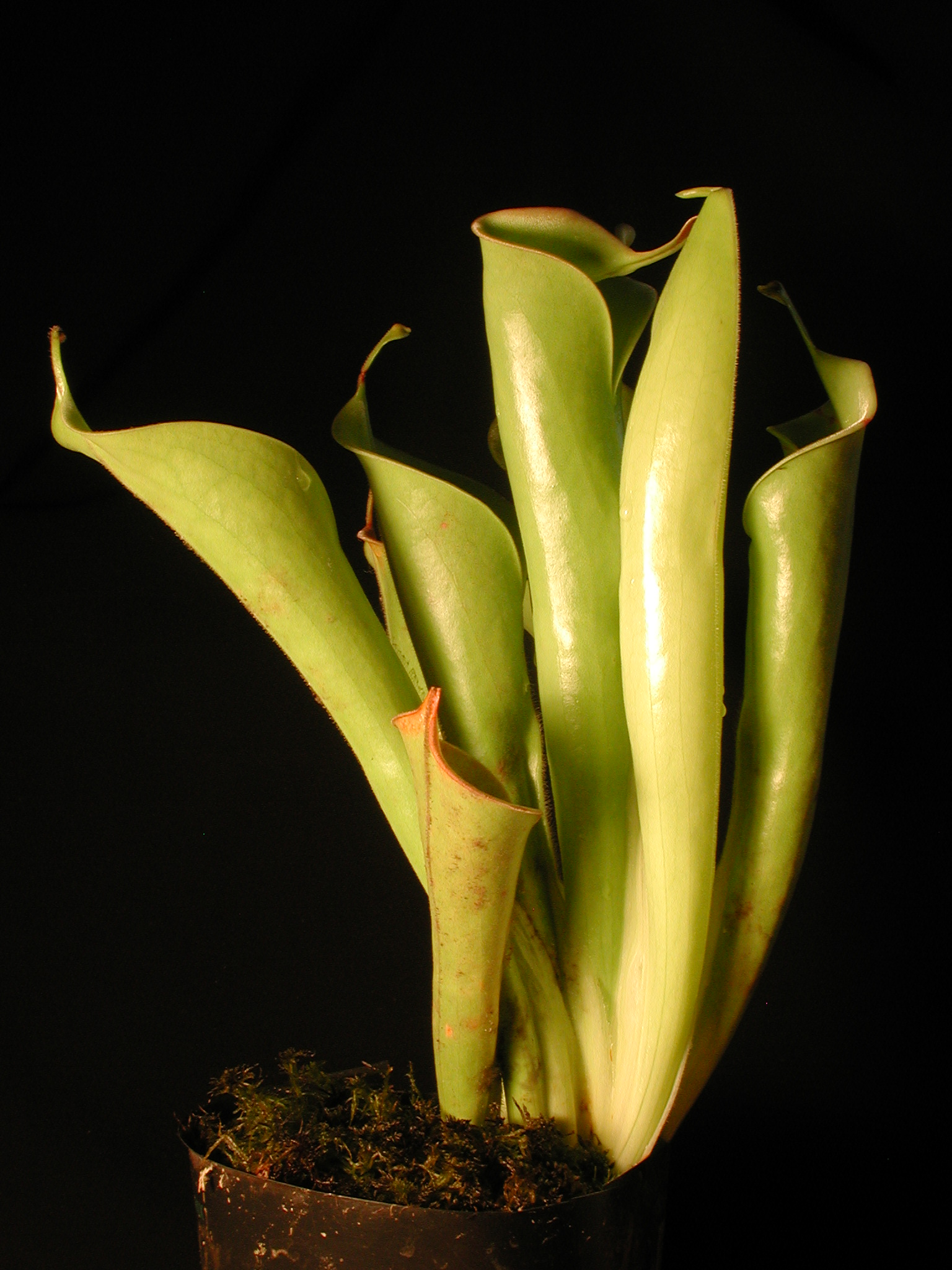
Heliamphora tatei, a carnivorous pitcher plant of the upper Neblina massif.

Above about 2,400 m (7,900 ft), trees give way to low shrubs and herbs growing among exposed rock, shallow soil, peat and wet hollows. One of these hollows is the Bacia do Gelo, above 2,000 m (6,600 ft), where the carnivorous pitcher plant Heliamphora tatei grows in saturated soil. Saxofridericia compressa and Bonnetia neblinae grow nearby, while Macairea neblinae is endemic to the Serra da Neblina.

Twenty-seven fern and lycophyte species collected on the Brazilian side in 2003 and 2004 had not previously been found elsewhere in Brazil. Collections around the Bacia do Gelo and near the summit in 2012 added 23 taxa to those then known from Brazil. The fern Sticherus brevitomentosus had not been found in Brazil before a specimen was collected at Igarapé Cuiabixi at 2,060 m (6,760 ft) in 2012. Two species of Mandevilla, M. neblinensis and M. yanomamii, were named from the Pico da Neblina area in 2026.

=== Animals ===
Animal communities change sharply with elevation. At least 529 spider species from 39 families were found between 100 and 2,400 m (330 and 7,870 ft). Around 1,550 m (5,090 ft), the mix of species begins to change sharply. Communities at 2,000 and 2,400 m (6,600 and 7,900 ft) differ strongly from those lower on the mountain. Seven species of the orb-weaving genus Chrysometa from Pico da Neblina were new to science when named in 2011, and most came from middle or high elevations.

Larger mammals live in forests below the high plateaus. Jaguars, pumas, South American tapirs and bush dogs have been found in the national park. Black uakaris eat mainly seeds and unripe fruit and have been observed feeding on at least 120 plant species. Eperua leucantha, Hevea cf. brasiliensis and Micrandra sprucei are among the trees they use most often.

Two tiny frogs live on the upper massif. Neblinaphryne mayeri and Caligophryne doylei were named in 2024. Each belongs to a lineage distinct enough to have its own genus and family, Neblinaphrynidae and Caligophrynidae. Their nearest living relatives diverged from them more than 45 million years ago.

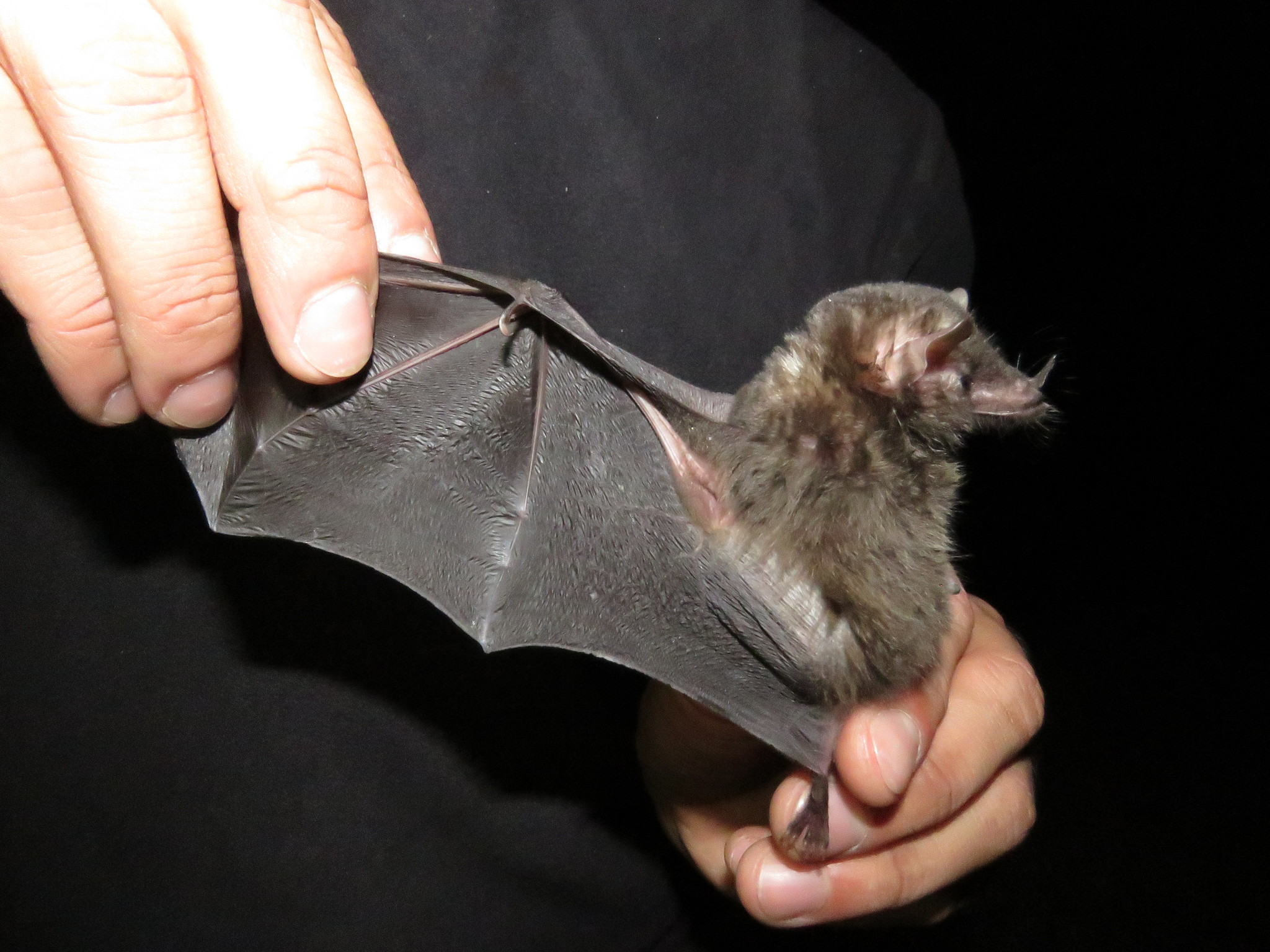
Geoffroy's tailless bat (Anoura geoffroyi), a nectar-feeding bat that visits flowers on the Neblina massif.

Flowers on the high slopes support their own pollinators. Between about 1,850 and 2,100 m (6,070 and 6,890 ft) on the Venezuelan side, native bees pollinate Heliamphora tatei, Saxofridericia compressa and other plants. The buff-breasted sabrewing drinks nectar from the orange-red flowers of Psittacanthus montis-neblinae, while Geoffroy's tailless bat visits Macrocarpaea neblinae.

== Human history and exploration ==
=== Yanomami knowledge of Yaripo ===
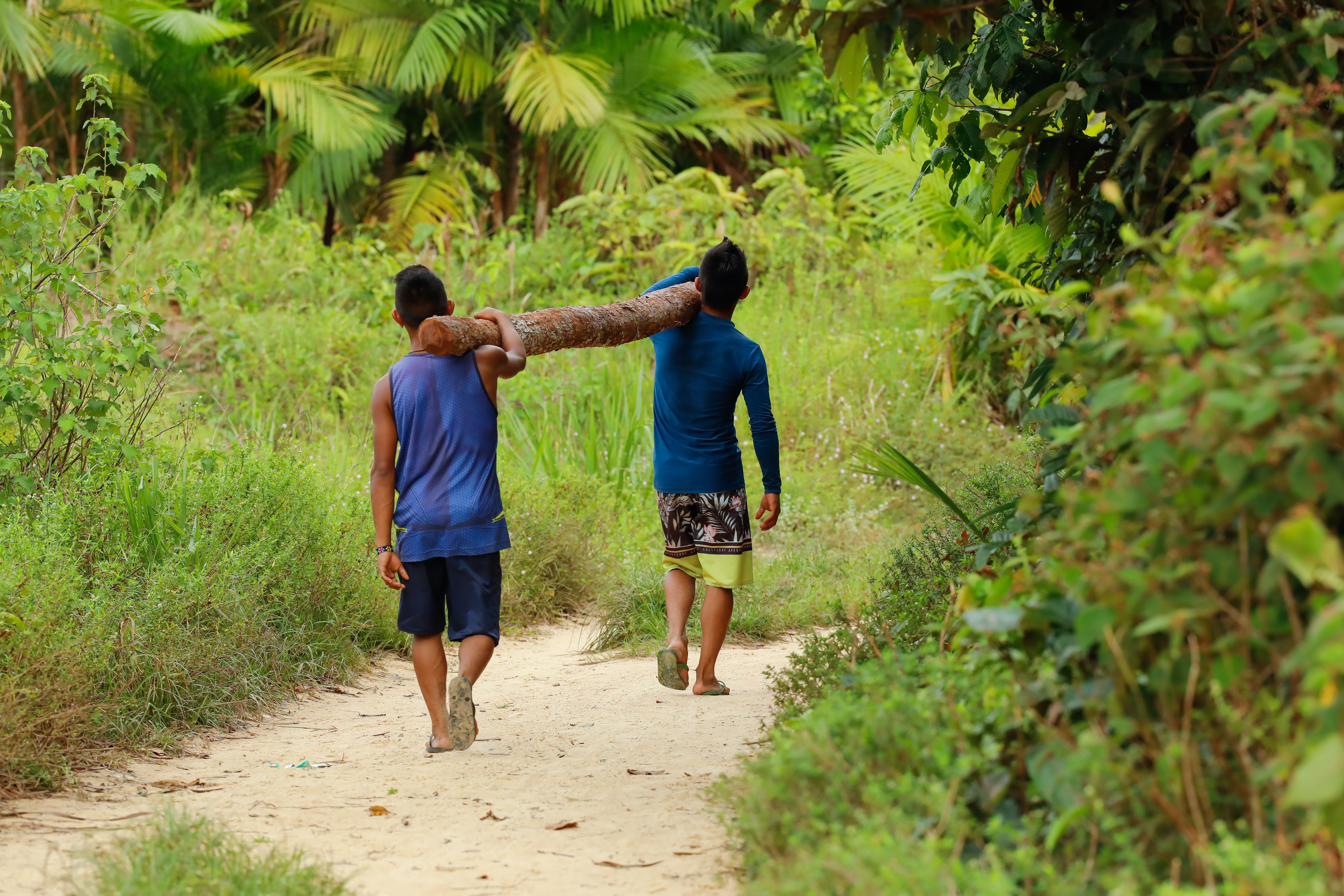
Yanomami people at Maturacá in 2021. Maturacá is on the approach to Yaripo and is the base community for the Yanomami-led visitation program.

Long before surveyors and naturalists reached the upper mountain, Yanomami communities travelled through the country around Yaripo. Some paths toward the summit follow old migration routes. Along the way are former dwelling sites, hunting and food-gathering grounds, shelters, lakes and places related to hekura spirits.

Yaripo is sacred in Yanomami belief and is understood as a dwelling place of spirits. Yanomami park councillor Salomão Mendonça Ramos recounted the story of Yoyoma, a great shaman who came to know Yaripo through a spiritual vision. Sacred sites lie along the route toward the summit and on the mountain itself. Shamans refer to Yaripo in rituals concerning spirits and forces of the natural world.

=== Early outside observations ===
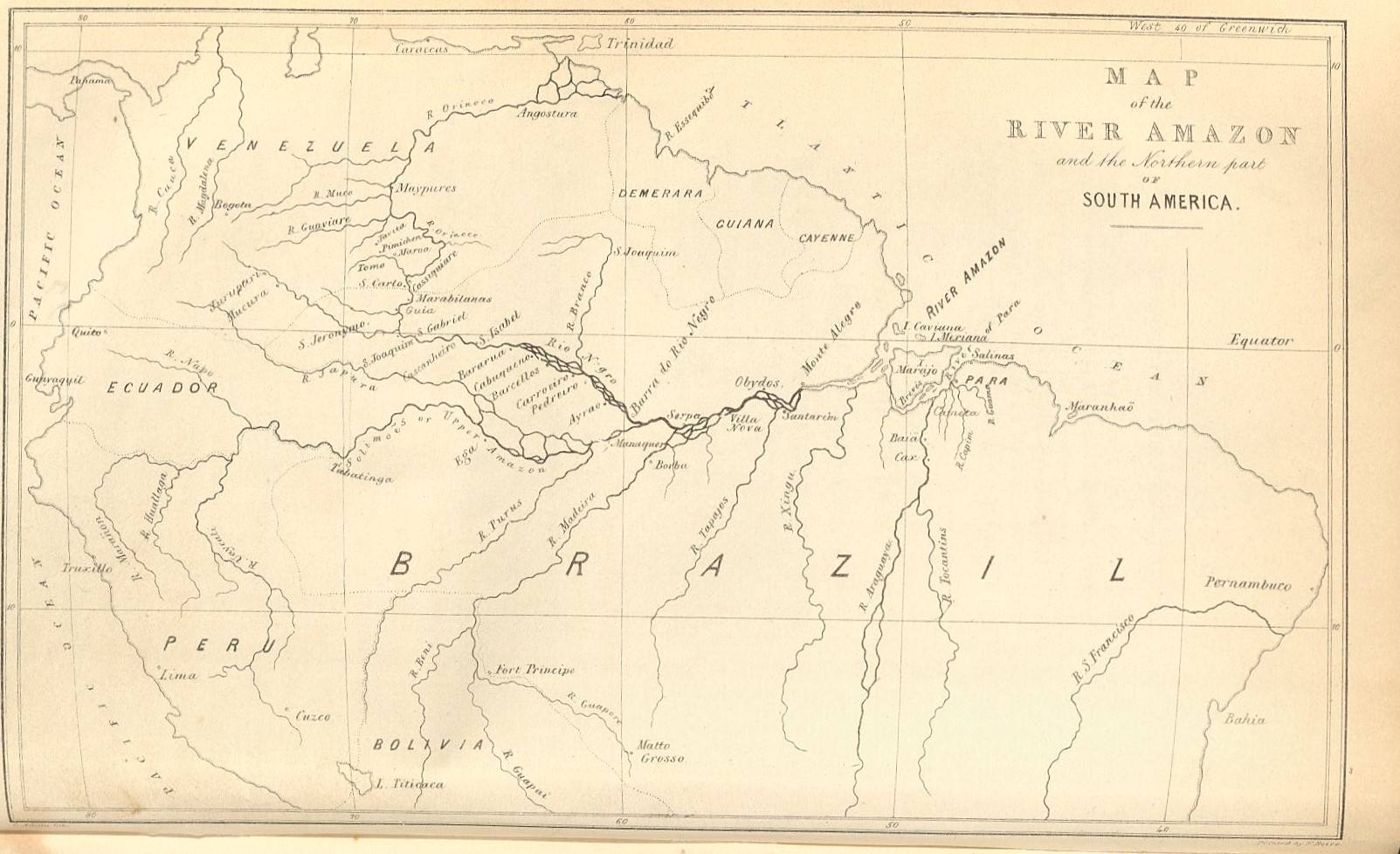
Map of the Amazon and Rio Negro published by Alfred Russel Wallace in 1853. Wallace wrote of seeing the "serras of the Cababurís" near Marabitanas.

European naturalists may have seen the Neblina massif in the nineteenth century. Alfred Russel Wallace, travelling on the Rio Negro, wrote in 1853 that he had come in sight of the "serras of the Cababurís" near Marabitanas. Richard Spruce also saw a distant ridge with steep escarpments from the upper Rio Negro. Botanist John F. Pruski interpreted these observations, and an earlier one by Robert Hermann Schomburgk, as probable sightings of what is now the Serra da Neblina, although the old geographical names and positions do not fit present maps neatly.

On 12 March 1952, the mountains were seen from the air. Brazilian botanist Ricardo de Lemos Fróis was flying from Tapuruocara, now Santa Isabel do Rio Negro, toward Mercês when he saw a mountain range that he estimated at about 3,000 m (9,800 ft). The Panair do Brasil Catalina was flown by Richer and Mário Jucá. Fróis thought the mountains belonged to the old Serra do Caburi and wrote that people along the Rio Negro already knew of them.

=== Expeditions and boundary work ===
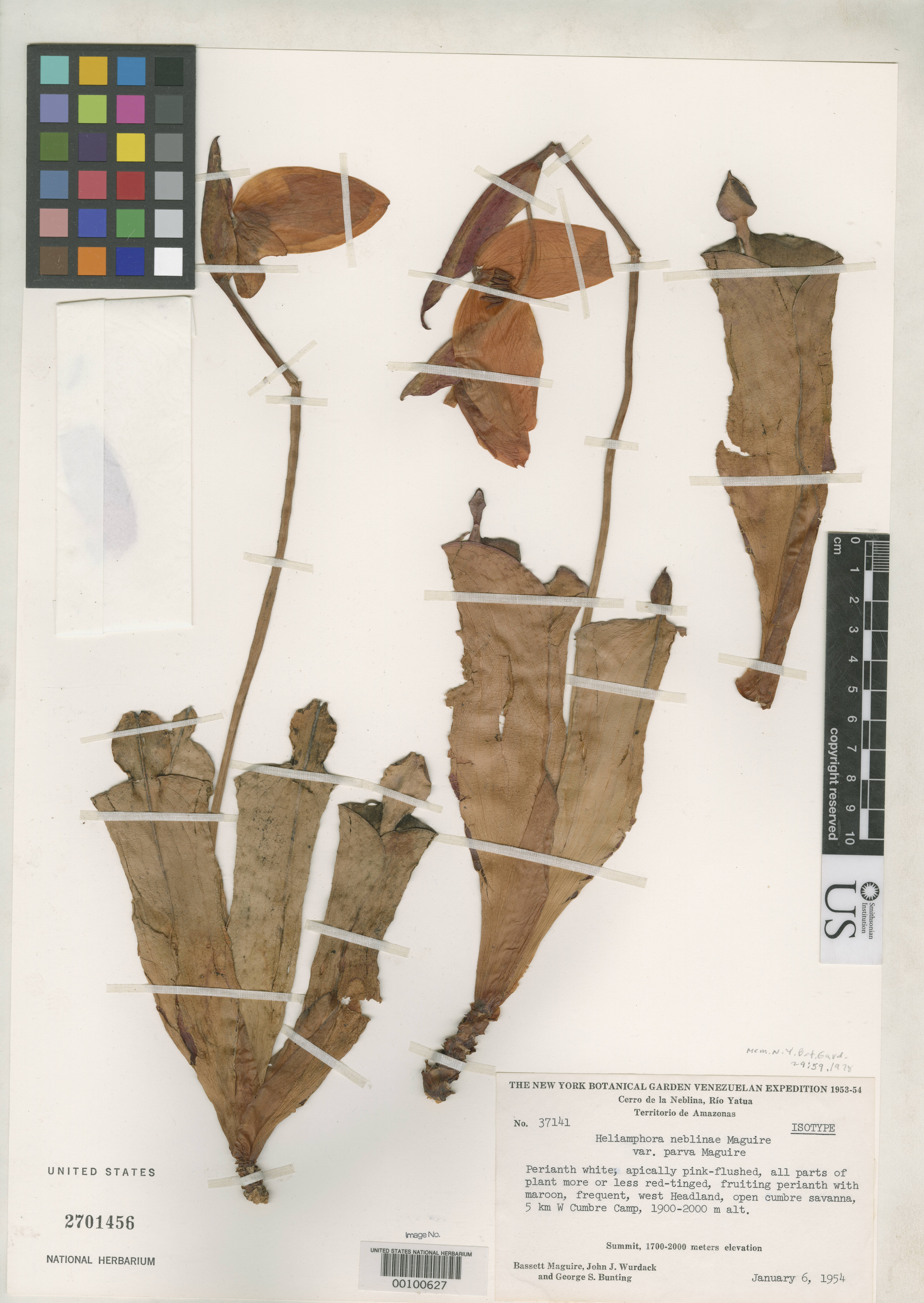
Herbarium specimen collected by Bassett Maguire on Cerro de la Neblina on 6 January 1954 during the 1953–54 botanical expedition.

Bassett Maguire, John J. Wurdack and George S. Bunting entered the Pacimoni and Yatua basins in November 1953 and spent the following months exploring Cerro de la Neblina. By 27 December they had climbed to the upper escarpment, between about 1,600 and 1,800 m (5,200 and 5,900 ft). Early in January 1954 they reached open highland vegetation near Cumbre Camp at about 1,900 m (6,200 ft).

A separate expedition financed by Venezuelan ornithologist William H. Phelps Jr. left Caracas on 2 January 1954. It travelled through the upper Orinoco country and entered the Río Pacimoni on 5 January. Alexander Wetmore and James H. Kempton stayed at a lowland camp, while Phelps, geologist Charles D. Reynolds and the mountain party continued toward Neblina and joined Maguire's group.

In 1955, Maguire and Reynolds published Cerro de la Neblina, Amazonas, Venezuela: A Newly Discovered Sandstone Mountain. Fróis rejected the idea that the mountain had only just become known, citing his 1952 flight and knowledge of the Serra do Caburi among people living in the Rio Negro region.

Maguire and Wurdack returned between October 1957 and January 1958 and worked on the high plateau west of Cumbre Camp. On 17 December 1957, Maguire, Wurdack and Celia K. Maguire collected plants at the eastern head of Cañon Grande at 1,900 to 2,000 m (6,200 to 6,600 ft). Their 1959 paper examined the position of Cerro de la Neblina in relation to the Brazil–Venezuela frontier.

Brazilian and Venezuelan boundary teams approached the massif from the Brazilian side in 1964. The expedition passed through Maturacá and followed the Cauaburis basin before climbing from the Rio Tucano. On 22 April the party reached the international boundary at about 1,700 m (5,600 ft). Work continued along higher stretches of the frontier, between about 1,800 and 2,200 m (5,900 and 7,200 ft), later that month.

=== Summit and scientific expeditions ===
Brazilian topographer José Ambrósio de Miranda Pombo made the first known ascent of Pico da Neblina in 1965. Pombo worked on the Brazil–Venezuela boundary and led the first expedition known to have reached the summit. The First Boundary Demarcation Commission also measured the summit during the 1960s. Its barometric measurement gave an elevation of 3,014.1 m (9,889 ft), which remained in official use for nearly four decades.

Bassett Maguire returned in October 1965 with a party that included Brazilian botanist João Murça Pires and Julian Alfred Steyermark. The expedition stayed in the Neblina region until February 1966. On 2 December 1965, Maguire, Pires and Celia K. Maguire collected plants between about 2,600 and 2,700 m (8,500 and 8,900 ft) on the Brazilian side.

A Brazilian expedition in 1991 spent about twenty days around the Bacia do Gelo, collecting biological specimens on the upper mountain.

In 2016, Yanomami guides returned to the summit with a group from ICMBio, Funai and partner organisations for an ethnomapping expedition. The ten-day journey followed old routes through the forest and revisited former settlements, resting places and sacred sites on the way to Yaripo. The group mapped Yanomami routes and place names, which were then used in work on the national park and Indigenous Territory.

== Climbing and access ==
=== Route ===
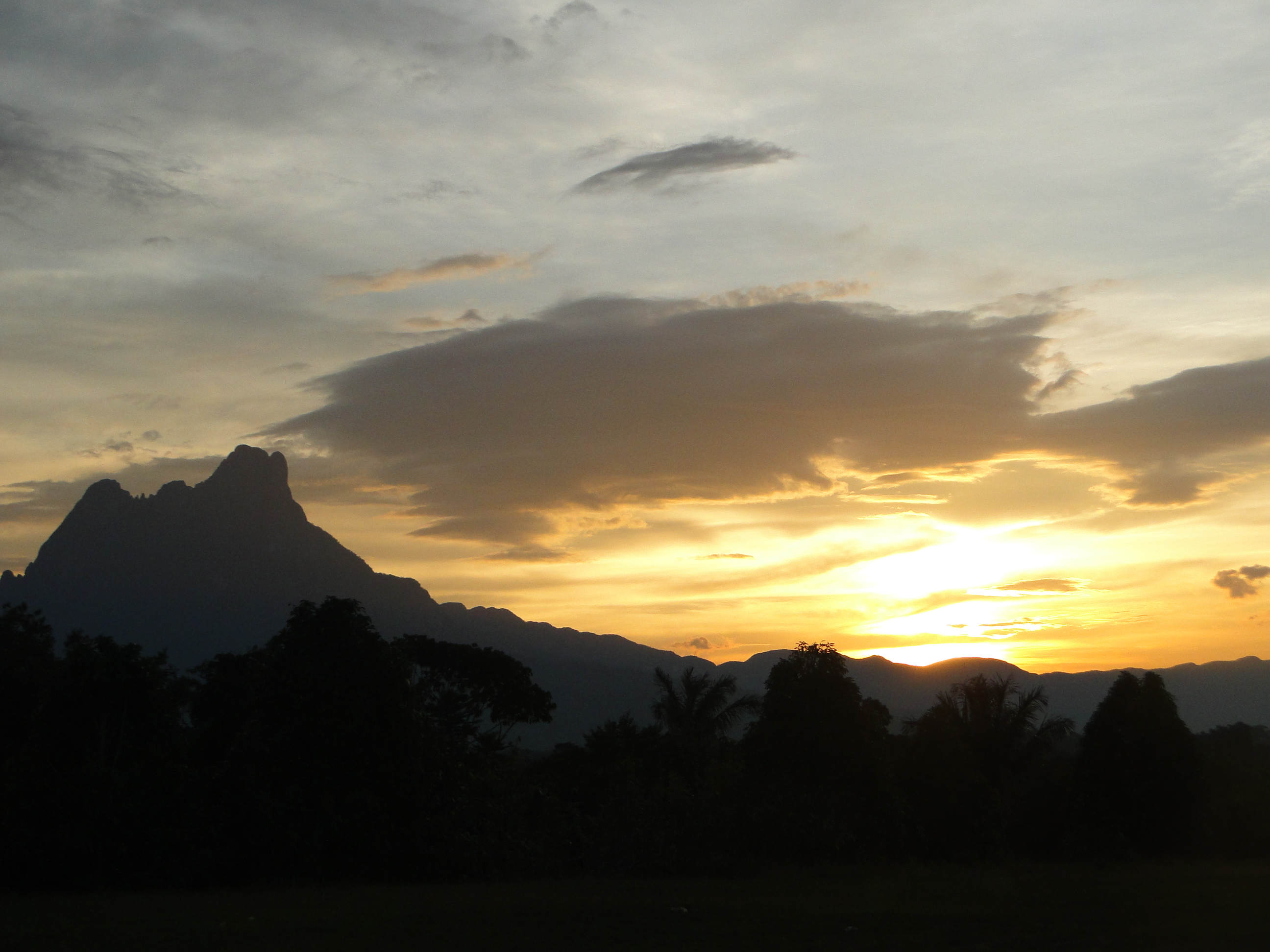
Maturacá, the Yanomami community reached during the approach to Pico da Neblina.

Expeditions leave São Gabriel da Cachoeira by four-wheel-drive vehicle and follow about 85 to 88 km (53 to 55 mi) of unpaved BR-307 to Frente-Sul on the Yá-Mirim stream. Motorboats then take about six hours to reach Maturacá. The next morning, the journey continues for about two hours up the Cauaburis River to Porto Tucano, where the walking trail begins.

The walking route covers about 70 km (43 mi) round trip. Much of it passes under closed forest across wet, steadily rising ground. Walking days often last six to eight hours, and nights are spent in hammocks at simple camps near drinking water.

The trail passes camps named Irokae, Gavião, Bebedouro Novo and Laje before reaching Areal below the summit. Under the 2026 itinerary, the walk from Laje to Areal takes about eight hours. Climbers attempt the summit the next day, with another eight hours allowed for the ascent and return to Areal.

The final ascent gains about 1,000 m (3,300 ft) in a few hours. Forest gives way to wet high ground and exposed rock, with short sections requiring climbers to scramble over rock. Ropes and metal steps have been installed on parts of the upper route, and work on steps toward the summit formed part of the 2026 trail preparations.

The route is difficult mainly because of its length, steep wet trails, mud and isolation. Sustained technical rock climbing is not required, but summit day comes after days of walking through the forest. The descent passes Bebedouro Novo and Irokae again before the group returns by boat to Maturacá and then to São Gabriel da Cachoeira. The 2026 itinerary takes eleven days.

=== Safety and emergency response ===
Reaching Pico da Neblina requires several days of travel by road, river and forest trail, leaving climbers far from hospitals and conventional rescue services by the time they reach the upper mountain. Authorized operators must have a rescue plan for remote terrain, while visitors need a medical certificate and travel insurance covering medical care and rescue and must acknowledge the risks of the expedition.

In 2023, ICMBio and partner organisations held a ten-day wilderness first-aid and rescue course for Yanomami guides from the Yaripo project, with training focused on emergencies in isolated terrain.

A 2015 expedition that spent three days at the summit required extra logistical support because little water was available there.

An ICMBio expedition from 26 January to 6 February 2026 inspected the trail and camps and worked on reducing accident risks along the ascent. Expedition teams carry satellite communication equipment, and Starlink internet was added for field communication in 2026.

=== Closure and reopening ===
Tourist climbs began in the 1980s, and growing traffic into the park brought disputes over entry into Yanomami territory, the distribution of tourism income and damage along the route. Tourist access was suspended in 2003 after a recommendation from the Federal Public Prosecutor's Office.

In 2013, the Associação Yanomami do Rio Cauaburis e Afluentes, AYRCA, asked ICMBio and Funai to prepare new rules for visits. Yanomami leaders and community members spent the next four years drawing up the Yaripo visitation plan, with the Associação das Mulheres Yanomami Kumirayoma, AMYK, also taking part. The plan was completed in July 2017, approved by ICMBio in May 2018 and accepted by Funai in September 2019.

Commercial trips were due to begin in 2020, but the COVID-19 pandemic delayed the reopening. The first paying group under the new arrangement left São Gabriel da Cachoeira in March 2022. Five expeditions carried 43 paying visitors between March and July that year. By April 2024, nine commercial expeditions had taken 73 paying visitors to the mountain.

Funai renewed its consent for the Yaripo visitation plan in June 2026 for another three years.

=== Yaripo ecotourism ===
Tour operators taking visitors to Yaripo need authorization from ICMBio and consent from AYRCA and AMYK, and each group is limited to ten visitors.

Yanomami teams handle much of the journey through the Indigenous Territory. Boat pilots carry visitors along the rivers, while guides, cooks and porters accompany the walk and look after the camps. The route does not enter Yanomami villages, which community leaders kept outside the tourist itinerary because the communities had not agreed to receive visitors there.

At Maturacá, before the group leaves for the trail, Yanomami elders lead a protection ritual that gives visitors permission to enter the sacred country of Yaripo and asks for protection during the journey.

Inside the Indigenous Territory, visitors must stay on the agreed route and may not hunt, fish, collect plants or stones, carry alcohol or firearms, or leave waste behind. The park administration may stop expeditions when conditions become unsafe, and Funai may request that access through Yanomami territory be suspended.

== Conservation ==
Most of the Neblina massif remains in good condition, but illegal gold mining, hunting, fishing, unauthorized occupation along BR-307 and uncontrolled entry have damaged parts of the national park.

Gold miners worked at the Bacia do Gelo, above 2,000 m (6,600 ft) beneath the summit ridge, around the early 2000s. The disturbed ground had not recovered by 2022, and mining also damaged ground around the trail to Pico da Neblina and elsewhere in the mountains.

Streams near mining sites have been diverted or filled with sediment, damaging water quality and aquatic habitat. Most headwaters elsewhere in the park are in good condition. The extent of mercury contamination around Pico da Neblina had not been established when the 2022 management plan was completed, and the plan called for tests of headwaters and Indigenous residents. Elsewhere in the Yanomami Indigenous Territory, mercury and other heavy metals released by mining have contaminated rivers, soil and animals used for food. Mercury from artisanal gold mining can become methylmercury in water and soil and accumulate through the food chain.

After communities around Maturacá reported mining in the area, a joint operation in March 2023 crossed more than 90 km (56 mi) of trail through the national park and Yanomami territory. In June 2025, another operation used satellite imagery to find clandestine routes and disturbed ground before teams travelled through the Cauaburis, Tucano, Maricibueri and Titiricô river areas and dismantled illegal mining structures.

Elsewhere in the Yanomami Indigenous Territory, clandestine and seized airstrips have supplied illegal mines in areas unreachable by road. In February 2023, the federal government began an operation intended to remove more than 20,000 illegal miners from Yanomami territory. By 2024, the Primeiro Comando da Capital was also involved in illegal gold mining in remote Indigenous areas of the northern Amazon. United Nations human-rights bodies have called on Brazil to stop illegal mining in Indigenous lands and have raised concern about violations affecting Yanomami communities.

BR-307 gives access to country that would otherwise be difficult to reach and has also been used for unauthorized occupation. Road building elsewhere in the Amazon has repeatedly opened remote forest to settlement and clearing. Patrols focus on BR-307, the Cauaburis and Marauiá rivers and the Inambú stream, which are used to enter the park, while hunting and fishing add pressure in accessible areas.

An expedition in 2011 removed plaques fixed to rocks on the summit. In 2015, Yanomami and ICMBio workers returned to remove litter, bolts and plate bases, erase graffiti and collect spent rifle cartridges and other debris.

Under the Yaripo visitation system, groups remain on an agreed trail, group size is limited and visitors must carry their waste out of the Indigenous Territory. The project checks the condition of trails and camps and the effects of visitation. Guiding, boat transport, cooking and carrying provide paid work for participating Yanomami communities and an alternative to illegal mining.

Neblinaphryne mayeri has been found from 2,013 m (6,604 ft) to the 2,995 m (9,826 ft) summit, but only two of the 33 specimens in its original series were collected below 2,600 m (8,500 ft). Caligophryne doylei lives mainly around 2,000 m (6,600 ft) on the same massif. Their narrow high-elevation ranges leave them exposed to warming and disease, and other Pantepui lineages may disappear before they are found. Much of the flora and fauna at the highest elevations remains poorly documented, and the park management plan calls for more work on endemic species there.

== Cultural references and commemorations ==
João Guimarães Rosa worked at the Brazilian Foreign Ministry on boundary matters involving the Neblina region before his death in 1967. In December 1969, a 2,150 m (7,050 ft) summit in the Cordilheira Curupira on the Brazil–Venezuela frontier was named Pico Guimarães Rosa.

In 2001, photographer José de Paula Machado and writer Márcio Souza published Pico da Neblina: Origens de Nossa Civilização. The 176-page book pairs Machado's photographs of the national park with Souza's writing about the region and its Indigenous peoples.

Beginning in 2001, Brazilian Air Force infantry personnel from Manaus climbed Pico da Neblina around Flag Day, on 19 November, to replace the Brazilian flag at the summit. Reaching the top required days of travel on foot from the Maturacá area. The old flag was burned during the Flag Day ceremony and a new one raised on a 4 m (13 ft) mast at Brazil's highest point.

The mountain gave its name to the Brazilian HBO drama Pico da Neblina, which premiered in August 2019. The story is set in a fictional São Paulo after cannabis is legalized and follows Biriba, a former illegal dealer who enters the legal market. The series debuted in the United States on HBO Latino as Joint Venture on 9 August 2019. Its second season was released in 2022.

== See also ==
- Pico da Neblina National Park
- List of mountains in Brazil
- List of Brazilian states by highest point
- List of highest points of South American countries
