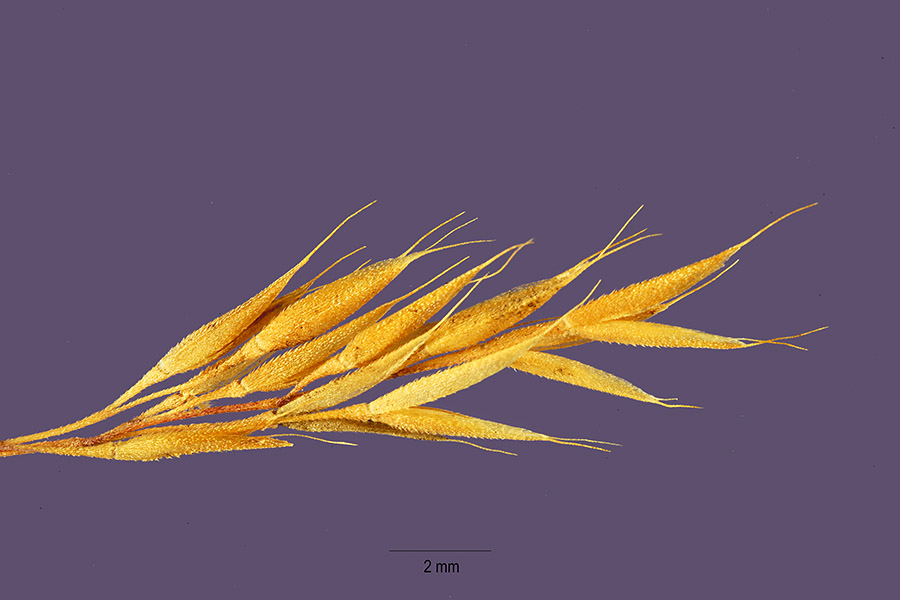
- Seedhead
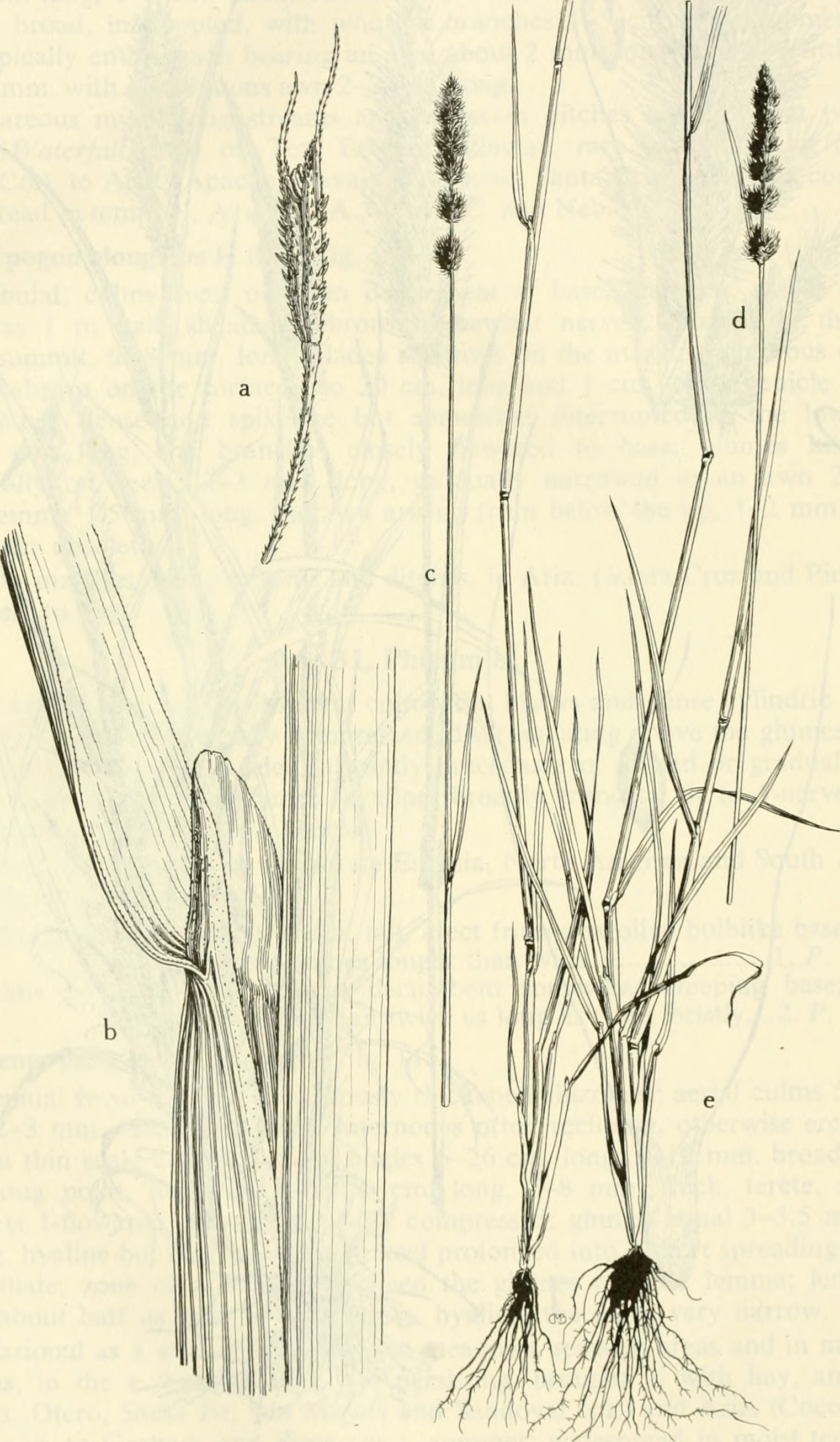
- Botanical illustration from Aquatic and Wetland Plants of Southwestern United States

Scientific classification
- Kingdom: Plantae
- Clade: Tracheophytes
- Clade: Angiosperms
- Clade: Monocots
- Clade: Commelinids
- Order: Poales
- Family: Poaceae
- Subfamily: Pooideae
- Genus: Polypogon
- Species: P. elongatus

Binomial name
- Polypogon elongatus Kunth

Synonyms
- List: Alopecurus elongatus (Kunth) Poir.; Chaetotropis elongata (Kunth) Björkman; Chaetotropis elongata var. longearistata Nicora; Chaetotropis imberbis var. bonariensis Nicora; Nowodworskya agrostoides J.Presl; Polypogon affinis Brongn.; Polypogon elongatus var. longearistatus (Nicora) Finot; Polypogon elongatus f. minor Hack.; Polypogon elongatus var. strictus É.Desv.; Polypogon inaequalis Trin.; Polypogon mexicanus Steud.; Santia elongata (Kunth) Parl. ex Webb & Berth.; Vilfa acutigluma Steud.

= Polypogon elongatus =

Species of plant

Polypogon elongatus, the streambank rabbitsfoot grass, is a species of flowering plant in the family Poaceae. It is native to the U.S. states of Colorado, Arizona, and Texas, Mexico, Central America, and nearly all of South America, except the Amazon and adjoining tropical areas. A perennial reaching 90 cm (3 ft), it is typically found growing on damp stream banks.
