= Serranía de la Neblina National Park =

National park in Venezuela

- IUCN category II (national park)
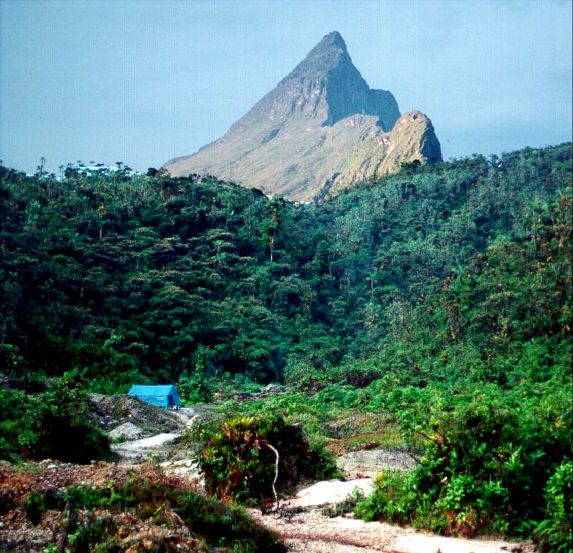

- Location within Venezuela
- Location: Amazonas (Venezuelan state)
- Coordinates: 1.240318°N 65.667819°W
- Area: 13,600 km^{2} (5,300 sq mi)
- Established: 1978

The Serranía de la Neblina National Park is a national park of Venezuela.

== Location ==
It is located in the State of Amazonas, southwest of the Parima Tapirapecó National Park. It covers the area of the Cerro de la Neblina, whose highest peak on the Venezuelan side is Pico 31 de Março at 2,992 meters above sea level. The massif extends towards Brazilian territory, where the highest point, Pico da Neblina (3,014m). On the Brazilian side there is also a national park, Pico da Neblina National Park, to preserve this ecosystem.

== Physical ==
This mountainous massif is continuously covered with clouds, giving rise to its name "La Neblina" ("the mist"). Located in the middle of the Amazon, it is the highest elevation of the region. La Serrania La Neblina is the highest tepuy, and is cut in two by the Baría Grande Canyon, one of the deepest canyons in the world. The park, along with, the Parima Tapirapecó park, forms part of the Orinoco-Casiquiare biosphere reserve.

== Environment ==
The park is in the Guayanan Highlands moist forests ecoregion.

The park has a varied endemic vegetation including one shrub, Neblinaria celiae, that exists only exists in the park. There is also a wide variety of carnivorous plants.

The park contains jaguar, tapir (Tapirus terrestris ), cunaguaro (Felis pardalis) and many different species of monkeys. Snakes are numerous, and include anacondas, bothrops and green mapanares (lachesis muta) - these last two are very poisonous.

== See also ==
- List of national parks of Venezuela
