= Coppename Bridge =

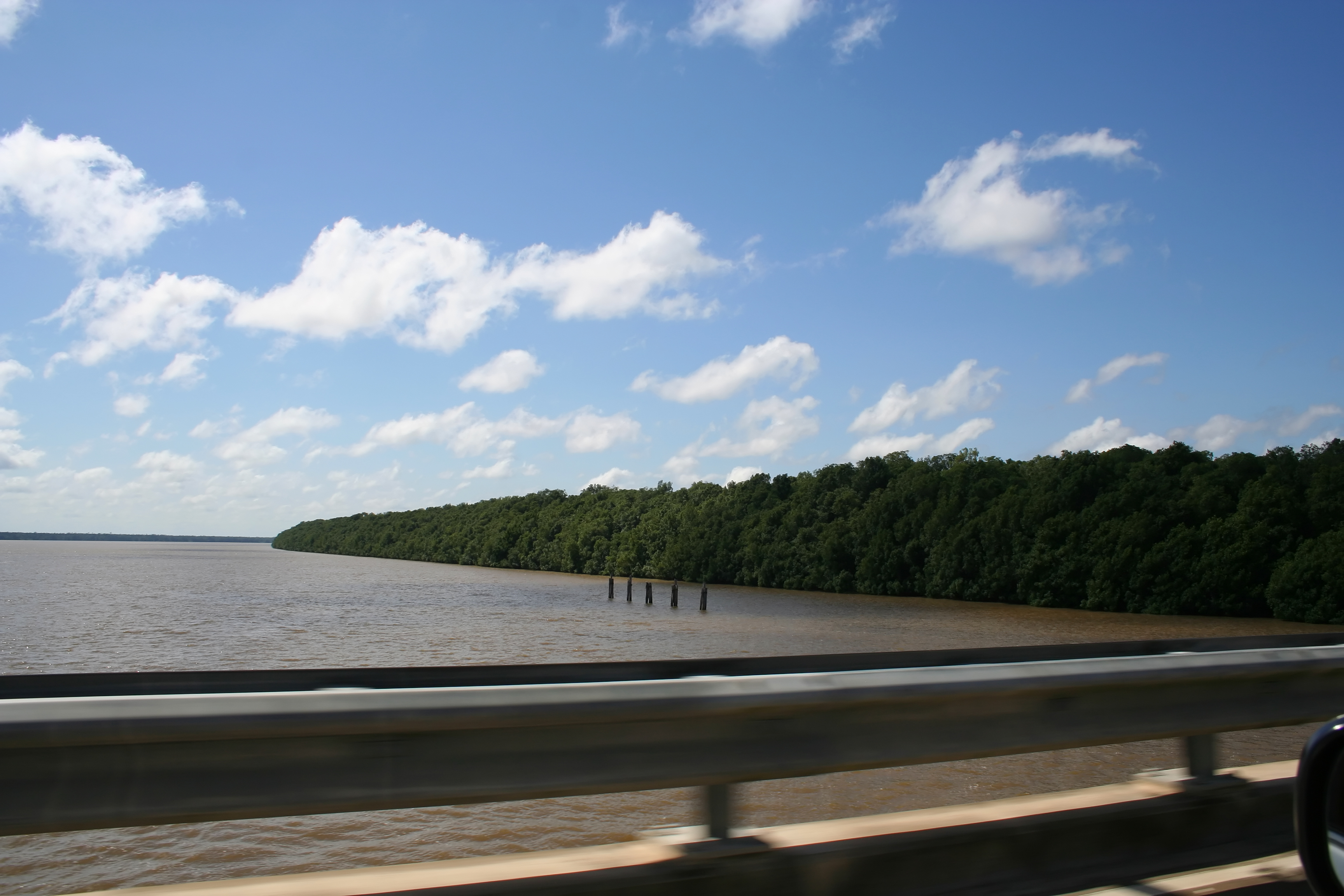
- The Coppename Bridge on the mouth of the Coppename River
- Coordinates: 5°46′19″N 55°53′45″W
- Carries: 2-lane wide highway (East-West Link)
- Crosses: Coppename River
- Locale: North-west Suriname

Characteristics
- Total length: 1,570 m

History
- Opened: 1999

Location
- Interactive map of Coppename Bridge

The Coppename Bridge (Dutch: Coppenamebrug) is a bridge over the Coppename River in Suriname, part of the East-West Link.

The bridge links Jenny in the Coronie District with Boskamp in the Saramacca District. It was opened in 1999, a year before the Jules Wijdenbosch Bridge opened in Paramaribo.

Further upstream there is a second (Bailey) bridge over the Coppename River, near Bitagron, built in the 1970s.
