= Friendship, Suriname =

Friendship
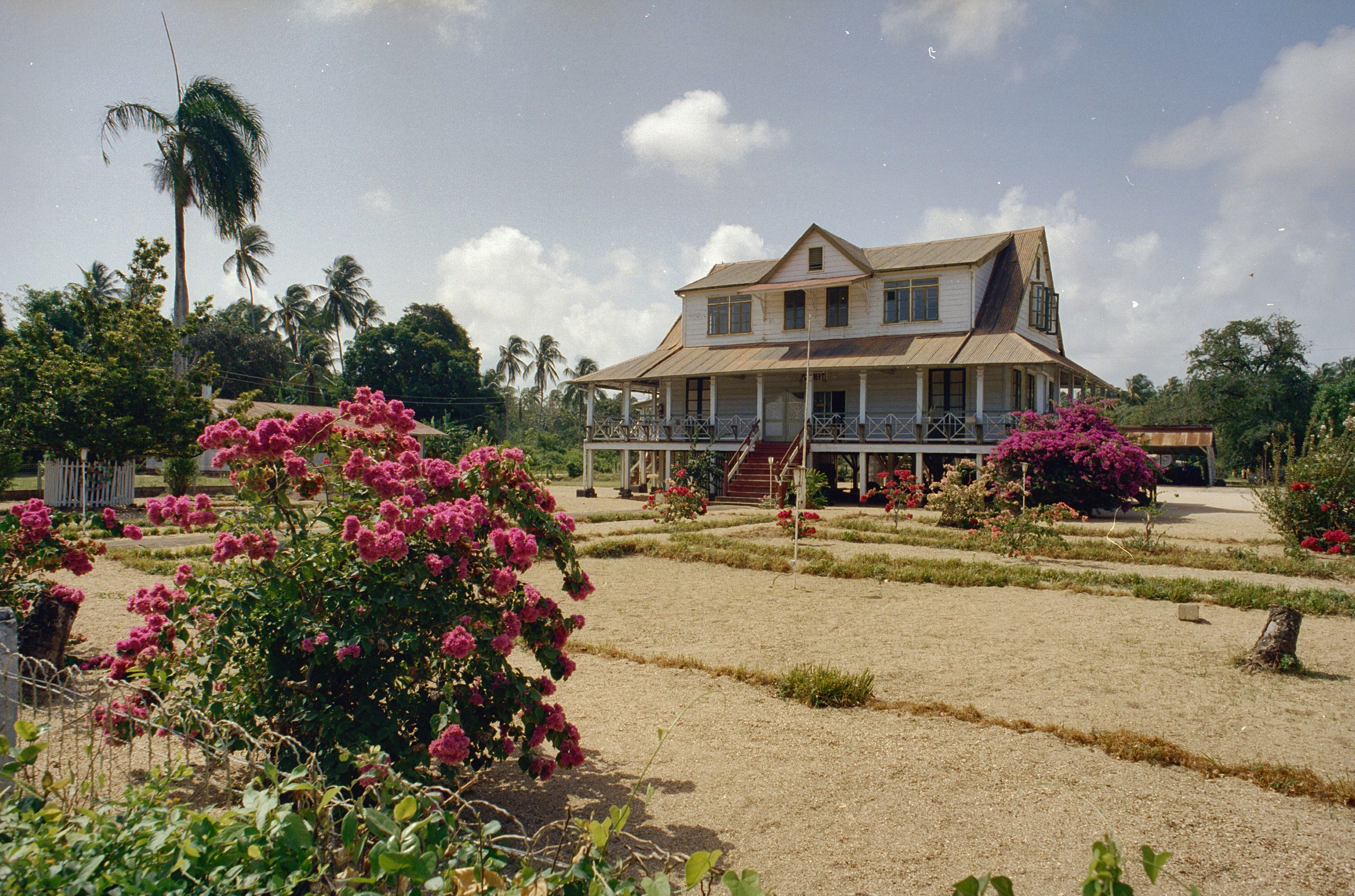
- A house in Friendship

- Location in Suriname
- Coordinates: 5°53′0″N 56°20′23″W
- Country: Suriname
- District: Coronie District
- Resort: Totness

Friendship is a town in the Totness resort in the Coronie district in Suriname. Friendship is a former cotton plantation founded in 1824. The village of Friendship is to the north of the East-West Link, and Totness is to the south of the road. A clinic is located in the town, and serves both Totness and Friendship. The school in Totness is shared with Friendship.
