= Kalebaskreek =

- Village
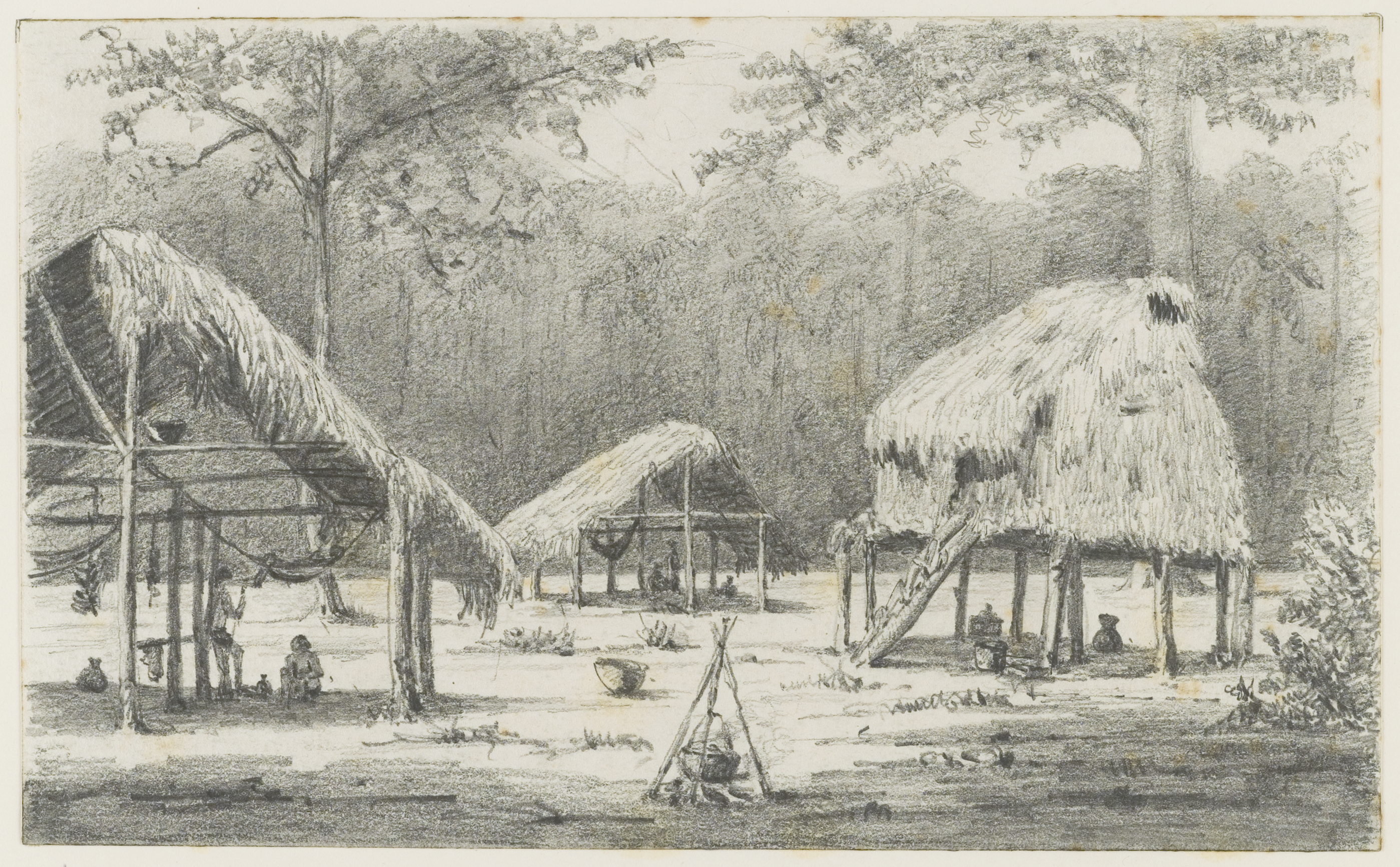
- Drawing of Kalebaskreek (circa 1880) by the Dutch Roman Catholic priest Arnoldus Borret (1848-1888)

- Location within Suriname
- Coordinates: 5.675278°N 55.888889°W
- Country: Suriname
- District: Saramacca District
- Resort: Calcutta

Government
  - Captain: Conchita Alkantara (2018)

Population (2020)
  - Total: 170
- Time zone: UTC-3 (AST)

Kalebaskreek is an Indigenous village of Kalina Amerindians in the resort of Calcutta in the Saramacca District in Suriname.

== History ==
Kalebaskreek is a fishing village on the Coppename River. The village can only be reached by boat. It is located about one hour upstream of Boskamp. The nearest village is the former leper colony of Batavia which is located 15 minutes downstream.

The school of Kalebaskreek used to be located in a building of the Moravian Church. In 2014, a new school was constructed. The clinic in the village is operated by the Mungra Medical Centre in Nieuw-Nickerie. In 2019, a waste incineration plant was opened in the village. The village chief as of 2018 is Conchita Alkantara.
