= Wayambo =

Wayambo may refer to:

- Wayamboweg, a resort (municipality) in Suriname
- Wayambo River, a river in Suriname
