= Coronie District =

District of Suriname

Coronie Kosu (Sranan Tongo) Karoni (Caribbean Hindustani) Keròni (Caribbean Javanese)
- District
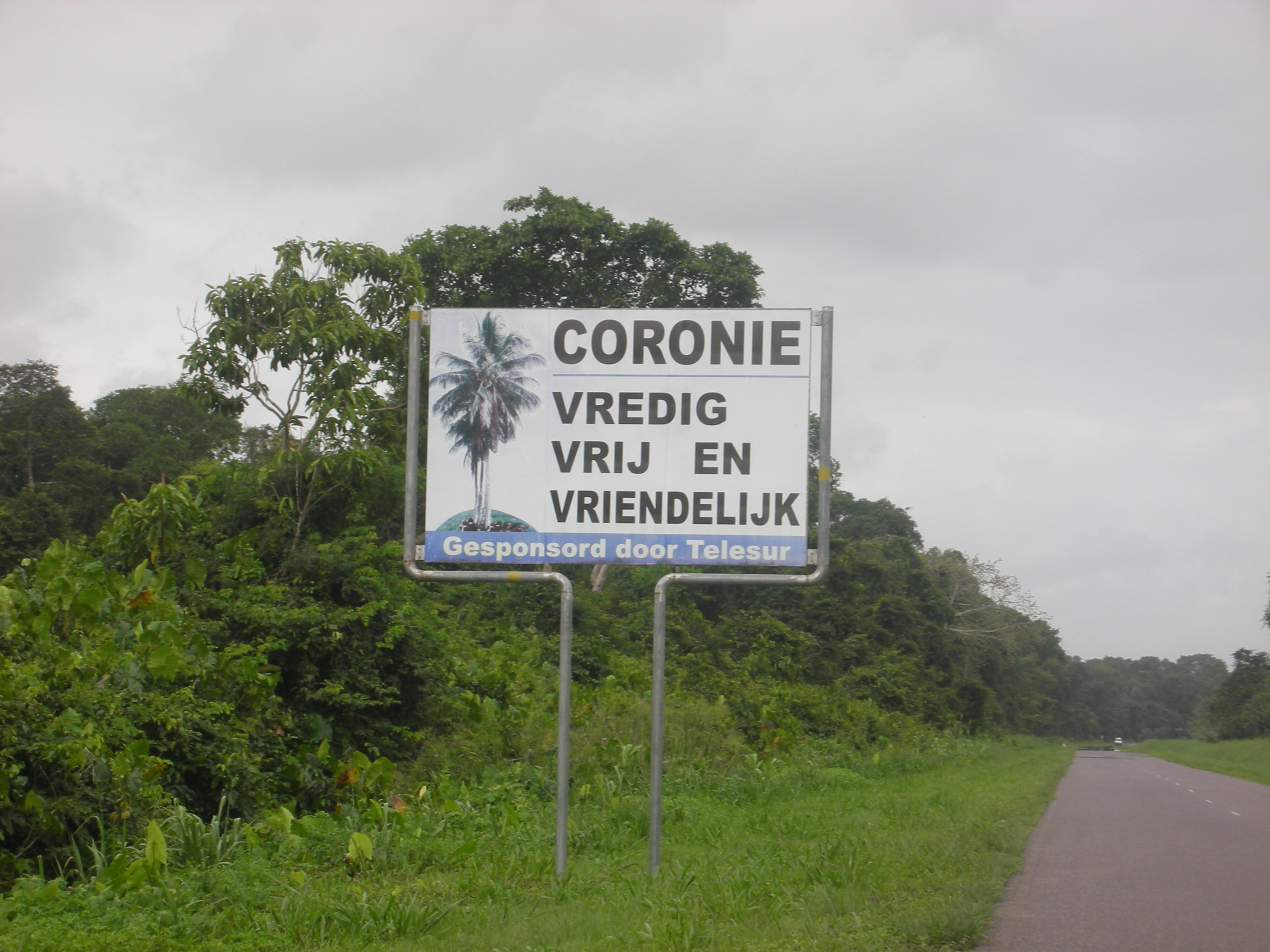
- Translation of the sign: Coronie: peaceful, free and friendly

- Map of Suriname showing Coronie district
- Coordinates: 5°46′N 56°17′W
- Country: Suriname
- Established: 1851
- Capital: Totness

Area
  - Total: 3,902 km^{2} (1,507 sq mi)

Population (2012 census)
  - Total: 3,391
  - Density: 0.8690/km^{2} (2.251/sq mi)
- Time zone: UTC-3

Coronie (Note: Sranan Tongo: Kosu, Caribbean Hindustani: Karoni, Caribbean Javanese: Keròni) is a district of Suriname, situated on the coast. Coronie's capital city is Totness. The district border the Atlantic Ocean to the north, the Surinamese district of Saramacca to the east, the Surinamese district of Sipaliwini to the south and the Surinamese district of Nickerie to the west. The district is served by the Totness Airstrip.

The district has a population of 3,391 and an area of 3,902 km^{2}, making it the least-populated district of Suriname.

== History ==
The first plantations were established from 1808 onwards by English and Scottish colonists. Coronie became an independent district in 1851. The oldest plantation in the district is Burnside. Coronie was isolated and it was not until the 1940s, that a road was built linking Totness with Paramaribo, which is nowadays part of the East-West Link.

In September 1965, four sounding rockets of Apache type with a maximum altitude of 205 km were launched. The rockets were launched as part as an investigation into the workings of the jet stream. The project was carried out by University of Utrecht and Royal Netherlands Meteorological Institute. NASA provided the rockets.

Totness has been designated as a regional centre in the beginning of the 21st century, and is planned to be upgrade with a medium-sized hotel and a proper city centre. The area from Clyde to Burnside has no electricity, or telephone.

== Economy ==
Coronie, as with most of Suriname, relies mostly upon agriculture for both its income and its food supply. The coastal environment made it a suitable are for coconut and rice plantations. In the late 20th century, rice became a major agricultural crop. The rice fields are suited in the south and along the East-West Link.

The flat and muddy coast with shallow waters prevented the construction of major harbors and large ships had to anchor miles off shores and transfer their passengers and cargo to little boats.

== Resorts ==
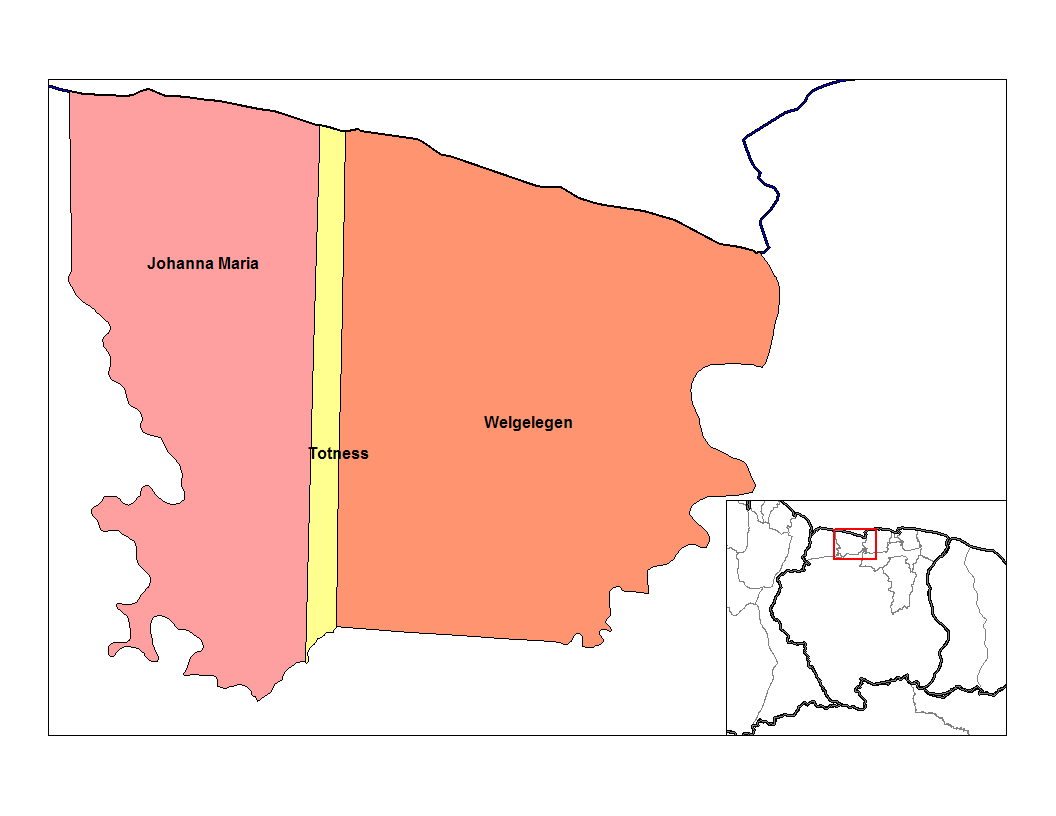
Resorts of Coronie

Coronie is divided into 3 resorts (ressorten):

- Johanna Maria
- Totness
- Welgelegen

== Villages ==
Other villages in Coronie are:

- Friendship
- Jenny
- Mary's Hope

== Nature reserves ==
Coronie is home to three protected areas. The Peruvia Nature Reserve which was established in 1986 and covers 31,000 hectares, the Bigi Pan nature reserve which was established in 1987 and covers 67,000 hectares, and the Noord Coronie protected area which was established in 1987 and covers 27,200 hectares.
