= Mary's Hope =

- Village
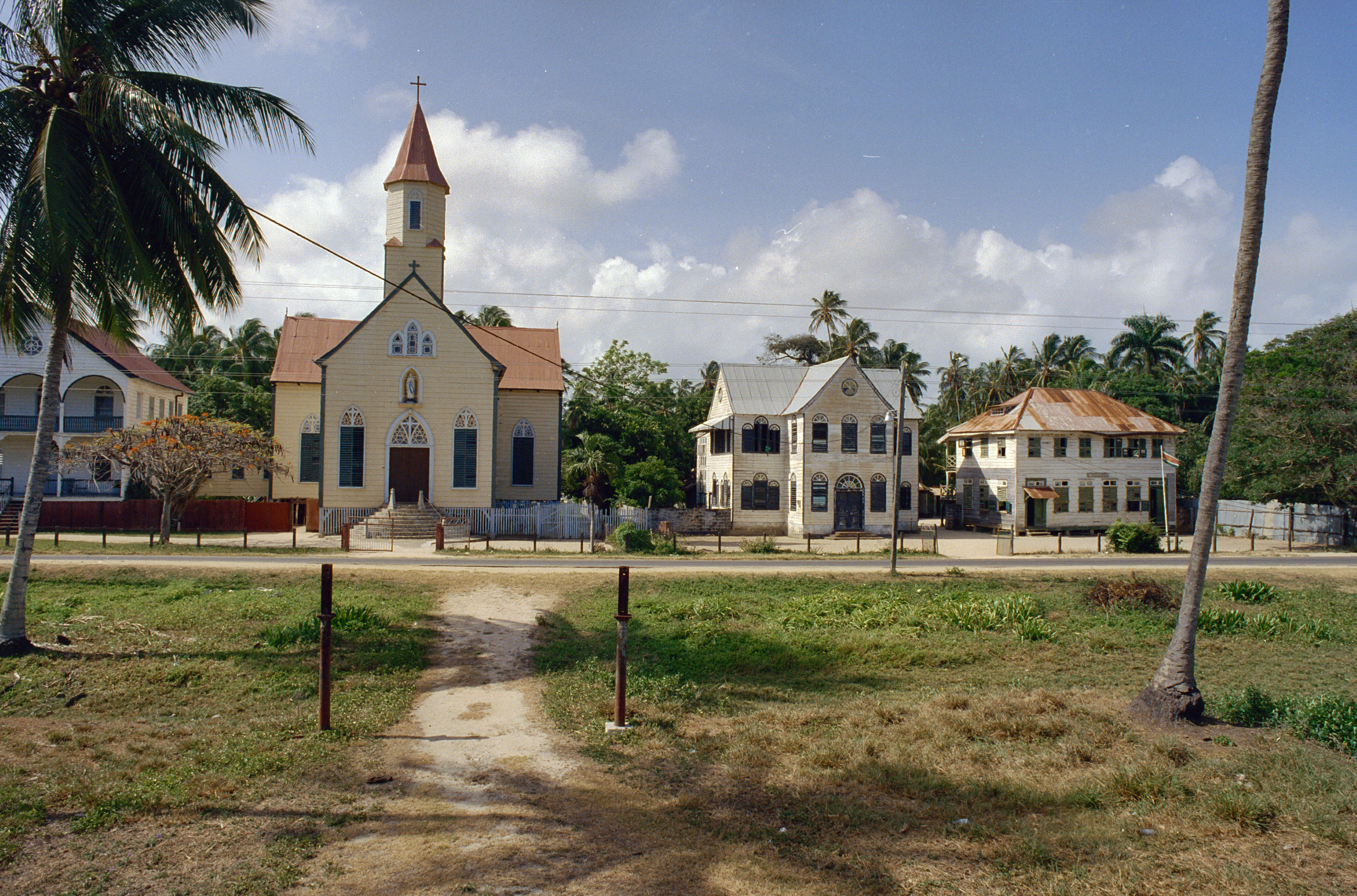

- Location in Suriname
- Coordinates: 05°52′37″N 56°19′00″W
- Country: Suriname
- District: Coronie District
- Resort: Welgelegen
- Time zone: UTC-03:00 (SRT)

Mary's Hope is a village in the Welgelegen resort of the Coronie District of Suriname. The village can be accessed from the East-West Link.

== Overview ==
Mary's Hope started in 1817 as a slave plantation, producing cotton, owned by Edward Conolly who was originally from Ireland. 138 people were enslaved on the plantation at the time of the emancipation of slavery in 1863. Later, the plantation changed ownership several times, and was in a neglected state. In 1872, Mary's Hope was the fourth largest settlement in the district of Coronie.

On 15 December 1874, land was donated to a Roman Catholic mission to build a school, a church and a rectory. In 1875, a little church was built. In 1884, Peter Donders was the parson, and Mary's Hope had developed into the most important parish in Coronie. In 1892, the Church of Immaculate Conception was constructed. The church was built by Frans Harmes who also constructed the cathedral in Paramaribo.

In 1922, Father J. de Kort embarked on a plan to create a rice polder. In 1935, the Sint Jozef vereniging was founded, a cooperation of rice growers, and Mary's Hope has developed as a rice growing community.

The village is connected to the electricity grid, but has no telephone connection.
