= Calcutta, Suriname =

Coordinates: 5°50′45″N 55°40′32″W

- Resort
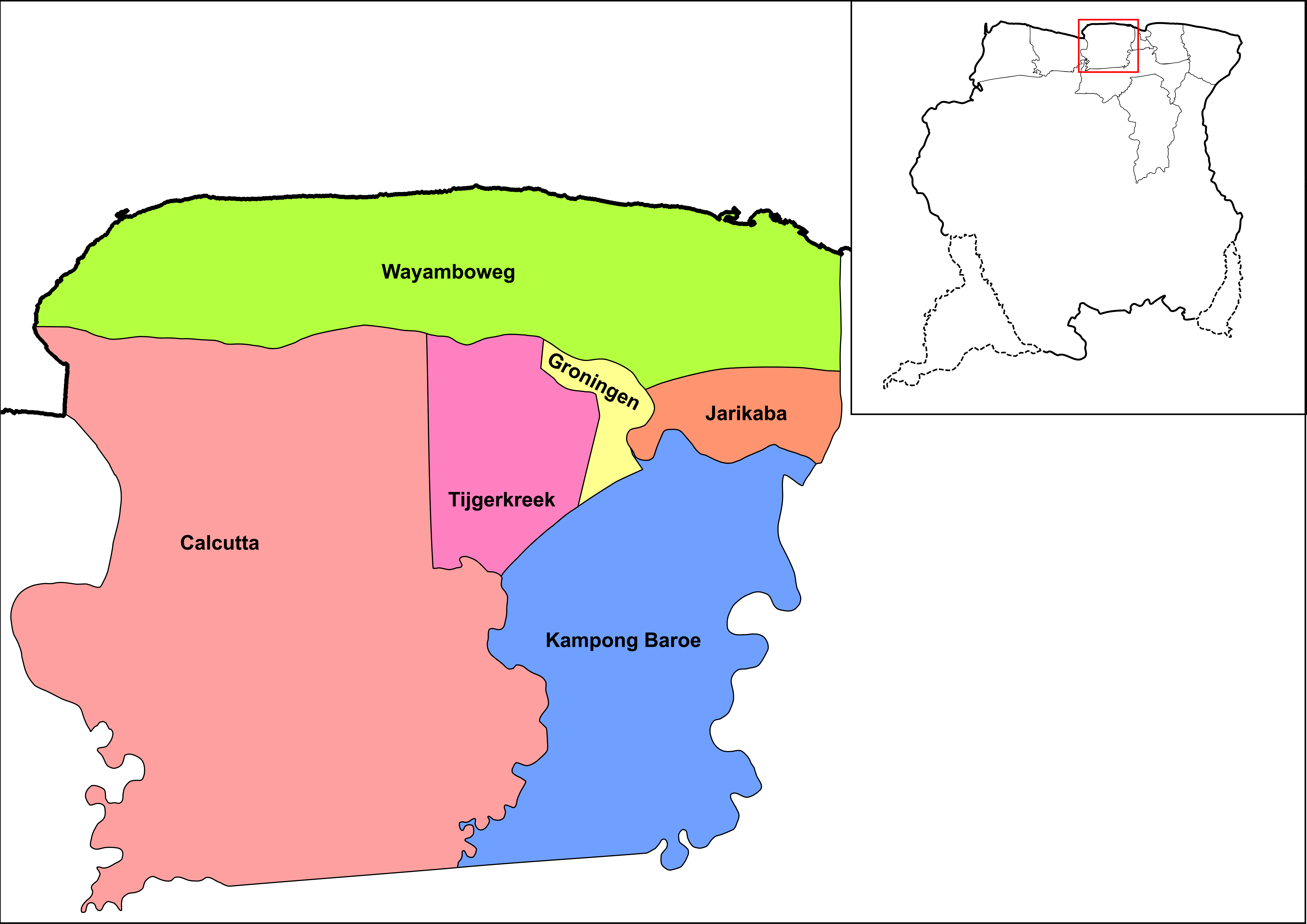
- Map showing the resorts of Saramacca District. Calcutta
- Country: Suriname
- District: Saramacca District

Area
  - Total: 1,655 km^{2} (639 sq mi)
- Elevation: 4 m (13 ft)

Population (2012)
  - Total: 1,647
  - Density: 0.9952/km^{2} (2.577/sq mi)
- Time zone: UTC-3 (AST)

Calcutta is a resort in Suriname, located in the Saramacca District. Its population at the 2012 census was 1,647, and is mainly inhabited by East Indians. The town is named after Calcutta, India. From 1873 onwards, indentured workers were recruited from India to work the plantations. Most of the workers departed from Calcutta. About one third returned to India, but most decided to stay in Suriname.

Calcutta is the place where oil was discovered in 1965 which marked the beginning of Staatsolie, the national oil and gold company. Calcutta is a major centre of rice cultivation.

The resorts also contains the village of Boskamp and the indigenous village of Kalebaskreek. The former leprosy colony of Batavia is located in the resort.
