= Tijgerkreek =

Coordinates: 5.73425°N 55.5579°W

- Resort
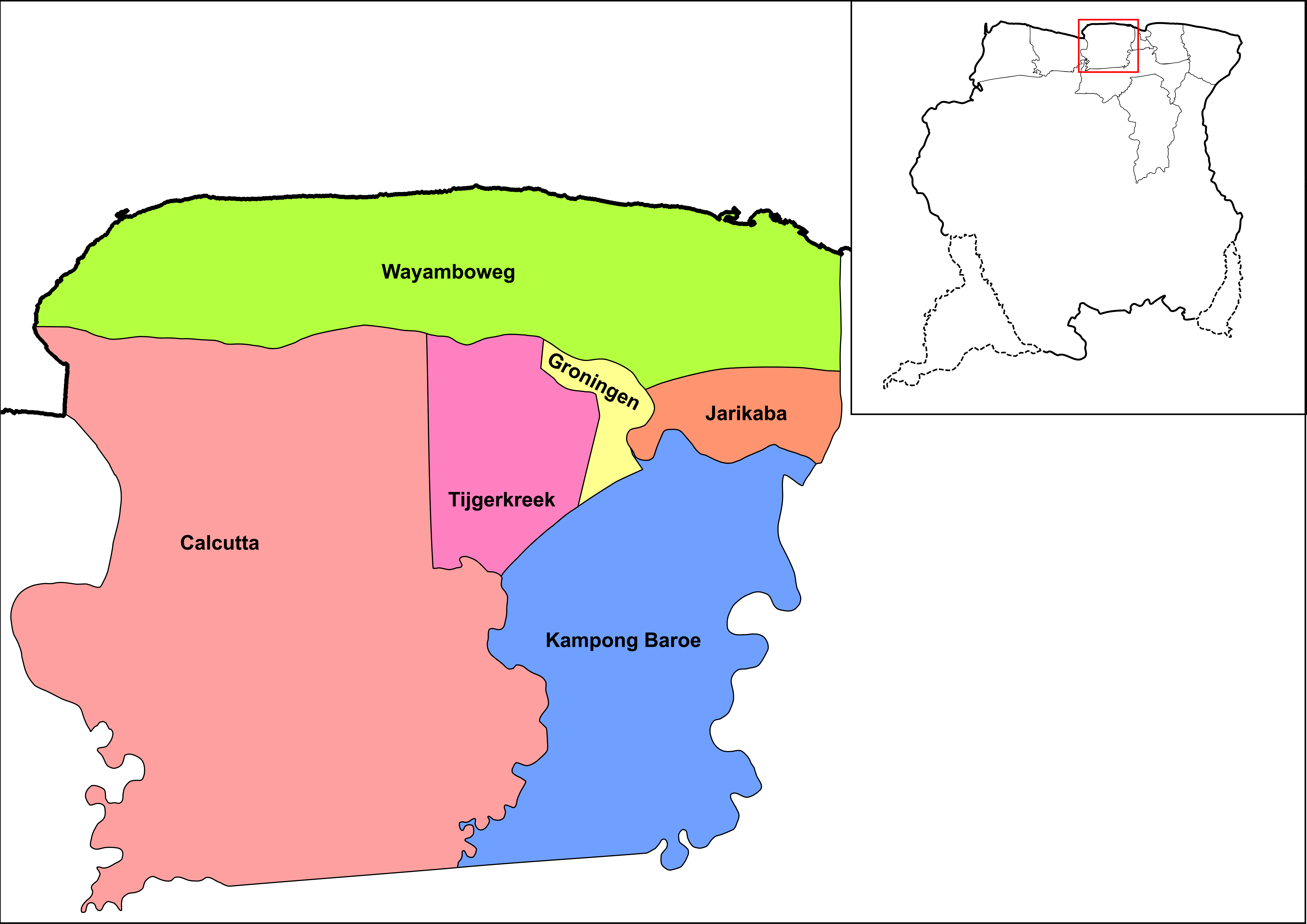
- Map showing the resorts of Saramacca District. Tijgerkreek
- Country: Suriname
- District: Saramacca District

Area
  - Total: 241 km^{2} (93 sq mi)

Population (2012)
  - Total: 3,244
  - Density: 13.5/km^{2} (34.9/sq mi)
- Time zone: UTC-3 (AST)

Tijgerkreek is a resort in Suriname, located in the Saramacca District. Its population at the 2012 census was 3,244, the majority being Javanese, and East Indian. The resort is mainly agricultural. In the 21st century, there has been an emphasis on peanuts. The development of a modern agricultural centre is being planned.

The resort is named after the creek Tijgerkreek which is a tributary of the Saramacca River, however the main settlement is Sidoredjo which was incorporated as a village in 1937.
