= Jenny, Suriname =

Jenny
- Location in Suriname
- Coordinates: 5°46′7″N 55°54′16″W
- Country: Suriname
- District: Coronie District
- Resort: Welgelegen

Jenny is a town on the East-West Link in Suriname, located in the Welgelegen resort of Coronie district. It lies on the mouth of the Coppename River opposite the town of Boskamp, to which it is linked by the Coppename bridge.

In the 1940s the Coronie District was released from its isolation when the Saramaccaweg was extended to Boskamp. In 1999, the ferry was replaced with the Coppename bridge.
