= Smithfield, Suriname =

Smithfield
- Location within Suriname
- Coordinates: 5°50′47″N 55°32′24″W
- Country: Suriname
- District: Saramacca District
- Resorts: Wayamboweg
- Elevation: 5 m (16 ft)
- Time zone: UTC-3 (ART)

Smithfield (pop. 507) is a settlement in the Saramacca District of Suriname, about ten kilometres (6.2 mi) north of the district capital, Groningen. It is named after plantation Smithfield. Staatsolie operates a yard in Sarah Maria near Smithfield.
