= Boston, Suriname =

Boston
- Location within Suriname
- Coordinates: 5°42′51″N 55°21′35″W
- Country: Suriname
- District: Saramacca District
- Resort: Kampong Baroe
- Elevation: 12 m (39 ft)
- Time zone: UTC-3 (ART)

Boston is a settlement in Kampong Baroe in the Saramacca District of Suriname, near the resort capital of Kampong Baroe. Boston was founded as a wood plantation in 1819, and abandoned in 1828. In 1840, it was listed as inhabited, and used for crop cultivation.
