= Meerzorg =

- Resort
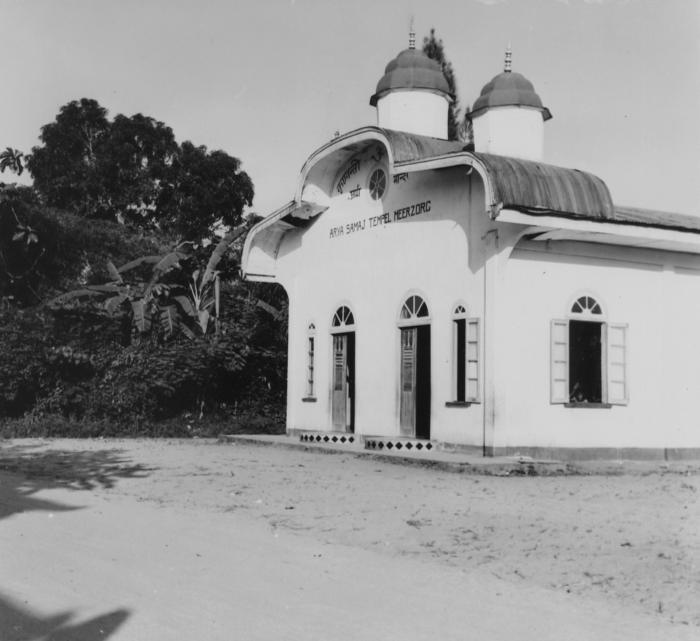
- The Arya Samaj Temple in Meerzorg (1964)

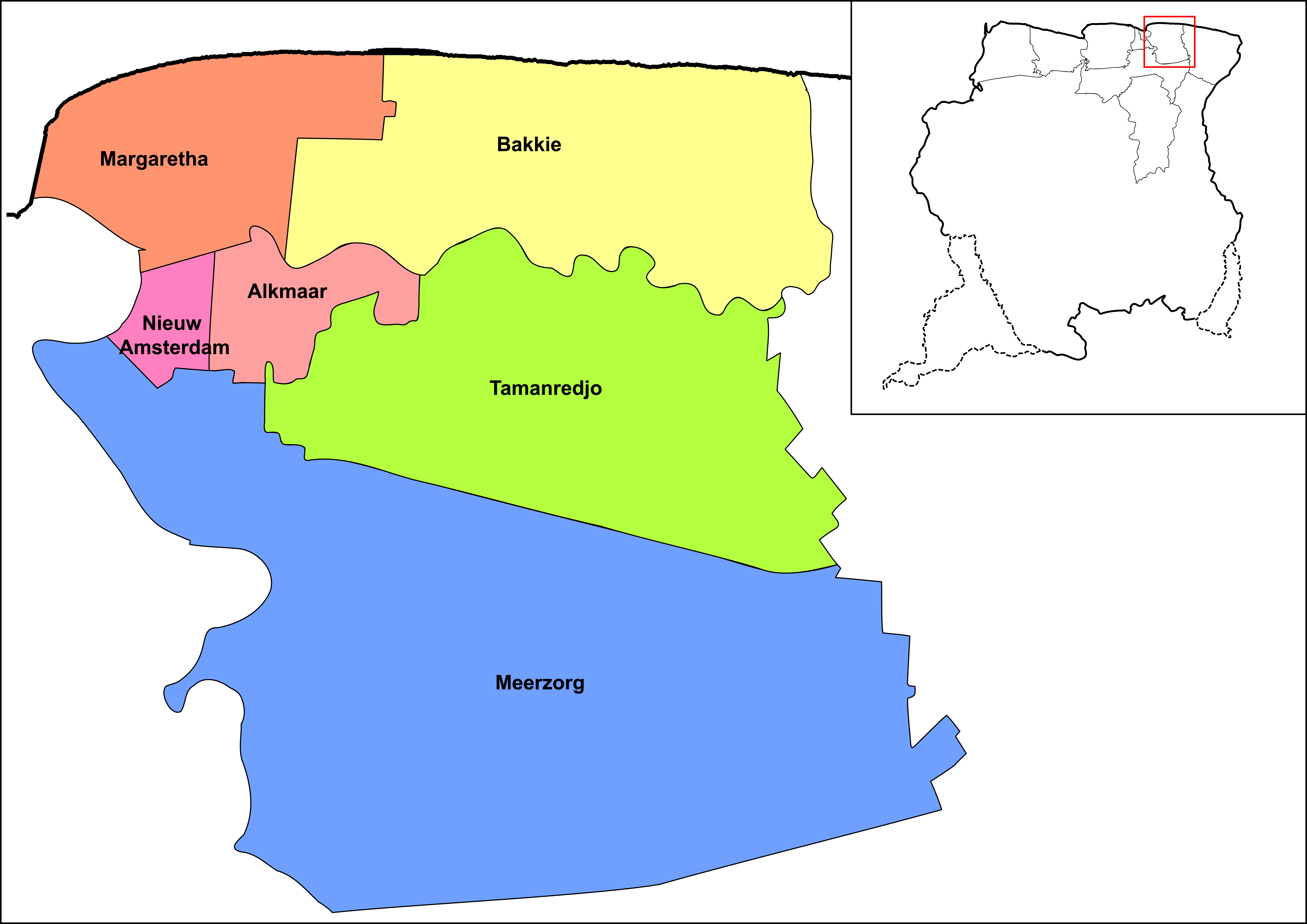
- Map showing the resorts of Commewijne District. Meerzorg
- Coordinates: 5°48′26″N 55°8′49″W
- Country: Suriname
- District: Commewijne District

Area
  - Total: 1,081 km^{2} (417 sq mi)
- Elevation: 1 m (3.3 ft)

Population (2012)
  - Total: 12,405
  - Density: 11.48/km^{2} (29.72/sq mi)
- Time zone: UTC-3 (AST)

Meerzorg (Sranan Tongo: Ansu) is a town and resort (municipality) in Suriname, located on the eastern bank of the Suriname River, directly opposite the capital Paramaribo. Its population at the 2012 census was 12,405. Since 2000 it has been connected to Paramaribo by the Jules Wijdenbosch Bridge, named after the former President Jules Wijdenbosch.

== History ==
Meerzorg is named after the sugar plantation Meerzorg. The plantation was founded at the end of the 17th century, and was originally called Plantage Amsinck. On 10 October 1712, Jacques Cassard captured the plantation for France, and threatened Paramaribo across the Suriname river. Negotiations started, and on 27 October Cassard left with ƒ747,350 (€8.1 million in 2018) worth of goods and slaves. To protect Paramaribo and Commewijne from future attacks, Fort Nieuw-Amsterdam was constructed, and opened in 1747.

On 15 March 1907, the plantation owners announced a grand plan: a tram line would be laid between Spieringshoek and Meerzorg, the United Fruit Company would start loading bananas at a new wharf, and a steamboat ferry would connect Meerzorg with Paramaribo. On 26 August 1907, the plans were cancelled, and the owner was thinking of selling the plantation. In 1915, the plantation was bought by the government to be repurposed for small scale agriculture, and suburban housing projects. Due to the proximity of Paramaribo, factories were built in Meerzorg. In 1930, the plantation was extended by a polder, and the new land was used to grow rice. Meerzorg started to grow, and by 1948 had a population of 4,000 people. In 1958, the Commewijne District was expanded to include Meerzorg boosting its population.

In 1931, a ferry opened between Meerzorg en Waterkant, Paramaribo, but to improve access to the eastern part of Suriname, the Jules Wijdenbosch Bridge was opened on 20 May 2000, replacing the ferry. The bridge is part of the East-West Link. There have been repeated calls to reopen a ferry service for bikes and pedestrians. The ferry wharf has been upgraded to a touristic zone as of 2012.

Meerzorg has been designated as a regional centre, and suburban area for Paramaribo, and there have been many building projects in the early 21st century. In 2006, the plan Richelieu was announced to build 4,000 houses at the location of the former plantation in corporation with the Development Bureau of the Dutch city of Amsterdam.

Meerzorg was also home to the Cinema Ansoe, a unique wooden art-deco cinema, which opened on 28 November 1958. As of 2013, the cinema was in a dilapidated condition with broken windows.

== Other settlements ==
The village of Laarwijk is located on the Meerzorg resort.

The Brooskampers Maroons lived on plantations Rorac and Klaverblad between 1863 and 1917.

== Peperpot nature park ==
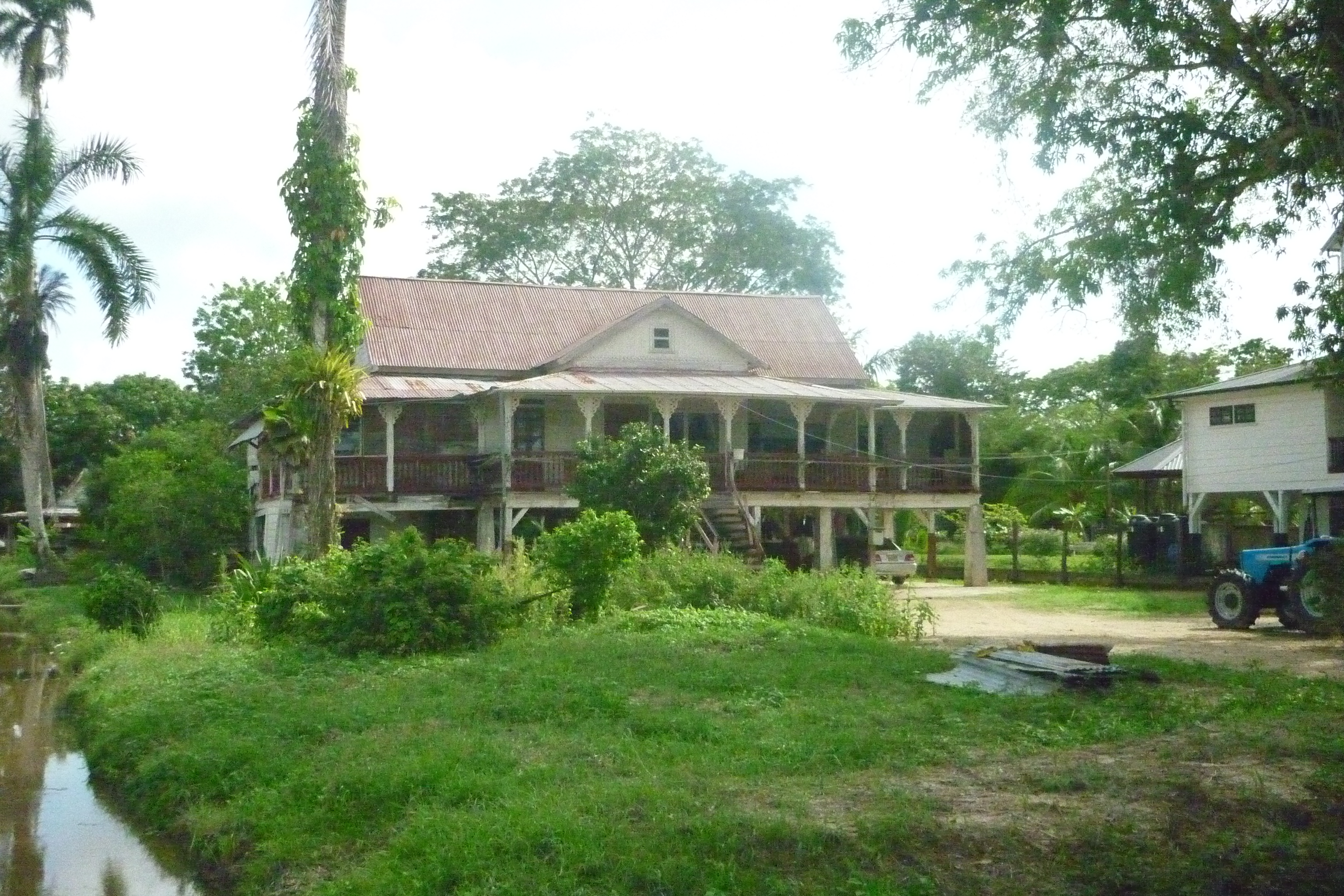
Peperpot Plantation house

Peperpot is a former coffee plantation located to the south of the town of Meerzorg. It is one of the oldest plantations. The exact year of founding is not known, but it was soon after 1692. The plantation remained in production until 1998. The plantation has been transformed into a 700 hectares nature park, and is home to many birds and animals. The nature park opened in 2009 and was financed by the World Wide Fund for Nature and the Nationale Postcode Loterij.

== Sports ==
The Meerzorg Stadion, a multi-purpose stadium, is located in Meerzorg near the East-West Link. The stadium is home to both SVB Hoofdklasse clubs SV Excelsior and SV Nishan 42. The stadium has a capacity of 1,300 people.
