= Jules Wijdenbosch Bridge =

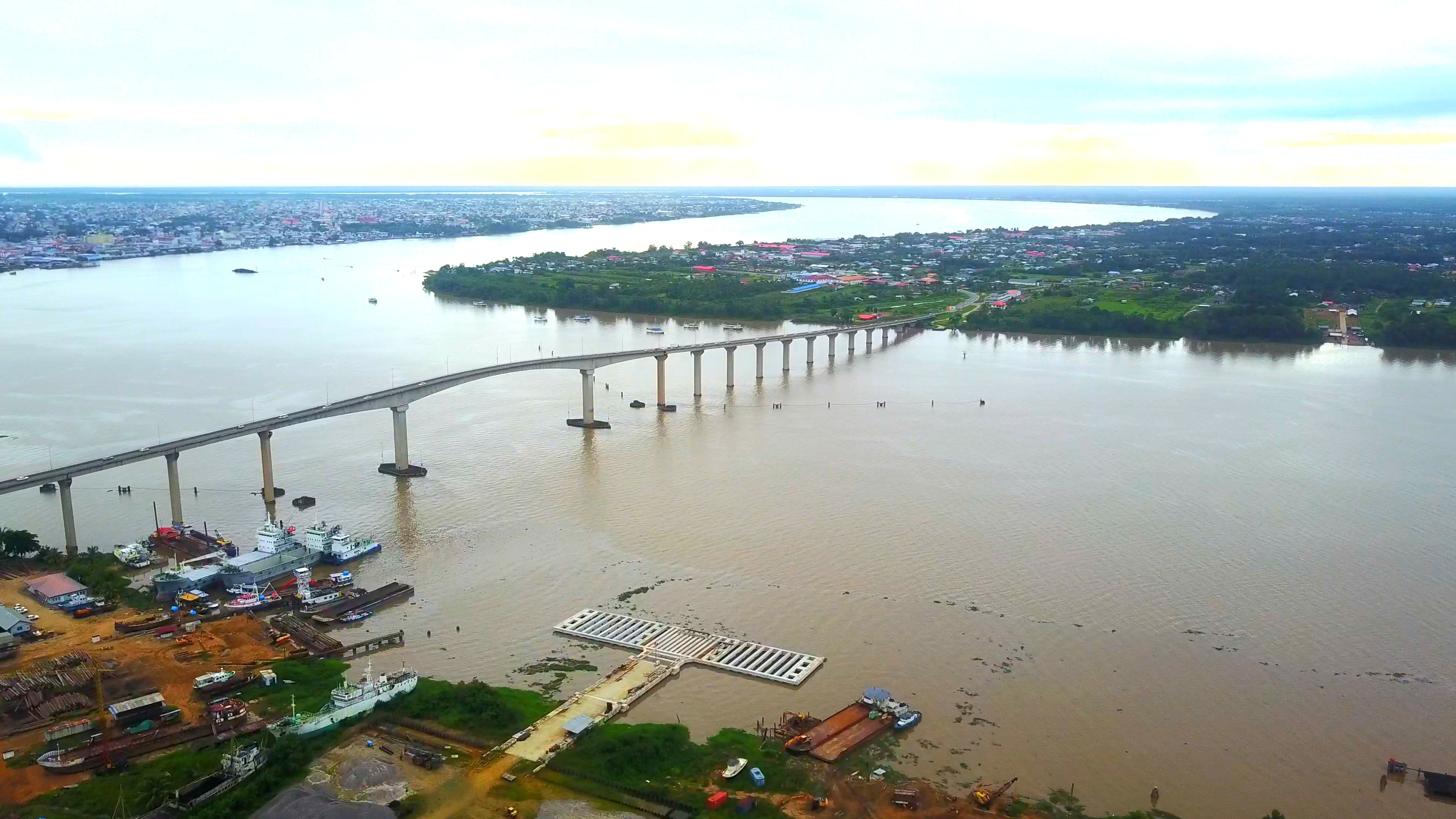
- The Jules Wijdenbosch Bridge on the mouth of the Suriname river in Paramaribo
- Coordinates: 5°48′20″N 55°09′45″W
- Carries: 2-lane wide highway (East-West Link)
- Crosses: Suriname river
- Locale: North Suriname
- Other name: Suriname Bridge

Characteristics
- Material: Concrete
- Total length: 1,504 metres (4,934 ft)
- Longest span: 155 metres (509 ft)
- No. of lanes: 2

History
- Opened: 20 May 2000

Location
- Interactive map of Jules Wijdenbosch Bridge

The Jules Wijdenbosch Bridge (Dutch: Jules Wijdenboschbrug), also called Suriname bridge and known locally as Bosje Brug, is a concrete road bridge over the Suriname River between the capital city Paramaribo and Meerzorg in the Commewijne District. The bridge is part of the East-West Link, and is named after former president Jules Wijdenbosch, who opened it. Constructed by Dutch constructor Ballast-Nedam, the bridge has two lanes, is 1504 metres long, and was opened on 20 May 2000.

== Gallery ==
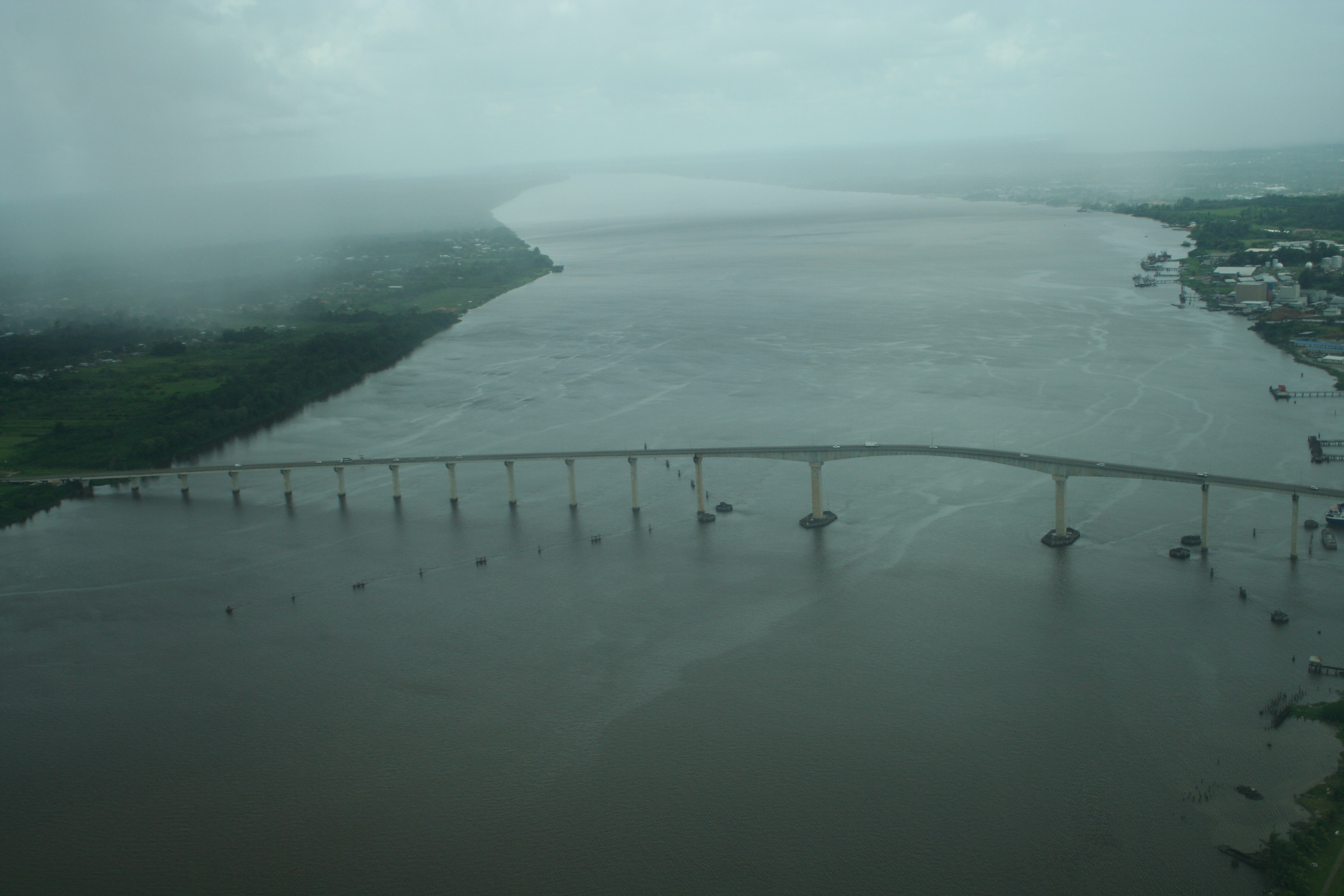
The bridge from the air.

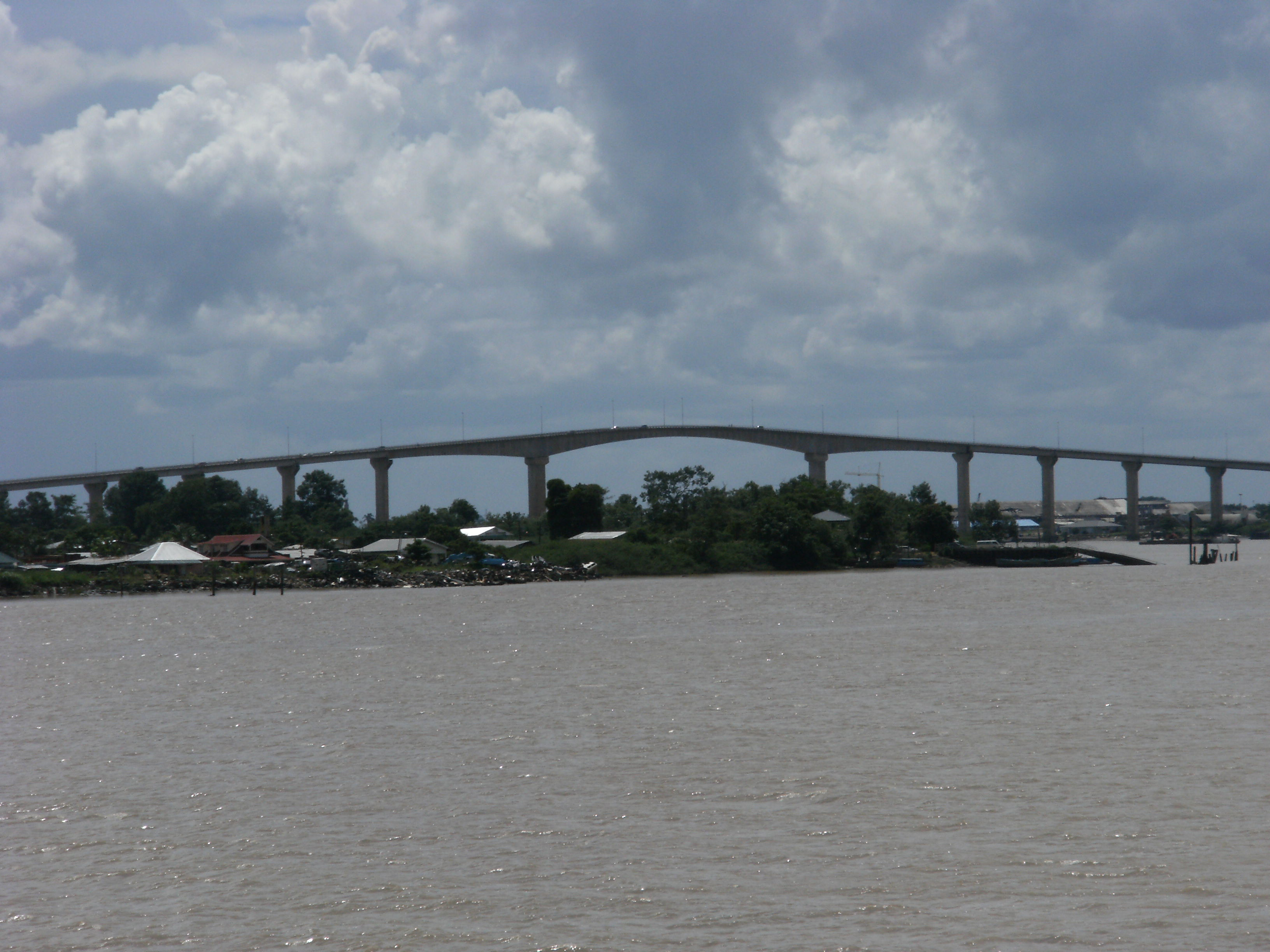

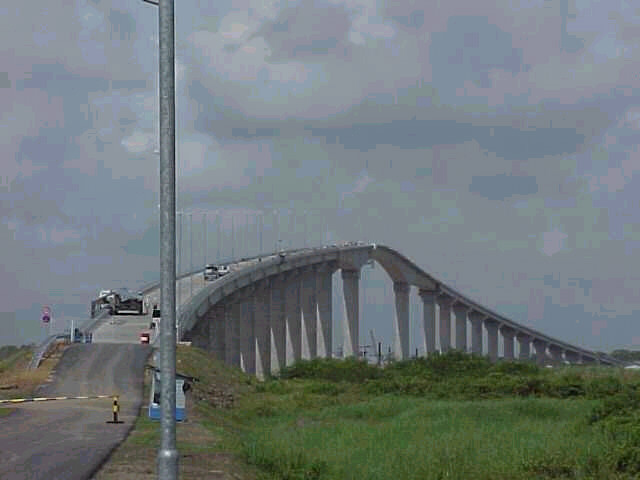
The bridge from the road.

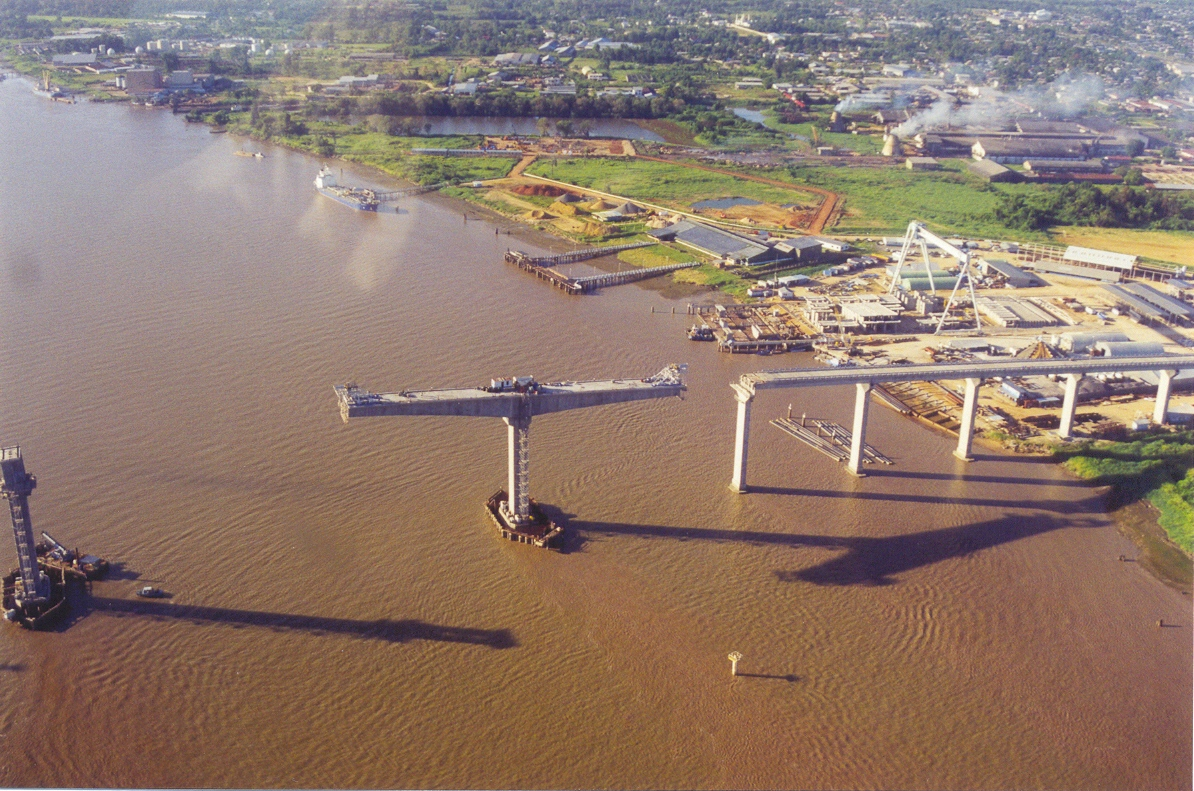
Under construction (1999).

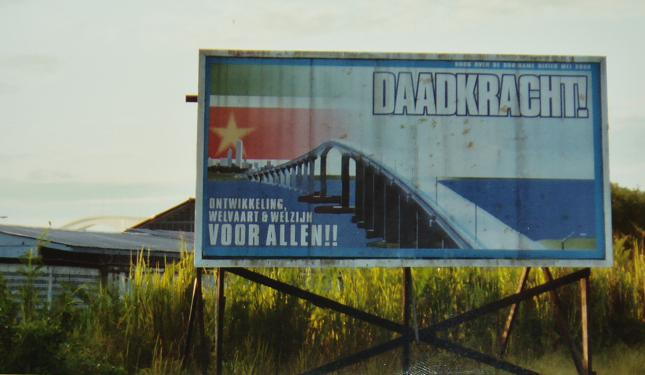
Propaganda advertisement.

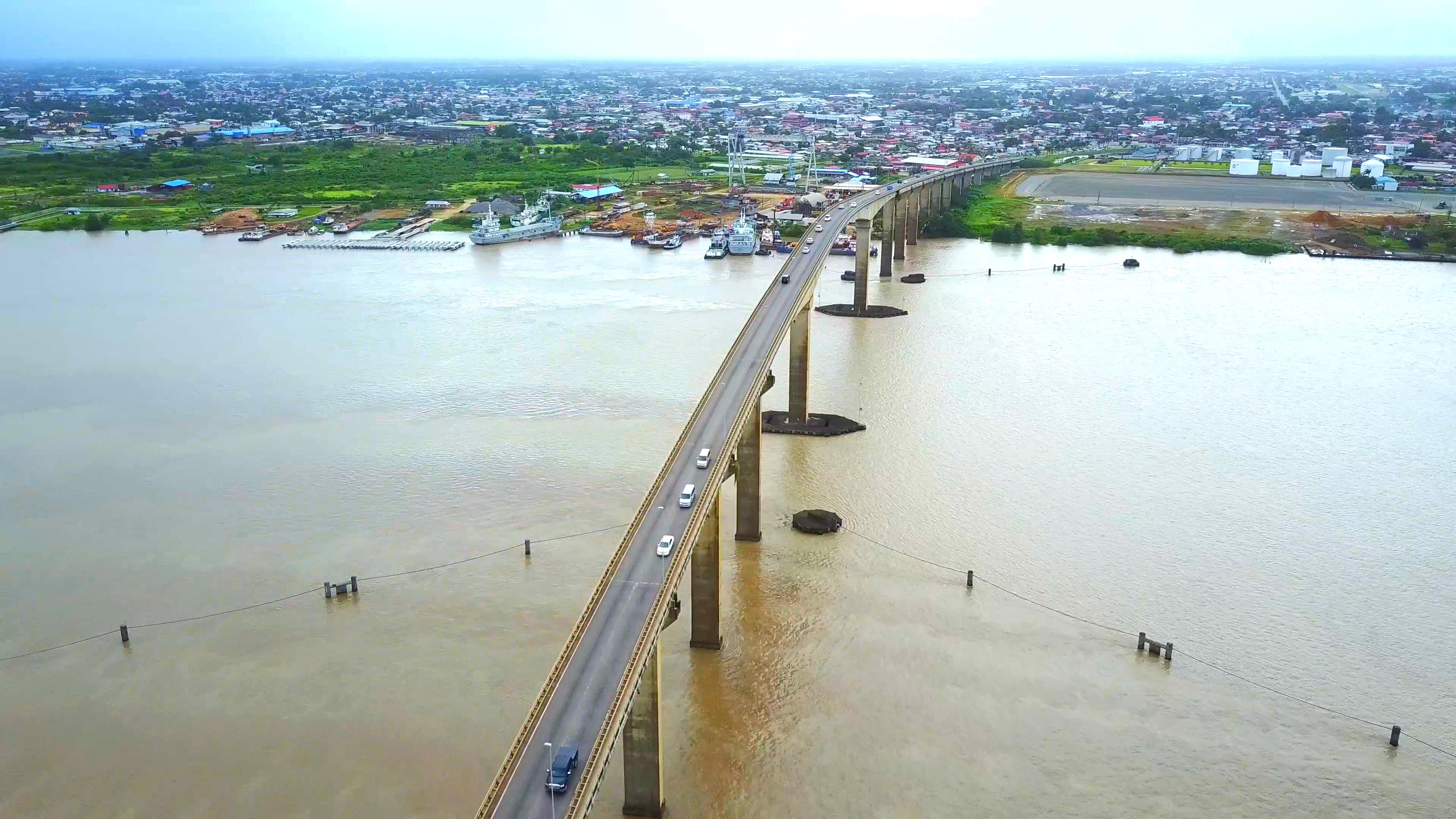

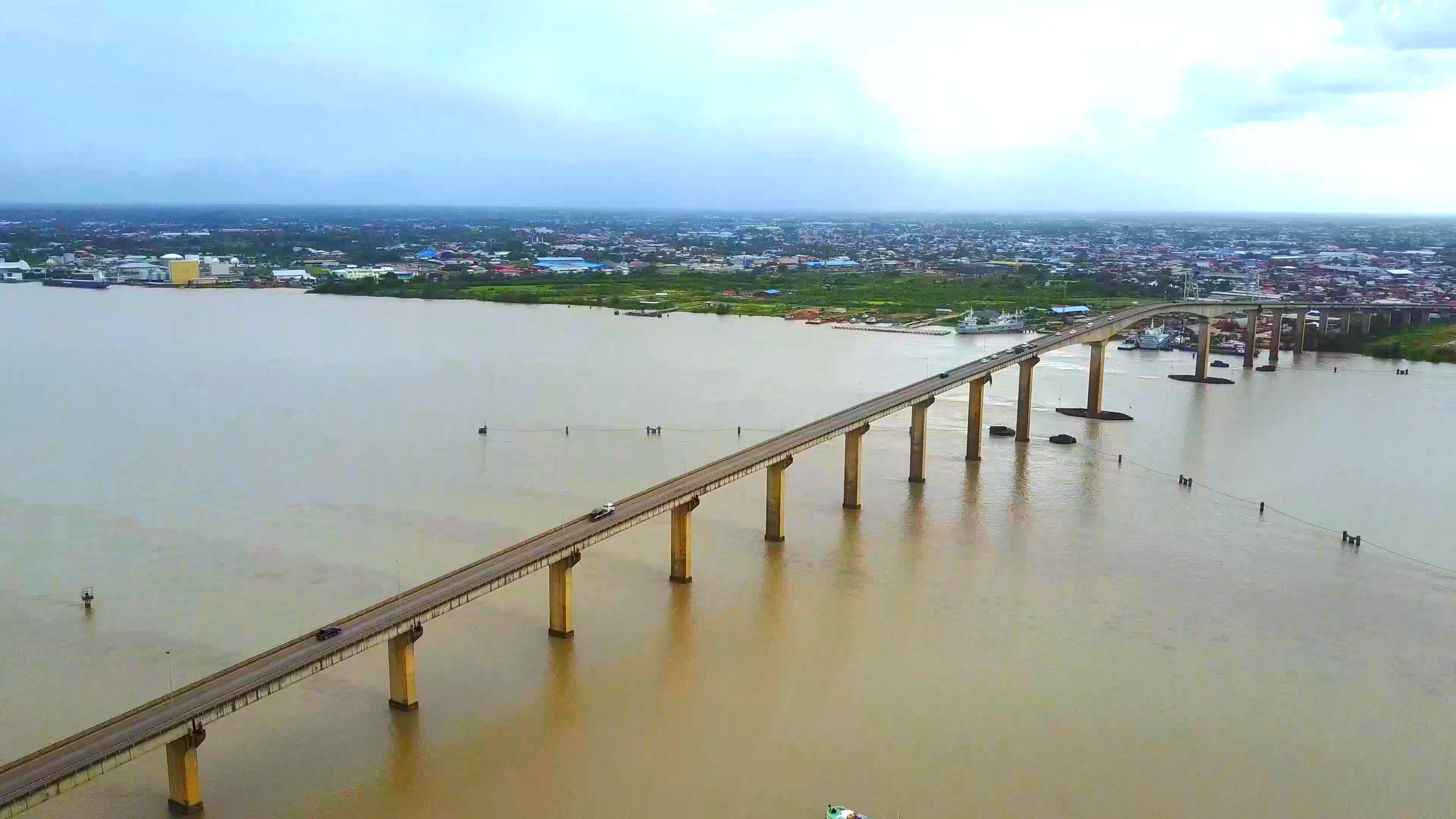

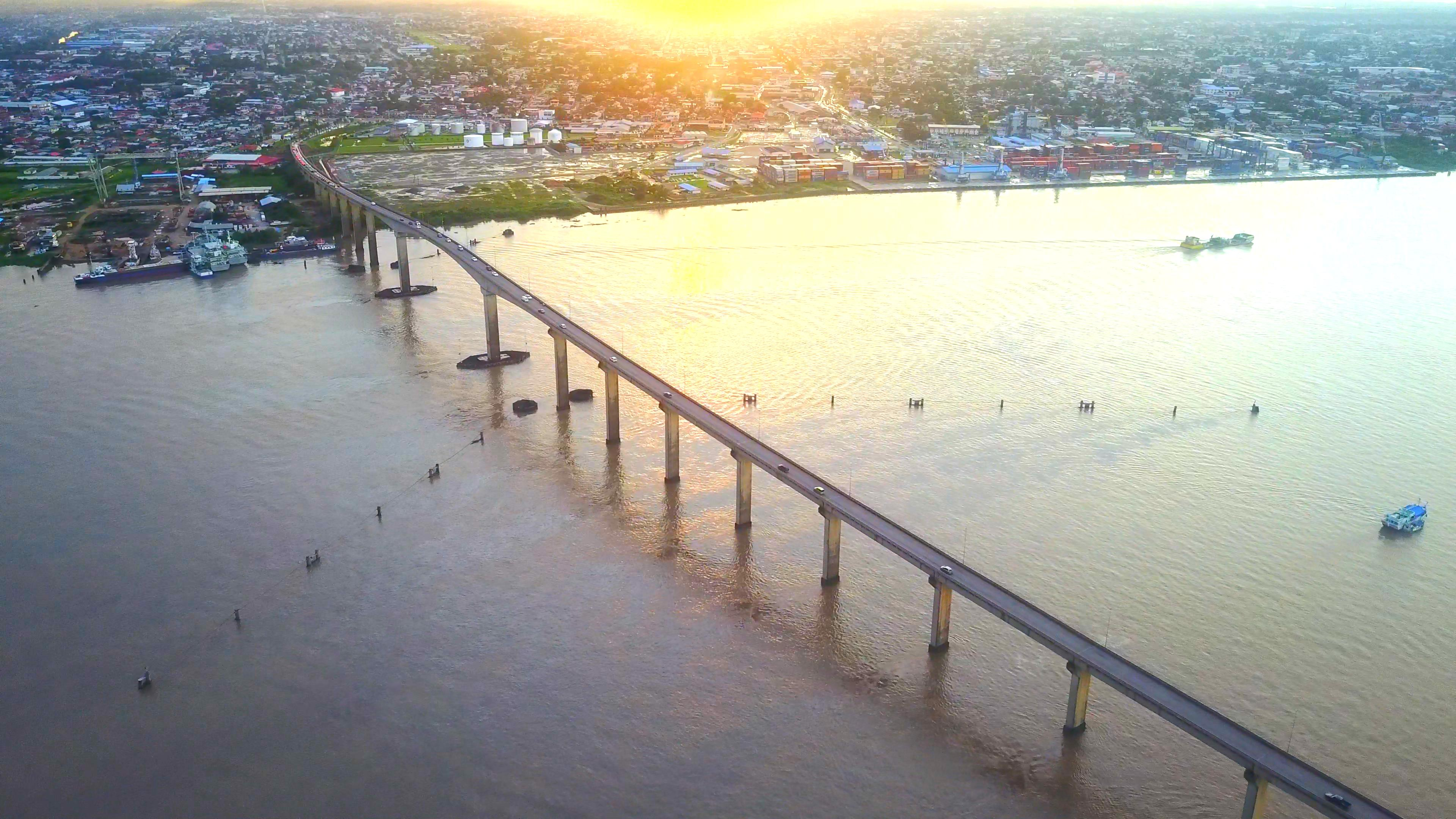

== See also ==
- Coppename Bridge
