= Kampong Baroe =

Coordinates: 5°45′3″N 55°24′33″W

- Resort
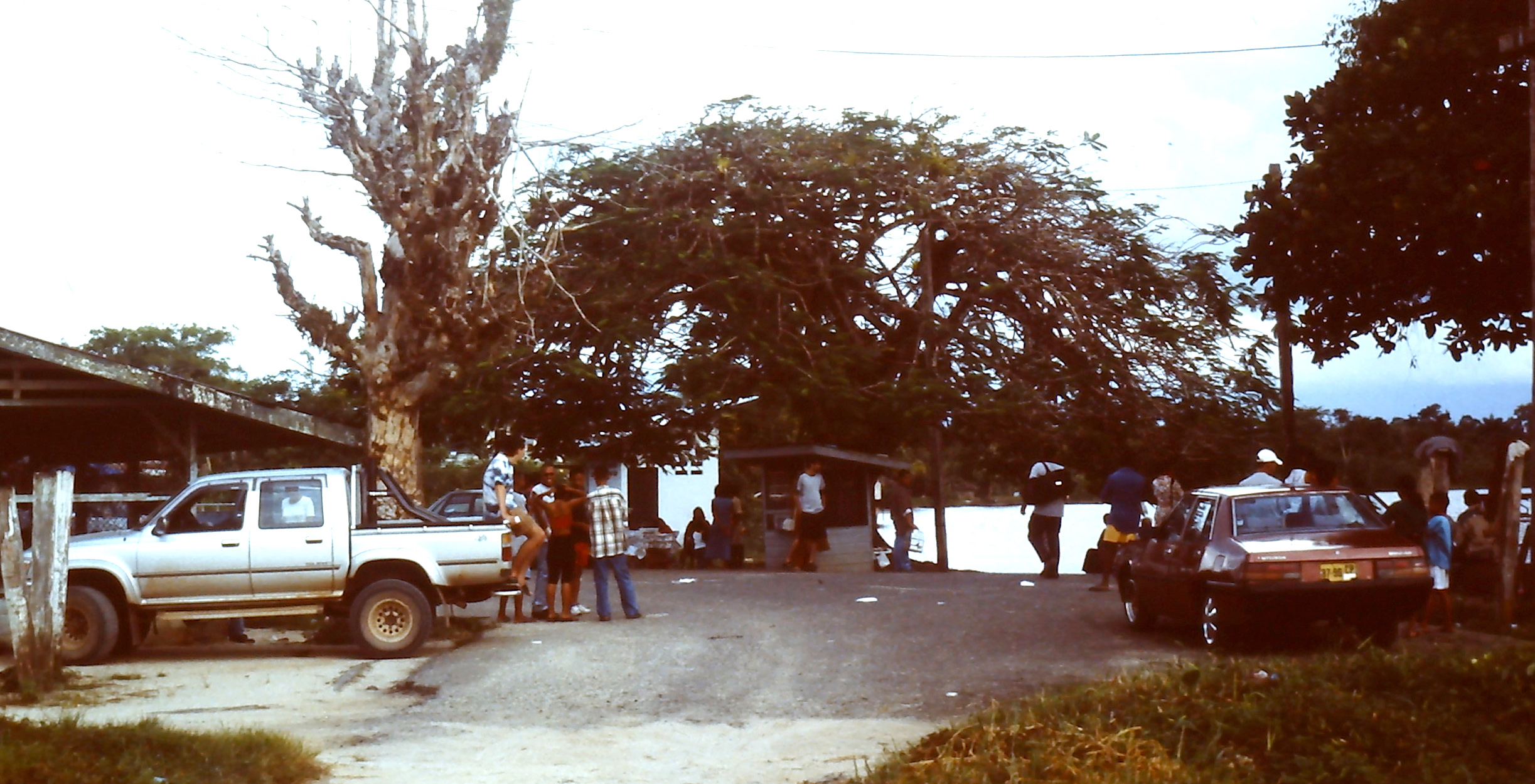
- Ferry Uitkijk (2000)

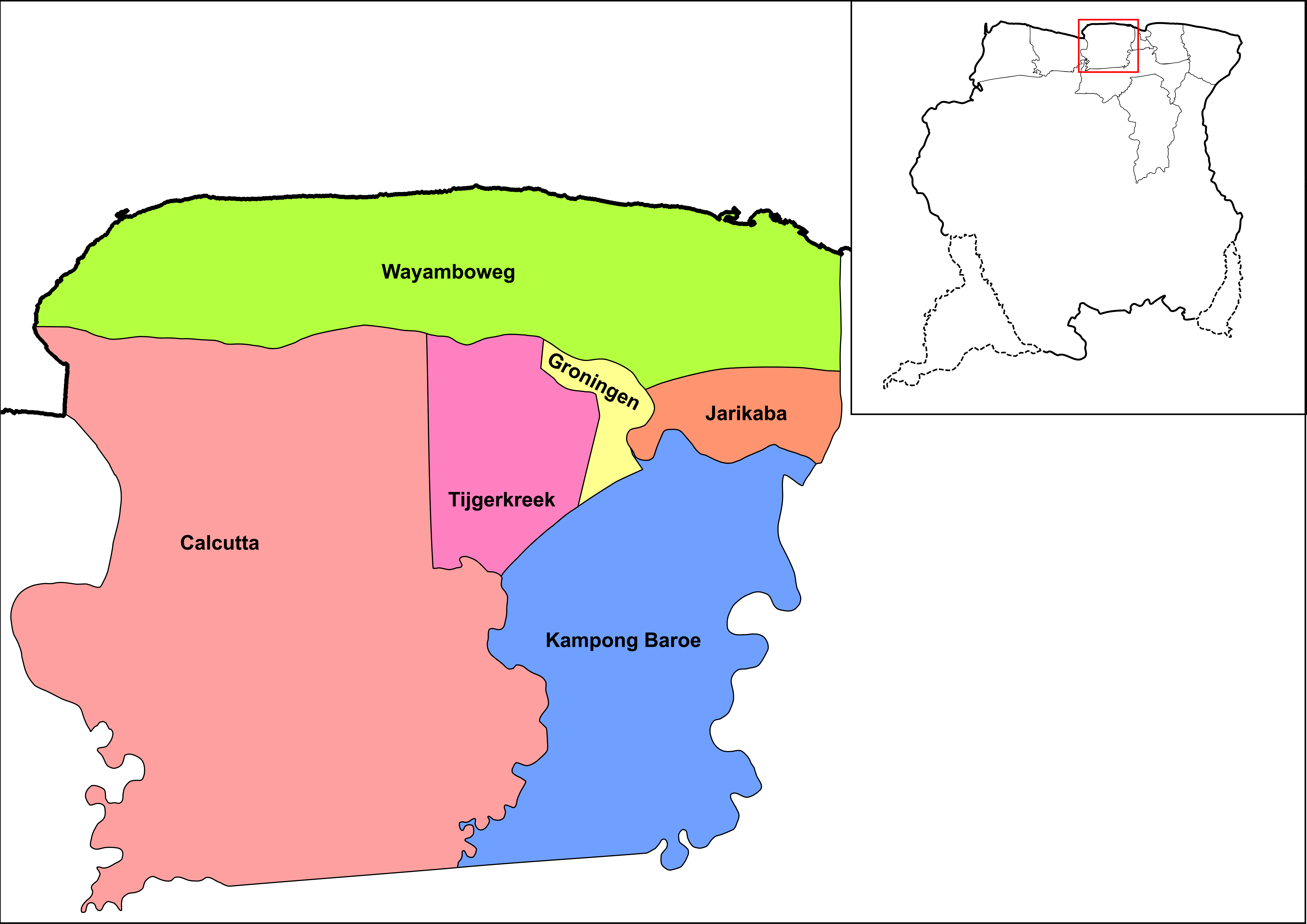
- Map showing the resorts of Saramacca District. Kampong Baroe
- Country: Suriname
- District: Saramacca District

Area
  - Total: 684 km^{2} (264 sq mi)
- Elevation: 12 m (39 ft)

Population (2012)
  - Total: 2,248
  - Density: 3.29/km^{2} (8.51/sq mi)
- Time zone: UTC-3 (AST)

Kampong Baroe (Javanese: ꦏꦩ꧀ꦥꦸꦁꦧꦫꦸ; Standard Malay: Kampung Baru) is a resort in Suriname, located in the Saramacca District. Its population at the 2012 census was 2,248, the majority being Javanese, and East Indian. The main agricultural crop is peanuts. Kampong Baroe also contains cattle, pig, and chicken farms. "Kampong Baroe" in Malay language literally means "New Village" (Kampong: Village and Baru/Baroe: New).

Kampong Baroe has a clinic, and a school. On 23 March 2020, construction of a multi functional centre started.

Other villages located in the resort are Boston, Uitkijk, Dam Parra, Totikamp, and Maho.
