= Welgelegen, Coronie District =

Coordinates: 5.87659°N 56.3306°W

- Resort
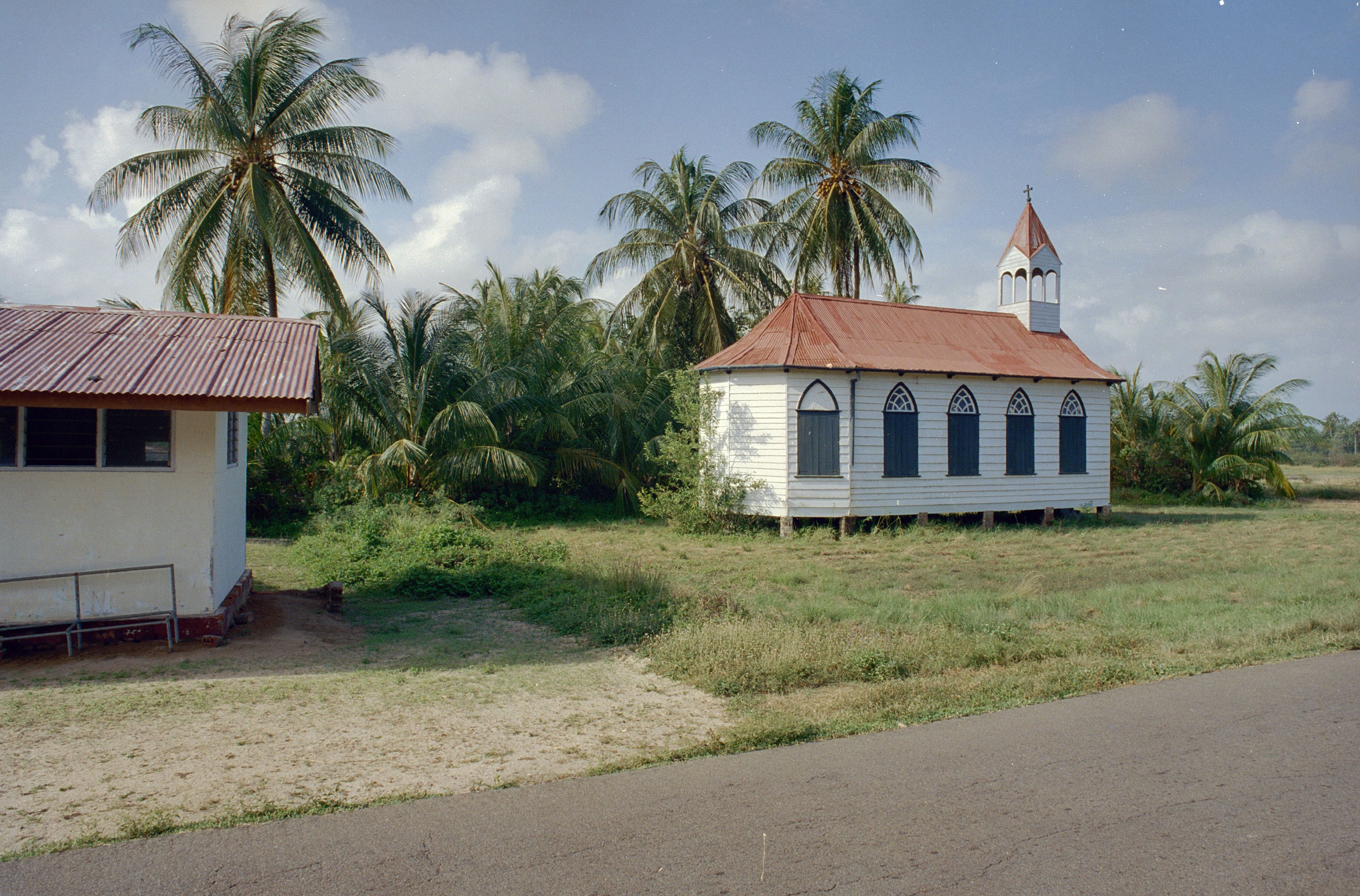
- Church in Welgelegen

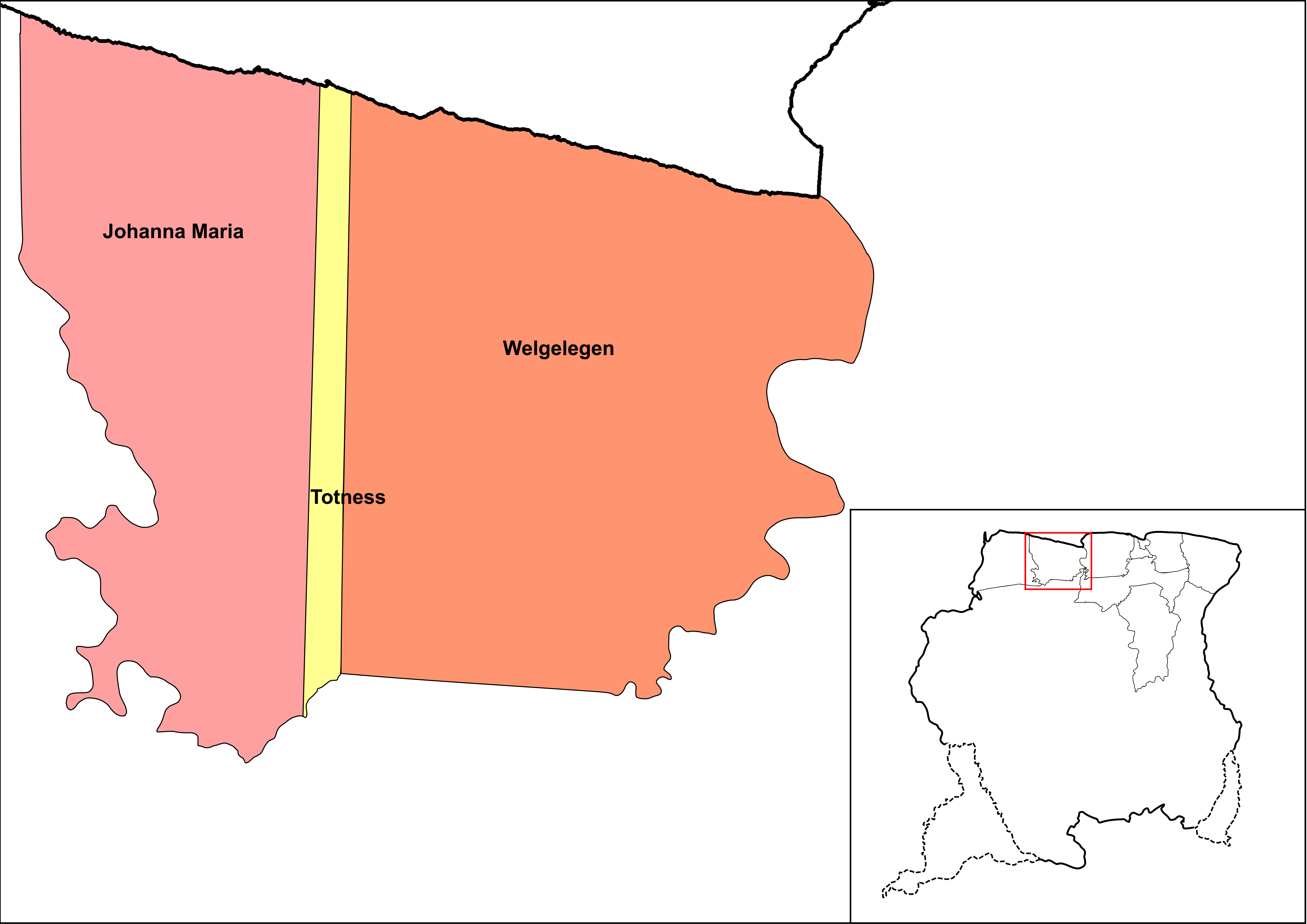
- Map showing the resorts of Coronie District. Welgelegn
- Country: Suriname
- District: Coronie District

Area
  - Total: 2,143 km^{2} (827 sq mi)

Population (2012)
  - Total: 593
  - Density: 0.277/km^{2} (0.717/sq mi)
- Time zone: UTC-3 (AST)

Welgelegen is a resort in Suriname, located in the Coronie District. Its population was 593 at the 2012 census. Welgelegen began as a cotton plantation in 1824. The church of Welgelegen was consecrated on 1 November 1883 but was not originally built at its current location; it was first erected at Cardross Park and later moved. The church is no longer in service. The villages of Jenny and Mary's Hope are also located in the Welgelegen resort.

== Peruvia Nature Reserve ==
The Peruvia Nature Reserve was founded in 1986. It is located near the mouth of the Coppename River, and covers an area of 31,000 hectares. The reserve contains moriche palms, Sandbox tree forests, and is home to the Blue-and-yellow macaw.
