= Jarikaba =

- Resort
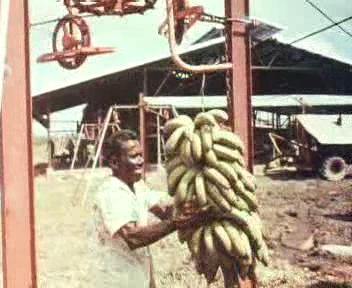
- Banana harvest in Jarikaba

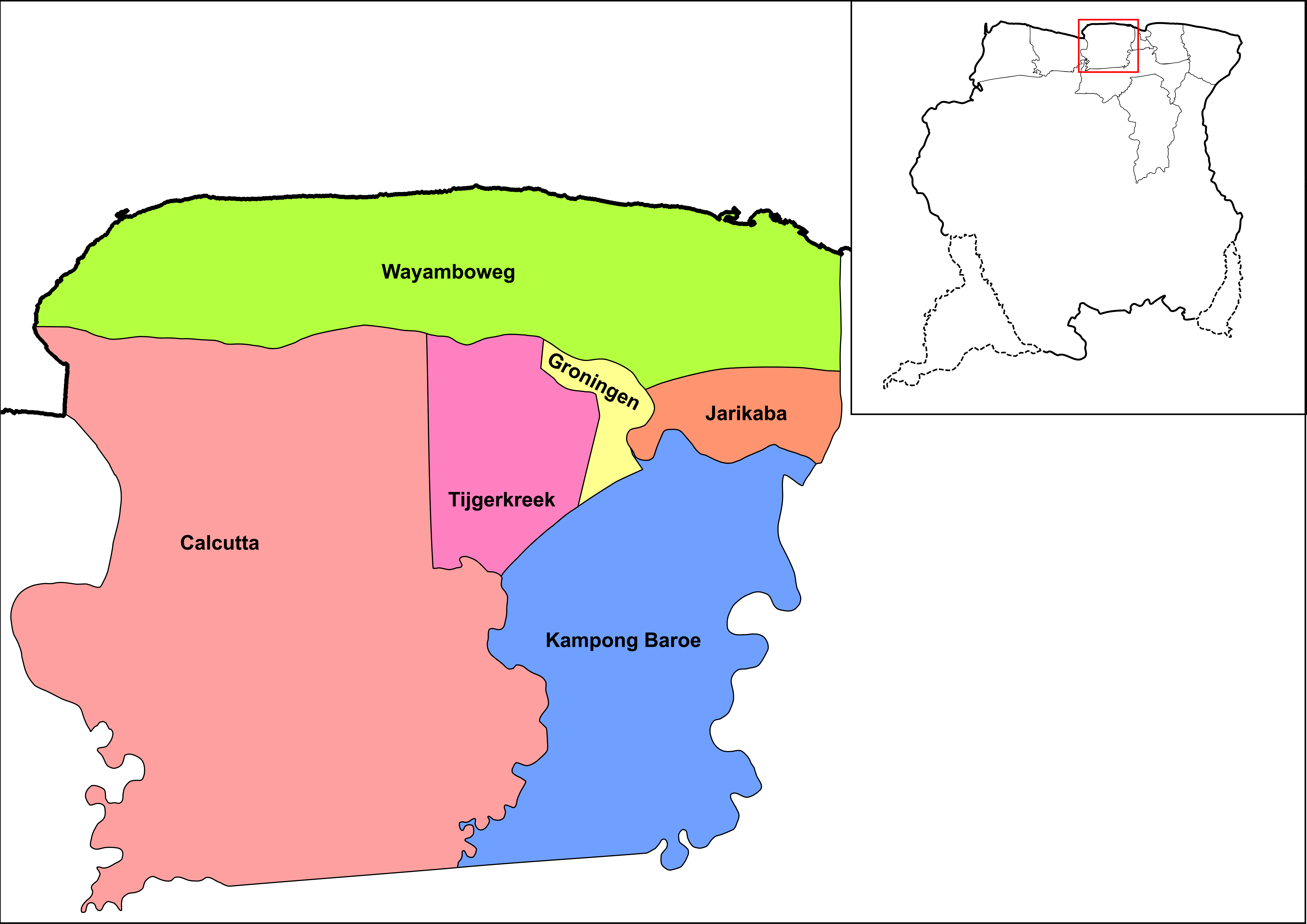
- Map showing the resorts of Saramacca District. Jarikaba
- Coordinates: 5°49′16″N 55°19′49″W
- Country: Suriname
- District: Saramacca District

Area
  - Total: 127 km^{2} (49 sq mi)

Population (2012)
  - Total: 5,963
  - Density: 47.0/km^{2} (122/sq mi)
- Time zone: UTC-3 (AST)

Jarikaba is a resort in Suriname, located in the Saramacca District. Its population at the 2012 census was 5,963. Bananas form the backbone of the economy. Food And Agriculture Industries, the main employer, has 1,200 hectares (3,000 acres) under cultivation, and a workforce of more than 1,000 people. Food And Agriculture Industries used export only to Europe, but as of 2018 supplies much of the Caribbean.

The Jarikaba Airstrip is located near Jarikaba.
