= Brooskampers =

Maroon ethnic group of Suriname

Bakabusi Nengre

Total population
- n/a

Languages
- Sranan Tongo, Dutch formerly: undefined English based creole

Religion
- Catholic Church, Winti

Related ethnic groups
- Saramaka, Aluku

The Brooskampers (also: Bakabusi Nengre) were a Maroon people, descendants of runaway African slaves, living in the forested interior of Suriname. The tribe is related to the Saramaka, and originated from Loango-Angola. The Brooskampers gained autonomy in 1863, but sold their land in 1917.

== History ==
In the 1740s, the tribe lived in the swamps near Surnau Creek in a camp founded by Tata Kukudabi. In 1772, part of the tribe left and joined the Aluku. In 1862, escaped slaves from plantation Rac à Rac joined the Brooskampers. This was during the preparations of the planned emancipation of the slaves, and therefore the existence of another tribe worried the government. The population of Brooskampers was estimated at 200 people. At first, the government tried to attack them; however, the troops got bogged down in the swamp and had to retreat.

Rorac
- Former village & plantation
- Location in Suriname
- Coordinates: 5.6527°N 55.0485°W
- Country: Suriname
- District: Commewijne District
- Resort: Meerzorg

Government
  - Captain: Broos
  - Captain: Kaliko

Area
  - Total: 9.16 km^{2} (3.54 sq mi)

Population (1862)
  - Total: ca.200
- Time zone: UTC-3

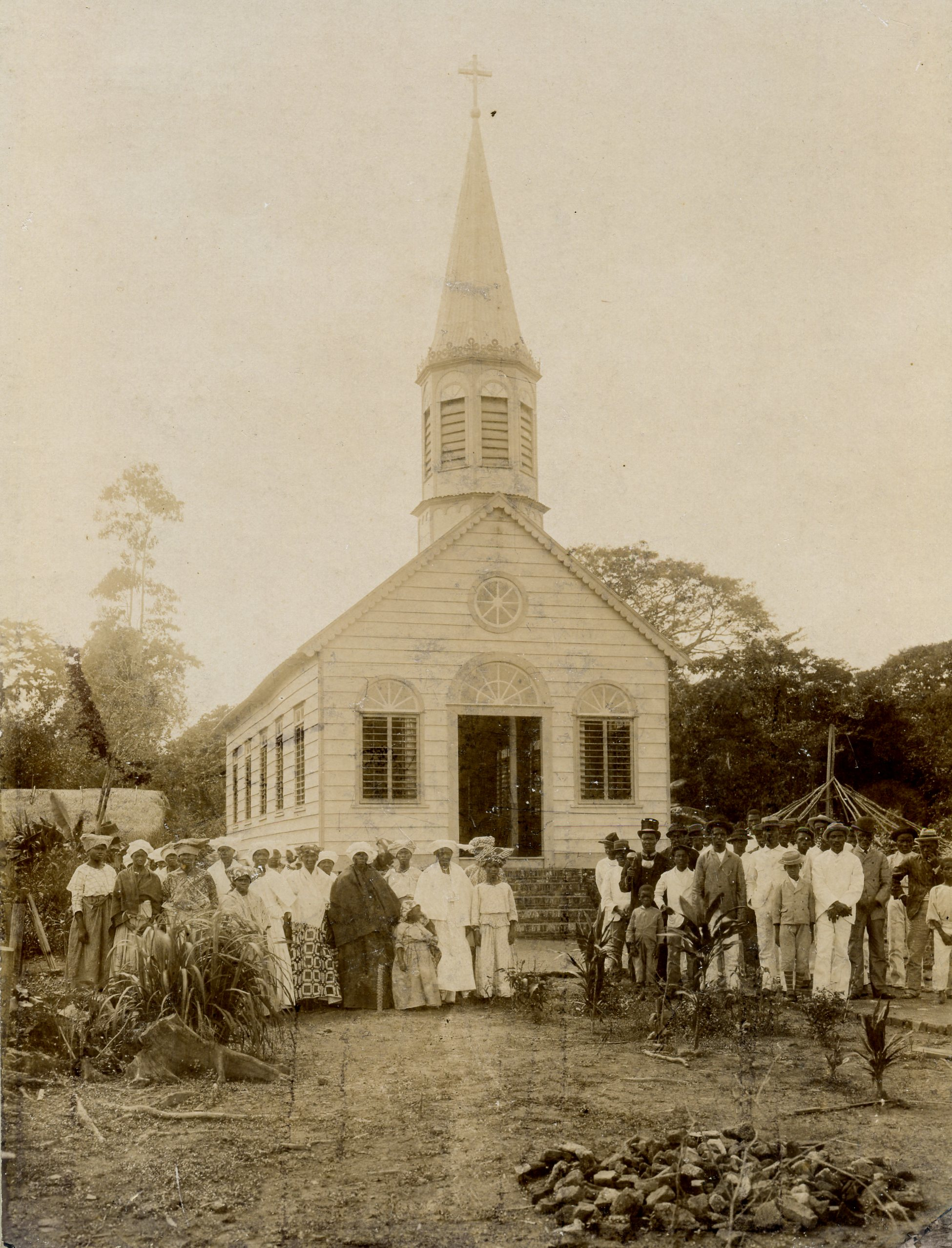
Church in Rorac (1900)

On 2 September 1863, a peace treaty was signed offering the tribe the abandoned plantations Klaverblad and Rorac. No granman (paramount chief) was appointed; instead, Broos and his brother Kaliko were installed as kabitens (captains).

At first, they did not trust the colonists and hid in the forest behind Klaverblad. However, in 1874, the Brooskampers settled at the plantations. In 1891, a temporary church was opened by the Catholic priests, who were in Bethesda on the other side of the Suriname River. In 1898, a school was opened, and in 1900, a real church was finished. Klaverblad is no longer mentioned in the 20th century. The almanac of 1910 lists Klaverblad as owned by J. Braumuller. Rorac, on the other hand, is owned by Johannes Babel, the son of Broos and his successor as Kabiten. The plantation produced cacao, maize, and rice.

Road surfacing material, which was purchased from the village, contained bauxite. In 1917, kabiten Johannes Babel and Alcoa negotiated a deal which was accepted by the tribe, the lands were sold, and the people settled in Tout-Lui-Faut near Paramaribo. In 1920, the last 20 inhabitants were asked to leave and given a ƒ500,- (€2,800 in 2018) moving premium.

In 2011, Alcoa ceased bauxite production at the site. Ronald Babel, one of the descendants, and other family members had restored the damaged graves at the plantation, and erected a Winti shrine at the site.

== Notable people ==
- Ryan Babel (born 1986), football player

== See also ==
- List of kabitens of the Brooskampers
- Saramaka

== Bibliography ==
- Hoogbergen, Wim (2009). Het kamp van Broos en Kaliko (in Dutch). Paramaribo: Vaco Publisher. ISBN 9789991400853.
- Hoogbergen, Wim (2008). Out of slavery : a Surinamese roots history. Berlin: LIT Verlag. ISBN 9783825881122.
- Scholtens, Ben (1994). Bosneger en overheid in Suriname. Radboud University Nijmegen (Thesis) (in Dutch). Paramaribo: Afdeling Cultuurstudies/Minov. ISBN 9991410155.
