= Johanna Maria =

Coordinates: 5.8501°N 56.4698°W

- Resort
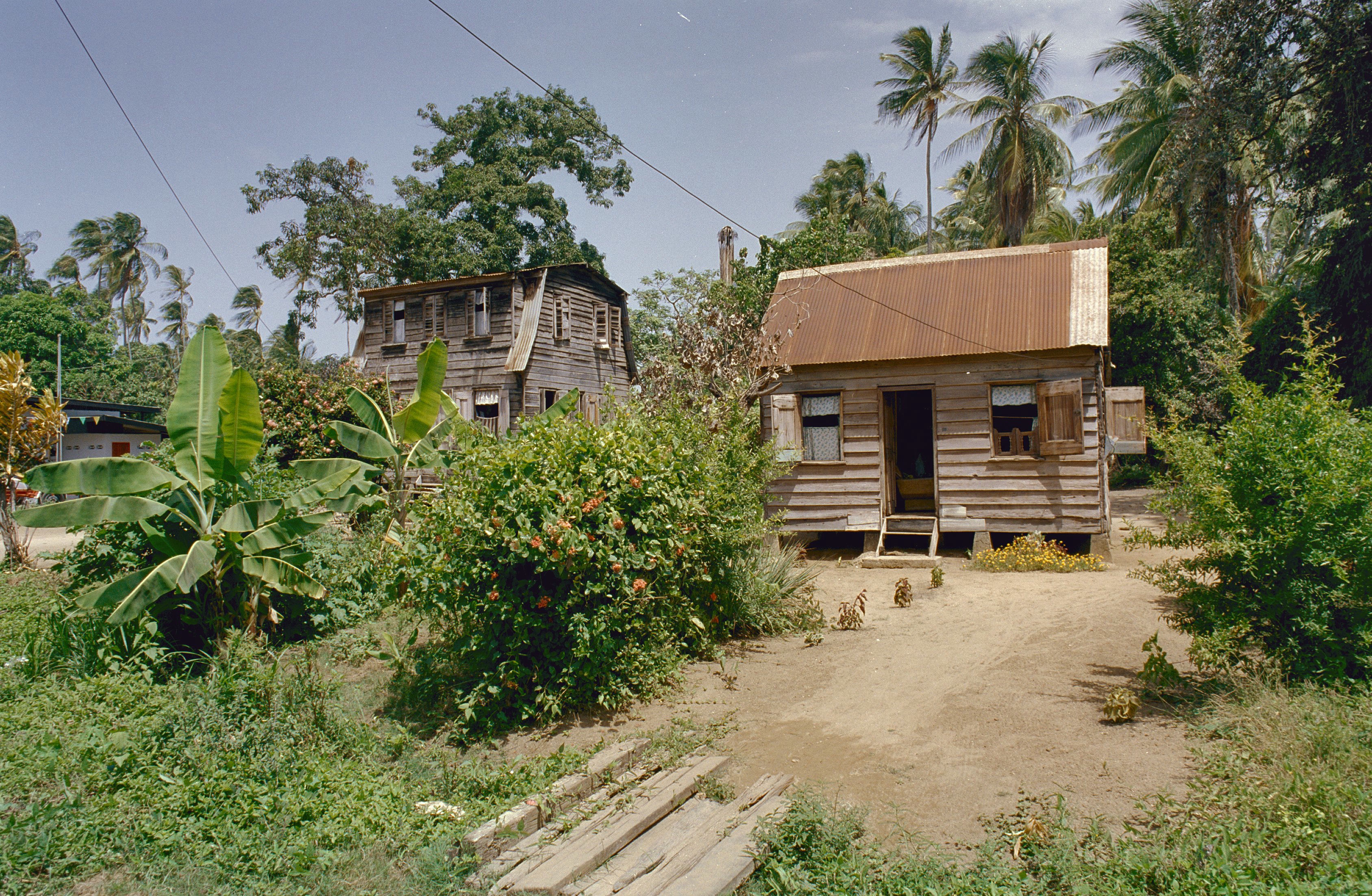
- Houses in Burnside

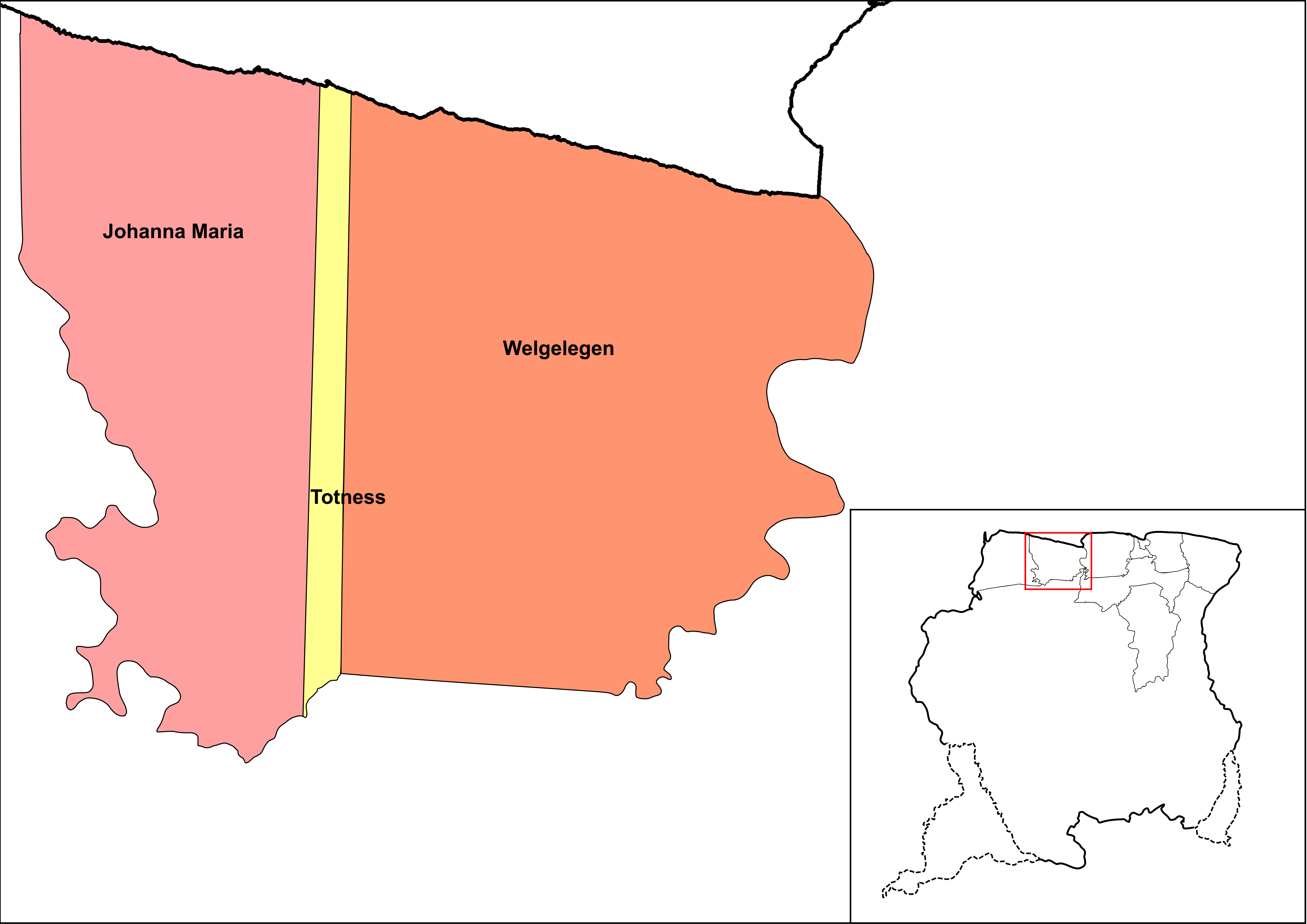
- Map showing the resorts of Coronie District. Johanna Maria
- Country: Suriname
- District: Coronie District

Area
  - Total: 1,586 km^{2} (612 sq mi)

Population (2012)
  - Total: 648
  - Density: 0.409/km^{2} (1.06/sq mi)
- Time zone: UTC-3 (AST)

Johanna Maria is a town and resort in Suriname, located in the Coronie District. Its population at the 2012 census was 648. The town is named after the cotton plantation Johanna Maria founded in 1801 which was owned by Johanna Maria Christina van Onna from 1863 onwards. The coast line is subject to flooding and erosion caused by the degradation of the mangrove forests. Plans have been drawn up to construct a 12 kilometre long dike near the coast.

Johanna Maria has a school, and clinic, but the area from Clyde to Burnside has no electricity, or telephone. In 1970 the Krioro Masanga was built in Johanna Maria, a multi purpose information and recreation building with a theatre and a library.
