= Wayamboweg =

Coordinates: 5.88681°N 55.4468°W

- Resort
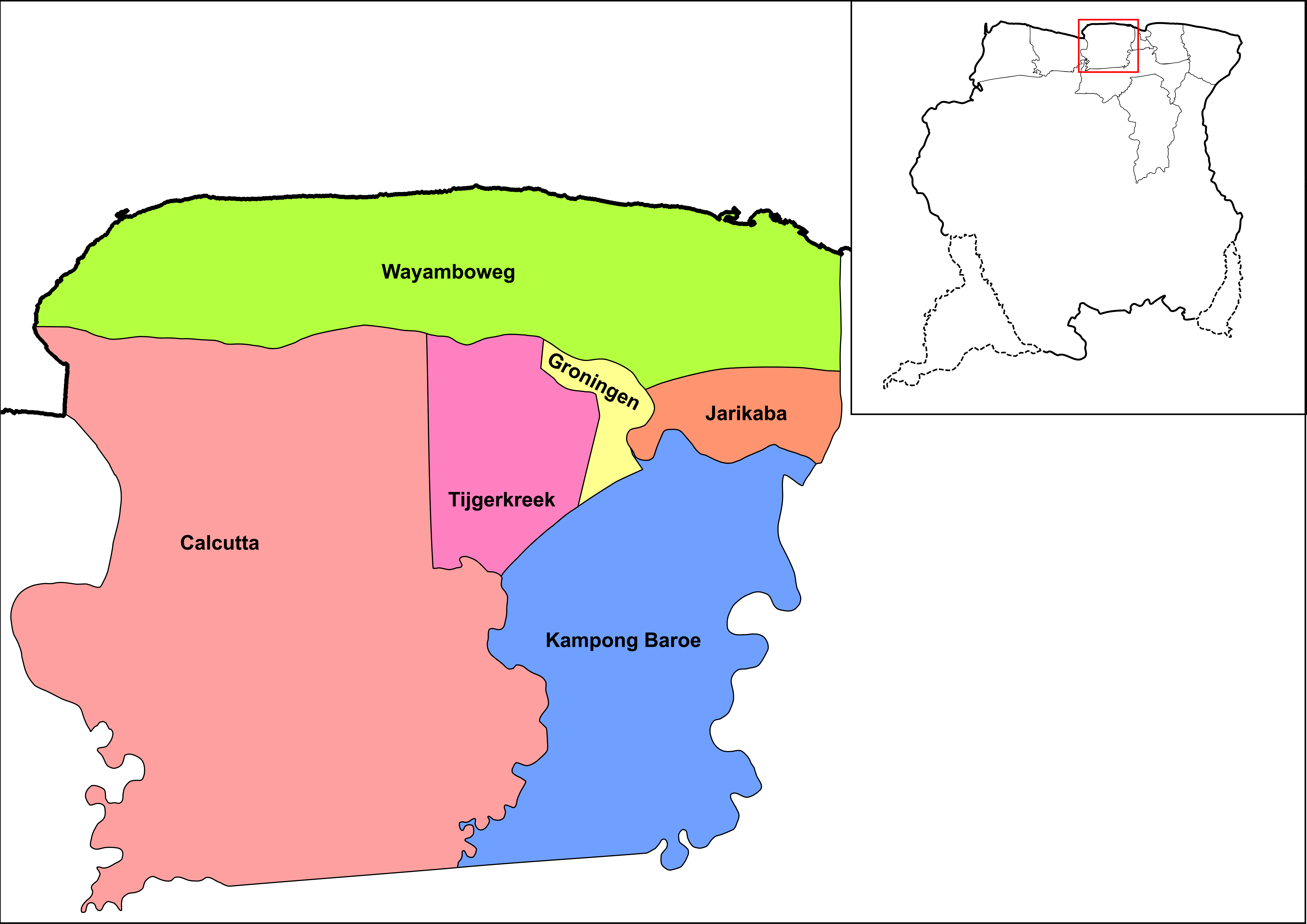
- Map showing the resorts of Saramacca District. Wayamboweg
- Country: Suriname
- District: Saramacca District

Area
  - Total: 872 km^{2} (337 sq mi)

Population (2012)
  - Total: 1,560
  - Density: 1.79/km^{2} (4.63/sq mi)
- Time zone: UTC-3 (AST)

Wayamboweg is a resort in Suriname, located in the Saramacca District. Its population at the 2012 census was 1,560. The largest ethnic group is East Indian. The resort is mainly agricultural. A rice project has started in late 2017.

In the early 21st century, a high school has been opened. The resort is located near the ocean, and tourism facilities are being developed in the resort. Staatsolie is drilling for oil in the Wayambozwamp.

The village of Smithfield is located in the area.
