= Boskamp, Suriname =

Boskamp
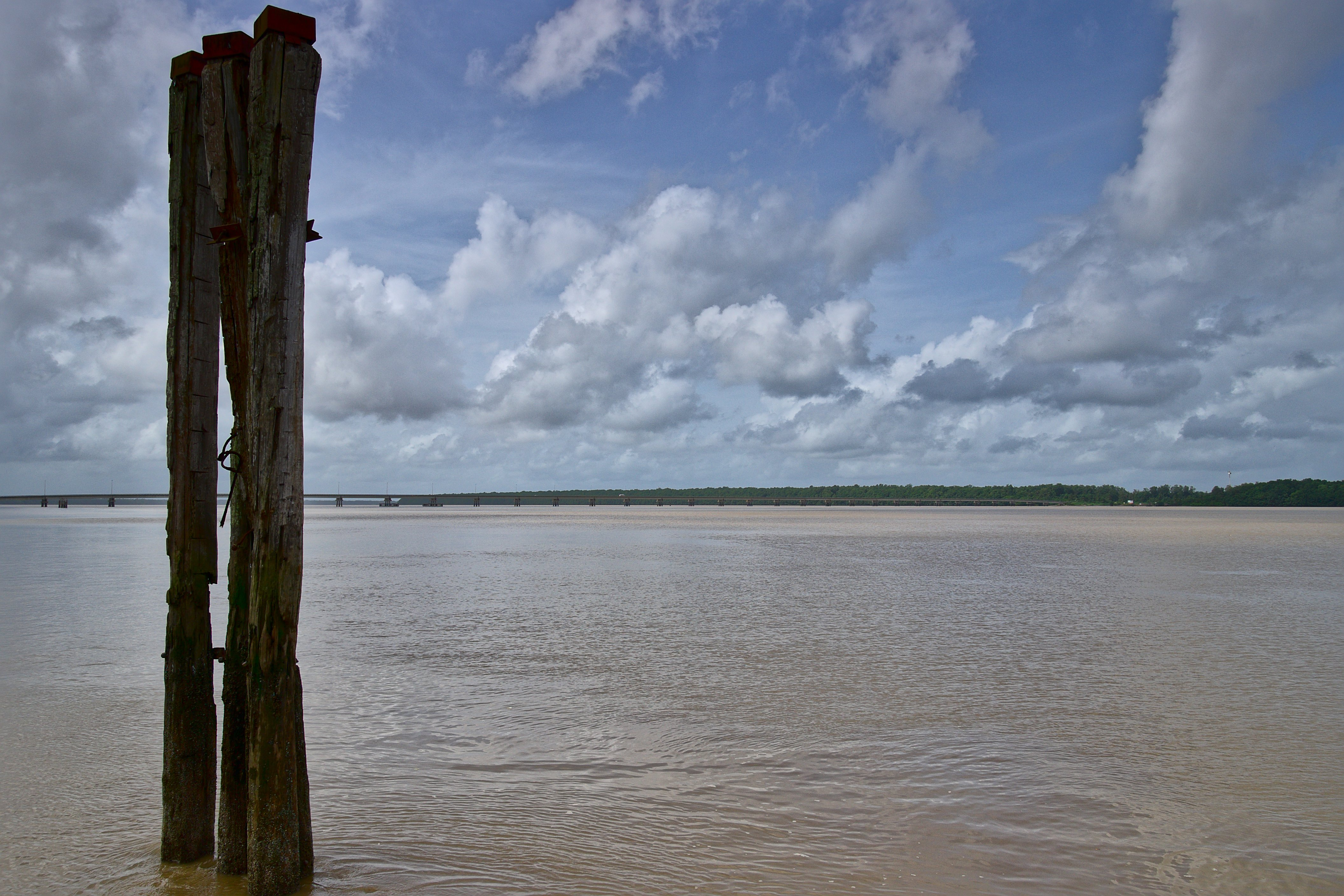
- The Coppename River with the bridge in the distance

- Location in Suriname
- Coordinates: 5°47′11″N 55°53′43″W
- Country: Suriname
- District: Saramacca District
- Resort: Calcutta

Boskamp is a town on the East-West Link in Suriname, in the central north of the country, in the Calcutta resort of the Saramacca District. It lies opposite to Jenny, to which it is connected via the Coppename bridge. Boskamp is mainly a fishing village.

In the 1940s the Coronie District was released from its isolation when the Samaraccaweg was extended to Boskamp. In 1999, the ferry was replaced with the Coppename bridge.

In 1990, a fishing station was opened with Belgian aid. In 2016, a health care centre was opened in Boskamp. In 2018, oil had been discovered near Boskamp.
