= Uitkijk =

- Village
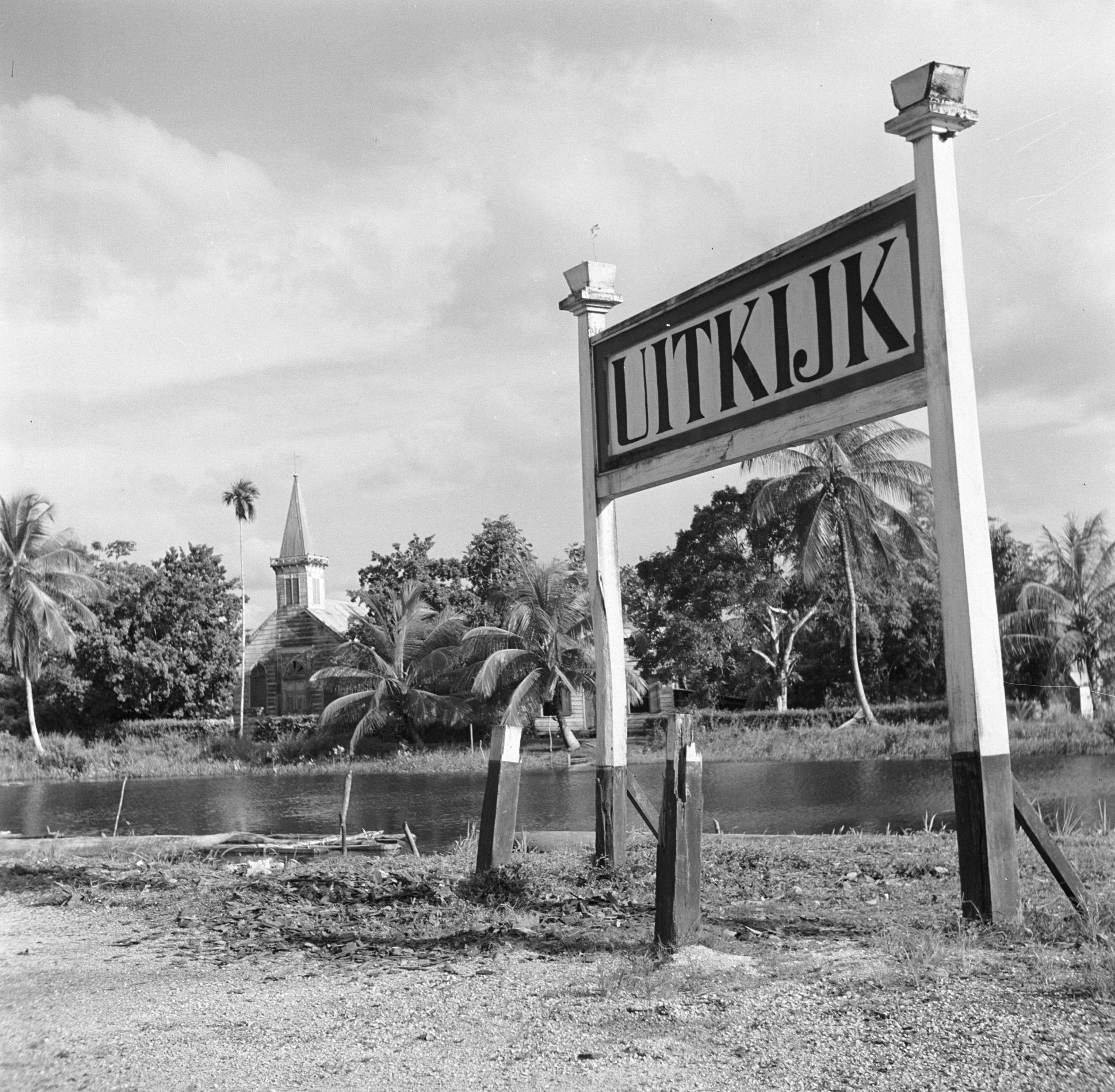
- The ferry and village of Uitkijk (1947)

- Location within Suriname
- Coordinates: 5.776667°N 55.3475°W
- Country: Suriname
- District: Saramacca District
- Resort: Kampong Baroe
- Time zone: UTC-3 (AST)

Uitkijk is a village in the resort of Kampong Baroe in the Saramacca District of Suriname. The village is located on the Saramacca River.

== History ==
The village started as a wood plantation, In 1778, a military outpost was established at Uitkijk, because of its strategic importance: all river traffic from Paramaribo heading west had to pass through Uitkijk. Between 1789 and 1793, the Boni War was fought against runaway slaves. 44 of the captured slaves were born in the forest, and resettled in Uitkijk. The military outpost does not exist any more, however the police station for the region is located in Uitkijk.

In 1936, a road was constructed between Hamburg and Groningen which allowed cars to travel west from Paramaribo, however at Uitkijk, a ferry was needed across the Saramacca River. In 2011, a bridge was opened.
