= Saramacca District =

District of Suriname

Saramacca Saamakaliba (Eastern Maroon Creole)
- District
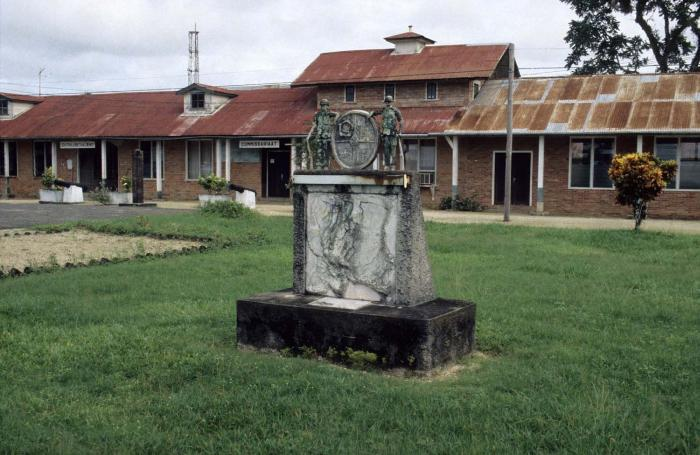

- Map of Suriname showing Saramacca district
- Coordinates: 5°46′57″N 55°37′29″W
- Country: Suriname
- Capital: Groningen

Area
  - Total: 3,636 km^{2} (1,404 sq mi)

Population (2012 census)
  - Total: 17,480
  - Density: 4.807/km^{2} (12.45/sq mi)
- Time zone: UTC-3

Saramacca (Eastern Maroon Creole: Saamakaliba or just Saamaka) is a district of Suriname, in the north. Saramacca's capital city is Groningen, with other towns and cities including Batavia, Kampong Baroe, Uitkijk, Maho and Boskamp. Saramacca has a population of 17,480 and an area of 3,636 km^{2}.

Saramaka is also the name of a group of Maroons who established communities along the Saramacca River having fled slavery.

== History ==
The district was founded in 1983, but the history dates back to 1790 when the first plantation was opened. Until 1936, Saramacca could only be access by boat, but with the construction of a road to Paramaribo, which is now part of the East-West Link, Saramacca was removed for its isolation. In 1982, oil was discovered in Sarammacca which boosted its economy. On 13 December 2014, Staatsolie opened an oil refinery.

== Agriculture ==
The district has traditionally been the site of dozens of small, family owned farming communities, and it has only been recently that large agricultural projects have begun to emerge, primarily geared to the production of bananas, rice, and peanuts. Boskamp is a fishing village.

== Nature ==
The district is known for its birds, with ornithologists and birdwatchers coming from all over the world to study and admire Saramacca's toucans, parrots and cocks-of-the-rock.

Saramacca is home to three nature reserves: Coppename Monding Nature Reserve (12,000 hectares), Boven Coesewijne Nature Reserve (27,000 hectares) and the Noord Saramacca Special Control Area (88,400 hectares).

== Resorts ==
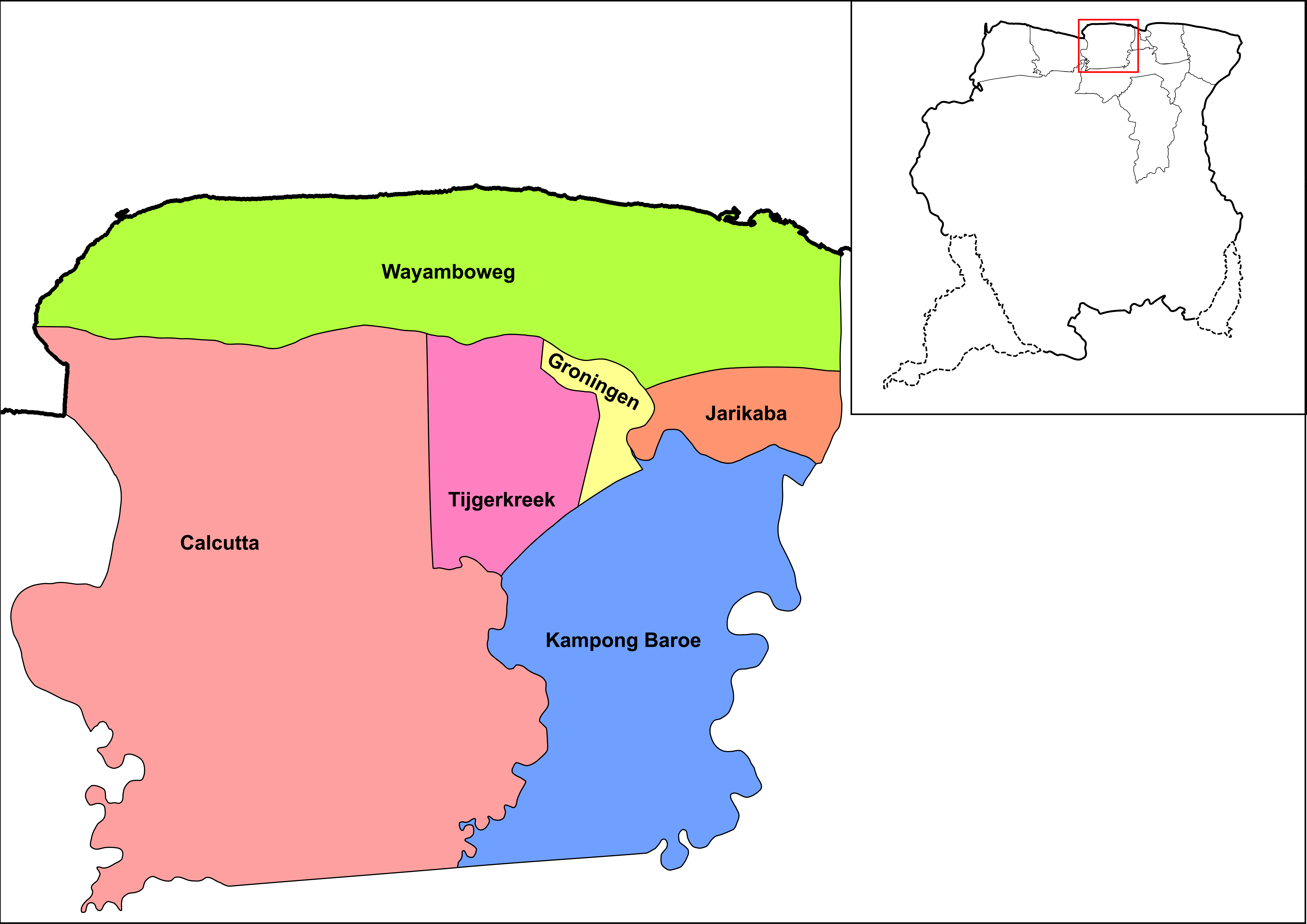
Resorts of Saramacca

Saramacca is divided into 6 resorts (ressorten):

- Calcutta
- Groningen
- Jarikaba
- Kampong Baroe
- Tijgerkreek
- Wayamboweg

== Villages ==
- Batavia
- Boskamp
- Boston
- Kalebaskreek
- Smithfield
- Uitkijk
