= Peter Donders =

Dutch Roman Catholic missionary

Blessed Peter Norbert Donders C.Ss.R.
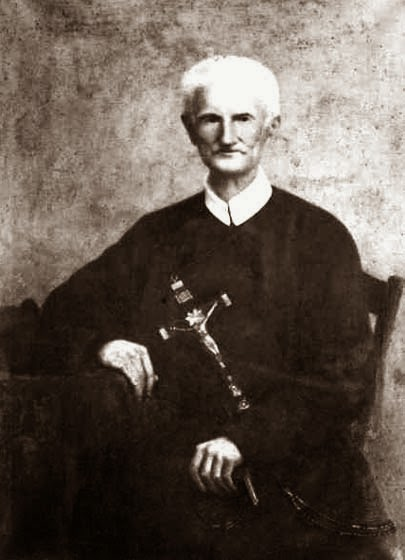
- Photograph c. 1880s

Priest
- Born: 27 October 1809; Tilburg, Kingdom of Holland
- Died: 14 January 1887 (aged 79); Batavia, Suriname
- Venerated in: Roman Catholic Church
- Beatified: 23 May 1982, Saint Peter's Square, Vatican City by Pope John Paul II
- Major shrine: Saint Peter and Paul Cathedral, Paramaribo
- Feast: 14 January

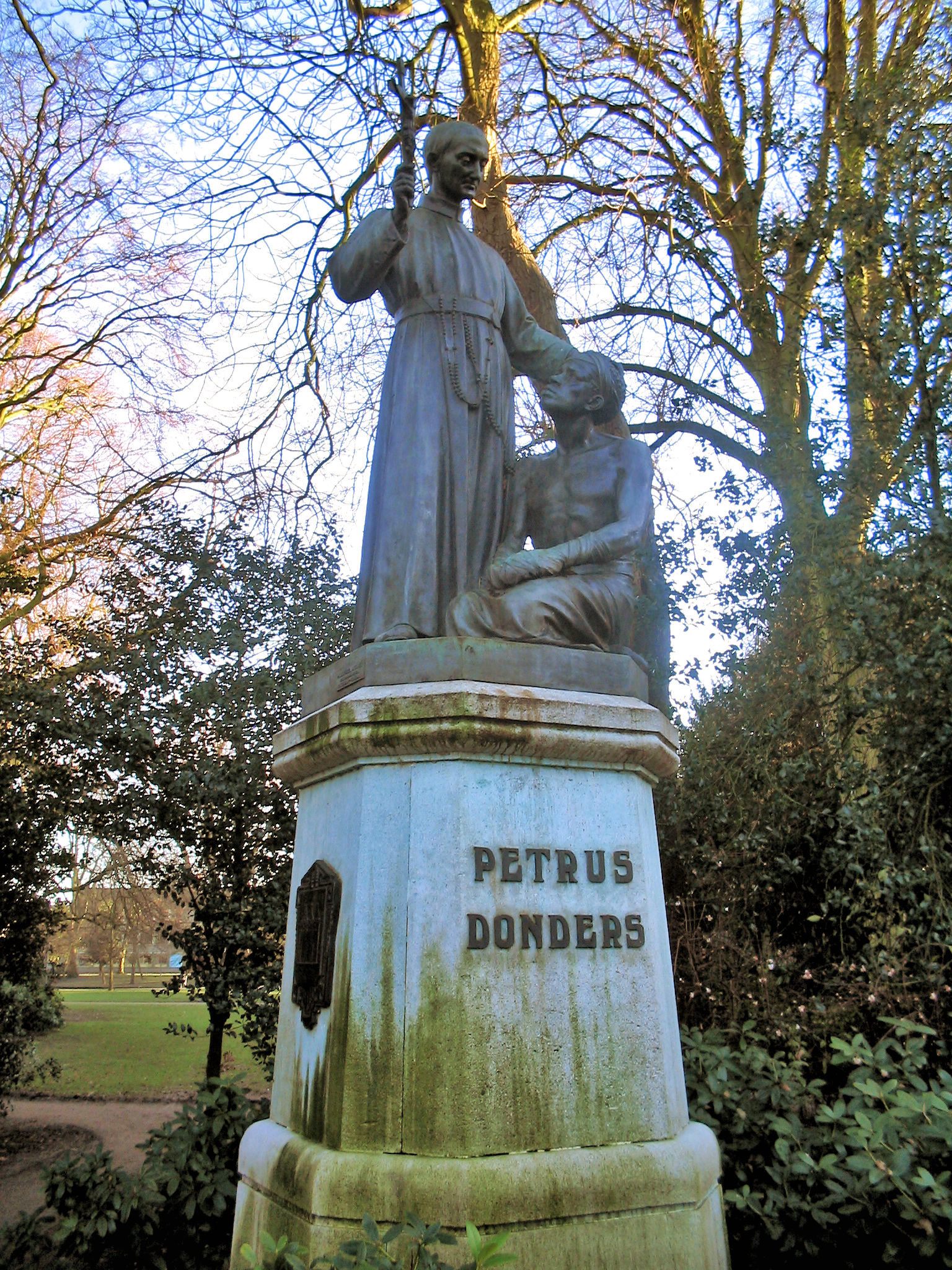
Petrus Donders statue in Wilhelminapark, Tilburg (1926)

Petrus Norbertus Donders (27 October 1809 – 14 January 1887) was a Dutch Roman Catholic priest and member of the Redemptorists. He served in various missions in the Dutch colony of Surinam. He started working in the capital Paramaribo, but is predominantly known for his work in and around the leper colony Batavia, where he died in 1887. Peter Donders was beatified as 'Apostle of the Indians and Lepers' in 1982. The miracle needed for his beatification was found in the cure of a Dutch child from bone cancer back in 1929.

== Life ==
Peter Donders was born in Tilburg in the Kingdom of Holland (current-day Netherlands) on 27 October 1809 as the eldest of two children to Arnoldus Donders and Petronella van den Brekel. His mother died when he was seven. He desired to become a priest, but his father could not afford proper education. Donders worked in the local textile industry. Later he attended Beekvliet seminary in Sint-Michielsgestel. In 1831 he was deemed unfit for military service. In 1833 he applied to join the Jesuits in Belgium but was denied; he met the same results from the Redemptorists and Franciscans. Then a benefactor enabled him to pursue his theological studies at the College of Haaren, which he entered in 1837.

Reports in the Annals of the Propagation of the Faith, a journal about various Catholic missions, attracted Donders interest to go abroad and work among the 'Indians' in America. In 1839 Surinam apostolic prefect Jacobus Grooff visited the College of Haaren in search of missionaries for the colony (now the independent Republic of Suriname). Donders applied and was accepted. He was ordained to priesthood in 1841.

In September 1843 Donders arrived in Paramaribo, where he was a chaplain for 14 years. He served under four successive vicars. From Paramaribo he visited some plantations owned by Catholics along the Suriname River and Commewijne River. In 1856 apostolic vicar Jacobus Schepers appointed Donders pastor at the mission post of Batavia along the Coppename River. This remote place, a former cocoa plantation, was a governmental leper colony (since 1824), having a permanent Catholic residence (since 1836). In 1853 it counted 453 enslaved Afro-Surinamese lepers.

In 1865 the Holy See assigned the Surinam mission to the Dutch Redemptorists. Now Donders could join the congregation. He was vested in the habit by vicar Johannes Swinkels on 1 November 1866, and made his final vows in Paramaribo on 24 June 1867. Having more assistants in Batavia father Donders was now able to make missionary journeys. He visited plantations along the Saramacca River and visited relatively independent communities in the interior, such as the Arawak, Warao and Kalina and the Afro American Kwinti people (Bushinengue). He converted few.

In 1882 Donders was called back to Paramaribo by vicar Johannes Schaap who send him to Mary's Hope, a mission post in the Coronie District that was in fact a cotton plantation. In October 1885 Schaap restationed Donders at Batavia, where he died due to a kidney infection (nephritis) on January 14, 1887. Peter Donders was buried in the Batavia cemetery, next to the church.

== Veneration ==
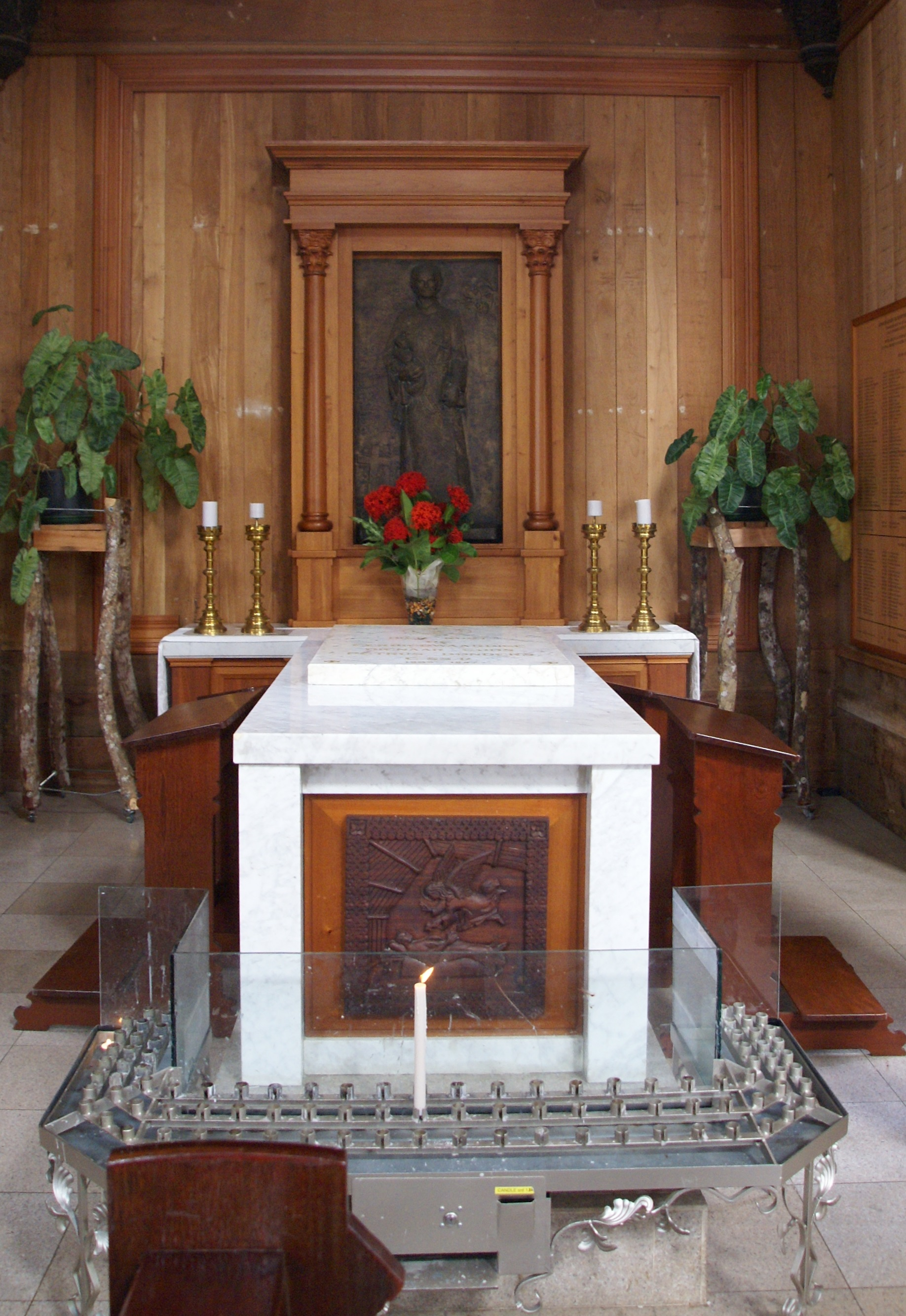
Tomb in Paramaribo, Suriname

The Redemptorists initiated a process for Donders' canonization, both in Suriname and in the Netherlands. The first steps were taken by the bishops of the 's-Hertogensboch and Paramaribo dioceses in 1900.

=== Remains ===
On January 14, 1887, Donders' died and was buried in a temporary grave in Batavia's cemetery the following day. In 1900, Donders' remains were transferred and interred in St. Peter and Paul's graveyard in Paramaribo, and in 1921 relocated to a tomb in the left wing of the church. The tomb was renovated in 2010 together with the interior of the cathedral. Since 2017, Batavia has become a tourist and pilgrimage site under the management of the Foundation Devotion Petrus Donders.

=== Netherlands ===
In 1900 the Redemptorists bought the land around Donders' birthplace in the north of Tilburg. In 1923, a memorial stone was placed at the site and a Surinam-like chapel erected, next to which a processional park was laid out. In 1926 a Petrus Donders statue was erected in Wilhelminapark, central Tilburg. In 1930 Donders' house of birth was reconstructed. That year a second Donders monument was unveiled in his native soil, depicting different aspects of his life. To complete the site as a place of pilgrimage a Museum of Charity was opened in the park in 2009. The museum and surrounding park is managed by the Tilburg Petrus Donders Foundation since 2014.

=== Apostolic process ===
Donders' spiritual writings were approved by theologians on 13 December 1911, and his cause was formally opened on 14 May 1913, granting him the title of Servant of God. Subsequently, in 1914, 1915 and 1919, apostolic processes were held for his beatification. A proposed miraculous healing in 1929 of the Tilburg born child Ludovicus Johann Westland was rejected twice by the Vatican medical commission of the Congregation for Rites, in 1931 and in 1936. During the Second World War three more meetings were held in Rome discussing Donders' cause. All objections of the devil's advocate were refuted by the general postulator. Then, on 25 March 1945, Pope Pius XII declared him venerable, which means that Donders had practiced his virtues 'to an heroic degree'.

In 1976, the Redemptorists once again presented Westland's healing, but now with some new information; the bone infection had been cured overnight, which could not be explained naturally. In 1978 this was approved by the medical experts of the C.C.S. as did the cardinal and bishop members. Exemption was granted for a second miracle that would have otherwise been needed for Donders to be beatified under the old rules that were still in force regarding sainthood causes. This led to the beatification of Donders by Pope John Paul II on 23 May 1982. The beatification coincided with the 250th anniversary of the Redemptorists, founded in 1732. The current general postulator for this cause is the Redemptorist priest Antonio Marrazzo.

== Statue controversy ==
Since the beatification in 1982 by the Catholic Church, the bronze Petrus Donders statue, placed within central Tilburg in 1926, has been subject to debate due to its hierarchic composition. The “kneeling leper”, a nameless, enslaved African, is perceived to be linked to colonialism and slavery.

In 2016 Gloria Wekker stated that the sculpture is a representation of inequality. In an open letter the Dutch political party Ubuntu Connected Front (UCF) requested the municipality of Tilburg to move the sculpture, containing two human beings, out of public space. According to UCF it portrays a Eurocentric and Afrophobic narrative. A museum would be a better and appropriate place for it. The statue is owned by the municipality. The city council expressed its concerns in 2021 and asked for a proper contextualization. An explanatory sign was placed in front of the statue in 2022, with the following text (translated into English):

You see a bronze statue of two men: one man kneeling, one man standing. The kneeling man is a leper from Suriname. The standing man is priest Peter Donders, better known in Tilburg as Peerke Donders. The statue was placed in 1926. At that time, such a representation was common. Today we consider it an undeniable symbol of colonial rule. Of the historic person, Peter Donders himself, we have a more positive imagination. He cared about the fate of the slaves in the leprosy colony Batavia in Suriname, and worked for them for many years.

Nowadays we look very critically at our colonial and slavery past. A painful and confrontational chapter in our history. In Tilburg we do not avoid the conversation about this, taking into account the deeply felt emotion of everyone to be seen, heard and appreciated. Therefore the statue in front of you is controversial. At the same time, it also invites you to have that conversation.

Preserving this statue in public space is part of this ongoing debate in the city about our history, our slavery past and also about the inclusive city we want to be, in Tilburg. What do you think?

In 2023 Erasmus University Prof. Maria Grever stated that the statue has lost its 'white innocence'. Within a postcolonial framework, the statue is perceived as a narrative of submission and racism. Many people in Tilburg, although aware of multi-perspectivity, still find it difficult to imagine that Donders' statue with the kneeling black man brings back the image of African Surinamese as objects of patronizing care. According to Grever, discourses of colonialism, racism and missionary work strengthened the Dutch civilising mission in the colonies, which was based on a western conception of progress, white superiority and the malleability of society. In the 1920s, this mixed discourse particularly appealed to Catholics in the Netherlands, because they had occupied a second-rate position in the country for centuries. Therefore the statue also represents the triumphant progress of Catholic emancipation in the Netherlands.

== Gallery ==
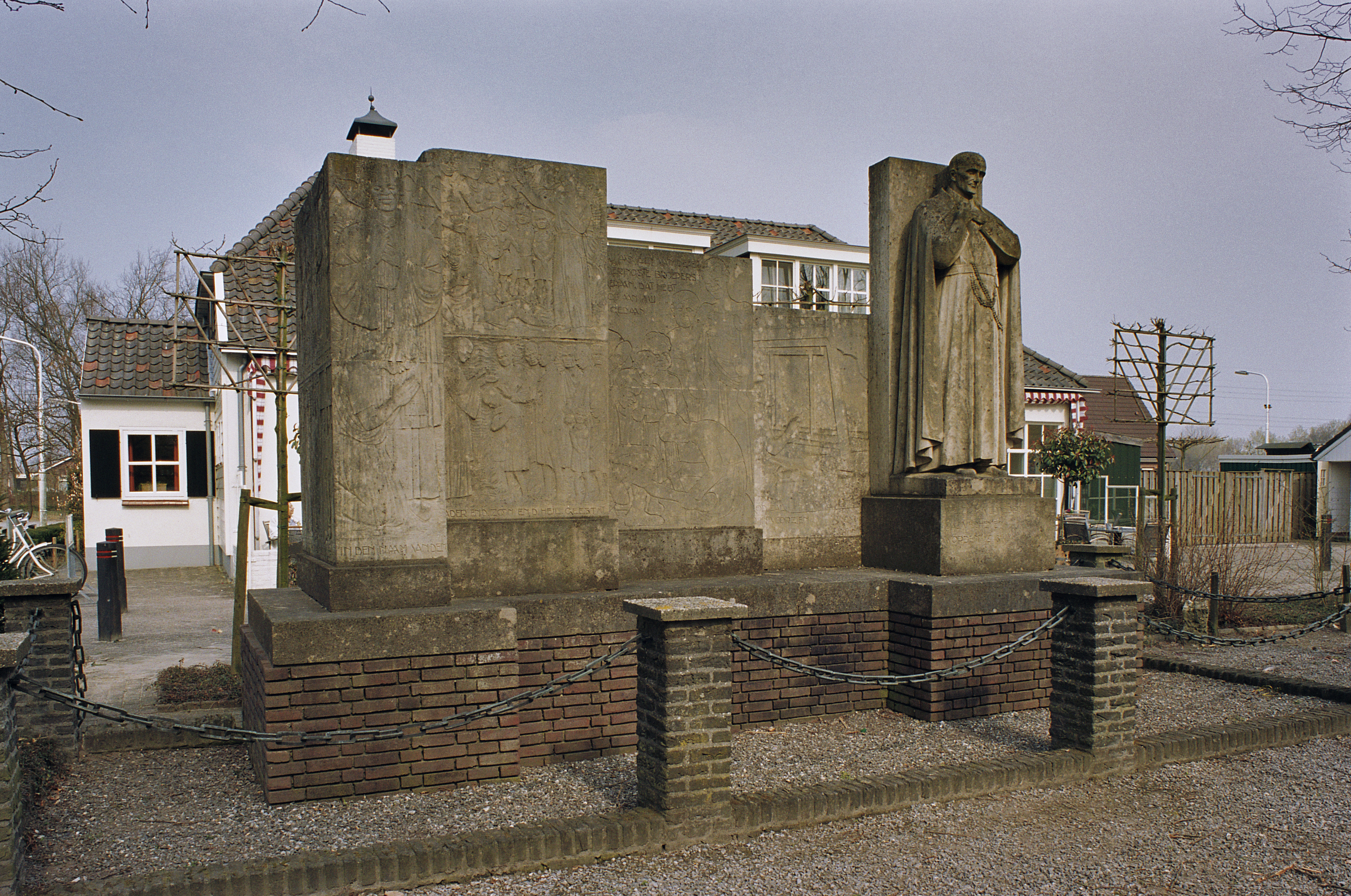
Peter Donders monument, Tilburg

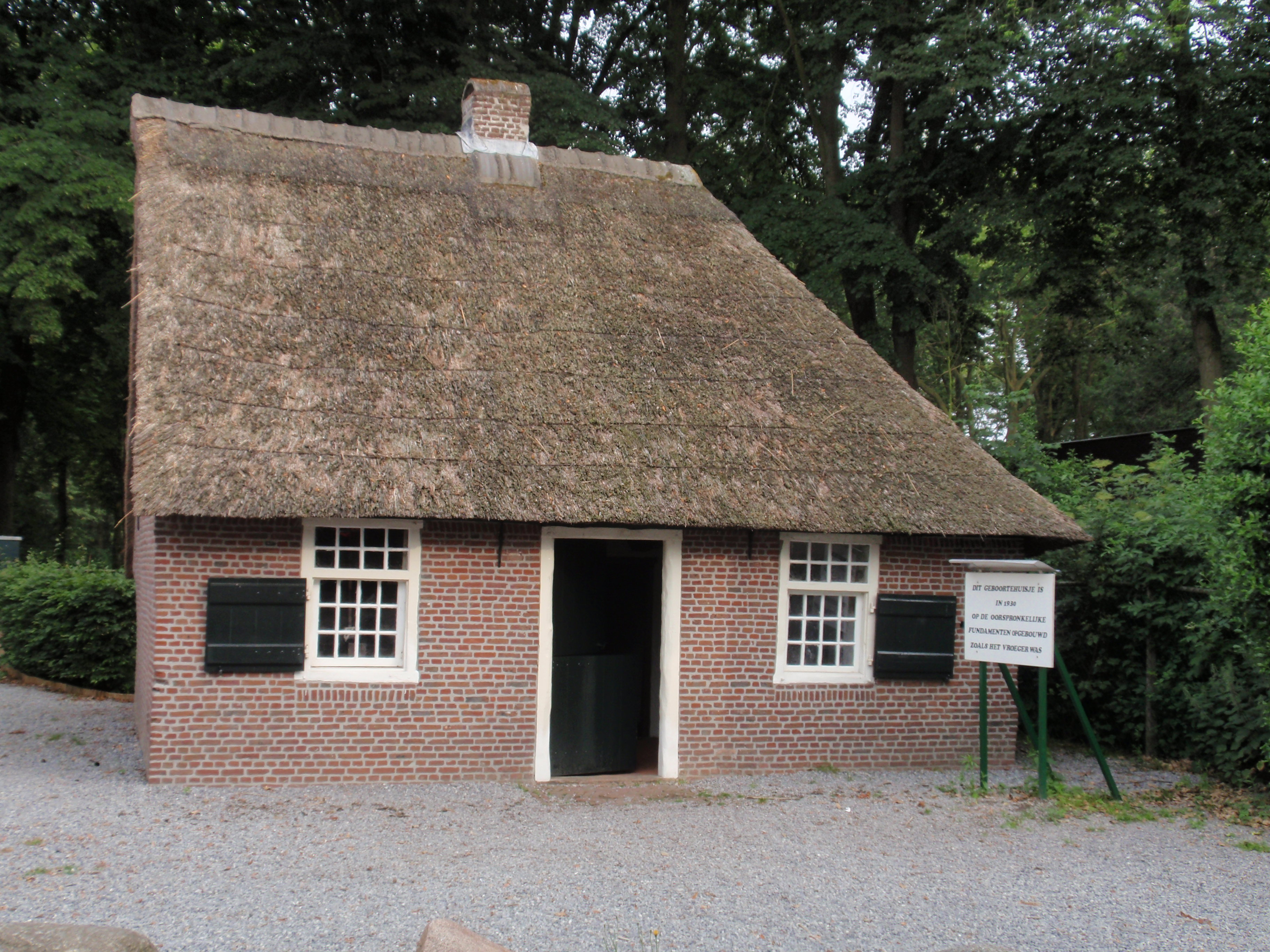
Birthplace in Tilburg (reconstruction)

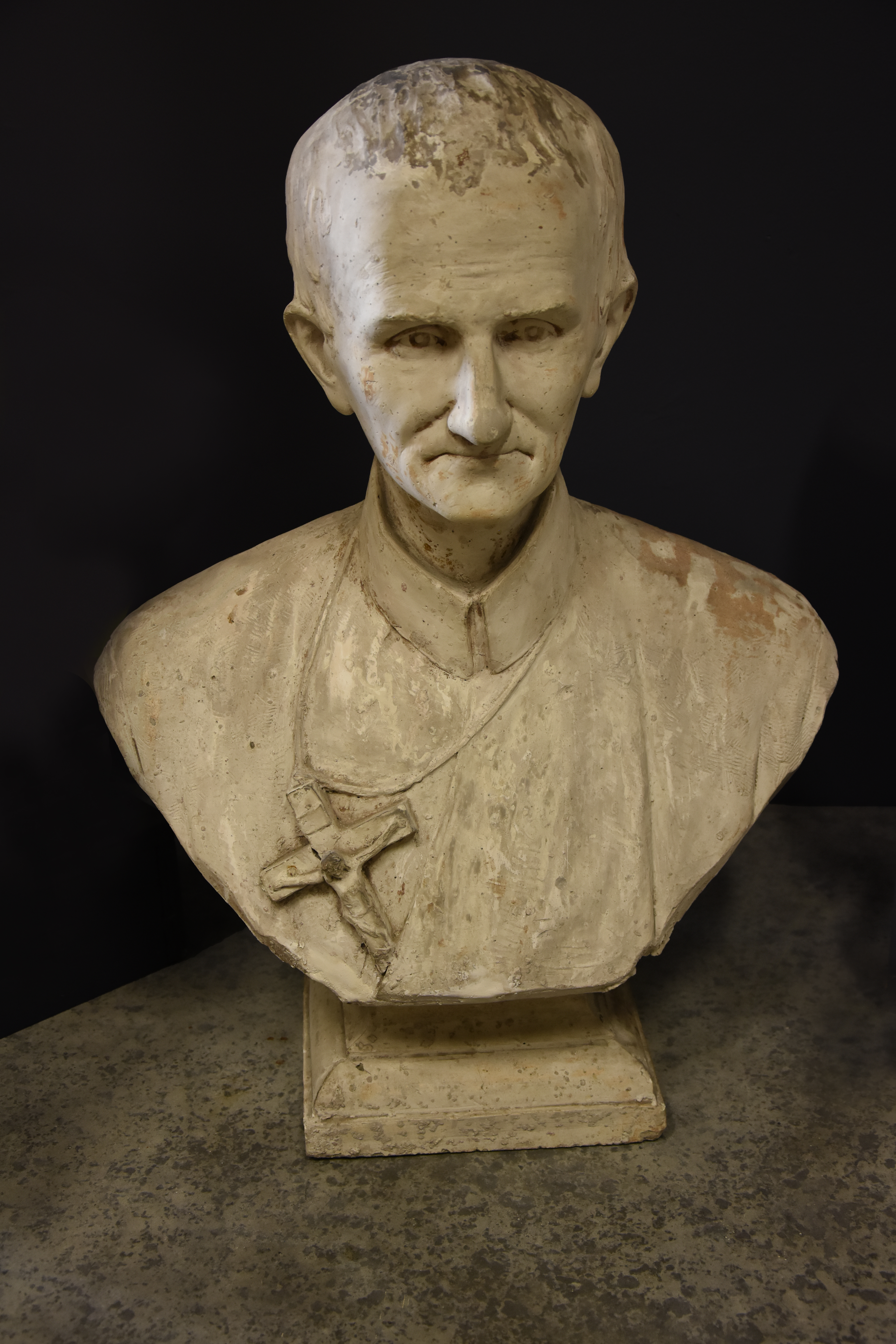
Bust in Melle, Belgium

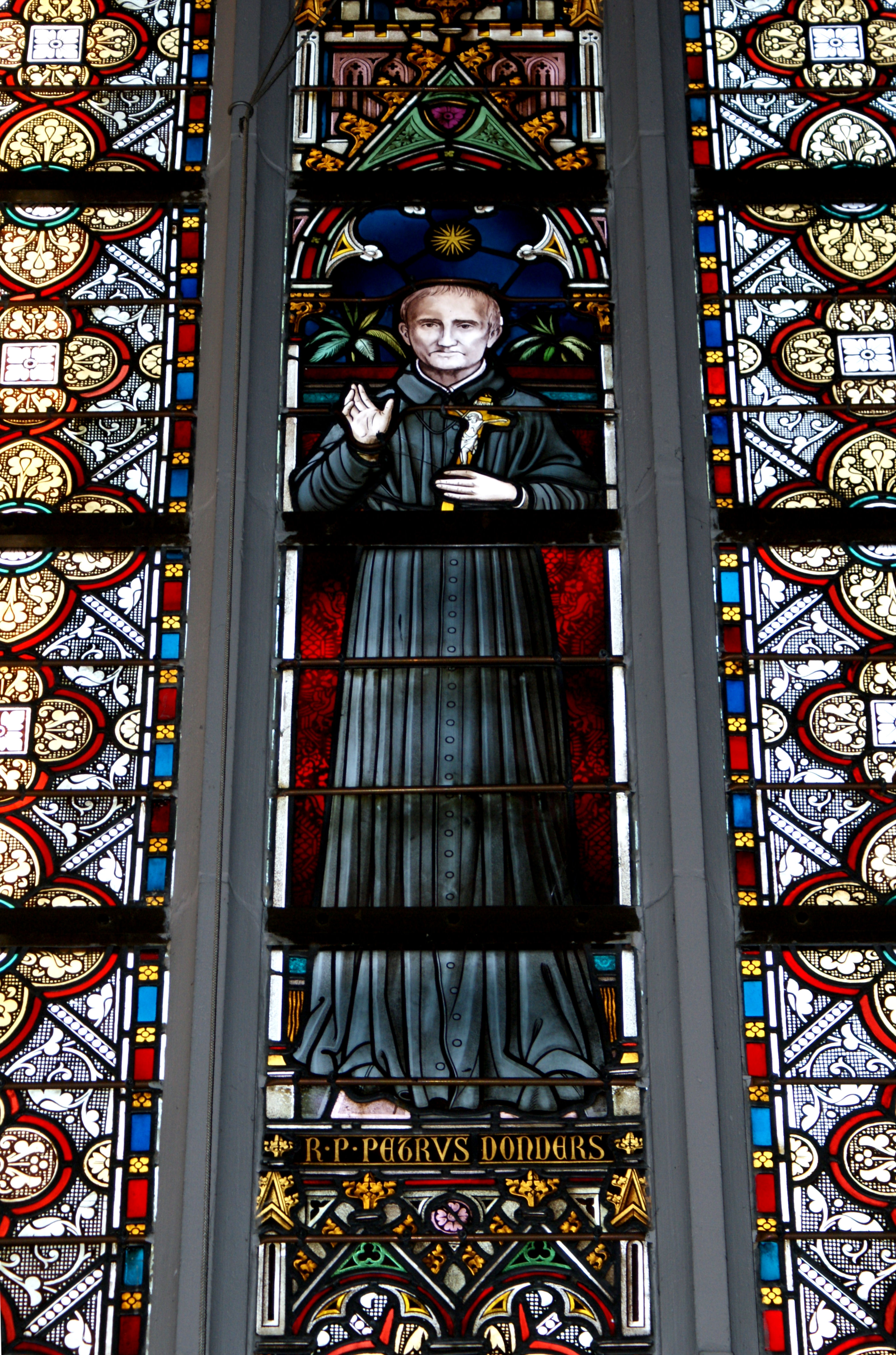
Stained glass window

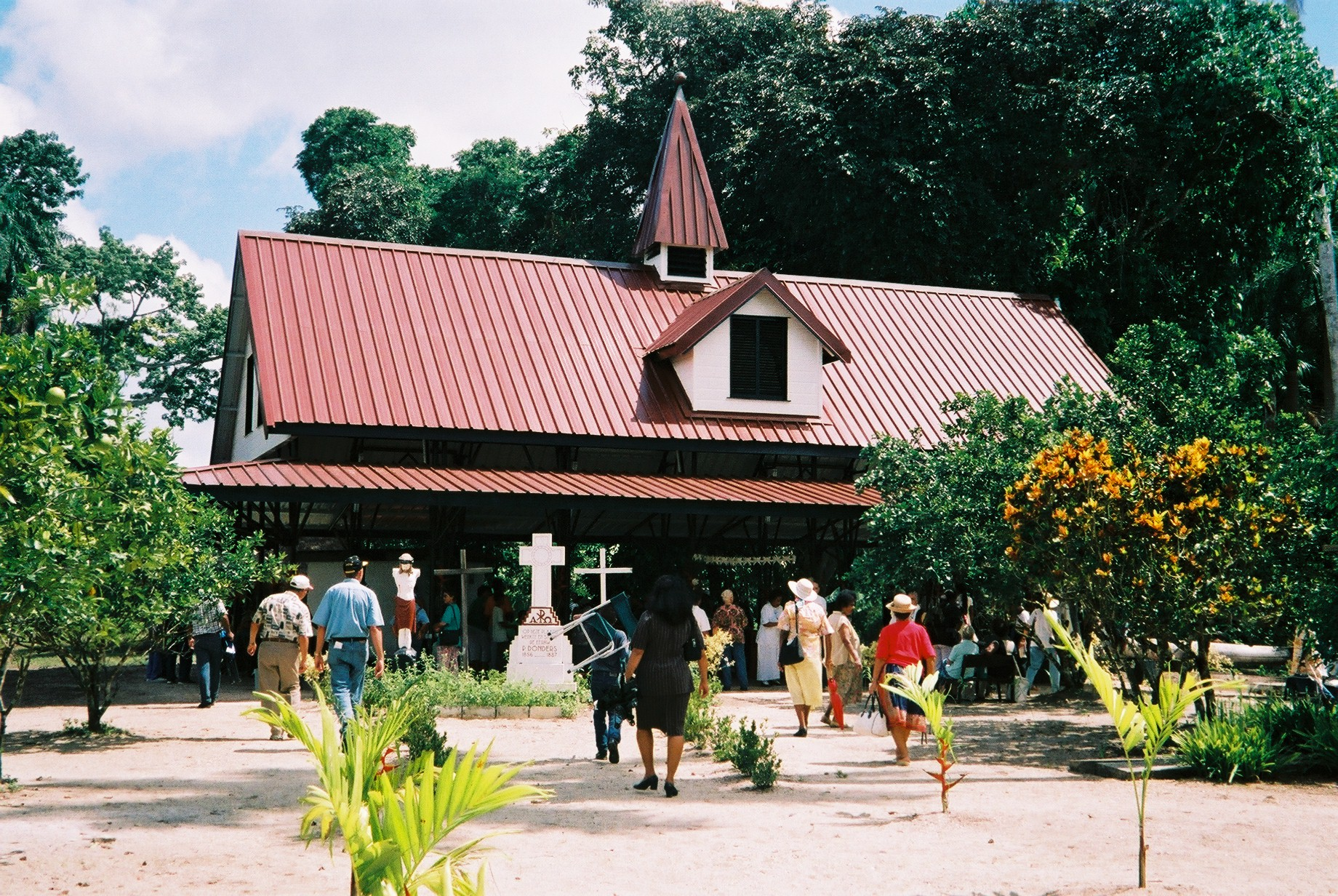
Pilgrimage site Batavia, Suriname

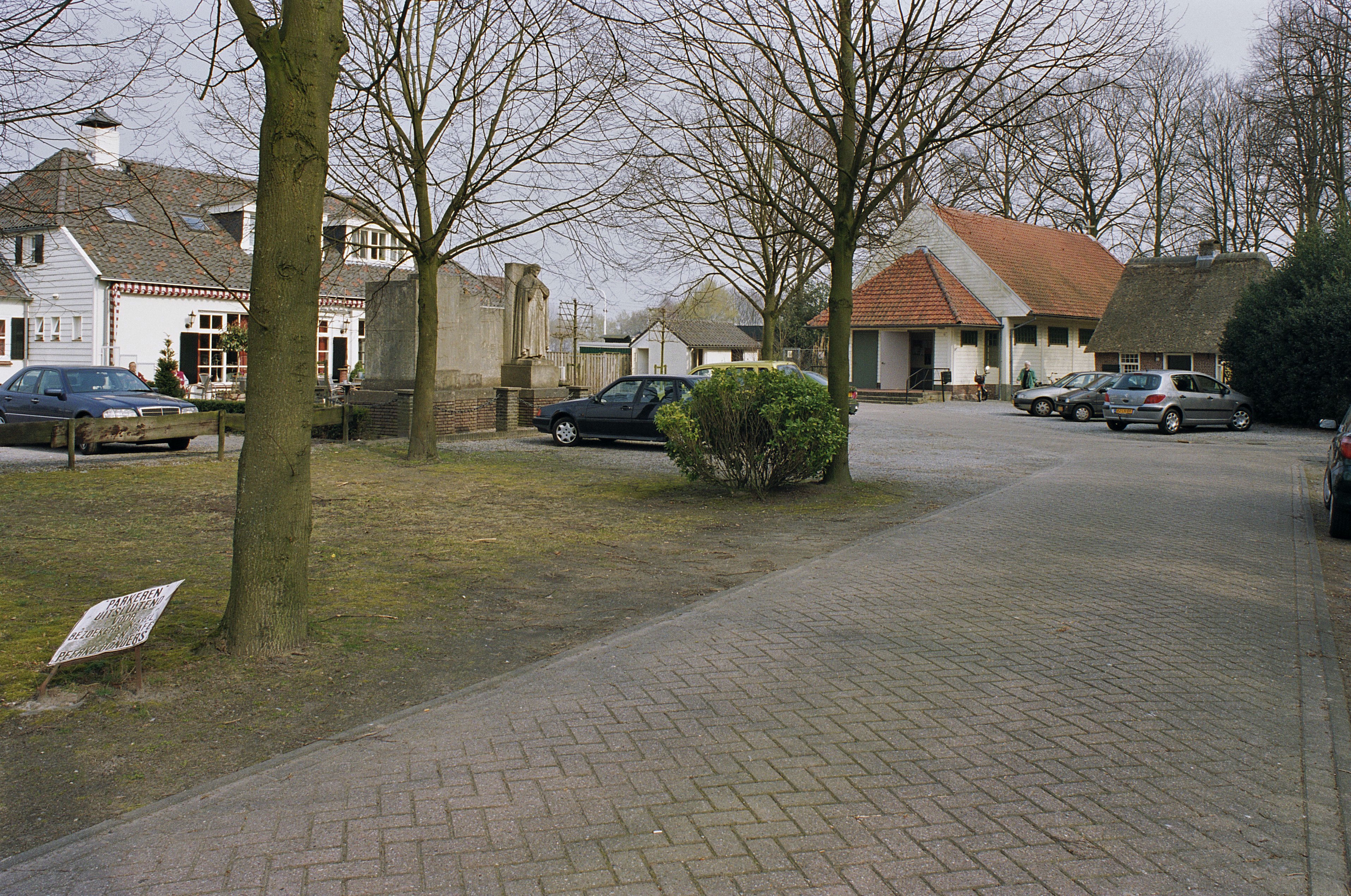
Pilgrimage site Tilburg, the Netherlands

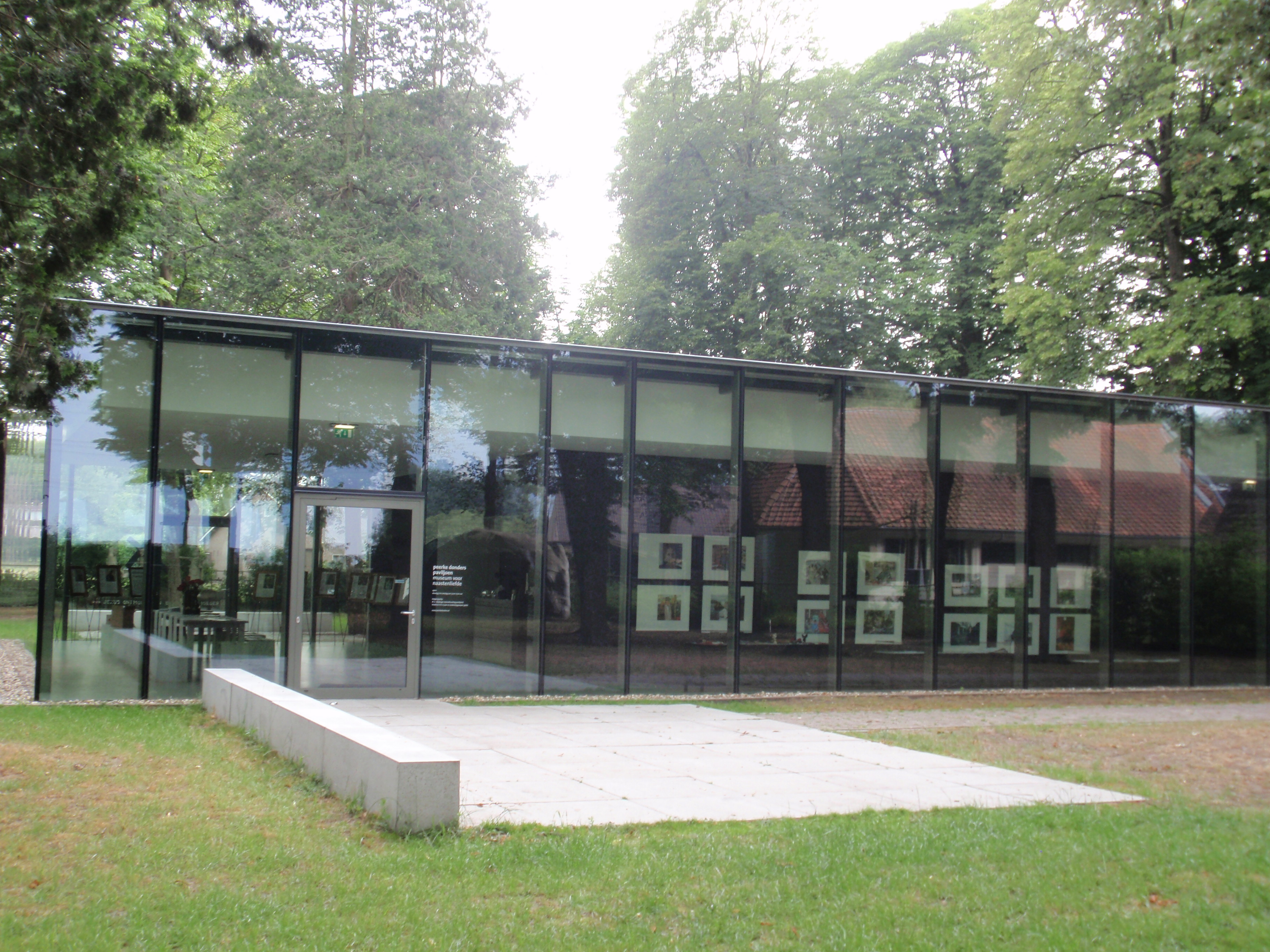
Museum of Charity, Tilburg

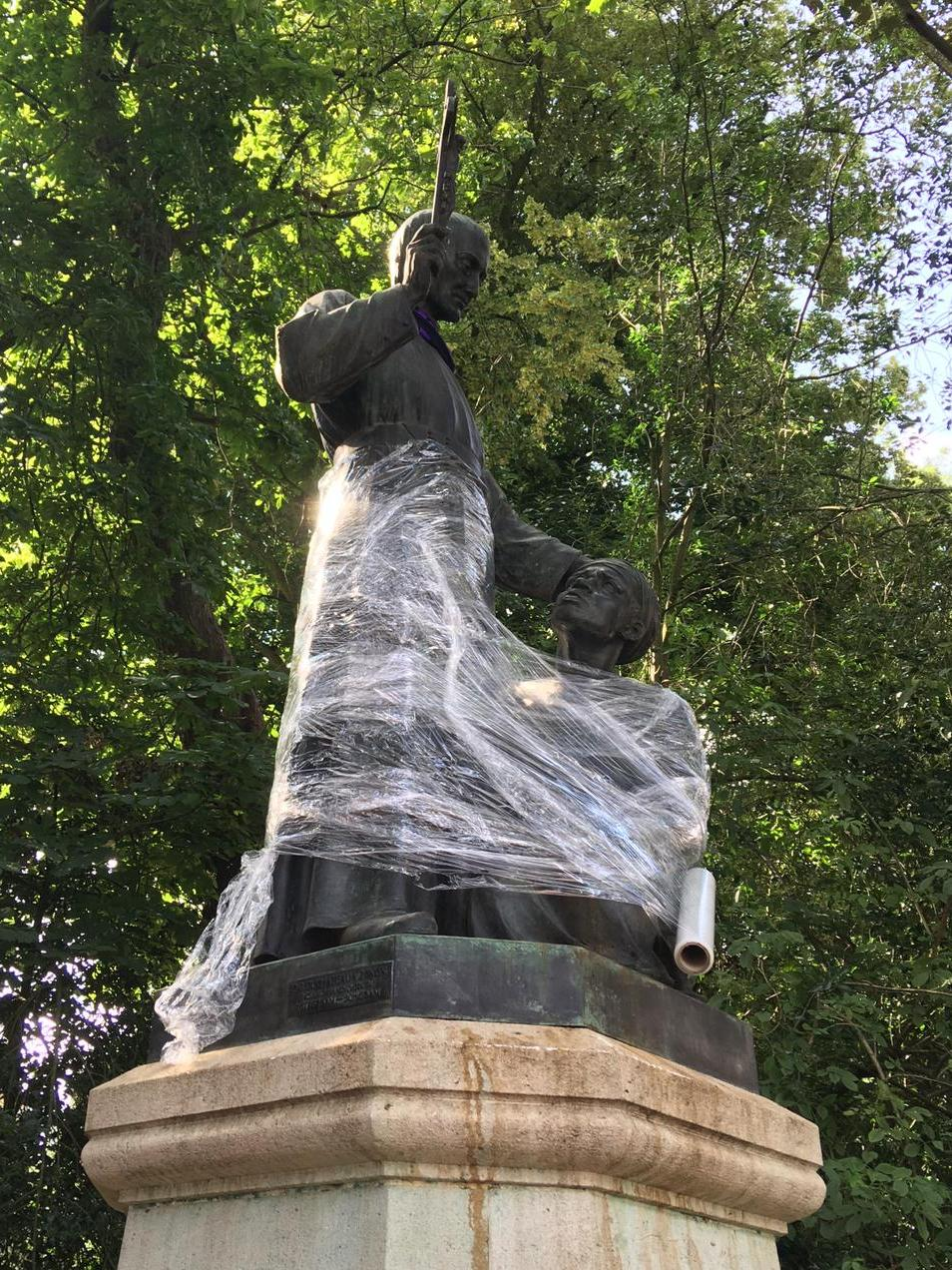
Statue protested in 2020

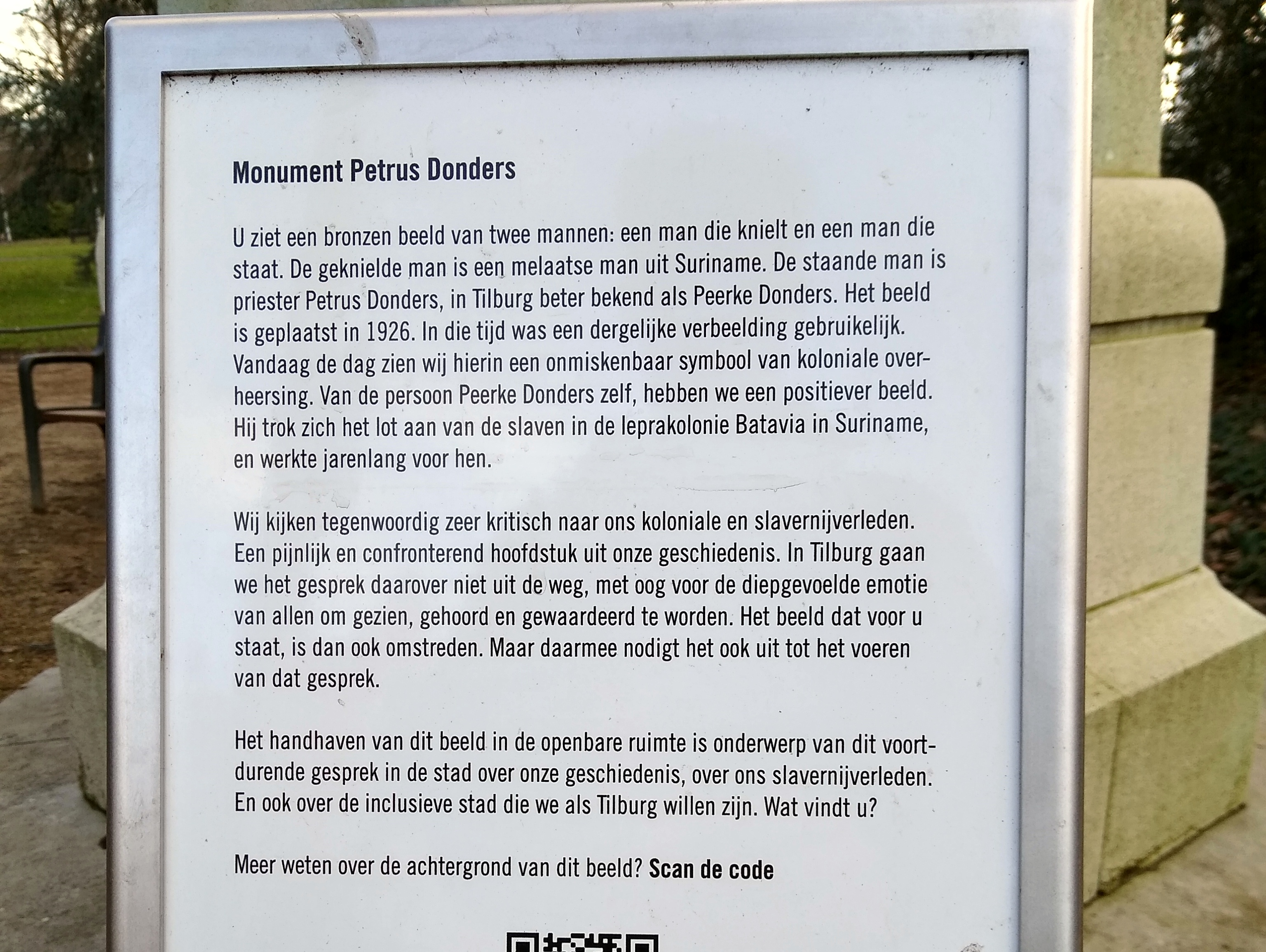
Explanatory sign (in Dutch), 2022

== See also ==
- Catholic Church in Suriname
- Father Damien
