= Santa Rosa Church =

Santa Rose Church may refer to:

- Santa Rosa Church, Florence, a church in Florence, Italy
- Santa Rosa Church, Paramaribo, a church in Paramaribo, Suriname
