= Santa Rosa Church, Paramaribo =

Santa Rosa Church
- Sint Rosakerk
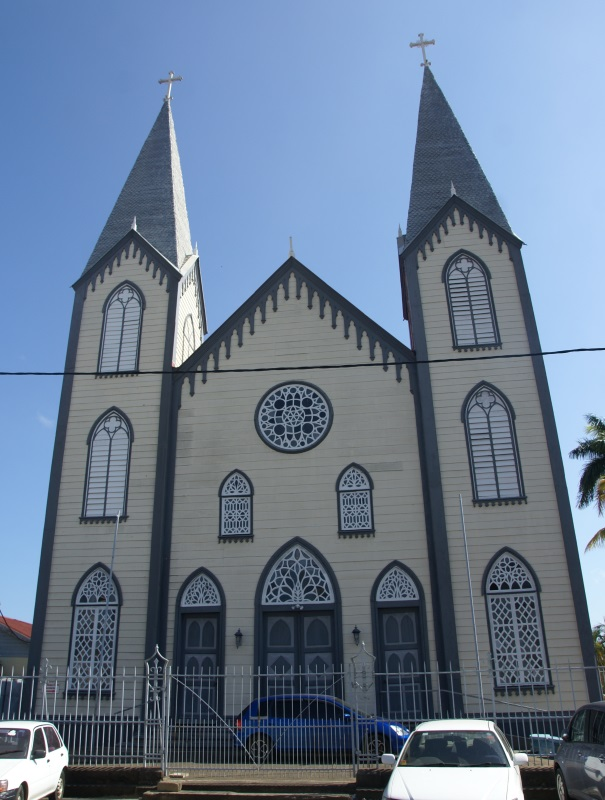
- Santa Rosa Church
- 5.82247°N 55.16353°W
- Location: Paramaribo
- Country: Suriname
- Denomination: Roman Catholic Church

History
- Dedication: Rose of Lima
- Consecrated: 28 June 1911

Specifications
- Capacity: c. 300
- Materials: Wood

Administration
- Diocese: Diocese of Paramaribo

The Santa Rosa Church (Dutch: Sint Rosakerk) is a Roman Catholic church located in Paramaribo, Suriname. The current church dates from 1911, and is the second largest church in Paramaribo. It is located in the centre of the city and part of the UNESCO World Heritage Site.

== History ==
In the middle of the 19th century there was a large increase in the number of Catholics in Suriname. In 1861, the building of Loge Concordia of the freemasons was purchased, and turned into a church. The church was dedicated to Rose of Lima.

In 1911, a larger church was built with two towers, and consecrated on 28 June 1911. It is a deep church with a small square in front. The building consists of a high central nave with a flat ceiling, and two side naves, and is painted in the same colour scheme as the Saint Peter and Paul Cathedral.

The organ of the Rosa Church was built by Jos H. Vermeulen and dates from 1929. There are two bells in the left tower. In 1946, the Rosa Church was hit by lightning which caused a hole of several metres in the tower. In 2009, the Mary statue of the clergy house of the Anthony the Great Church in The Hague was donated to the Rosa Church and placed in an artificial cave in front of the church.

In 2020, a restoration of the Rosa Church started, because the building suffered from leakage and barklice. In May 2021, during the restoration, both towers were struck by lightning and damaged.

The clergy house is in use by the boy scouts, and the church is also used as a concert hall.

== Gallery ==
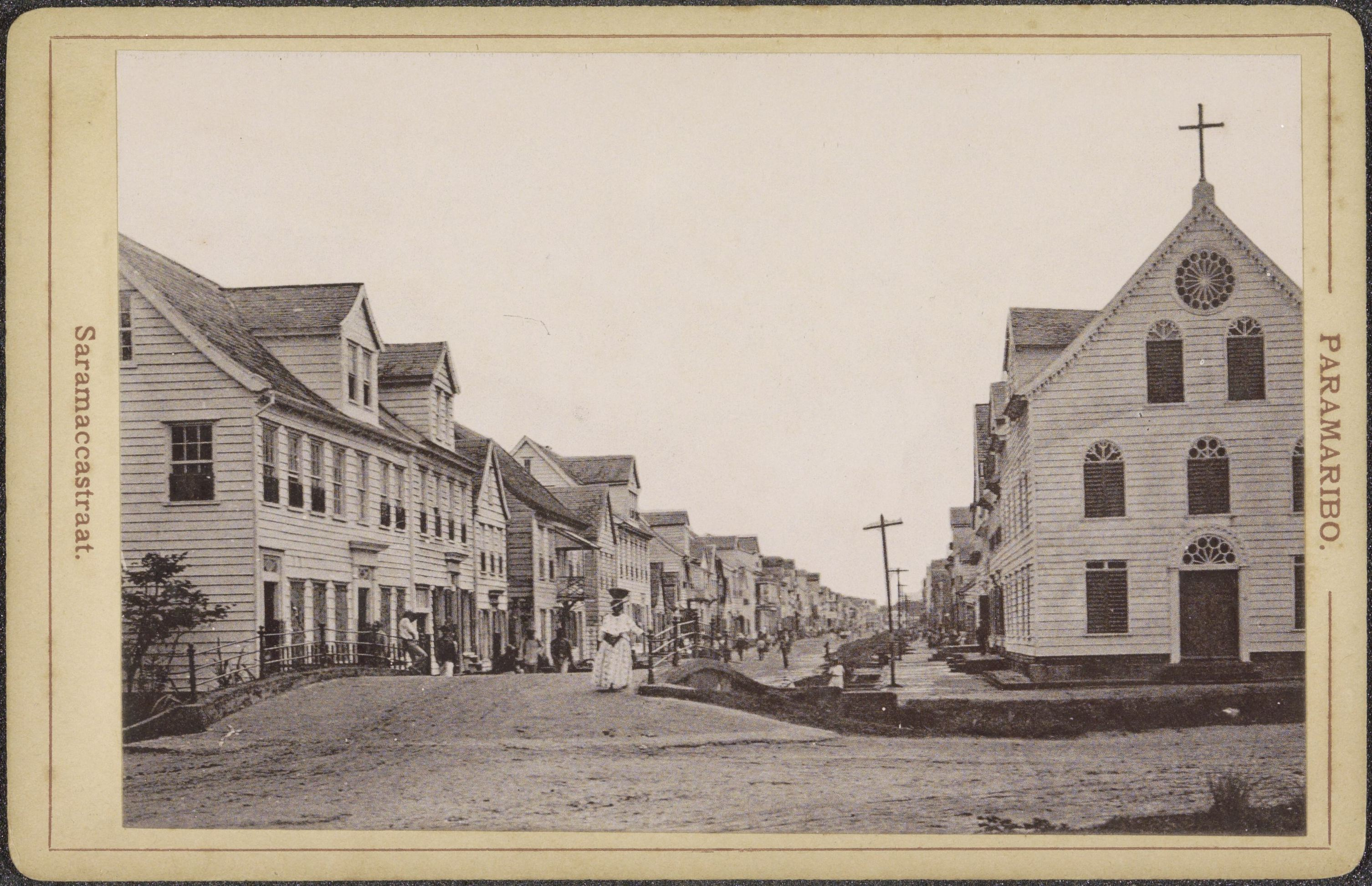
1861 church

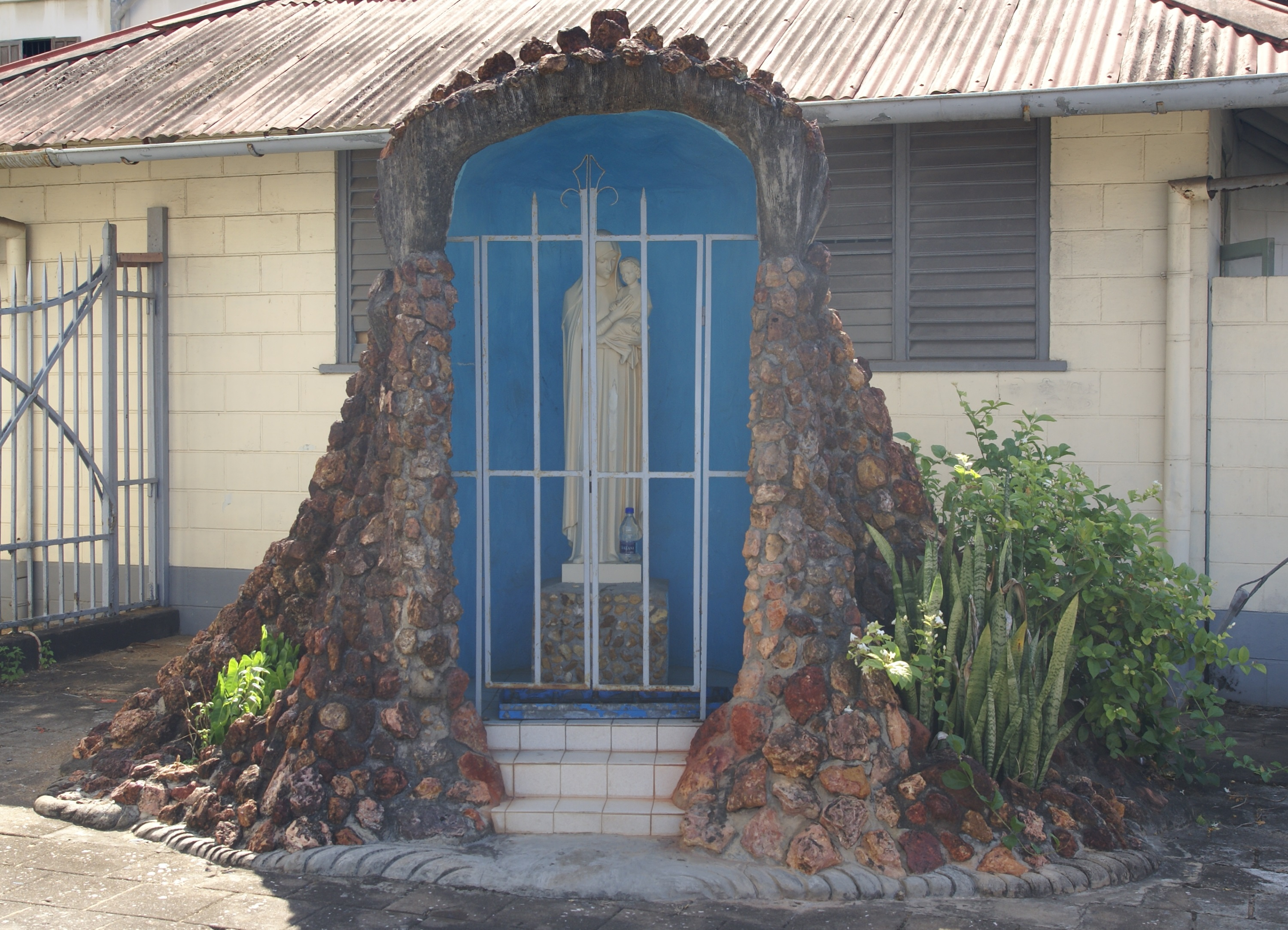
Mary statue in the cave

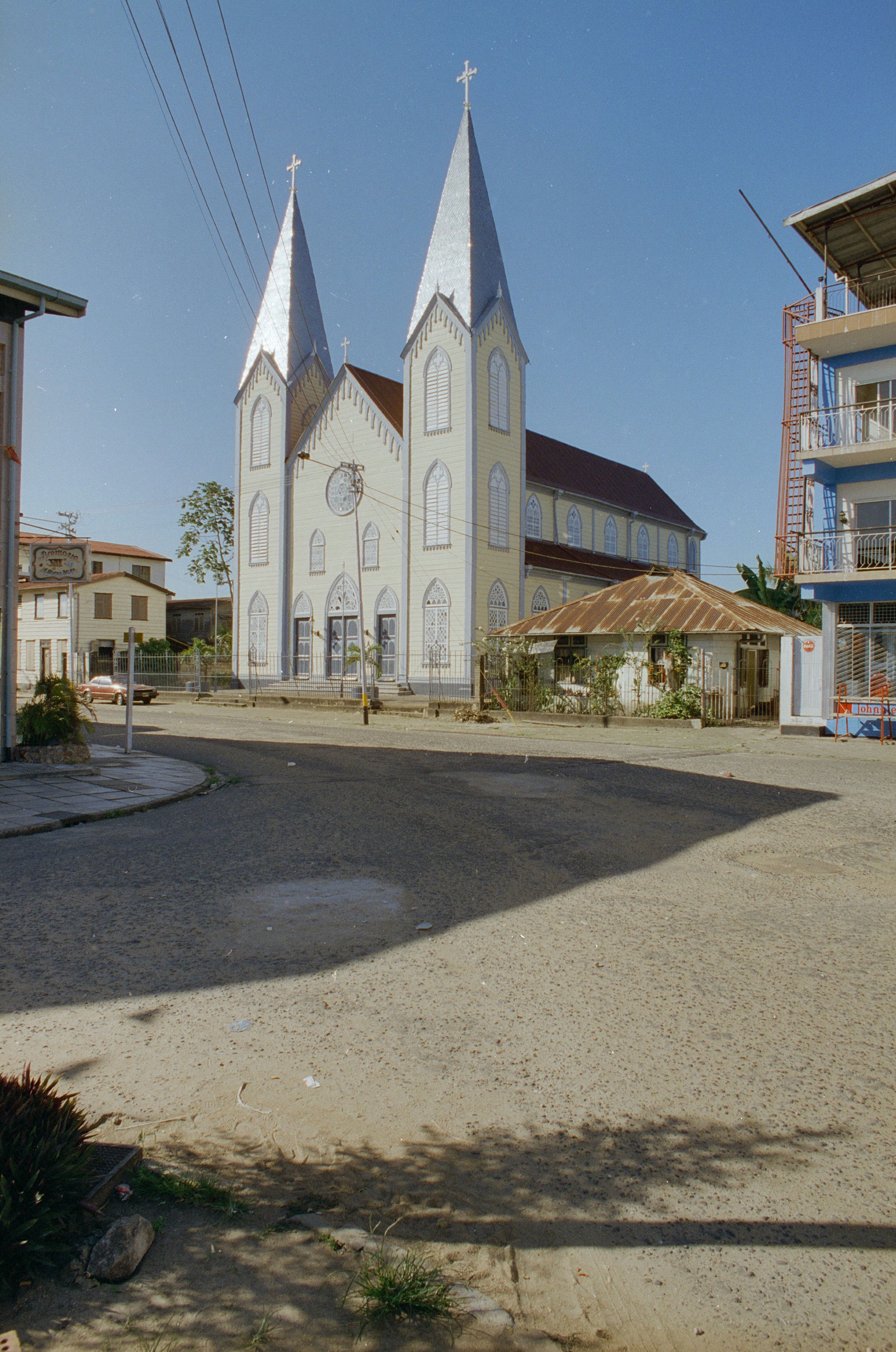
West wing

== See also ==
- Roman Catholicism in Suriname
