= Catholic Church in Suriname =

The Catholic Church in Suriname is part of the worldwide Catholic Church, under the spiritual leadership of the pope in Rome.

There are 117,261 Catholics in Suriname, 21.6% of the population, far lower than most of South America. The Church in Suriname consists of only one diocese, the Diocese of Paramaribo. There are 22 priests in the Diocese, with a ratio of about 5,030 Catholics per priest. There are 31 Catholic parishes in the diocese. The seat of the Diocese of Paramaribo is The Cathedral of Sts. Peter and Paul in Paramaribo. The current bishop of Paramaribo is Karel Choennie.

== History ==
The first missionaries to come to Suriname were the Franciscans in 1683, but the harshness of the climate did not favor the arrival of other priests, so that up to 1786 the country was totally abandoned by the Catholic missions. Since 1786 some secular priests opened a missionary center, but soon had to flee to the opposition of the ministers of other Christian denominations. When in 1816 the territory passed into the hands of the Dutch, was guaranteed freedom of worship. This was the real starting point of Catholic evangelization of what today is called Suriname. In 1817 was erected the Apostolic Prefecture of Dutch Guyana, which became apostolic vicariate in 1842 and the mission was entrusted in a special way to the Redemptorists. On 7 May 1958 the apostolic vicariate was elevated to the rank of diocese, then Diocese of Paramaribo.

== Ecclesiastical Organization ==
Today in the country there is only one Catholic ecclesiastical district, the Diocese of Paramaribo, suffragan of the Archdiocese of Port of Spain in Trinidad and Tobago.

The local episcopate is Antilles Episcopal Conference's officio member.

== Apostolic Nunciature ==
The Apostolic Nunciature of Suriname was established on 16 February 1994.

=== Nuncios ===
- Eugenio Sbarbaro (July 13, 1994 - April 26, 2000 appointed apostolic nuncio in Serbia and Montenegro)
- Emil Paul Tscherrig (January 20, 2001 - May 22, 2004 appointed apostolic nuncio in Korea)
- Thomas Edward Gullickson (December 15, 2004 - May 21, 2011 appointed apostolic nuncio in Ukraine)
- Nicola Girasoli (29 October 2011 - 16 June 2017, appointed Apostolic Nuncio to Peru)
- Fortunatus Nwachukwu (9 Mar 2018 - 17 Dec 2021, appointed, Permanent Observer to United Nations Office and Specialized Agencies in Geneva)
- Santiago De Wit Guzmán, from 30 Jul 2022 -

== See also ==
- Religion in Suriname
- Pan-Amazonian Ecclesial Network (REPAM)
