= Aloysius Ferdinandus Zichem =

Surinamese bishop (1933–2016)

Aloysius Ferdinandus Zichem C.Ss.R.
- Bishop of Paramaribo
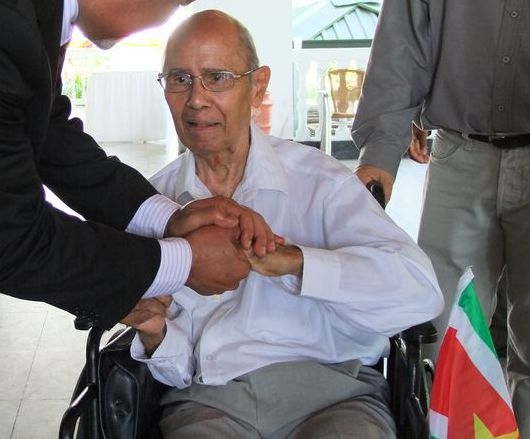
- Zichem in November 2010
- Church: Catholic Church
- Diocese: Diocese of Paramaribo
- In office: 30 August 1971 – 9 August 2003
- Predecessor: Stephanus Kuijpers
- Successor: Wilhelmus de Bekker
- Previous posts: Titular Bishop of Fuerteventura (1969-1971); Auxiliary Bishop of Paramaribo (1969-1971)

Orders
- Ordination: 14 August 1960
- Consecration: 8 February 1970 by Stephanus Kuijpers

Personal details
- Born: 28 February 1933 Paramaribo, Colony of Surinam, Kingdom of the Netherlands
- Died: 13 November 2016 (aged 83) Paramaribo, Paramaribo District, Suriname

Aloysius Ferdinandus Zichem, C.Ss.R., (Paramaribo February 28, 1933 – Paramaribo November 13, 2016) was a Roman Catholic bishop. He was a member of the Congregation of the Most Holy Redeemer, more commonly known as the Redemptorists.

Ordained to the priesthood in 1960, Zichem served as auxiliary bishop of the Roman Catholic Diocese of Paramaribo, Suriname, from 1969 to 1971. He then served as bishop of the diocese from 1971 to 2003.
