= Karel Choennie =

Surinamese Roman Catholic bishop

The Most Reverend Lord Karel Choennie
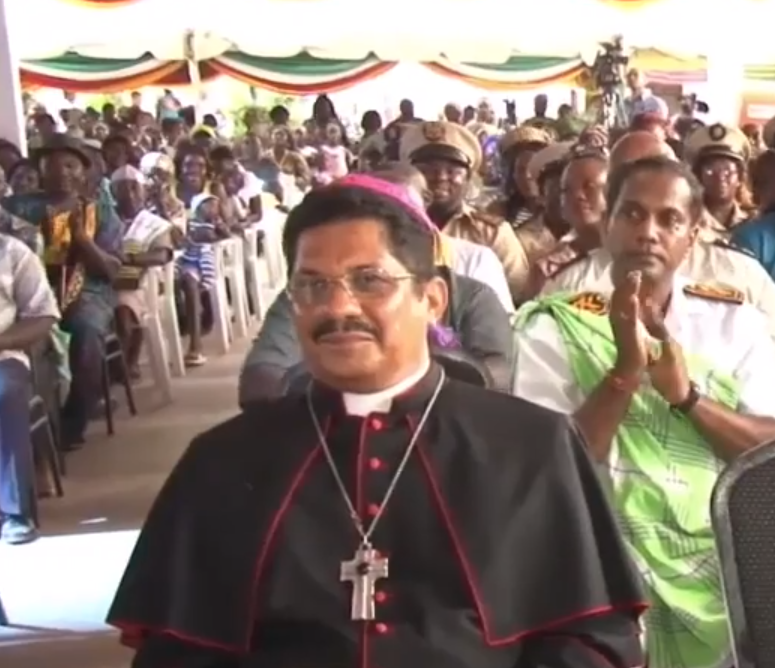
- Choennie (2018)
- Church: Saint Peter and Paul Cathedral
- Archdiocese: Port of Spain
- Diocese: Paramaribo
- Appointed: 11 November 2015
- Predecessor: Wilhelmus de Bekker

Orders
- Ordination: 3 August 1985
- Consecration: 24 January 2016 by Wilhelmus de Bekker

Personal details
- Born: Karel Martinus Choennie; 20 December 1958 (age 67) Surinam
- Denomination: Roman Catholic
- Motto: Diliges dominum et proximum
- Coat of arms

Karel Martinus Choennie (born 20 December 1958) is a Surinamese Roman Catholic bishop. As of 2016, he is the current Bishop of Paramaribo. He is the first bishop in Suriname of Indian descent.

== Biography ==
Choennie was born on 20 December 1958. In 1976, he left for the Netherlands to study pedagogy at Radboud University Nijmegen, and obtained his bachelor's degree in 1978. Next, he went to the monastery of Mount Saint Benedict in Trinidad and Tobago, and graduated in theology at the University of the West Indies in 1984. On 3 August 1985, he was ordained priest. In 1996, he studied pastoral theology at KU Leuven, and graduated in 1998.

On 11 November 2015, Choennie was appointed Bishop of Paramaribo, and consecrated on 24 January 2016 by Wilhelmus de Bekker.

== Positions ==
During the military dictatorship, Choennie was a vocal critic of the human rights violations which had occurred. When he criticized the amnesty for December Murders, he was labelled enemy of the people by President Desi Bouterse.

In 2019, Choennie was one of the bishops who voted for the inclusion of married and female priests during the Amazon synod. Pope Francis later rejected the conclusions of the synod.

Choennie has expressed his concerns about climate change, and called for a radical change in the production and consumption culture.

Catholic Church titles
| Preceded by Wilhelmus de Bekker | Bishop of Paramaribo; 24 January 2016 | Succeeded by incumbent |
