= Wilhelmus de Bekker =

Dutch-born Surinamese Roman Catholic bishop (1940–2026)

The Most Reverend Wilhelmus de Bekker
- Bishop Emeritus of Paramaribo
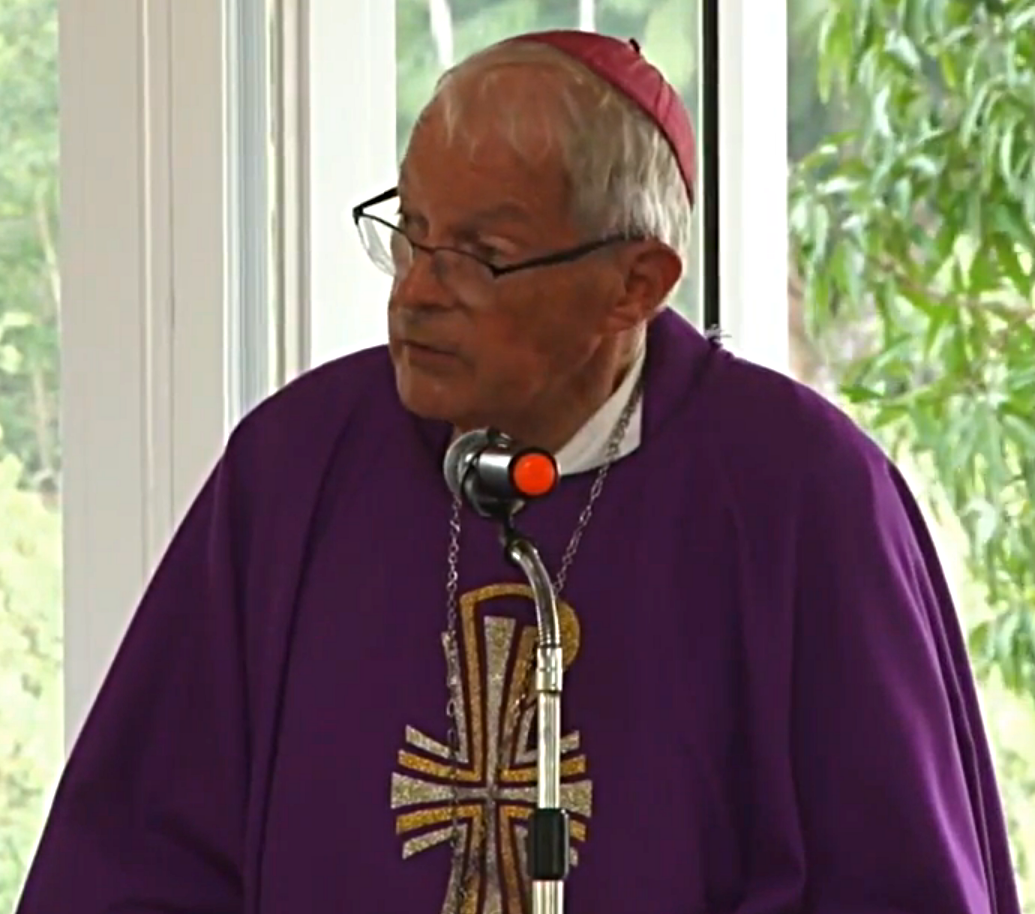
- Church: Roman Catholic Church
- Archdiocese: Port of Spain
- Diocese: Paramaribo
- Installed: 12 November 2004
- Term ended: 31 May 2014
- Predecessor: Aloysius Ferdinandus Zichem
- Successor: Karel Choennie
- Previous post: Diocesan Administrator of Paramaribo (2003–2004)

Orders
- Ordination: 25 May 1985 by Aloysius Ferdinandus Zichem
- Consecration: 30 January 2005 by Ad van Luyn, Edward Joseph Gilbert and Lawrence Aloysius Burke

Personal details
- Born: Wilhelmus Adrianus Josephus Maria de Bekker; 27 April 1939 Helmond, Netherlands
- Died: 3 June 2026 (aged 87) Paramaribo, Suriname
- Education: Catholic University of Nijmegen
- Motto: Testimonium Domini Fidele

Wilhelmus Adrianus Josephus Maria de Bekker (27 April 1939 – 3 June 2026) was a Dutch-born Surinamese Roman Catholic prelate who served as the Bishop of the Diocese of Paramaribo in Suriname from 2004 until his retirement in 2014.

== Biography ==
Wilhelmus de Bekker was born on 27 April 1939 in Helmond, the Netherlands. He pursued his higher education at the Catholic University of Nijmegen, where he obtained a licentiate degree in cultural and social anthropology. Later he worked for years for the Roman Catholic Special Education as a consultant inspector and as director of the Father Ahlbrink Foundation. Following the completion of his studies, he was ordained a priest for the Diocese of Paramaribo on 25 May 1985 by Bishop Aloysius Ferdinandus Zichem. He subsequently engaged in pastoral work within Suriname, eventually serving as the vicar general of the diocese.

Following the resignation of Bishop Aloysius Ferdinandus Zichem, Pope John Paul II appointed De Bekker as the Bishop of Paramaribo on 12 November 2004. He was consecrated as a bishop on 30 January 2005 by Bishop of Rotterdam Ad van Luyn, with Archbishops Edward Joseph Gilbert and Lawrence Aloysius Burke as co-consecrators. De Bekker became the first non-Surinamese bishop of the diocese since its elevation from a vicariate apostolic.

On 31 May 2014, having reached the age limit prescribed by canon law, Pope Francis accepted De Bekker's resignation. He was succeeded by Karel Choennie in 2015, remaining in Suriname as bishop emeritus.

De Bekker died in Paramaribo on 3 June 2026, at the age of 87.

Catholic Church titles
Preceded by Aloysius Ferdinandus Zichem	Bishop of Paramaribo; 2004–2014	Succeeded by Karel Choennie
