= Batavia, Suriname =

Town in Saramacca District, Suriname

Batavia
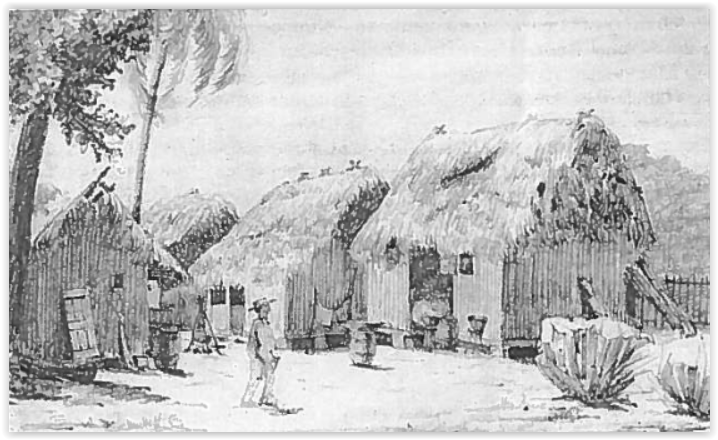
- Batavia in 1879, by Arnoldus Borret (1848-1888). The man with a hat is the doctor.

- Location in Suriname
- Coordinates: 5°42′41″N 55°52′37″W
- Country: Suriname
- District: Saramacca District
- Resort (municipality): Calcutta

Batavia on the Coppename River in Suriname is a former cocoa plantation, military post and state leper colony of the Dutch colonists. Batavia functioned as a leper colony from 1824 to 1897, after which the location was completely abandoned. Since 2001 it has been redeveloped as a place of pilgrimage and tourism.

== Overview ==
In 1790, an area of uncultivated land near the Saramacca River known as Voorzorg, was designated to treat leprosy. In due time plantations started to sprawl around the place, and in 1824 the lepers were moved to the further afield Coppename location, an abandoned plantation. Batavia was also an important military post that was part of the 'Orange Road', a defensive line to prevent attacks on plantations by groups of former slaves operating from the interior. This military post remained in place.

It was not until 1786 that Catholic priests were sent from the Netherlands to the colony of Suriname, but they were not welcome on the plantations. Protestant missionaries were not welcome either, although protestantism was the state religion at the time. After sporadic initial visits by priests to Batavia, the leper colony was allowed to have a permanent Roman Catholic mission post in 1836. It was led by apostolic prefect Jacobus Grooff, followed by several others, including Peter Donders. In 1865, the Suriname mission was assigned to the (Dutch) redemptorists. One of their rules is "They shall work among the most abandoned." In general the priests showed little respect for African cultural and religious practices, such as winti. This led to major tensions on several occasions. One priest was poisoned in 1849.

Peter Donders joined the redemptorists in 1866 after which he made several missionary journeys to the indigenous and marroon people in the interior. He was called back to the capital by apostolic vicar Johannes Schaap in 1882. Donders then worked for several years at the cotton plantation Mary's Hope in the Coronie District, but Schaap send him to Batavia again in 1885. Here he contracted a kidney infection from which he died on 14 january 1887. Peter Donders was beatified by Pope John Paul II in 1982.

In 1826, Batavia had about 300 lepers. In 1853 there were 453 of them. At the time of Dutch abolition of slavery in 1863 the number of infected was 380, including eleven already freed. The 369 leprosy-infected former enslaved were given (colonial) surnames at that moment. The former owners were not compensated financially by the state. Despite the abolition of slavery, the management at Batavia continued to make distinctions in the rationing of lepers, to be precise between the blacks and the asians ('contractwerkers'). The number of lepers on Batavia soon decreased. The government had less control over the population and many infected people hid in Paramaribo and surrounding area. In 1875 there were 125 lepers and 45 others. In 1880, only 101 lepers and 76 others. The residents were not afraid of contamination and cared for one another. Relationships existed between the healthy and the infected and children were born.

Batavia was closed in 1897, and the remaining 81 lepers were moved to the former sugar plantation Groot Chatillon on the Suriname River, a new state leper colony near the capital. Batavia was burned to the ground to prevent a future outbreak of leprosy In 2000 plans were made to restore the colony. The reconstruction reopened on 14 January 2017, and Batavia is nowadays a tourist attraction and a pilgrimage site.

== See also ==
- Bethesda, Suriname
