= Santa Rosa Church, Florence =

Sanctuary church located in Florence, Italy

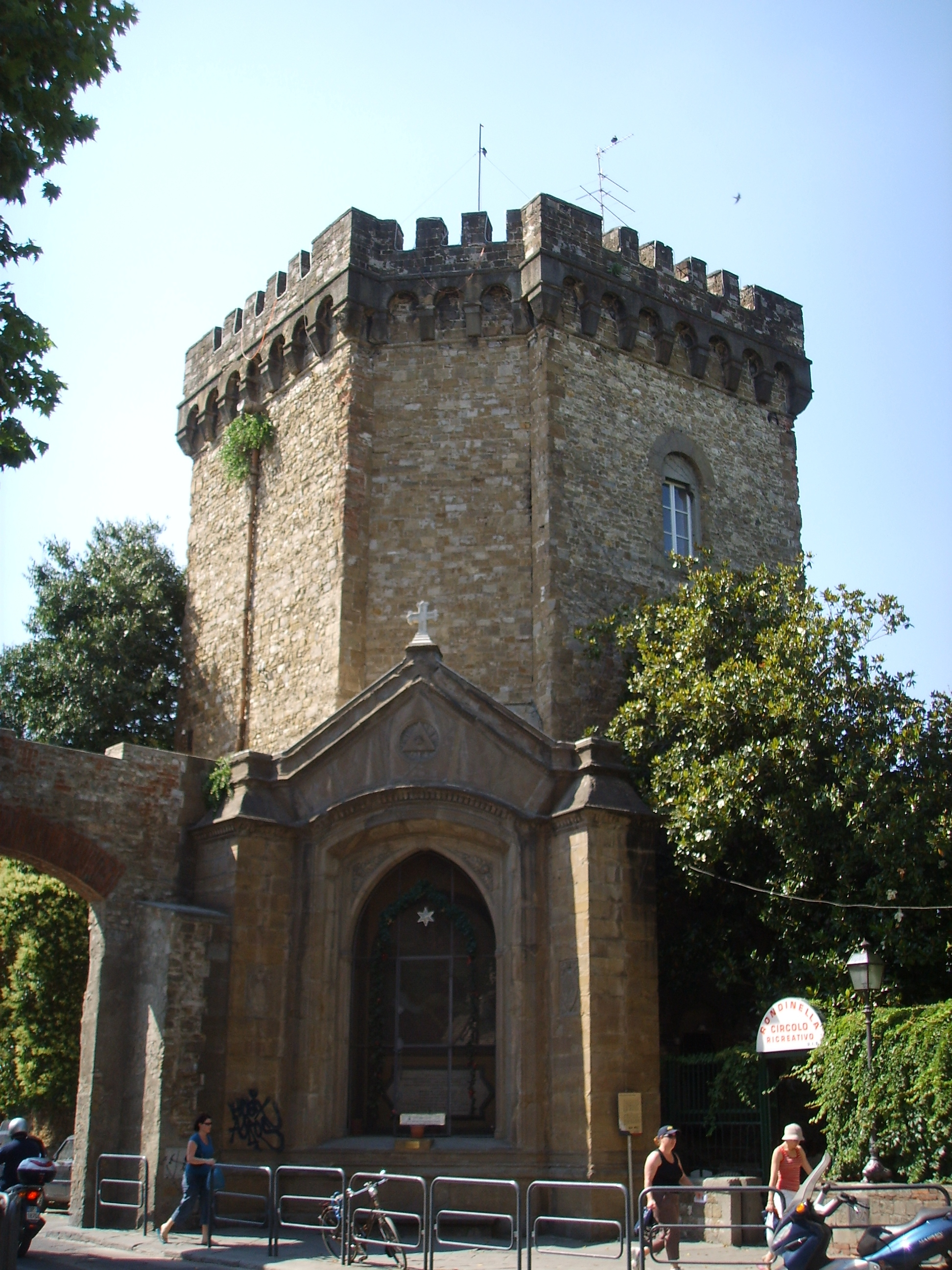
Tabernacolo di Santa Rosa

Santa Rosa Church is a sanctuary church located in Florence in the region of Tuscany, Italy.
