= Diocese of Paramaribo =

Roman Catholic diocese in Suriname

Diocese of Paramaribo Dioecesis Paramariboënsis Bisdom Paramaribo

Catholic
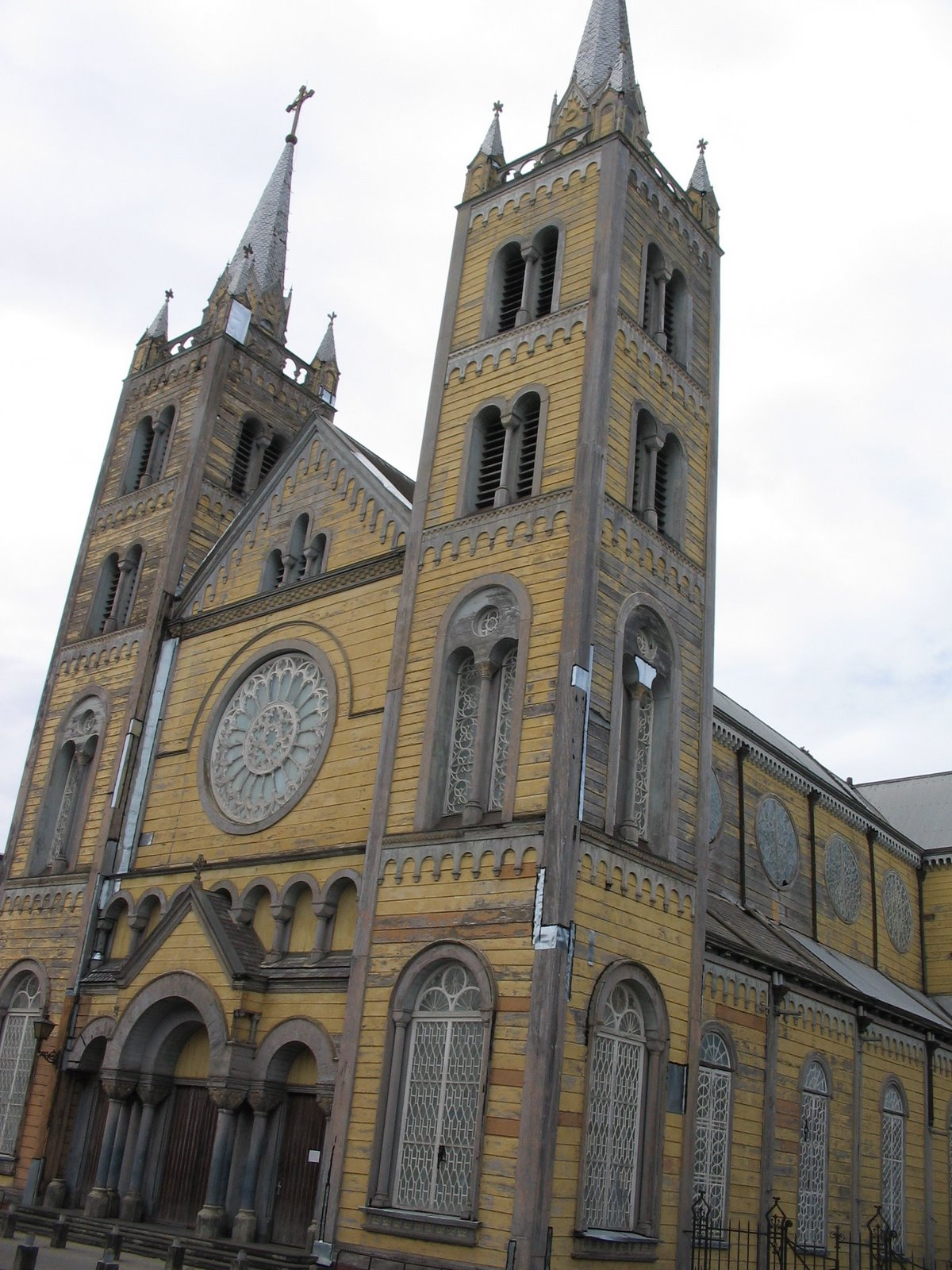
- Cathedral of Sts. Peter and Paul

Location
- Country: Suriname
- Ecclesiastical province: Port of Spain
- Metropolitan: Port of Spain

Statistics
- Area: 163,265 km^{2} (63,037 sq mi)
- Population: Total; Catholics: (as of 2013); 557,000; 135,000 (24,2%)

Information
- Denomination: Roman Catholic
- Rite: Latin Rite
- Established: 22 November 1817 (208 years ago)
- Cathedral: Cathedral Basilica of St. Peter and St. Paul

Current leadership
- Pope: Leo XIV
- Bishop: Karel Choennie
- Metropolitan Archbishop: Joseph Everard Harris

Website
- Website of the Diocese

The Roman Catholic Diocese of Paramaribo (Latin: Dioecesis Paramariboënsis; Dutch: Bisdom Paramaribo) (erected 22 November 1817, as the Prefecture Apostolic of Dutch Guyana-Suriname) is a suffragan of the Archdiocese of Port of Spain. It was elevated to an apostolic vicariate on 12 September 1842 and to the Diocese of Paramaribo on 7 May 1958.

== Bishops ==
=== Ordinaries ===
- Paulus Antonius Wennekers (1817-1823)
- Martinus van der Weijden (1825–1826)
- Jacobus Grooff (1826–1852), also appointed Vicar Apostolic of Batavia, Dutch East Indies
- Jacobus Gerardus Schepers (1842–1863)
- Johannes Baptista Swinkels, C.SS.R. (1865–1875)
- Johannes Henricus Schaap, C.SS.R. (1876–1889)
- Wilhelmus Antonius Ferdinand Wulfingh, C.SS.R. (1889–1906)
- Jacobus Cornelis Meeuwissen, C.SS.R. (1907–1911)
- Theodorus Antonius Leonardus Maria van Roosmalen, C.SS.R. (1911–1947)
- Stephanus Joseph Maria Magdalena Kuijpers, C.SS.R. (1946–1971)
- Aloysius Ferdinandus Zichem, C.SS.R. (1971–2003)
- Wilhelmus Adrianus Josephus Maria de Bekker (2004–2014)
- Karel Choennie (2015 – )

=== Auxiliary bishop ===
- Aloysius Ferdinandus Zichem, C.SS.R. (1969-1971), appointed Bishop here

== External links and references ==
- Diocese of Paramaribo – Suriname official site
- "Diocese of Paramaribo". Catholic-Hierarchy. Archived from the original on 2005-04-14.
- http://catholic-hierarchy.org/diocese/dpara.html
