= Saint Peter and Paul Cathedral, Paramaribo =

Roman Catholic cathedral in Paramaribo, Suriname

Coordinates: 5°49′43.2″N 55°09′14.6″W

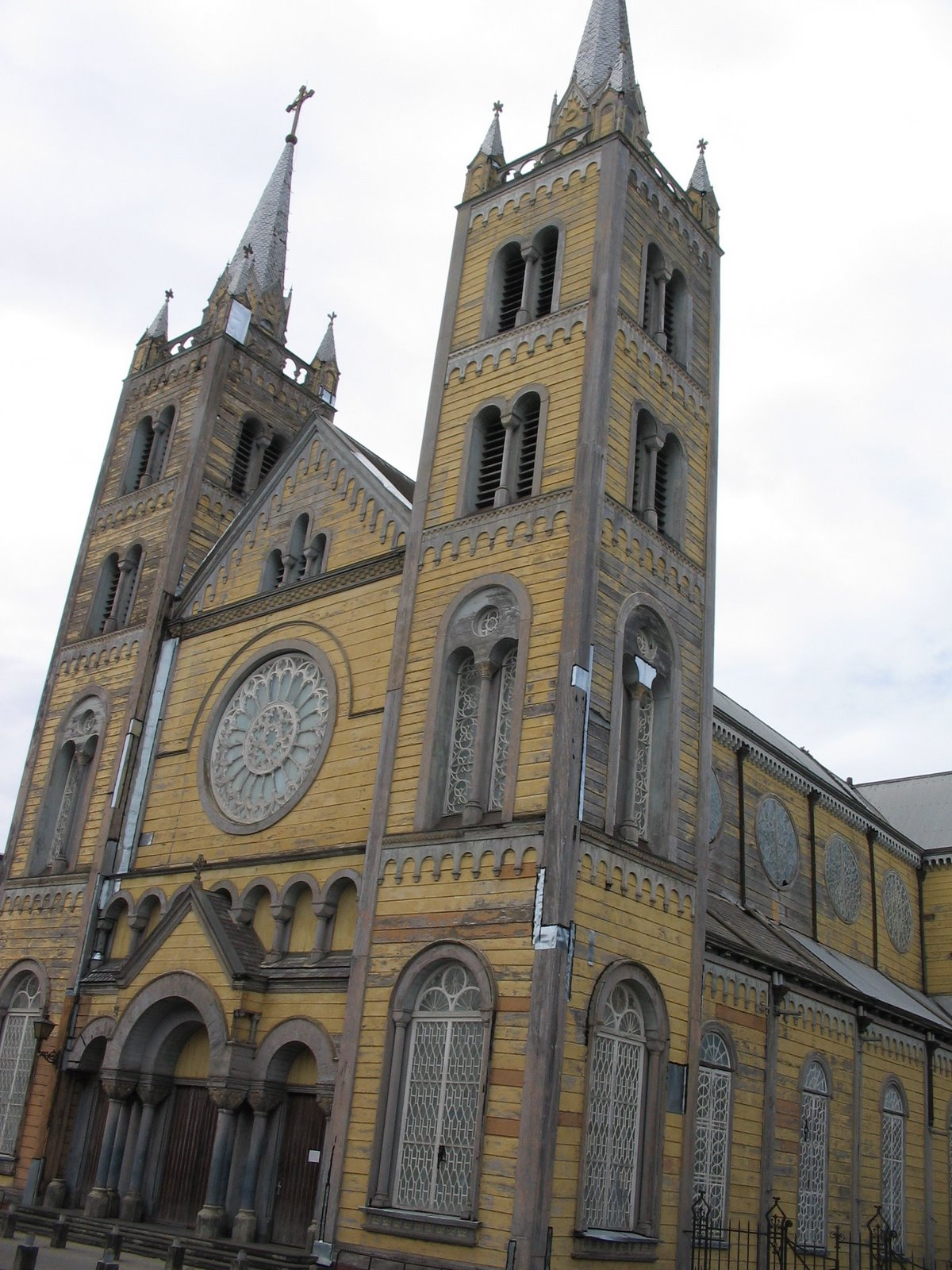
Front of Saint Peter and Paul Cathedral

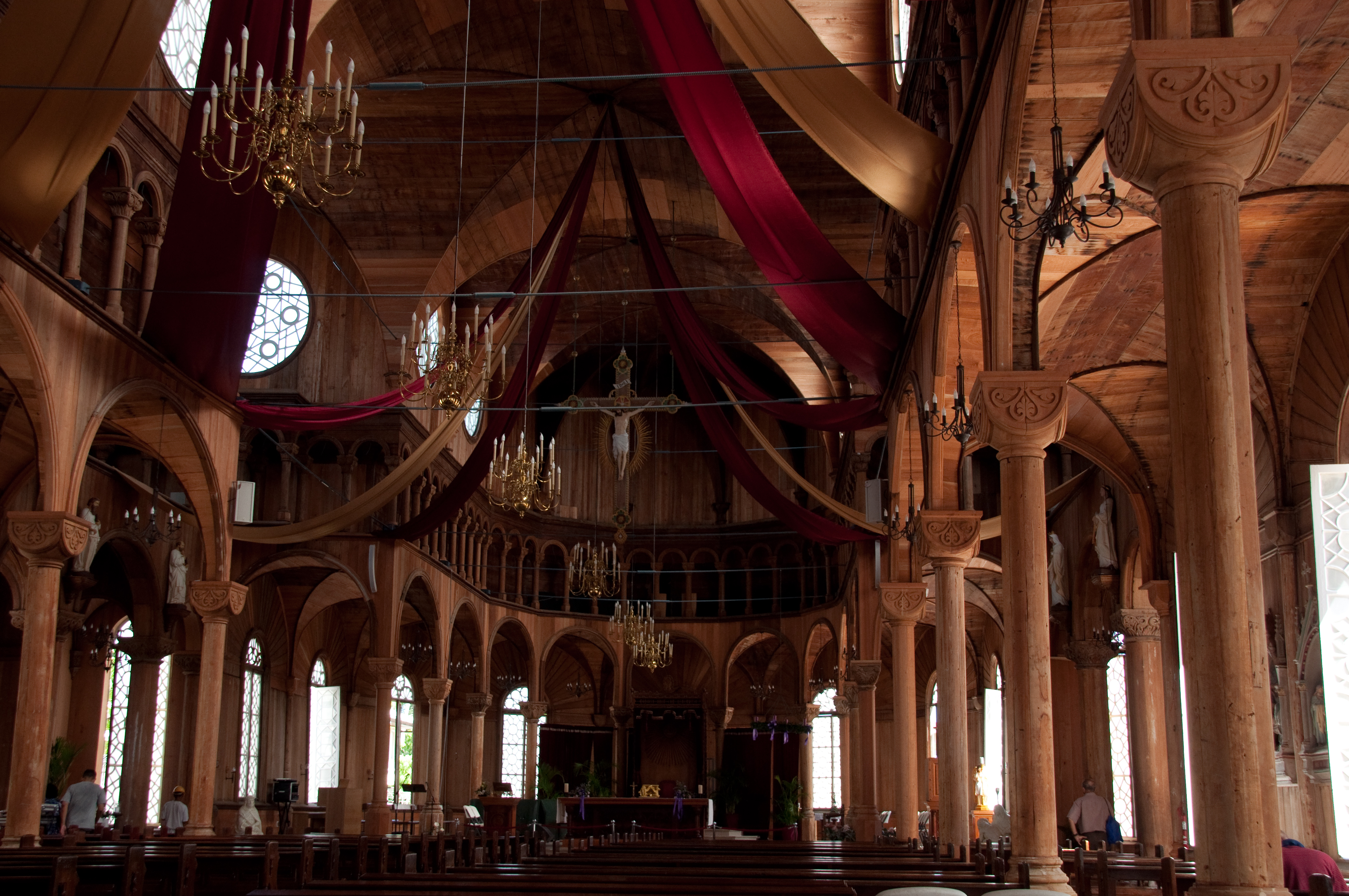
Completely wooden interior

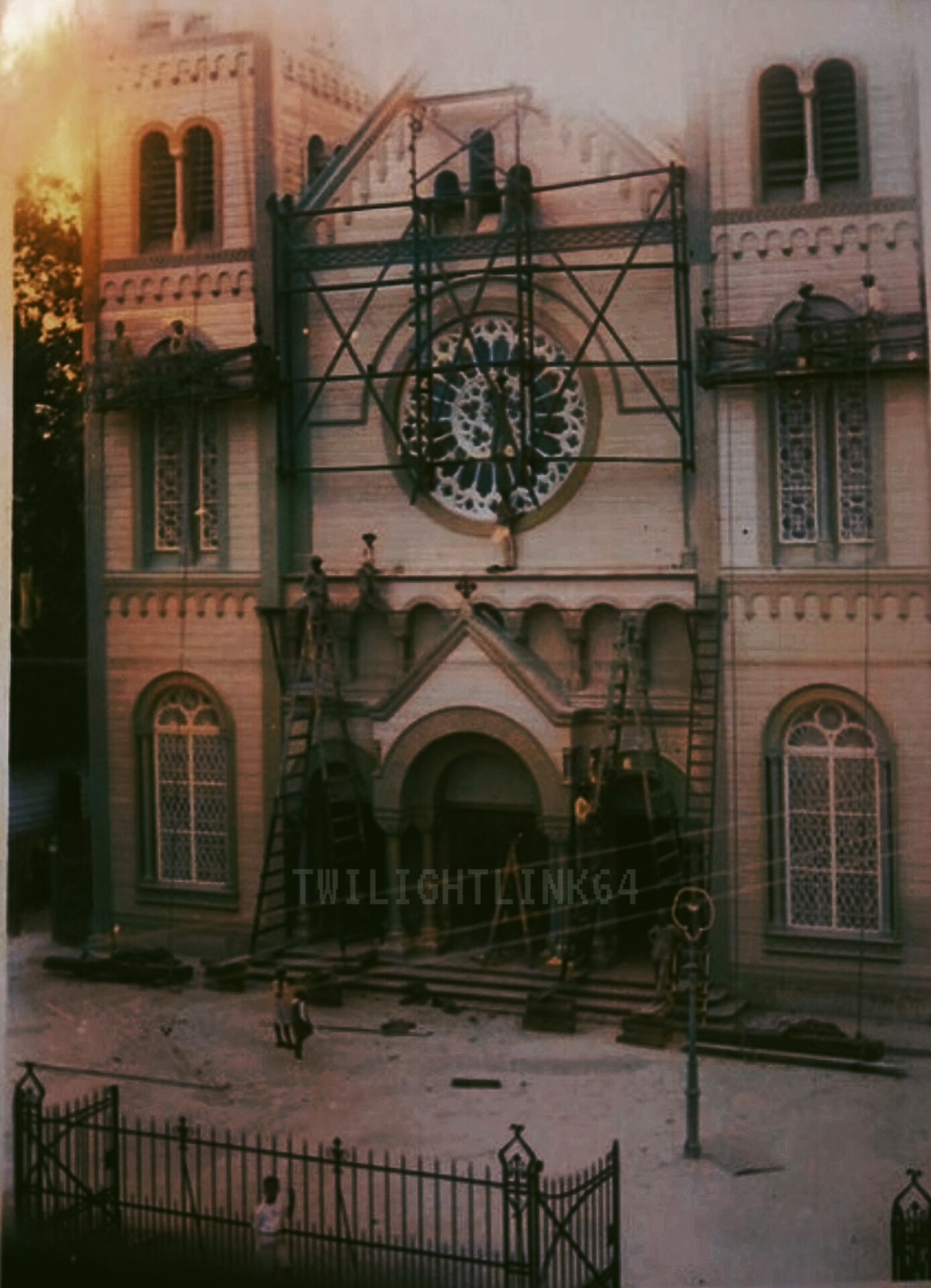
A colorized photograph of the Saint Peter and Paul Cathedral taken in the 1920s in Paramaribo, Suriname

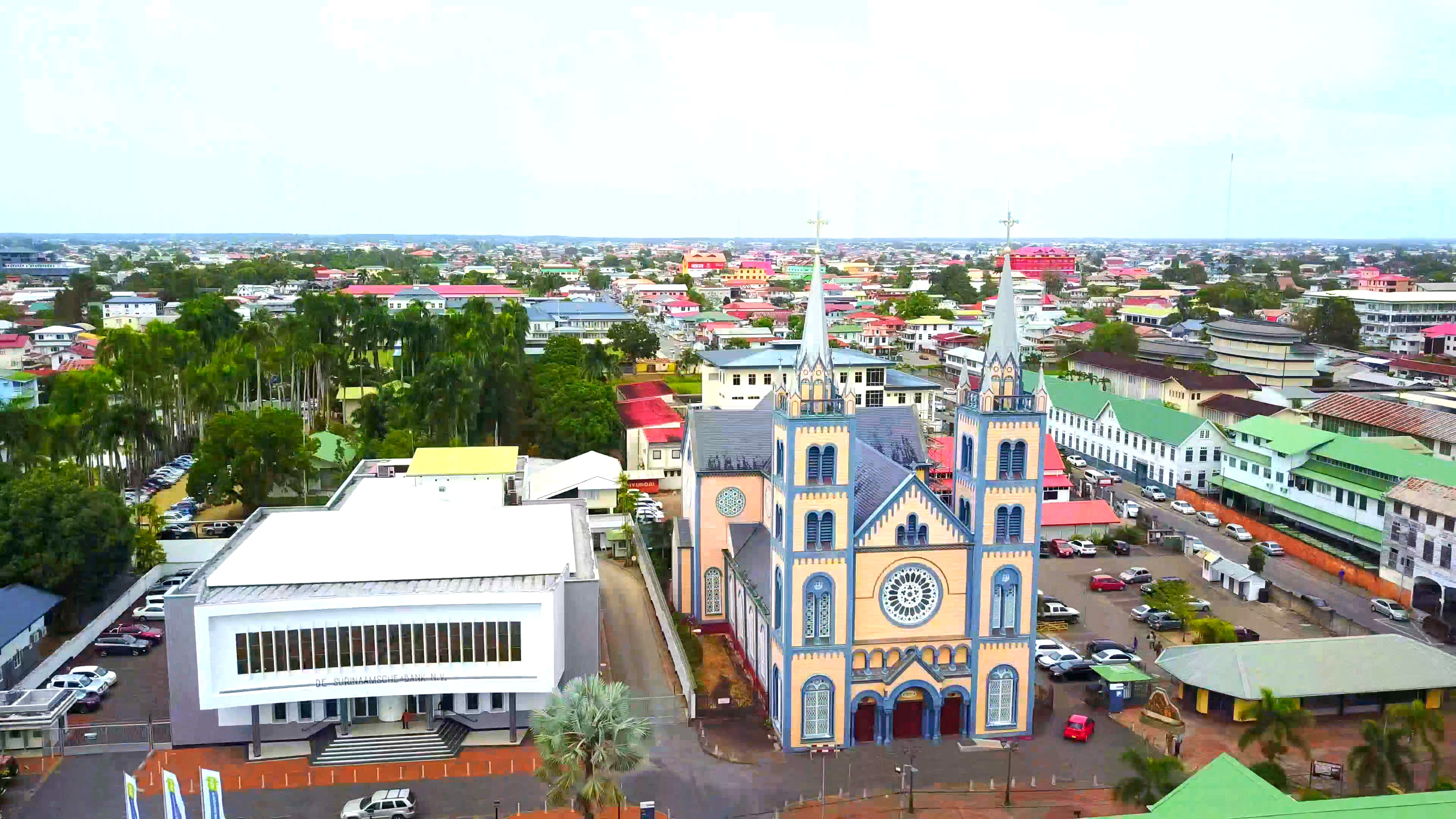
A view of the cathedral

The Cathedral-Basilica of Saint Peter and Paul, also called Saint Peter and Paul Cathedral (Dutch: Sint-Petrus-en-Pauluskathedraal), is a wooden Roman Catholic cathedral located in the centre of the capital city of Paramaribo, Suriname.

The Catholic congregation in the city originally used a church adapted in 1826 from a Dutch Jewish theatre built in 1809. As the years passed, the church became too small for the growing number of Catholics in the city. In 1882 the diocese decided to build the cathedral. It was consecrated in 1885, but the towers were not completed until 1901. A major restoration was completed in 2010 and the cathedral was re-opened. The cathedral was designated as a minor basilica by Pope Francis in 2014.

== History ==
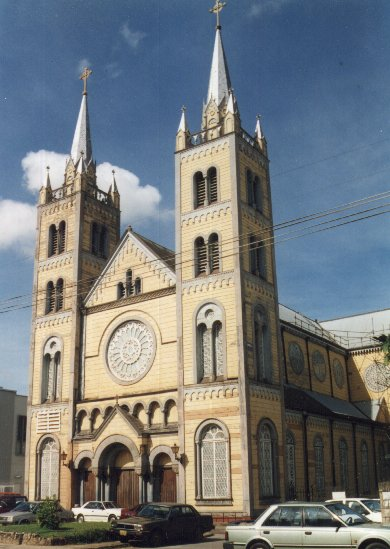
The Cathedral of St. Peter and Paul in Paramaribo

In 1826 the Roman Catholic Church in Paramaribo adapted De Verrezene Phoenix, a former Dutch Jewish theatre built in 1809, to use as a church. In 1858 it was designated as a cathedral when a diocese was established in Paramaribo and a bishop assigned.

When the congregation outgrew the building, the diocese decided to build a new cathedral. It was designed by Frans Harmes. Construction of the cathedral began January 30, 1883, on the site of De Verrezene Phoenix. The cathedral interior is built of unpainted Surinamese cedar. Although it was consecrated in 1885, the towers were not completed until 1901.

A poorly done restoration was completed in 1977, but the building began to fall into disrepair, encountering problems with tilting and termites. In 2002 an extensive renovation was completed and the cathedral was returned to usable condition. With help of European Union-funding, formal restoration of the cathedral began in 2007 and, after three years, the church was re-opened on November 13, 2010.

In 2009 the gate to the cathedral turned 200 years old.

== Structure ==
The Saint Peter and Paul Cathedral is the largest wooden structure in the Western Hemisphere. The cathedral has two confession rooms. The Dutch-Surinamese priest Peter Donders, who had attended to lepers in Batavia, is buried in here.

=== Measurements ===
- 59.1 m (194 ft) long
- 14.6 m (48 ft) high in the main hall
- 16.5 m (54 ft) wide
- 44 m (144 ft) high in the tower up to the bronze cross

This makes the cathedral the largest wooden structure in the Western Hemisphere. The cathedral has space for about 900 people and was initially built for freedmen and contract laborers.

=== Bells ===
The building has three bells in the west tower. The name of the smallest bell is Alfhonsus and it weighs 222 kg. The biggest bell is named John and it weighs 827 kg. The middle one is named Rosa, and it weighs 413 kg.

=== Pipe organ ===
The pipe organ was constructed in Germany and initially contained 1,550 pipes. Many of the pipes have been stolen over the years, leaving the organ with a value of 400 euros. After restoration, it is expected to have a value of around 10 million euros.

== See also ==
- Roman Catholic St Peter and St Paul Cathedral
