= Caricom Airways =

Surinamese airline

IATA	ICAO	Call sign
—	CRB	CARIBBEAN COMMUTER
- Founded: April 2004
- Ceased operations: September 2018
- Operating bases: Zorg en Hoop Airport
- Hubs: Johan Adolf Pengel International Airport
- Frequent-flyer program: Caricom Privilege & Caricom Privilege BIZ
- Alliance: Surinam Airways & METS
- Headquarters: Paramaribo, Suriname
- Key people: Steven Rory Michael Chin-A-Kwie (CEO) & (Managing Director)
- Website: Caricom Airways

Caricom Airways (Caribbean Commuter Airways) was a Surinamese regional airline with headquarters in Paramaribo, Suriname. Caricom Airways mainly flew charter flights from Zorg en Hoop Airport to various destinations in the interior of Suriname, the Caribbean and Northern Brazil.

The airline had earlier temporarily set plans for regular regional flights aside for cooperation with Surinam Airways (SLM). As its feeder commuter airline, Caricom carried out scheduled flights to the hinterland of Suriname for SLM. In collaboration with SLM, Caricom Airways reintroduced domestic service to various destinations in Suriname using three aircraft belonging to Caricom Airways: two Britten-Norman BN-2 Islanders and a Cessna 206. Operational control remained in the hands of Caricom Airways, while SLM periodically performed quality checks on the aircraft and audited the airline. This joint venture also included METS Tours, a subsidiary of Surinam Airways. Caricom Airways retained its identity but joined SLM's quality program and flew with their colours.

Caricom Airways was planning to add four 50 seat-turboprops to its fleet of smaller Islander, Cessna and Piper aircraft to launch regional scheduled flights. The airline did not finalize this flight schedule, but the plan was to serve Boa Vista International Airport (BVB), Bridgetown Grantley Adams International Airport (BGI), Georgetown Cheddi Jagan International Airport (GEO) and St. Lucia Hewanorra International Airport (UVF) from Paramaribo Johan Adolf Pengel International Airport (PBM). It had previously planned to operate scheduled flights to several Eastern Caribbean islands from its Caribbean hub at Saint Lucia but never received the necessary approvals.

== History ==
The company was founded on April 13, 2004, as Kuyake Aviation (Surinamese for toucan). At first the company's mission was to provide flight training towards a private or commercial pilot’s license. Kuyake Aviation started with a Cessna 337G Super Skymaster and a Cessna 172R Skyhawk. Later in 2005, a Cessna 206H Stationair was added. In August 2006, a Piper PA-31-350 Chieftain with a panther conversion was bought, followed by another Piper PA-31-350 Chieftain.

In 2009, the main focus shifted from flight training to commercial services. With this change of mission the decision was also made to split the company to Caribbean Commuter Airways N.V. (abbreviated as Caricom Airways N.V.) and Kuyake Aviation Academy.

Caricom Airways had a fleet expansion in 2010 when two Britten-Norman BN-2A Islanders arrived for passenger charters.

Kuyake Aviation was also based at the Zorg en Hoop Airport in Paramaribo, Suriname, and was a modern school facility operating a fleet of Cessna aircraft and simulators.

Caribbean Commuter Airways was divided into Caricom Airways Barbados as a regional charter airline and Caricom Airways Suriname, both using the Caribbean Commuter Airways logo, and operating as a domestic charter airline within Suriname and the Caribbean region, together with running the Caricom Airways Flight Academy effectively with Kuyake Aviation Flight Academy.

In 2011, a cooperation was reached with EZ AIR from Bonaire that allowed Caricom to regularly fly between Bonaire, Curaçao and Aruba and later to Saba and Sint Maarten using two Islanders, eventually taking over one Islander aircraft from Caricom Airways. In 2018, the owners of Caricom Airways moved to Curaçao to open up a new airline and flight school named Dutch Caribbean Islandhopper.

== Former fleet ==
Caricom Airways had a fleet of different types of aircraft.

Caricom Airways Fleet
Aircraft	Total	Passengers (Economy)	Notes
Britten Norman BN2 Islander	2	9	Surinam Airways Commuter (SLM)
Cessna 206H Stationair 6	1	5	Caricom Airways
Piper PA-31-350 Chieftain	2	9	Kuyake Aviation / Caricom Airways
Cessna 337G Skymaster	1	5	Kuyake Aviation / Caricom Airways
Cessna 172 Skyhawk	1	3	Kuyake Aviation Academy / Caricom Airways Flight Academy
Total	7

== Former destinations ==
Caricom Airways flew charters to 67 destinations, including 62 within the CARICOM and 5 abroad:

- CARICOM Destinations
- Anguilla, The Valley (Anguilla Wallblake Airport)
- Antigua, Saint John (VC Bird International Airport)
- Barbados, Bridgetown (Grantley Adams International Airport)
- Dominica, Marigot (Melville Hall Airport), Roseau (Canefield Airport)
- Grenada, St. George's (Point Salines International Airport)
- Guyana, Georgetown (Cheddi Jagan International Airport)
- Guyana, Georgetown (Ogle Airport)
- Montserrat, John A. Osborne Airport)
- Saint Kitts and Nevis, Basseterre (Robert L. Bradshaw International Airport)
- Saint Kitts and Nevis, Charlestown (Vance W. Amory International Airport)
- Saint Lucia, Castries (George FL Charles Airport)
- Saint Lucia Vieux-Fort (Hewanorra International Airport)
- Saint Vincent and the Grenadines, Kingstown (Argyle International Airport)
- Saint Vincent and the Grenadines Bequia (JF Mitchell Airport)
- Saint Vincent and the Grenadines Canouan (Canouan Airport)
- Saint Vincent and the Grenadines Mustique (Mustique Airport)
- Saint Vincent and the Grenadines Union Island (Union Island Airport)
- Suriname, Afobaka (Afobaka Airstrip)
- Suriname Alalapadu (Alalapadu Airstrip)
- Suriname Albina (Albina Airstrip)
- Suriname Amatopo (Amatopo Airstrip)
- Suriname Apetina (Apetina Airstrip)
- Suriname Bakhuis Mountains (Bakhuys Airstrip)
- Suriname Botopasi (Botopassi Airstrip)
- Suriname Cabana (Cabana Airstrip)
- Suriname Kajana (Cayana Airstrip)
- Suriname Coeroeni (Coeroeni Airstrip)
- Suriname Djoemoe (Djoemoe Airstrip)
- Suriname Donderskamp (Donderskamp Airstrip)
- Suriname Drietabbetje (Drietabbetje Airstrip)
- Suriname Gakaba (Gakaba Airstrip)
- Suriname Godo Holo (Godo Holo Airstrip)
- Suriname Gross Rose Bell (Gross Rosebell Airstrip)
- Suriname Kabalebo (Kabalebo Airstrip)
- Suriname Käyser Mountains (Käyser Airstrip)
- Suriname Kwamelasemoetoe (Kwamelasemoetoe Airstrip)
- Suriname Laduani (Laduani Airstrip)
- Suriname Langatabbetje (Langatabbetje Airstrip)
- Suriname Lawa Anapaike (Lawa Anapaike Airstrip)
- Suriname Lawa Antino (Lawa Antino Airstrip)
- Suriname Lawa Cottica (Lawa Cottica Airstrip)
- Suriname Lawa Tabiki (Lawa Tabiki Airstrip)
- Suriname Lely Mountains (Lelygebergte Airstrip)
- Suriname Moengo (Moengo Airstrip)
- Suriname, New Nickerie (Major Henk Fernandes Airport)
- Suriname, Njoeng Jacob Kondre (Njoeng Jacob Kondre Airstrip)
- Suriname Paloemeu (Paloemeu Airstrip)
- Suriname Paramaribo (Johan Adolf Pengel International Airport)
- Suriname Paramaribo (Zorg en Hoop Airport)
- Suriname Poeketi (Poeketi Airstrip)
- Suriname Poesoegroenoe (Poesoegroenoe Airstrip)
- Suriname Ragoebarsing (Ragoebarsing Airstrip)
- Suriname Raleigh Falls (Raleigh Airstrip)
- Suriname Sarakreek (Sarakreek Airstrip)
- Suriname Saramacca (Henri Alwies Airstrip)
- Suriname Sipaliwini Savanna (Sipaliwini Airstrip)
- Suriname Stoelmanseiland (Stoelmanseiland Airstrip)
- Suriname, Tafelberg (Tafelberg Airstrip)
- Suriname Tepoe (Tepoe Airstrip)
- Suriname Totnes (Totness Airstrip)
- Suriname, Four Brothers (Vier Gebroeders Airstrip)
- Suriname Wageningen (Wageningen Airstrip)
- Tobago, Scarborough (Crown Point Airport)
- Trinidad, Port of Spain (Piarco International Airport)

Outside the CARICOM:

- Brazil, Belém (Val de Cans International Airport)
- Brazil Boa Vista (Boa Vista International Airport)
- Brazil Macapá (Macapa International Airport)
- Brazil Manaus (Eduardo Gomes International Airport)
- Brazil Santarém (Santarém Airport)
