= List of airports in Suriname =

This is a list of airports in Suriname, sorted by location.

Suriname, officially the Republic of Suriname, is a country in northern South America. It is situated between French Guiana to the east and Guyana to the west. The southern border is shared with Brazil and the northern border is the Atlantic coast. Suriname is the smallest sovereign state in terms of area and population in South America. The country is the only Dutch-speaking region in the Western Hemisphere that is not a part of the Kingdom of the Netherlands.

== Airports ==
Airport names shown in bold indicate the airport has scheduled service on commercial airlines.

City served / location	District	ICAO	IATA	Airport name
Afobaka	Brokopondo	SMAF		Afobaka Airstrip
Alalapadu	Sipaliwini	SMDU		Alalapadu Airstrip
Albina	Marowijne	SMBN	ABN	Albina Airstrip
Amatopo	Sipaliwini	SMAM		Amatopo Airstrip
Anapaike	Sipaliwini	SMLA		Lawa Anapaike Airstrip
Antino / Benzdorp	Sipaliwini	SMAN		Lawa Antino Airstrip
Apetina	Sipaliwini	SMPT		Apetina Airstrip
Avanavero	Sipaliwini	SMVO		Avanavero Airstrip
Bakhuys	Sipaliwini	SMBG		Bakhuys Airstrip
Groot Henar	Nickerie	SMAL		Alupi Airstrip
Botopasi	Sipaliwini	SMBO	BTO	Botopasi Airstrip
Cabana	Sipaliwini	SMCB		Cabana Airstrip
Cayana	Sipaliwini	SMCA	AAJ	Cayana Airstrip
Kuruni (Coeroenie)	Sipaliwini	SMCI		Coeroenie Airstrip
Cottica	Sipaliwini	SMCT		Lawa Cottica Airstrip
Djumu / Asidonhopo	Sipaliwini	SMDJ	DOE	Djumu Airstrip
Donderskamp	Sipaliwini	SMDK		Donderskamp Airstrip
Drietabbetje	Sipaliwini	SMDA	DRJ	Drietabbetje Airstrip
Gakaba	Sipaliwini	SMGA		Gakaba Airstrip
Godo Holo (Godo Olo) Pikienkondre de Miranda	Sipaliwini	SMGH		Godo Holo Airstrip
Rosebel Gold Mine	Brokopondo	SMGR		Gross Rosebel Airstrip
Peperhol	Saramacca	SMHA		Henri Alwies Airstrip
Jarikaba	Saramacca	SMJA		Jarikaba Airstrip
Kabalebo	Sipaliwini	SMKA		Kabalebo Airstrip
Tapanahony ressort	Sipaliwini	SMKM		Kami Kami Airstrip
Käyser Mountains	Sipaliwini	SMKE		Käyser Jan Gouka Airstrip (Eilerts de Haan Airstrip)
Kwamelasemoetoe	Sipaliwini	SMSM		Kwamelasemoetoe Airstrip
Laduani (Ladouanie)	Sipaliwini	SMDO	LDO	Laduani Airstrip
Langatabbetje	Sipaliwini	SMLT		Langatabbetje Airstrip
Lelygebergte (Lely Gebergte)	Sipaliwini	SMLI		Lelygebergte Airstrip
Moengo (Mungo)	Marowijne	SMMO	MOJ	Moengo Airstrip
Nieuw Nickerie	Nickerie	SMNI	ICK	Major Henk Fernandes Airport
Nieuw Jacobkondre	Sipaliwini	SMJK		Njoeng Jacob Kondre Airstrip
Oelemari (Ulemari)	Sipaliwini	SMOL		Oelemari Airport
Paloemeu (Palumeu)	Sipaliwini	SMPA	OEM	Vincent Fajks Airport
Paramaribo	Paramaribo	SMEG	EAX	Eduard Alexander Gummels Airport
Paramaribo	Paramaribo	SMZO	ORG	**Zorg en Hoop Airport**
Poeketi	Sipaliwini	SMPE		Poeketi Airstrip
Poesoegroenoe (Pusugrunu)	Sipaliwini	SMPG		Poesoegroenoe Airstrip
Raghoebarsing	Sipaliwini	SMRN		Raghoebarsing Airstrip
Raleighvallen	Sipaliwini	SMRA		Raleigh Airstrip
Sarakreek	Brokopondo	SMSK		Sarakreek Airstrip
Sipaliwini Savanna	Sipaliwini	SMSI		Sipaliwini Airstrip
Stoelmanseiland (Stoelmans Eiland)	Sipaliwini	SMST	SMZ	Stoelmans Eiland Airstrip
Tabiki / Benzdorp	Sipaliwini	SMTA		Lawa Tabiki Airstrip
Tafelberg	Sipaliwini	SMTB		Rudi Kappel Airstrip
Tepoe (Tepu) /	Sipaliwini	SMTP	KCB	Tepoe Airstrip
Totness / Coronie	Coronie	SMCO	TOT	Totness Airstrip
Vier Gebroeders	Sipaliwini	SMVG		Vier Gebroeders Airstrip
Wageningen	Nickerie	SMWA	AGI	Wageningen Airstrip
Washabo (Closed)	Sipaliwini	SMWS	WSO	Washabo Airport
Zanderij	Para	SMJP	PBM	**Johan Adolf Pengel International Airport**

Airports with unverified coordinates:

City served / location	District	ICAO	IATA	Airport name
Baitali	Sipaliwini	SMBA		Baitali Airstrip
Satrio	Nickerie	SMSA		Satrio Airstrip

== Map ==
Airports and airstrips in Suriname

== See also ==
- Transport in Suriname
- Operation Grasshopper
- List of airports by ICAO code: S#SM - Suriname
- Wikipedia: WikiProject Aviation/Airline destination lists: South America#Suriname
