= Alupi Airstrip =

Airstrip in Suriname

- IATA: none; ICAO: none; LID: SR-0004

Summary
- Airport type: Public
- Operator: Luchtvaartdienst Suriname
- Serves: Groot Henar, Suriname
- Elevation AMSL: 7 ft / 2 m
- Coordinates: 5°49′10″N 56°48′56″W

Map
- Location of the airstrip in Suriname

Runways
Direction	Length		Surface
Direction	m	ft	Surface
05/23	760	2,493	Grass, asphalt
- Sources: OurAirports Bing Maps

Alupi Airstrip is a rural airstrip in Groot Henar serving the rice growing region southeast of Nieuw Nickerie, in the Nickerie District of Suriname. The airstrip is next to the Nickerie River.

== Charters and destinations ==
Charter airlines and cropdusters serving this airport are:

Airlines	Destinations
Blue Wing Airlines	Charter: Paramaribo–Zorg en Hoop
Gum Air	Charter: Paramaribo–Zorg en Hoop
Hi-Jet Helicopter Services	Charter: Paramaribo–Zorg en Hoop
Pegasus Air Services	Charter: Paramaribo–Zorg en Hoop
Surinam Sky Farmers	Cropdusting: Nickerie
Overeem Air Service	Cropdusting: Nickerie
Coronie Aero Farming	Cropdusting: Nickerie
ERK Farms	Cropdusting: Nickerie
Eagle Air Services	Cropdusting: Nickerie

== See also ==
- List of airports in Suriname
- Transport in Suriname
