= Afobaka Airstrip =

Afobaka Airstrip Afobakka Airstrip
- IATA: none; ICAO: SMAF

Summary
- Airport type: Public
- Operator: Luchtvaartdienst Suriname
- Location: Afobaka, Suriname
- Elevation AMSL: 80 ft (24 m)
- Coordinates: 4°59′55″N 54°59′32″W

Map
- Location in Suriname

Runways
Direction	Length		Surface
Direction	m	ft	Surface
03/21	795	2,608	grass
- Sources: GCM Google Maps

Afobaka Airstrip (ICAO: SMAF) is an airstrip near Afobaka, a village in the Brokopondo District of Suriname. The airstrip is primarily used for emergency evacuation and gold shipment. It is 5 kilometres (3.1 mi) from the campsite of the Gross Rosebel gold mine, which has its own airstrip.

== History of the airstrip ==
Between 1960 and 1964, the 1913 meter-long Afobaka Dam was built on the Suriname River, creating the Brokopondo Reservoir. The airstrip is 1.6 kilometres (0.99 mi) north of the dam.

== Airlines and destinations ==
Airlines serving this airport are:

Airlines	Destinations
Blue Wing Airlines	Charter: Paramaribo–Zorg en Hoop
Gum Air	Charter: Paramaribo–Zorg en Hoop

== See also ==
- List of airports in Suriname
- Transport in Suriname
