= Avanavero Airstrip =

- IATA: none; ICAO: SMVO

Summary
- Airport type: Public
- Operator: Luchtvaartdienst Suriname
- Location: Avanavero, Suriname
- Coordinates: 4°49′30″N 57°17′00″W

Map
- Location in Suriname

Runways
Direction	Length		Surface
Direction	m	ft	Surface
10/28	1,000	3,281	grass
- Sources: Google Maps

Avanavero Airstrip (ICAO: SMVO), near Avanavero, Suriname. It was one of the airstrips constructed in the aftermath of Operation Grasshopper.

== Facilities ==
The Avanavero Airstrip has one unpaved runway. It is built near the Avanavero Falls, locally called Avanavero Vallen or Avanavero Sula.

== Airlines and destinations ==
Currently, no scheduled services are offered from Kabalebo. Charter airlines serving this airport are:

Airlines	Destinations
Blue Wing Airlines	Charter: Paramaribo–Zorg en Hoop
Gum Air	Charter: Paramaribo–Zorg en Hoop
Hi-Jet Helicopter Services	Charter: Paramaribo–Zorg en Hoop
United Air Services	Charter: Paramaribo–Zorg en Hoop

== Accidents and incidents ==
- (Suriname (Kingdom of the Netherlands)) On 8 May 1967 a helicopter Agusta-Bell 47J-2A, with Dutch registration PH-VAS made an emergency landing. The helicopter from General Aviation at Rotterdam Airport, the Netherlands was flying from its base Avanavero (SMVO), Suriname under contract for SLM used on a Hydro Electric Power Project for "Bureau Waterkracht Werken". At take off from Avanavero Airfield (SMVO) on an oil supply flight the wind blew the main rotor from PH-VAS into a wooden flag-pole, forcing the Dutch pilot Mr. P.H. Janssen to make an emergency running landing. The damage was small and no injuries occurred.

== See also ==
- List of airports in Suriname
- Transport in Suriname
