= SMAM =

SMAM may refer to:

- Amatopo Airstrip, ICAO code
- Structural moving average model
- Studio de musique ancienne de Montréal
