= Oelemari Airstrip =

Airstrip in Suriname

- IATA: none; ICAO: SMOL

Summary
- Airport type: Public
- Operator: Luchtvaartdienst Suriname
- Location: Oelemari River, Suriname
- Elevation AMSL: 483 ft / 147 m
- Coordinates: 3°06′15″N 54°32′35″W

Map
- Location in Suriname

Runways
Direction	Length		Surface
Direction	m	ft	Surface
07/25			grass
- Sources: Google Maps

Oelemari Airstrip (ICAO: SMOL) is an airstrip located near the Oelemari River in Suriname. This small grass airstrip was constructed as part of the Operation Grasshopper project in Suriname.

== Airstrip history ==
The Oelemari Airstrip is a small airport with an unpaved runway in southwestern Suriname of which the runway is laid out in the framework of Operation Grasshopper and it is named after the Oelemari River. Beginning 1960 an expedition, led by Ir. Herman I.L. van Eyck, arrived there to be able to start the construction of the runway. On July 9 of that year a Northrop YC-125 Raider, a three-engined STOL utility transport airplane landed there for the first time, which was used for further construction. More than a month later that same plane, which was leased by the Surinaamse Luchtvaart Maatschappij from Ambrose Aviation in the U.S., crashed there. Oelemari was opened for public traffic in March 1962.

== Charters and destinations ==
Airlines serving charter flights to this airport are:

Airlines	Destinations
Blue Wing Airlines	Charter: Paramaribo–Zorg en Hoop
Gum Air	Charter: Paramaribo–Zorg en Hoop
Hi-Jet Helicopter Services	Charter: Paramaribo–Zorg en Hoop

== Accidents and incidents ==
- On 15 August 1960 a Northrop YC-125B Raider stalled during landing at Oelemari and was reported written-off with no fatalities. The pilot was D.L. Walker. The airplane was leased by the Surinamese Government/SLM from Ambrose Aviation for equipment transport for landing-strip construction, under "Operation Grasshopper".

== See also ==
- List of airports in Suriname
- Transport in Suriname
