= Sipaliwini =

- Sipaliwini River, river in Suriname
- Sipaliwini District, district in Suriname
- Sipaliwini Savanna (town), also called Sipaliwini, town in Suriname, in the Sipaliwini District
- Sipaliwini Airstrip, an airstrip in Sipaliwini Savana
