= Jarikaba Airstrip =

Airstrip in Suriname

- IATA: none; ICAO: SMJA

Summary
- Airport type: Public
- Operator: Luchtvaartdienst Suriname
- Serves: Jarikaba
- Elevation AMSL: 19 ft / 6 m
- Coordinates: 5°49′35″N 55°20′15″W

Map
- Location in Suriname

Runways
Direction	Length		Surface
Direction	m	ft	Surface
09/27	610	2,001	Asphalt, grass
- Sources: Bing Maps Google Maps

Jarikaba Airstrip (ICAO: SMJA) is an airstrip serving the town of Jarikaba in Suriname. Jarikaba is a western suburb of Paramaribo.

The runway has 350 metres (1,150 ft) of asphalt followed by 260 metres (850 ft) of grass.

== Cropdusting airlines ==
Charter airlines and Cropdusting Airlines serving this airport are:

Airlines	Destinations
Gum Air	Charter: Paramaribo–Zorg en Hoop
Hi-Jet Helicopter Services	Charter: Paramaribo–Zorg en Hoop
Pegasus Air Services	Charter: Paramaribo–Zorg en Hoop
Surinam Sky Farmers	Cropdusting: Saramacca
Overeem Air Service	Cropdusting: Saramacca
Coronie Aero Farming	Cropdusting: Saramacca
ERK Farms	Cropdusting: Saramacca
Eagle Air Services	Cropdusting: Saramacca

== See also ==
- List of airports in Suriname
- Transport in Suriname
