= Henri Alwies Airstrip =

Henri Alwies Airstrip Henri Alwies Vliegveld
- IATA: none; ICAO: SMHA

Summary
- Airport type: Public
- Operator: Luchtvaartdienst Suriname
- Location: Antongron, Saramacca, Suriname
- Elevation AMSL: 22 ft / 7 m
- Coordinates: 5°49′55″N 55°38′15″W

Map
- Location in Suriname

Runways
Direction	Length		Surface
Direction	m	ft	Surface
11/29	600	1,969	Base course gravel & grass
- Sources: Google Maps

Henri Alwies Airstrip (Dutch: Henri Alwies Vliegveld) (IATA: SMHA), also known as Henri Alwies Airfield or Henri Alwies Vliegveld, is in the Saramacca district of Suriname. This is one of the newest airports in Suriname, in use since April 5, 2012.

It is the homebase of the crop dusting company ERK Farms, and was also heavily used by the Gliders Club Zweefvliegclub Akka.

== History ==
On March 24, 2013, an Open Day was held at the new Henri Alwies Airfield with multiple planes from Zorg en Hoop Airport and a demonstration from Skydive Free 2 Fly Suriname jumping parachutes from a privately owned Britten-Norman BN-2 Islander (N26NB). Surinamese Minister Of Sport & Youth, Ismanto Adna, participated with a tandem parachute jump. A crop dusting demonstration was performed by pilot Martin Veldkamp with a Grumman G-164B Ag-Cat B (PZ-USB) from ERK Farms.

== Charters and destinations ==
Charter airlines and cropdusters serving this airport are:

Airlines	Destinations
Blue Wing Airlines	Charter: Paramaribo–Zorg en Hoop
Gum Air	Charter: Paramaribo–Zorg en Hoop
Hi-Jet Helicopter Services	Charter: Paramaribo–Zorg en Hoop
Pegasus Air Services	Charter: Paramaribo–Zorg en Hoop
Surinam Sky Farmers	Cropdusting: Saramacca
Overeem Air Service	Cropdusting: Saramacca
Coronie Aero Farming	Cropdusting: Saramacca
ERK Farms	Cropdusting: Saramacca
Eagle Air Services	Cropdusting: Saramacca

== See also ==
- List of airports in Suriname
- Transport in Suriname
