= Gakaba Airstrip =

Airstrip in Gakaba, Suriname

Gakaba Airstrip Gaa Caba
- IATA: none; ICAO: SMGA

Summary
- Airport type: Public
- Operator: Luchtvaartdienst Suriname
- Location: Gakaba
- Elevation AMSL: 192 ft / 59 m
- Coordinates: 4°27′15″N 54°26′45″W

Map
- Location in Suriname

Runways
Direction	Length		Surface
Direction	m	ft	Surface
06/24	750	2,461	Asphalt
- Sources: Google Maps HERE/Nokia Maps

Gakaba Airstrip (IATA: SMGA) is an airstrip near Gakaba, a hamlet on the Maroni River in Suriname. The runway is just west of the hamlet.

== Charters and destinations ==
Charter airlines serving this airport are:

Airlines	Destinations
Blue Wing Airlines	Charter: Paramaribo–Zorg en Hoop
Gum Air	Charter: Paramaribo–Zorg en Hoop
Hi-Jet Helicopter Services	Charter: Paramaribo–Zorg en Hoop

== See also ==
- List of airports in Suriname
- Transport in Suriname
