= Donderskamp Airstrip =

Airstrip serving Donderskamp, Suriname

- IATA: none; ICAO: SMDK

Summary
- Airport type: Public
- Operator: Luchtvaartdienst Suriname
- Location: Donderskamp
- Coordinates: 5°21′05″N 56°21′40″W

Map
- Location in Suriname

Runways
Direction	Length		Surface
Direction	m	ft	Surface
09/27	535	1,755	Grass
- Sources: Bing Maps

Donderskamp Airstrip (IATA: SMDK) is an airstrip near Donderskamp, Suriname.

== Charters and destinations ==
Charter airlines serving this airport are:

Airlines	Destinations
Blue Wing Airlines	Charter: Paramaribo–Zorg en Hoop
Gum Air	Charter: Paramaribo–Zorg en Hoop
Hi-Jet Helicopter Services	Charter: Paramaribo–Zorg en Hoop
United Air Services	Charter: Paramaribo–Zorg en Hoop
Vortex Aviation Suriname	Charter: Paramaribo–Zorg en Hoop

== See also ==
- List of airports in Suriname
- Transport in Suriname
