= Raleigh Airstrip =

Airstrip in Suriname

Raleigh Airstrip Raleighvallen Airstrip
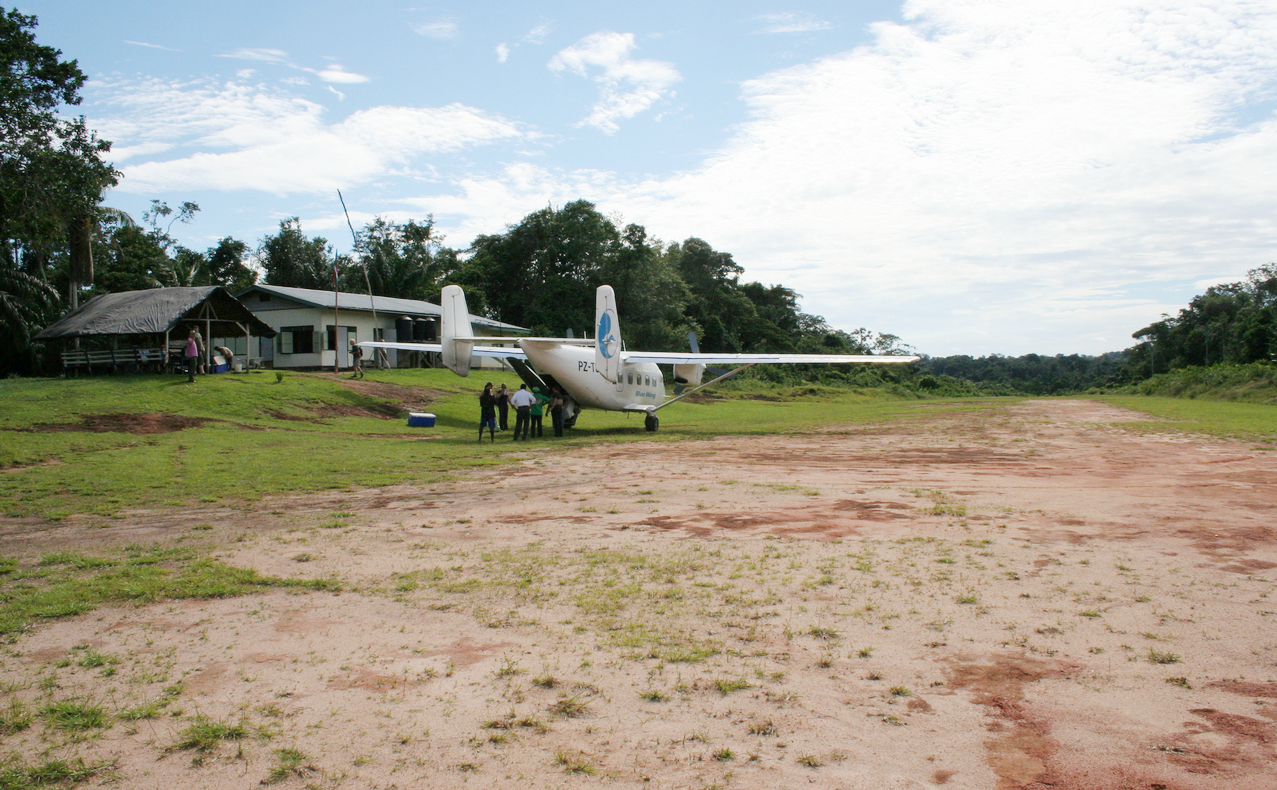
- IATA: none; ICAO: SMRA

Summary
- Airport type: Public
- Operator: Luchtvaartdienst Suriname
- Serves: Central Suriname Nature Reserve
- Elevation AMSL: 109 ft / 33 m
- Coordinates: 4°43′22″N 56°12′30″W

Map
- Location in Suriname

Runways
Direction	Length		Surface
Direction	m	ft	Surface
09/27	500	1,640	Grass
- Sources: Bing Maps Google Maps

Raleigh Vallen Airstrip (IATA: SMRA) is an airstrip serving the Central Suriname Nature Reserve, Suriname. The runway is on Fungu Tabiki, an island in the Coppename River.

The airstrip is an entry and/or exit point for many nature hiking tours to the cascading Raleigh Falls and to Voltzberg, one of several black granite monoliths in the Central Suriname Nature Reserve.

== Charters and destinations ==
Charter airlines serving this airport are:

Airlines	Destinations
Blue Wing Airlines	Charter: Paramaribo–Zorg en Hoop
Gum Air	Charter: Paramaribo–Zorg en Hoop
Hi-Jet Helicopter Services	Charter: Paramaribo–Zorg en Hoop

== See also ==
- List of airports in Suriname
- Transport in Suriname
