= Kami Kami Airstrip =

Airstrip serving Kami Kami, Suriname

- IATA: none; ICAO: SMKM

Summary
- Airport type: Public
- Serves: Kami Kami, Suriname
- Elevation AMSL: 237 ft / 72 m
- Coordinates: 4°32′57″N 54°36′10″W

Map
- Location of the airport in Suriname

Runways
Direction	Length		Surface
Direction	m	ft	Surface
08/26	540	1,772	Grass
- Sources: Reliefweb HERE Maps

Kami Kami Airstrip (ICAO: SMKM) is an airstrip serving the small gold mining camp of Kami Kami in the Sipaliwini District of Suriname.

== See also ==
- Transport in Suriname
- List of airports in Suriname
