= Kabalebo Airstrip =

- IATA: none; ICAO: SMKA

Summary
- Airport type: Public
- Operator: Luchtvaartdienst Suriname
- Location: Kabalebo, Suriname
- Elevation AMSL: 535 ft (163 m)
- Coordinates: 004°24′25″N 057°13′25″W

Map
- Location in Suriname

Runways
Direction	Length		Surface
Direction	m	ft	Surface
07/25	875	2,871	grass
- Sources: GCM Google Maps

Kabalebo Airstrip (ICAO: SMKA) serves the village of Kabalebo, Suriname. It was constructed as part of Operation Grasshopper.

== Facilities ==
The Kabalebo Airstrip has one long unpaved runway. The main-lodge of the Kabalebo Nature Resort and its swimming pool are adjacent to the runway.

== Airlines and destinations ==
Currently, no scheduled services are offered from Kabalebo. Charter airlines serving this airport are:

Airlines	Destinations
Blue Wing Airlines	Charter: Paramaribo–Zorg en Hoop
Gum Air	Charter: Paramaribo–Zorg en Hoop
Hi-Jet Helicopter Services	Charter: Paramaribo–Zorg en Hoop
United Air Services	Charter: Paramaribo–Zorg en Hoop

== Accidents and incidents ==
- (Suriname (Kingdom of the Netherlands)) On 23 June 1965 a Beech G18S, registration PZ-TAR from the Surinaamse Luchtvaart Maatschappij equipped with JATO (Jet Assisted Take Off) rockets crashed at Kabalebo. There were no fatalities; the pilot was J. den Besten.

== See also ==
- List of airports in Suriname
- Transport in Suriname
