= Lelygebergte Airstrip =

Lelygebergte Airstrip Lely Airstrip
- IATA: none; ICAO: SMLI

Summary
- Airport type: Public
- Operator: Luchtvaartdienst Suriname
- Location: Lelygebergte, southwest plateau
- Elevation AMSL: 2,217 ft / 676 m
- Coordinates: 4°16′05″N 54°44′35″W

Map
- Location in Suriname

Runways
Direction	Length		Surface
Direction	m	ft	Surface
11/29	650	2,133	Grass
- Sources: Google Maps Lely Gold Project

Lelygebergte Airstrip (IATA: SMLI), is an airstrip on the southwestern plateau of Lelygebergte mountain, Suriname. It was built in the early 1970s by Suriname Aluminum Company, L.L.C. ("Suralco") to facilitate their exploration for bauxite.

== Charters and destinations ==
Charter airlines serving this airport are:

Airlines	Destinations
Blue Wing Airlines	Charter: Paramaribo–Zorg en Hoop
Gum Air	Charter: Paramaribo–Zorg en Hoop
Hi-Jet Helicopter Services	Charter: Paramaribo–Zorg en Hoop

== See also ==
- List of airports in Suriname
- Transport in Suriname
