= Botopasi Airstrip =

Airstrip serving Botopasi, Suriname

Botopasi Airstrip Botopassi Airstrip
- IATA: BTO; ICAO: SMBO

Summary
- Airport type: Public
- Operator: Luchtvaartdienst Suriname
- Location: Botopasi, Suriname
- Elevation AMSL: 242 ft / 74 m
- Coordinates: 04°13′07″N 055°26′46″W

Map
- Location in Suriname

Runways
| Direction | Length | | Surface |
| Direction | m | ft | Surface |
|---|---|---|---|
| 05/23 | 550 | 1,804 | grass |
- Sources: GCM Google Maps

Botopasi Airstrip (IATA: BTO, ICAO: SMBO) is an airstrip serving Botopasi, Suriname.

== History of the airstrip ==
The Botopasi Airstrip was constructed by the Surinamese Medical Missionary Service, the "Surinaamse Medische Zendings Vliegdienst", also called the “Medische Zending Suriname” and was frequently visited by the Mission Aviation Fellowship. It was the first airstrip at the Upper Surinam River and was destined to facilitate transport to Paramaribo from the clinics Pokigron, Ladoani, Debikè and Dyumu. The first landing took place on 14 January 1963 by the American pilot Ted Lepper in his Piper Cub N 5406H. For many years the MAF (Missionary Aviation Fellowship) remained the main user of the airstrip. Nowadays multiple flights are available by many charter companies.

== Charters and destinations ==
Charter airlines serving this airport are:

| Airlines | Destinations |
|---|---|
| Blue Wing Airlines | Charter: Paramaribo–Zorg en Hoop |
| Gum Air | Charter: Paramaribo–Zorg en Hoop |
| Hi-Jet Helicopter Services | Charter: Paramaribo–Zorg en Hoop |
| United Air Services | Charter: Paramaribo–Zorg en Hoop |
| Vortex Aviation Suriname | Charter: Paramaribo–Zorg en Hoop |

== Accidents and incidents ==
- On 23 August 1986 a Cessna 172L Skyhawk with registration PZ-NAN from the Aero Club Suriname was damaged landing at Botopasi, the pilot was J. Jaeger. The plane was repaired and returned to its home-base at Zorg en Hoop Airport.
- On 25 September 1986 a Cessna U206G Stationair 6, registration PZ-TAC from Gonini Air Service was hijacked at Apetina kondre airstrip by rebels of the "Jungle Commando" of Ronnie Brunswijk. The pilot (O. van Amson jr.) was forced to fly the aircraft to an unknown location. In May 1988 the airplane was at the Botopasi Airstrip in Suriname with a flat tire; apparently at that time in use by the jungle commando. The aircraft never returned to the owner and was canceled from the Surinamese Aviation register in 1993.

== See also ==
- List of airports in Suriname
- Transport in Suriname
