= Cayana Airstrip =

Airport in Kajana, Suriname, Suriname

Cayana Airstrip Kajana Airstrip
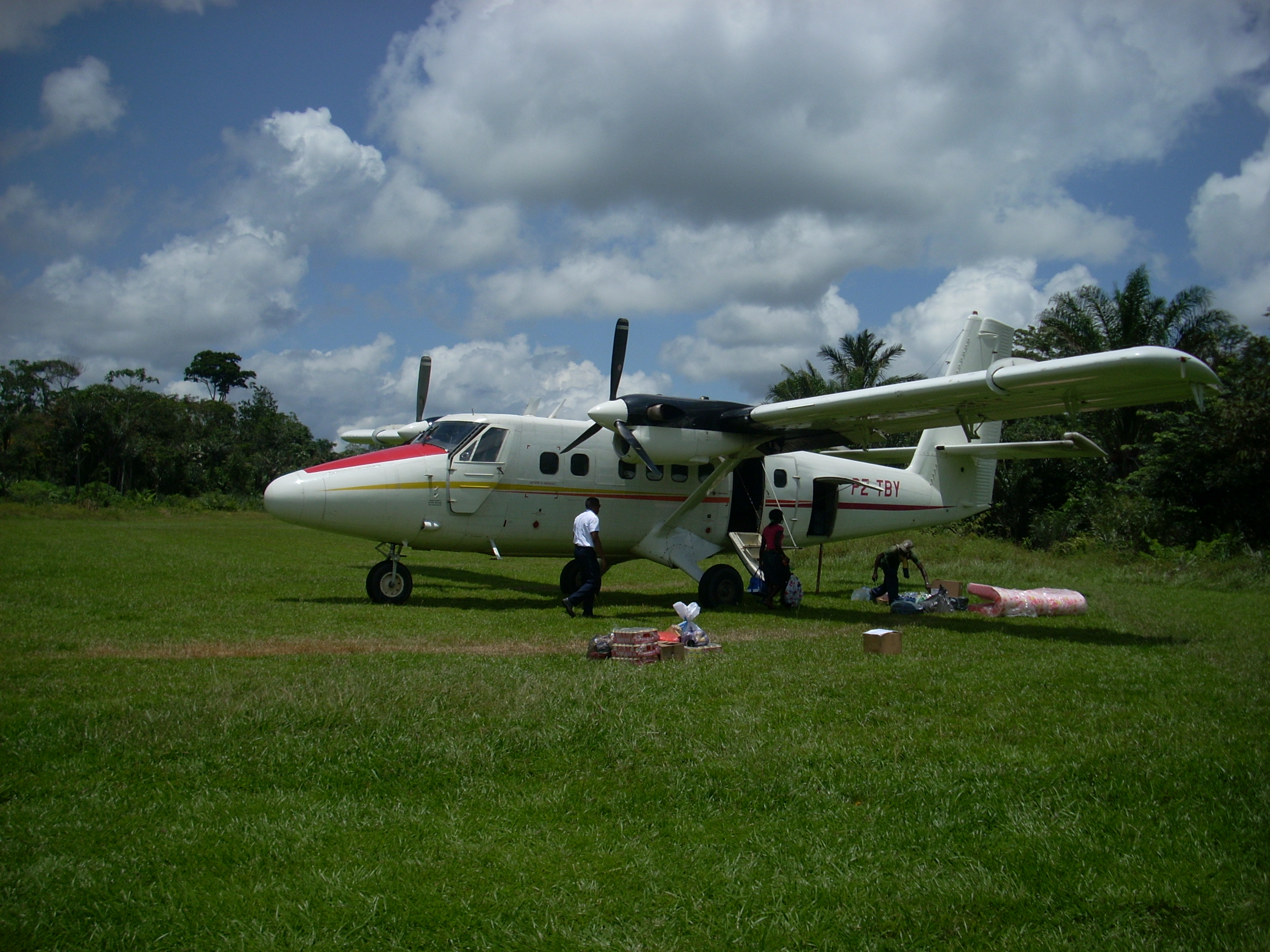
- IATA: AAJ; ICAO: SMCA

Summary
- Airport type: Public
- Operator: Luchtvaartdienst Suriname
- Location: Kajana, Suriname
- Elevation AMSL: 360 ft / 110 m
- Coordinates: 3°53′55″N 55°34′40″W

Map
- Location of airport in Suriname

Runways
Direction	Length		Surface
Direction	m	ft	Surface
07/25	500	1,640	grass
- Sources: GCM Google Maps

Cayana Airstrip (IATA: AAJ, ICAO: SMCA) is an airstrip serving the villages around Kajana in the Sipaliwini District of Suriname. The runway is just west of Kajana, across the Suriname River.

== Airlines and destinations ==
Airlines serving this airport are:

Airlines	Destinations
Blue Wing Airlines	Charter: Paramaribo–Zorg en Hoop
Gum Air	Charter: Paramaribo–Zorg en Hoop
Hi-Jet Helicopter Services	Charter: Paramaribo–Zorg en Hoop
United Air Services	Charter: Paramaribo–Zorg en Hoop
Vortex Aviation Suriname	Charter: Paramaribo–Zorg en Hoop

== Accidents and incidents ==
- On June 18, 1982, Cessna U206G (PZ-TAC) from Gonini Air Service was damaged at the Cayana airstrip. The pilot was Mr. Kuiper, who escaped serious injuries.

== See also ==
- List of airports in Suriname
- Transport in Suriname
