= Poeketi Airstrip =

- IATA: none; ICAO: SMPE

Summary
- Airport type: Public
- Operator: Luchtvaartdienst Suriname
- Location: Poeketi, Suriname
- Elevation AMSL: 265 ft / 81 m
- Coordinates: 4°07′35″N 54°37′25″W

Map
- Location in Suriname

Runways
Direction	Length		Surface
Direction	m	ft	Surface
14/32	520	1,706	Concrete
- GCM Google Maps

Poeketi Airstrip (ICAO: SMPE) is an airstrip serving Poeketi, Suriname.

== Charter airlines and destinations ==
Charter airlines serving this airport are:

Airlines	Destinations
Blue Wing Airlines	Charter: Paramaribo–Zorg en Hoop
Gum Air	Charter: Paramaribo–Zorg en Hoop
Hi-Jet Helicopter Services	Charter: Paramaribo–Zorg en Hoop

== See also ==
- List of airports in Suriname
- Transport in Suriname
