= Sarakreek Airstrip =

- IATA: none; ICAO: SMSK

Summary
- Airport type: Public / Military
- Operator: Luchtvaartdienst Suriname
- Location: Sarakreek, Suriname
- Elevation AMSL: 223 ft / 68 m
- Coordinates: 4°19′10″N 54°58′00″W

Map
- Location of the airport in Suriname

Runways
Direction	Length		Surface
Direction	m	ft	Surface
06/24	560	1,837	Grass
- Sources: Bing Maps HERE Maps

Sarakreek Airstrip (ICAO: SMSK) is an airstrip serving the gold mining community of Sarakreek, in the Brokopondo District of Suriname.

== Charters and destinations ==
Charter airlines serving this airport are:

Airlines	Destinations
Blue Wing Airlines	Charter: Paramaribo–Zorg en Hoop
Gum Air	Charter: Paramaribo–Zorg en Hoop
Hi-Jet Helicopter Services	Charter: Paramaribo–Zorg en Hoop

== See also ==
- List of airports in Suriname
- Transport in Suriname
