= Njoeng Jacob Kondre Airstrip =

Airport in Suriname

- IATA: none; ICAO: SMJK

Summary
- Airport type: Public
- Operator: Luchtvaartdienst Suriname
- Location: Njoeng Jacob Kondre, Suriname
- Elevation AMSL: 82 ft / 25 m
- Coordinates: 04°56′09″N 55°32′05″W

Map
- Location in Suriname

Runways
| Direction | Length | | Surface |
| Direction | m | ft | Surface |
|---|---|---|---|
| 12/30 | 490 | 1,608 | Grass |
- Sources: GCM Google Maps

Njoeng Jacob Kondre Airstrip (ICAO: SMJK) is an airstrip serving Njoeng Jacob Kondre, Suriname.

== Charters and destinations ==
Charter airlines serving this airport are:

| Airlines | Destinations |
|---|---|
| Blue Wing Airlines | Charter: Paramaribo–Zorg en Hoop |
| Gum Air | Charter: Paramaribo–Zorg en Hoop |
| Hi-Jet Helicopter Services | Charter: Paramaribo–Zorg en Hoop |

== Accidents or incidents ==
- (Suriname) On 10 February 2001, Gum Air’s GAF Nomad N24A, registered PZ-TBP was written off when it crashed on a flight from Paramaribo – Zanderij Johan Adolf Pengel International Airport PBM/SMJP to Njoeng Jacob Kondre Airstrip (IATA: SMJK). The Nomad plane had fallen out of radio contact, and personnel at the airstrip in Jacob Kondre said it was flying low and crashed into a mountain. All 9 passengers plus the pilot perished.

== See also ==
- List of airports in Suriname
- Transport in Suriname
