= Matapi =

Matapi may refer to:

- Matapi, a long funnel shaped basked used to extract liquid from cassava in Jamaican cuisine
- Matapi, a populated place in Suriname near the Raghoebarsing Airstrip
- Matapi River in Brazil, a tributary to the Amazon River
- Matapi language, language spoken by the Matapi people of South America
- Matapi flats, apartment complex in Mbare, Zimbabwe
