= Apetina Airstrip =

Apetina Airstrip Apetina Kondre Airstrip
- IATA: none; ICAO: SMPT

Summary
- Airport type: Public
- Operator: Luchtvaartdienst Suriname
- Location: Apetina, Suriname
- Coordinates: 3°30′10″N 55°03′30″W

Map
- Location in Suriname

Runways
Direction	Length		Surface
Direction	m	ft	Surface
09/27	430	1,411	Grass
- Sources: GCM HERE Maps

Apetina Airstrip (ICAO: SMPT) is an airstrip near the village Apetina in Suriname.

== Airlines and destinations ==
Airlines serving this airport are:

Airlines	Destinations
Blue Wing Airlines	Charter: Paramaribo–Zorg en Hoop
Gum Air	Charter: Paramaribo–Zorg en Hoop
Hi-Jet Helicopter Services	Charter: Paramaribo–Zorg en Hoop
United Air Services	Charter: Paramaribo–Zorg en Hoop
Vortex Aviation Suriname	Charter: Paramaribo–Zorg en Hoop

== Accidents and incidents ==
- On 25 September 1986 a Cessna U206G Stationair 6, registration PZ-TAC from Gonini Air Service was hijacked at Apetina kondre airstrip by rebels of the "Jungle Commando" of Ronnie Brunswijk. The pilot (O. van Amson jr.) was forced to fly the aircraft to an unknown location. In May 1988 the airplane was at the Botopasi Airstrip in Suriname with a flat tire; apparently at that time in use by the jungle commando. The aircraft never returned to the owner and was canceled from the Surinamese Aviation register in 1993.

== See also ==
- List of airports in Suriname
- Transport in Suriname
