= Lawa Cottica Airstrip =

Airstrip in Suriname

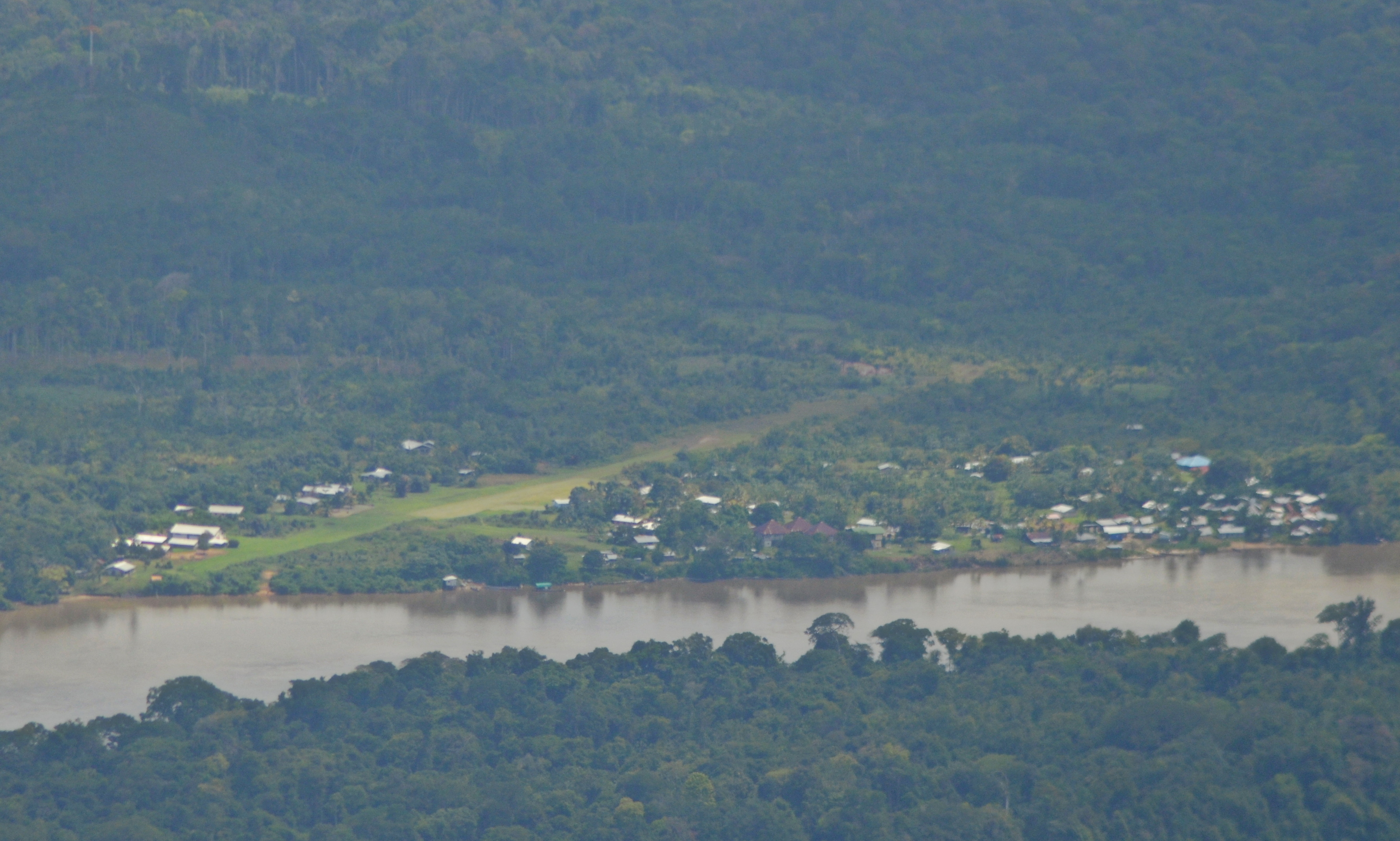
- IATA: none; ICAO: SMCT

Summary
- Airport type: Public
- Operator: Luchtvaartdienst Suriname
- Serves: Cottica, Suriname
- Elevation AMSL: 330 ft / 101 m
- Coordinates: 3°51′08″N 54°13′42″W

Map
- Location in Suriname

Runways
Direction	Length		Surface
Direction	m	ft	Surface
08/26	1,010	3,314	Grass
- Sources: GCM Bing Maps

Lawa Cottica Airstrip (ICAO: SMCT), is an airstrip serving Cottica, Suriname. Cottica is on the Lawa River, which forms part of the eastern border of Suriname.

== Charters and destinations ==
Charter airlines serving this airport are as follows:

Airlines	Destinations
Blue Wing Airlines	Charter: Paramaribo–Zorg en Hoop
Gum Air	Charter: Paramaribo–Zorg en Hoop
Hi-Jet Helicopter Services	Charter: Paramaribo–Zorg en Hoop
United Air Services	Charter: Paramaribo–Zorg en Hoop
Vortex Aviation Suriname	Charter: Paramaribo–Zorg en Hoop

== See also ==
- List of airports in Suriname
- Transport in Suriname
