= Drietabbetje Airstrip =

- IATA: DRJ; ICAO: SMDA

Summary
- Airport type: Public
- Operator: Luchtvaartdienst Suriname
- Location: Drietabbetje, Sipaliwini District, Suriname
- Elevation AMSL: 236 ft (72 m)
- Coordinates: 4°06′40″N 54°40′22″W

Map
- Location in Suriname

Runways
Direction	Length		Surface
Direction	m	ft	Surface
04/22	530	1,739	Grass
- Sources: GCM Bing Maps

Drietabbetje Airstrip (IATA: DRJ, ICAO: SMDA) serves the Tapanahony River village of Drietabbetje, Suriname. The river breaks into braided channels at Drietabbetje, and the airstrip is on one of the larger islands.

== Charter airlines and destinations ==
Airlines	Destinations
Blue Wing Airlines	Charter: Paramaribo–Zorg en Hoop
Gum Air	Scheduled: Paramaribo–Zorg en Hoop

The school building of Drietabbetje right next to the Airstrip

== See also ==
- List of airports in Suriname
- Transport in Suriname
