= Tepoe Airstrip =

Airport serving Pelelu Tepu, Suriname

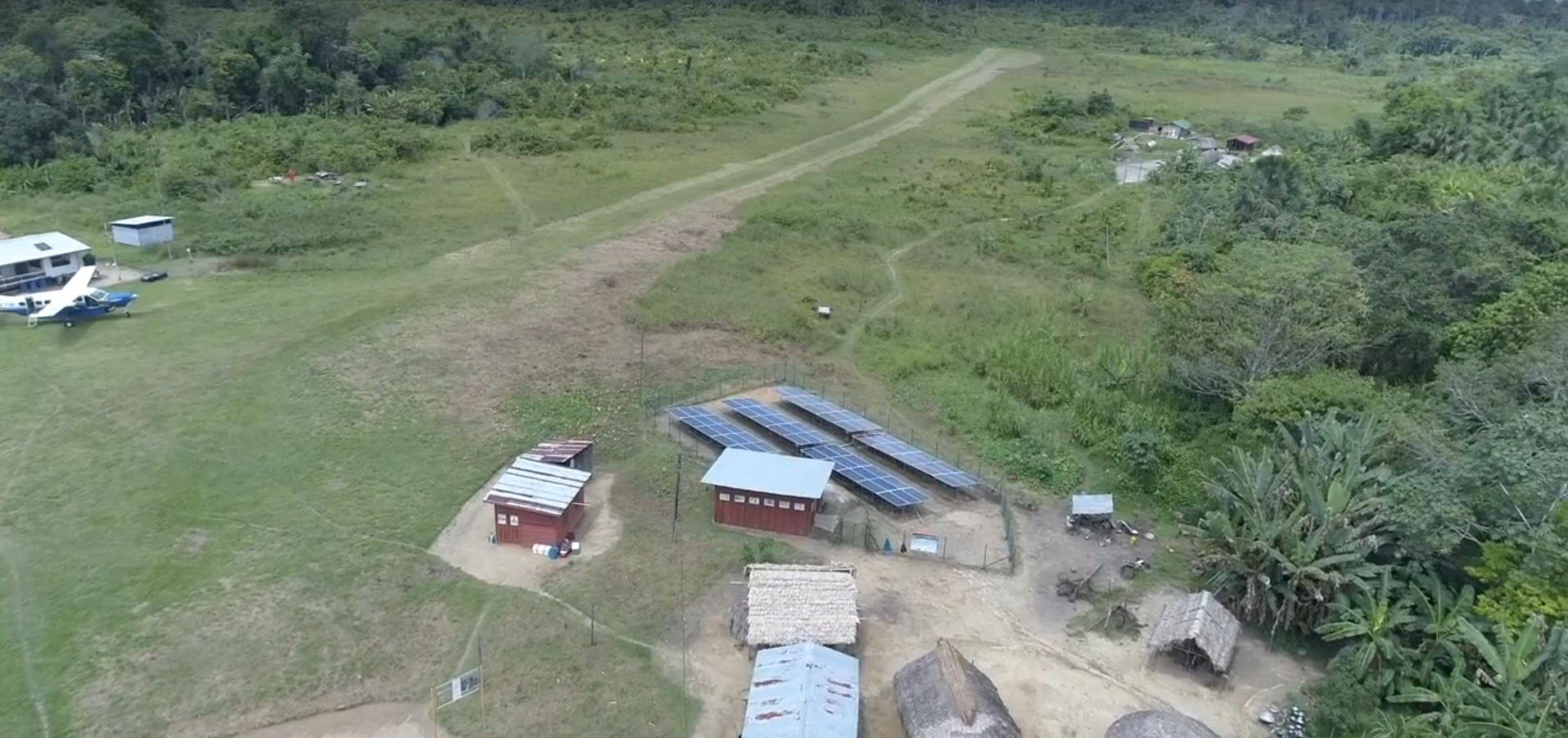
- Tepoe Airstrip
- IATA: KCB; ICAO: SMTP

Summary
- Airport type: Public
- Operator: Luchtvaartdienst Suriname
- Serves: Pelelu Tepu
- Elevation AMSL: 596 ft (182 m)
- Coordinates: 3°09′25″N 55°42′58″W

Map
- Location in Suriname

Runways
Direction	Length		Surface
Direction	m	ft	Surface
16/34	720	2,362	Grass
- Sources: GCM Bing Maps

Tepoe Airstrip (IATA: KCB, ICAO: SMTP) is an airstrip serving Pelelu Tepu, Suriname. The runway extends southwest from the village.

== Charters and destinations ==
Charter airlines serving this airport are:

Airlines	Destinations
Blue Wing Airlines	Charter: Paramaribo–Zorg en Hoop
Gum Air	Charter: Paramaribo–Zorg en Hoop
Hi-Jet Helicopter Services	Charter: Paramaribo–Zorg en Hoop

== See also ==
- List of airports in Suriname
- Transport in Suriname
