= Lawa Tabiki Airstrip =

Airstrip in Suriname

- IATA: none; ICAO: SMTA

Summary
- Airport type: Public
- Operator: Luchtvaartdienst Suriname
- Serves: Benzdorp
- Elevation AMSL: 309 ft / 94 m
- Coordinates: 3°40′45″N 54°05′07″W

Map
- Location in Suriname

Runways
Direction	Length		Surface
Direction	m	ft	Surface
02/20	540	1,772	Grass
- Sources: Bing Maps

Lawa Tabiki Airstrip (ICAO: SMTA) is a small airstrip serving Benzdorp, Suriname. The runway is on an island in the Lawa River, which forms the border between Suriname and French Guiana.

== Charters and destinations ==
Charter airlines serving this airport are:

Airlines	Destinations
Blue Wing Airlines	Charter: Paramaribo–Zorg en Hoop
Gum Air	Charter: Paramaribo–Zorg en Hoop
Hi-Jet Helicopter Services	Charter: Paramaribo–Zorg en Hoop

== See also ==
- List of airports in Suriname
- Transport in Suriname
