= Cabana Airstrip =

Airstrip in Suriname

- IATA: none; ICAO: SMCB

Summary
- Airport type: Public
- Operator: Luchtvaartdienst Suriname
- Location: Cabana, Suriname
- Coordinates: 4°51′10″N 55°35′35″W

Map
- Location in Suriname

Runways
Direction	Length		Surface
Direction	m	ft	Surface
08/26	665	2,182	Grass
- Sources: Google Maps

Cabana Airstrip (ICAO: SMCB) is an airstrip located near Cabana and Heidoti in Suriname. The airstrip provides access to the Saramacca Development Project of IAMGOLD.

== Charters and destinations ==
Charter airlines serving this airport are:

Airlines	Destinations
Blue Wing Airlines	Charter: Paramaribo–Zorg en Hoop
Gum Air	Charter: Paramaribo–Zorg en Hoop
Hi-Jet Helicopter Services	Charter: Paramaribo–Zorg en Hoop
United Air Services	Charter: Paramaribo–Zorg en Hoop
Vortex Aviation Suriname	Charter: Paramaribo–Zorg en Hoop

== See also ==
- List of airports in Suriname
- Transport in Suriname
