= Wageningen Airstrip =

- IATA: AGI; ICAO: SMWA

Summary
- Airport type: Public
- Operator: Luchtvaartdienst Suriname
- Location: Wageningen, Suriname
- Elevation AMSL: 6 ft / 2 m
- Coordinates: 5°50′30″N 56°40′15″W

Map
- Location in Suriname

Runways
Direction	Length		Surface
Direction	m	ft	Surface
09/27	950	3,117	Asphalt, grass
- Sources: GCM Bing Maps

Wageningen Airstrip (IATA: AGI, ICAO: SMWA) is 8 kilometres (5.0 mi) north of Wageningen, in the Nickerie District of Suriname. Heavily used for cropdusting agriculture flights in this rice region of the country. Homebase of the Surinam Sky Farmers

== Airlines and destinations ==
Airlines, Charter & Crop dusting companies serving this airport are:

Airlines	Destinations
Blue Wing Airlines	Charter: Paramaribo–Zorg en Hoop
Gum Air	Charter: Paramaribo–Zorg en Hoop
Pegasus Air Services	Charter: Paramaribo–Zorg en Hoop
Vortex Aviation Suriname	Charter: Paramaribo–Zorg en Hoop
Surinam Sky Farmers	Cropdusting: Nickerie
Overeem Air Service	Cropdusting: Nickerie
Coronie Aero Farming	Cropdusting: Nickerie
ERK Farms	Cropdusting: Nickerie
Eagle Air Services	Cropdusting: Nickerie

== See also ==
- List of airports in Suriname
- Transport in Suriname
