= Major Henk Fernandes Airport =

Major Henk Fernandes Airport Nieuw Nickerie Airport
- IATA: ICK; ICAO: SMNI

Summary
- Airport type: Public
- Operator: Luchtvaartdienst Suriname
- Location: Nieuw Nickerie, Suriname
- Elevation AMSL: 10 ft (3.0 m)
- Coordinates: 05°57′20″N 57°02′25″W

Map
- Location in Suriname

Runways
Direction	Length		Surface
Direction	m	ft	Surface
08/26	700	2,297	Asphalt
- Sources: GCM

Major Henk Fernandes Airport (Dutch: Majoor Henk Fernandes Vliegveld) (IATA: ICK, ICAO: SMNI), also known as Nieuw Nickerie Airport, is near Nieuw Nickerie, the capital city of the Nickerie district in Suriname. This is one of the oldest airports in Suriname, in use since 1953, when the Piper Cub (PZ-NAC) of Kappel-van Eyck named "Colibri" landed there from Zorg en Hoop Airport.

The airport is named after army Major Henk Fernandes, who perished in a helicopter crash in 1982. It was in fact the first aircraft of the Air Force of the young independent nation of Suriname, the Hughes 500 - Model 369D helicopter, used for patrolling missions, in March of that year, killing all five crewmembers aboard at the time (Major Henk Fernandes, second lieutenant Norman de Miranda, soldier Tjon a Kon and soldier Kowid and American pilot Foster Ford). Battalion commander Major Henk Fernandes, had previous been appointed to replace Sergeant Laurens Neede as Minister of Army and Police in 1982. However the crash occurred before the inauguration of the then new twelve ministers cabinet of Suriname under Prime Minister Henry Neijhorst.

In 2018 Surinamese Minister Patrick Pengel of Public Works Transport & Communication closed the control tower of the Major H. Fernandes airport in Nickerie. The reason for this decision was that the tower is currently in a very deplorable state. Although he was very impressed with the way air traffic controllers did their job despite these difficult circumstances. But it could not go on like this. In May 2019 Sanjay Ramsamoedj, chairman of the Eastern Council in the Nickerie district, pleaded for a complete rehabilitation of the Major Henry Fernandes Airport in Zeedijk. As a border district, Nickerie must prepare to respond to the developments that are underway in Guyana. Ramsamoedj expects the tourism sector to grow as well. According to district commissioner Nisha Kurban-Baboe, Vijay Chotkan, the new minister of Public Works, Transport and Communications, indicated during a meeting with all DCs that all airports in Suriname will be addressed. She thinks that Zeedijk airport will also be rehabilitated in that context.

== Charters and destinations ==
Charter Airlines & Crop Dusting companies serving this airport are:

Airlines	Destinations
Blue Wing Airlines	Charter: Paramaribo–Zorg en Hoop
Gum Air	Charter: Paramaribo–Zorg en Hoop

== See also ==
- List of airports in Suriname
- Transport in Suriname
