= Kwamelasemoetoe Airstrip =

- IATA: none; ICAO: SMSM

Summary
- Airport type: Public
- Operator: Luchtvaartdienst Suriname
- Location: Kwamelasemoetoe, Suriname
- Elevation AMSL: 905 ft / 276 m
- Coordinates: 2°21′15″N 56°47′35″W

Map
- Location in Suriname

Runways
Direction	Length		Surface
Direction	m	ft	Surface
10/28	750	2,461	Grass
- Sources: GCM Google Maps

Kwamelasemoetoe Airstrip (IATA: SMSM) is an airport serving Kwamelasemoetoe, Suriname, a Trio Indian village in the south of Suriname in the Sipaliwini District. The name of the village means bamboo sand, named after nearby Sipaliwini River banks partly overgrown with bamboo.

Kwamelasemoetoe is just east of the Tigri Area (in light grey on the map), a triangular section of land disputed with Guyana.

== Charters and destinations ==
Charter airlines serving this airport are:

Airlines	Destinations
Blue Wing Airlines	Charter: Paramaribo–Zorg en Hoop
Gum Air	Charter: Paramaribo–Zorg en Hoop
Hi-Jet Helicopter Services	Charter: Paramaribo–Zorg en Hoop

== Accidents and incidents ==
- (Suriname) On 15 October 2009, an Antonov An-28 of Blue Wing Airlines, registered PZ-TST, departed the runway on landing and hit an obstacle. The aircraft was substantially damaged and four people were injured, one seriously.

== See also ==
- List of airports in Suriname
- Transport in Suriname
