= Bakhuys Airstrip =

- IATA: none; ICAO: SMBG

Summary
- Airport type: Public
- Operator: Luchtvaartdienst Suriname
- Location: Bakhuis Gebergte, Suriname
- Elevation AMSL: 307 ft (94 m)
- Coordinates: 04°46′45″N 56°46′05″W

Map
- Location in Suriname

Runways
| Direction | Length | | Surface |
| Direction | m | ft | Surface |
|---|---|---|---|
| 07/25 | 660 | 2,165 | Dirt |
- Sources: Bing Maps OpenStreetMap

Bakhuys Airstrip (ICAO: SMBG) is an airstrip near the village of Bakhuys and the Bakhuis Mountains (Bakhuis Gebergte) in Suriname. There is rising terrain to the south.

== Charters and destinations ==
Charter airlines serving this airport are:

| Airlines | Destinations |
|---|---|
| Blue Wing Airlines | Charter: Paramaribo–Zorg en Hoop |
| Gum Air | Charter: Paramaribo–Zorg en Hoop |
| Hi-Jet Helicopter Services | Charter: Paramaribo–Zorg en Hoop |
| United Air Services | Charter: Paramaribo–Zorg en Hoop |
| Vortex Aviation Suriname | Charter: Paramaribo–Zorg en Hoop |

== See also ==
- List of airports in Suriname
- Transport in Suriname
