= Albina Airstrip =

- IATA: ABN; ICAO: SMBN

Summary
- Airport type: Public
- Operator: Luchtvaartdienst Suriname
- Location: Albina, Suriname
- Elevation AMSL: 21 ft / 6 m
- Coordinates: 5°30′50″N 54°03′00″W

Map
- Location in Suriname

Runways
Direction	Length		Surface
Direction	m	ft	Surface
04/22	760	2,493	Grass
- Sources: GCM Google Maps

Albina Airstrip (IATA: ABN, ICAO: SMBN) was an airport serving Albina, the capital of the Marowijne District of Suriname. It was one of the oldest airports in Suriname, in use from 1953, when the Piper Cub (PZ-NAC) of Kappel-van Eyck named "Colibri" landed there from Zorg en Hoop Airport until 2025 when it permanently closed. The reason for closure was never released and there are no records of the exact date either.

The St Laurent du Maroni non-directional beacon (Ident: CW) is located 5 kilometres (3.1 mi) south of the runway, across the Maroni River in French Guiana.

== Airlines and destinations ==
Airlines serving this airport were:

Airlines	Destinations
Blue Wing Airlines	Charter: Paramaribo–Zorg en Hoop
Gum Air	Charter: Paramaribo–Zorg en Hoop
Pegasus Air Services	Charter: Paramaribo–Zorg en Hoop
United Air Services	Charter: Paramaribo–Zorg en Hoop
Vortex Aviation Suriname	Charter: Paramaribo–Zorg en Hoop

== See also ==
- List of airports in Suriname
- Transport in Suriname
