= Käyser Airstrip =

Käyser Airstrip Eilerts de Haan Airstrip / Jan Gouka Airstrip
- IATA: none; ICAO: SMKE

Summary
- Airport type: Public
- Operator: Luchtvaartdienst Suriname
- Location: Käyser Mountains, Suriname
- Elevation AMSL: 849 ft (259 m)
- Coordinates: 3°05′35″N 56°28′25″W

Map
- Location in Suriname

Runways
Direction	Length		Surface
Direction	m	ft	Surface
11/29	1,150	3,773	grass
- Sources: GCM Google Maps

Käyser Airstrip, also Käyser Jan Gouka Airstrip (ICAO: SMKE) is near the Käyser Mountains range in Sipaliwini District, Suriname. It was constructed as part of Operation Grasshopper ( a project to look for natural resources) and has one long grass runway. Fishing and wildlife tours are prime users of the airstrip.

== History ==
The runway was laid out in the framework of Operation Grasshopper and is located on the Zuid River (branch of the Lucie River) near the Käyser Mountains, named after the explorer Conrad Carel Käyser. In July 1959 under the direction of Dirk Geijskes an expedition began in preparation for the airports at the Coeroeni River and the Käyser Mountains. In December 1960, Käyser Airstrip opened up for public air traffic in Suriname. On 25 October 1968 a KLM Aerocarto C-47A registered PH-DAA flew into Tafelberg Mountain, Suriname, following an engine failure while on a survey flight. The aircraft collided with the mountain in cloudy conditions, killing three of the five people on board. In memory of the deceased Captain Jan Gouka, the Käyser Airstrip was named after him.

== Airlines and destinations ==
Currently, no scheduled airlines are offered from Käyser Jan Gouka Airstrip.

=== Charter ===
Charter airlines serving this airport are:

Airlines	Destinations
Blue Wing Airlines	Charter: Paramaribo–Zorg en Hoop
Gum Air	Charter: Paramaribo–Zorg en Hoop
Hi-Jet Helicopter Services	Charter: Paramaribo–Zorg en Hoop

== See also ==
- List of airports in Suriname
- Transport in Suriname
