= Djumu Airstrip =

Airport in Suriname

Djumu Airstrip Djoemoe Airstrip
- IATA: DOE; ICAO: SMDJ

Summary
- Airport type: Public
- Operator: Luchtvaartdienst Suriname
- Location: Djumu, Suriname
- Elevation AMSL: 290 ft / 88 m
- Coordinates: 4°00′25″N 55°28′50″W

Map
- Location in Suriname

Runways
Direction	Length		Surface
Direction	m	ft	Surface
05/23	600	1,969	asphalt
- Sources: GCM

Djumu Airstrip (IATA: DOE, ICAO: SMDJ), (locally called Djoemoe Airstrip) is an airstrip serving Djumu, Suriname.

== Airlines and destinations ==
Airlines serving this airport are:

Airlines	Destinations
Blue Wing Airlines	Charter: Paramaribo–Zorg en Hoop
Gum Air	Charter: Paramaribo–Zorg en Hoop
Hi-Jet Helicopter Services	Charter: Paramaribo–Zorg en Hoop
United Air Services	Charter: Paramaribo–Zorg en Hoop
Vortex Aviation Suriname	Charter: Paramaribo–Zorg en Hoop

== Accidents and incidents ==
- On 29 October 1987 a Cessna U206F (PZ-NAU) was hijacked at the Djumu airstrip, Suriname, by members of the rebellion “Jungle Commando” of Ronnie Brunswijk. The pilot Dan Rogers returned to Paramaribo via French-Guyana after his release. In June 1988 the aircraft was returned to the MAF (Mission Aviation Fellowship) Suriname after mediation of MAF Headquarters in California, USA and French Guiana.

== See also ==
- List of airports in Suriname
- Transport in Suriname
