= Langatabbetje Airstrip =

Airport in Langatabiki, Suriname

Langatabbetje Airstrip Langatabiki
- IATA: none; ICAO: SMLT

Summary
- Airport type: Public
- Operator: Luchtvaartdienst Suriname
- Location: Langatabbetje, Suriname
- Elevation AMSL: 33 ft / 10 m
- Coordinates: 4°59′46″N 54°26′30″W

Map
- Location in Suriname

Runways
Direction	Length		Surface
Direction	m	ft	Surface
04/22	500	1,640	Asphalt
- Sources: GCM Google Maps

Langatabbetje Airstrip (IATA: SMLT), is an airport on Langatabbetje island in the Moroni River, Suriname.

== Charters and destinations ==
Charter airlines serving this airport are:

Airlines	Destinations
Blue Wing Airlines	Charter: Paramaribo–Zorg en Hoop
Gum Air	Charter: Paramaribo–Zorg en Hoop
Hi-Jet Helicopter Services	Charter: Paramaribo–Zorg en Hoop

== See also ==
- List of airports in Suriname
- Transport in Suriname
