= Laduani Airstrip =

Airport in Aurora, Suriname

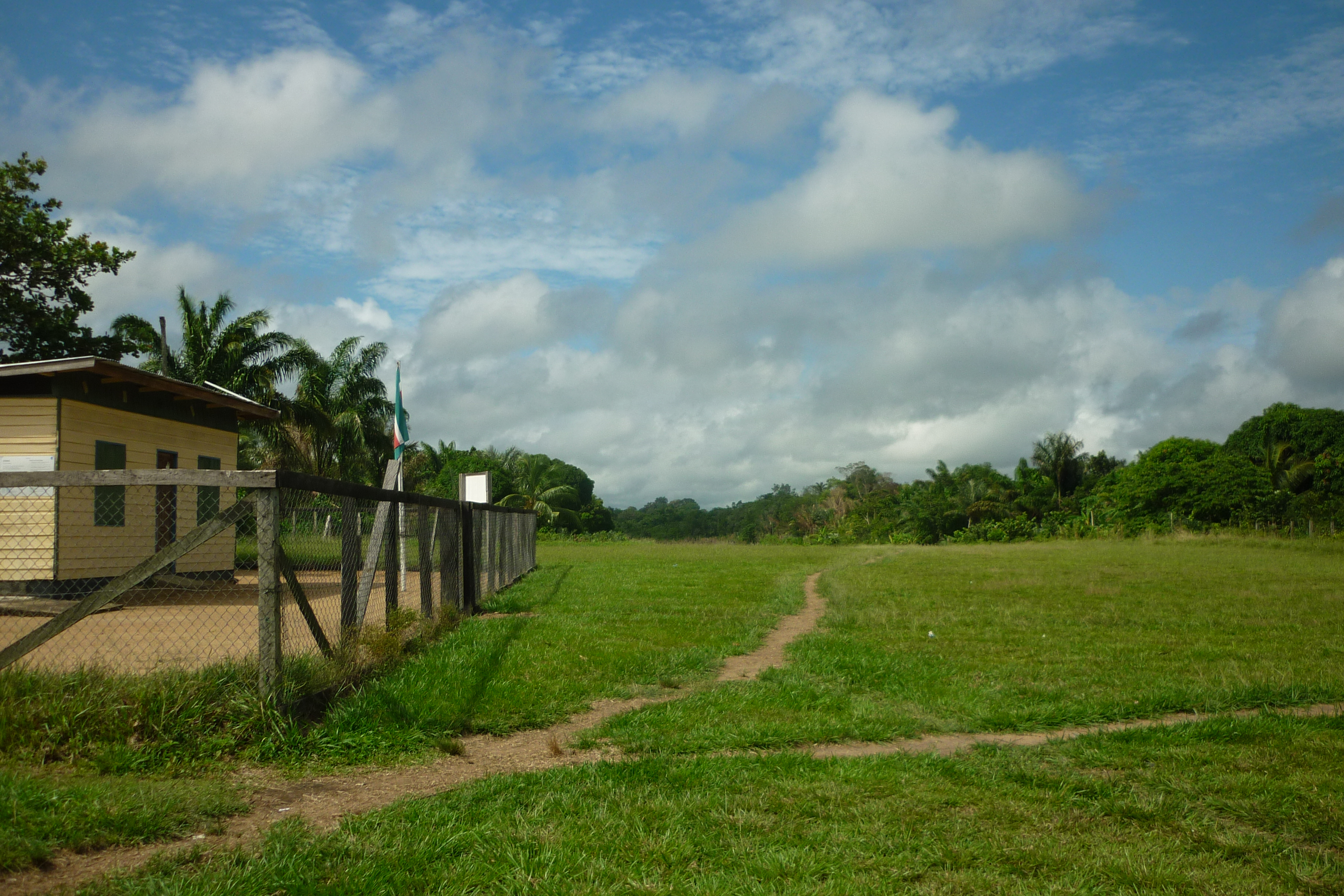
- IATA: LDO; ICAO: SMDO

Summary
- Airport type: Public
- Operator: Luchtvaartdienst Suriname
- Serves: Aurora
- Elevation AMSL: 236 ft / 72 m
- Coordinates: 4°22′35″N 55°24′20″W

Map
- Location in Suriname

Runways
Direction	Length		Surface
Direction	m	ft	Surface
09/27	550	1,804	grass
- GCM Google Maps

Laduani Airstrip (IATA: LDO, ICAO: SMDO), is an airport serving Aurora, Suriname.

== Charters and destinations ==
Charter airlines serving this airport are:

Airlines	Destinations
Blue Wing Airlines	Charter: Paramaribo–Zorg en Hoop
Gum Air	Charter: Paramaribo–Zorg en Hoop
Hi-Jet Helicopter Services	Charter: Paramaribo–Zorg en Hoop

== See also ==
- List of airports in Suriname
- Transport in Suriname
