= Coeroenie Airstrip =

Coeroeni Airstrip
- IATA: none; ICAO: SMCI

Summary
- Airport type: Public
- Operator: Luchtvaartdienst Suriname
- Location: Coeroeni, Suriname
- Elevation AMSL: 479 ft / 146 m
- Coordinates: 3°22′15″N 57°20′45″W

Map
- Location in Suriname

Runways
Direction	Length		Surface
Direction	m	ft	Surface
11/29	1,230	4,035	Grass
- Sources: GCM Google Maps

Coeroeni Airstrip (ICAO: SMCI) is an airstrip located near Kuruni (variant spellings: Coeroeni, Coeroenie, or Curuni) in Suriname. It was constructed as part of Operation Grasshopper. The Airstrip is in the vicinity of the disputed border area between Guyana and Suriname called the Tigri Area.

== History ==
In 1959, the Coeroenie Airstrip was constructed as part of operation Grasshopper, to access the interior, and to map mineral resources. In 1965, a camp was constructed near the airstrip to house workers for a planned weir.

== Charters and destinations ==
Charter airlines serving this airport are:

Airlines	Destinations
Blue Wing Airlines	Charter: Paramaribo–Zorg en Hoop
Gum Air	Charter: Paramaribo–Zorg en Hoop
Hi-Jet Helicopter Services	Charter: Paramaribo–Zorg en Hoop
United Air Services	Charter: Paramaribo–Zorg en Hoop
Vortex Aviation Suriname	Charter: Paramaribo–Zorg en Hoop

== Accidents and incidents ==
- On 2 September 1960 a Cessna Bobcat UC-78C Bobcat, registration PZ-TAE from the Surinaamse Luchtvaart Maatschappij crashed at Curuni. There were no fatalities or injuries, the pilot was M. Wybenga.

== See also ==
- List of airports in Suriname
- Transport in Suriname
