= Stoelmans Eiland Airstrip =

- IATA: SMZ; ICAO: SMST

Summary
- Airport type: Public
- Operator: Luchtvaartdienst Suriname
- Location: Stoelmanseiland, Suriname
- Elevation AMSL: 187 ft (57 m)
- Coordinates: 4°21′05″N 54°25′05″W

Map
- Location in Suriname

Runways
Direction	Length		Surface
Direction	m	ft	Surface
10/28	500	1,640	grass
- Sources: GCM Google Maps

Stoelmans Eiland Airstrip (IATA: SMZ, ICAO: SMST) is an airstrip serving Stoelmanseiland, an island on the eastern border of Suriname.

== Charters and destinations ==
Charter airlines serving this airport are:

Airlines	Destinations
Blue Wing Airlines	Charter: Paramaribo–Zorg en Hoop
Gum Air	Charter: Paramaribo–Zorg en Hoop
Hi-Jet Helicopter Services	Charter: Paramaribo–Zorg en Hoop

== Incidents and Accidents ==
- On 18 October 1986 a De Havilland Canada DHC6-300 Twin Otter from the Surinaamse Luchtvaart Maatschappij, registered PZ-TCD, was hijacked by the Jungle Commando at Stoelmans Eiland, after landing. The airplane had departed Paramaribo, Zorg en Hoop Airport with 4 people on board. Lloyds paid FL 500000 to get the aircraft back. The hijacking lasted less than 1 day, there were 5 hijackers. The same airplane was sold years later, in 2005 to Gum Air, and is still flying in Suriname now registered PZ-TBY.

== See also ==
- List of airports in Suriname
- Transport in Suriname
