= Totness Airstrip =

- IATA: TOT; ICAO: SMCO

Summary
- Airport type: Public
- Operator: Luchtvaartdienst Suriname
- Location: Totness, Suriname
- Elevation AMSL: 10 ft / 3 m
- Coordinates: 5°52′00″N 56°19′40″W

Map
- Location in Suriname

Runways
Direction	Length		Surface
Direction	m	ft	Surface
14/32	500	1,640	Grass
- Sources: GCM Google Maps

Totness Airstrip (IATA: TOT, ICAO: SMCO) is an airport serving Totness, a town in and capital of the Coronie District in Suriname. This is one of the oldest airports in Suriname.

The marked runway is 500 metres (1,600 ft). Including overruns extends it to 700 metres (2,300 ft).

== Charters and destinations ==
Charter services for this airport are:

Airlines	Destinations
Blue Wing Airlines	Charter: Paramaribo–Zorg en Hoop
Gum Air	Charter: Paramaribo–Zorg en Hoop
Hi-Jet Helicopter Services	Charter: Paramaribo–Zorg en Hoop
Coronie Aero Farming	Cropdusting:Coronie
Overeem Air Service	Cropdusting:Coronie

== See also ==
- List of airports in Suriname
- Transport in Suriname
