= SMLA =

SMLA may refer to:

- Lawa Anapaike Airstrip, ICAO code
- Samlaya Junction railway station, station code
- Scott Meredith Literary Agency
