= Moengo Airstrip =

- IATA: MOJ; ICAO: SMMO

Summary
- Airport type: Public
- Operator: Luchtvaartdienst Suriname
- Location: Moengo, Suriname
- Elevation AMSL: 49 ft / 15 m
- Coordinates: 05°36′28″N 54°24′00″W

Map
- Location in Suriname

Runways
Direction	Length		Surface
Direction	m	ft	Surface
09/27	520	1,706	Grass
- Sources: GCM Google Maps

Moengo Airstrip (IATA: MOJ, ICAO: SMMO), is an airport serving Moengo, Suriname.

== Airlines and destinations ==
Airlines serving this airport are:

Airlines	Destinations
Blue Wing Airlines	Charter: Paramaribo–Zorg en Hoop
Gum Air	Charter: Paramaribo–Zorg en Hoop
Hi-Jet Helicopter Services	Charter: Paramaribo–Zorg en Hoop

== See also ==
- List of airports in Suriname
- Transport in Suriname
