= Alalapadu Airstrip =

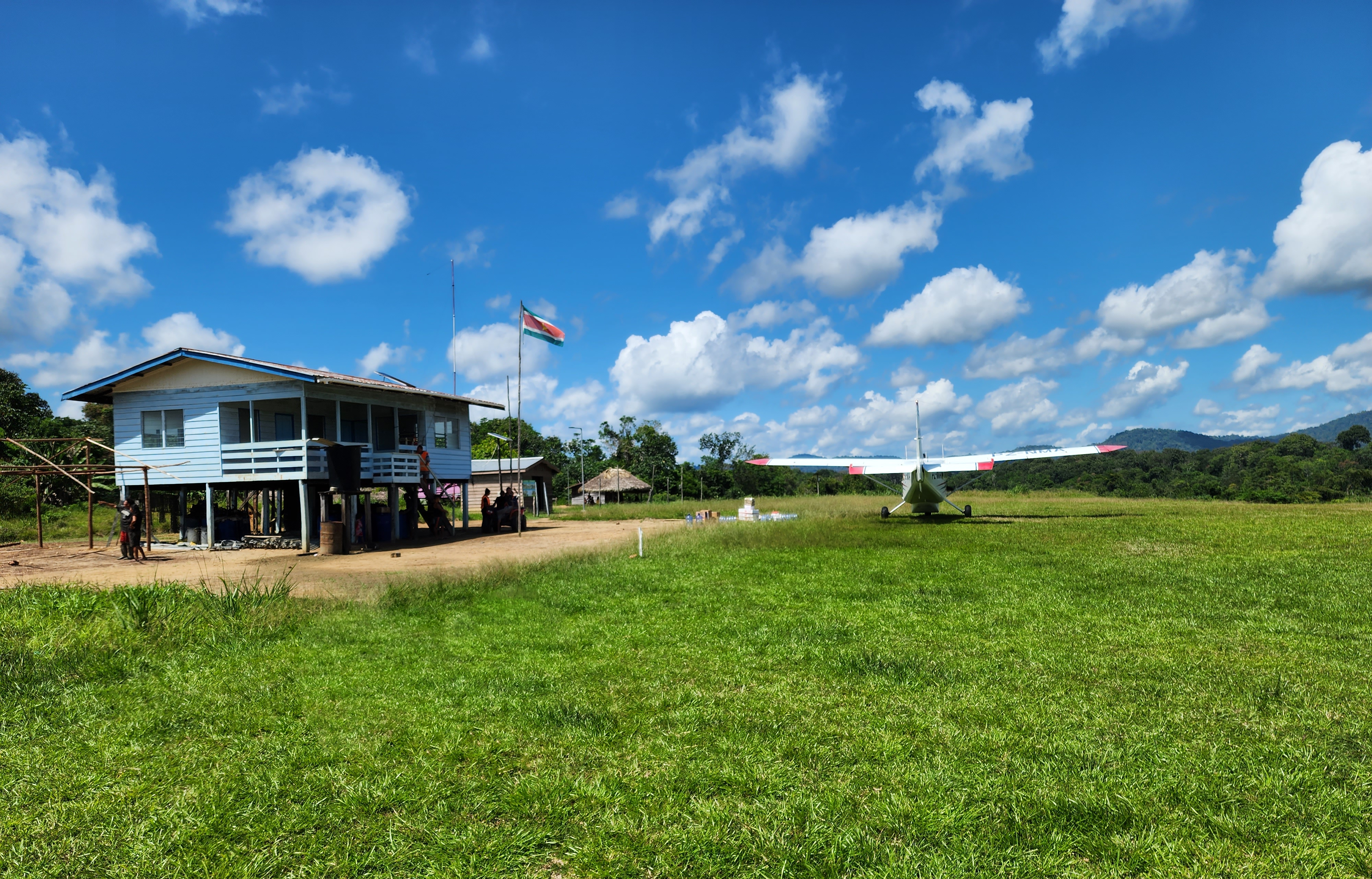
- IATA: none; ICAO: SMDU

Summary
- Airport type: Public
- Operator: Luchtvaartdienst Suriname
- Location: Alalapadu, Suriname
- Elevation AMSL: 880 ft / 268 m
- Coordinates: 2°31′25″N 56°19′30″W

Map
- Location in Suriname

Runways
Direction	Length		Surface
Direction	m	ft	Surface
04/22	600	1,969	Grass
- Rwy length is estimated. Sources: GCM Google Maps

Alalapadu Airstrip (ICAO: SMDU) is an airstrip serving Alalapadu in Suriname.

== Airlines and destinations ==
Airlines flying charters to this airport are:

Airlines	Destinations
Blue Wing Airlines	Charter: Paramaribo–Zorg en Hoop
Gum Air	Charter: Paramaribo–Zorg en Hoop
Pegasus Air Services	Charter: Paramaribo–Zorg en Hoop
United Aviation Services	Charter: Paramaribo–Zorg en Hoop
Vortex Aviation Suriname	Charter: Paramaribo–Zorg en Hoop

== See also ==
- List of airports in Suriname
- Transport in Suriname
