= Poesoegroenoe Airstrip =

- IATA: none; ICAO: SMPG

Summary
- Airport type: Public
- Operator: Luchtvaartdienst Suriname
- Location: Poesoegroenoe, Suriname
- Elevation AMSL: 390 ft / 119 m
- Coordinates: 4°23′52″N 55°47′35″W

Map
- Location in Suriname

Runways
Direction	Length		Surface
Direction	m	ft	Surface
12/30	750	2,461	gravel
- Sources: GCM Google Maps

Poesoegroenoe Airstrip (ICAO: SMPG) serves the village of Poesoegroenoe, in the Sipaliwini District of Suriname.

== Charters and destinations ==
Charter airlines serving this airport are:

Airlines	Destinations
Blue Wing Airlines	Charter: Paramaribo–Zorg en Hoop
Gum Air	Charter: Paramaribo–Zorg en Hoop
Hi-Jet Helicopter Services	Charter: Paramaribo–Zorg en Hoop

== Accidents or incidents ==
- (Suriname) On 21 August 2008 an Overeem Air Service Cessna 207 Skywagon ran off the runway at Poesoegroenoe Airstrip (ICAO: SMPG) during take-off when engine failure occurred. Luckily of the six people on board everyone survived, with only two people minorly injured.

== See also ==
- List of airports in Suriname
- Transport in Suriname
