= Missão Tiriyó =

Village in Pará, Brazil

Missão Tiriyó Tawainen
- Location in Brazil Missão Tiriyó (Brazil)
- Coordinates: 2°13′54″N 55°57′39″W
- Country: Brazil
- State: Pará
- Municipality: Óbidos

Population (2016)
  - Total: 495

Missão Tiriyó, sometimes also known by its native name Tawainen is an Indigenous Tiriyó village situated near the headwaters of the Western Paru River in Brazil, near the border with Suriname. The Surinamese village of Sipaliwini Savanna can be reached by an unpaved path.

== Demographics ==
In June 2016, there were 97 inhabitants of the old mission (Missão Velha), all of whom were Tiriyó. The new mission (Missão Nova) had 398 inhabitants in total, of whom 360 were Tiriyó, 21 were Kaxuyana, and 15 were Aparai.
