= Gross Rosebel Airstrip =

- IATA: none; ICAO: SMGR

Summary
- Airport type: Private
- Operator: Luchtvaartdienst Suriname
- Location: Rosebel Gold Mine, Suriname
- Coordinates: 5°05′30″N 55°14′57″W

Map
- Location in Suriname

Runways
Direction	Length		Surface
Direction	m	ft	Surface
05/23	600	1,969	Gravel
- Sources: Google Maps

Gross Rosebel Airstrip (IATA: SMGR) serves the Gross Rosebel mine, in the Brokopondo District of Suriname. The Rosebel concession owns this airstrip. The airstrip is mostly used for emergencies and charters.

Security personnel are responsible for airstrip maintenance and lighting as well as aircraft scheduling and communication with the Suriname civil aviation authorities. The site communication package is equipped with an air to ground Unicom channel that links into site mobile radios. This provides aircraft with the ability to give notice of arrival and to direct ground vehicles off the runway.

The Rosebel mine is approximately 85 kilometres (53 mi) from the capital city of Paramaribo. The concession covers 170 square kilometres (66 sq mi) and holds six major deposits and numerous gold prospects divided between two distinct limbs. Rosebel is Canadian firm Cambior's most important asset. Rosebel employs 1260 people and has a projected mine life of 12 years (until 2022). However, the exploration potential is still high and it is expected that new mineral reserves will be added in the future.

== Charters and destinations ==
Charter airlines serving this airport are:

Airlines	Destinations
Blue Wing Airlines	Charter: Paramaribo–Zorg en Hoop
Gum Air	Charter: Paramaribo–Zorg en Hoop
Hi-Jet Helicopter Services	Charter: Paramaribo–Zorg en Hoop

== See also ==
- List of airports in Suriname
- Transport in Suriname
