= Kabalebo =

Coordinates: 4°26′20″N 57°11′14″W

- Resort
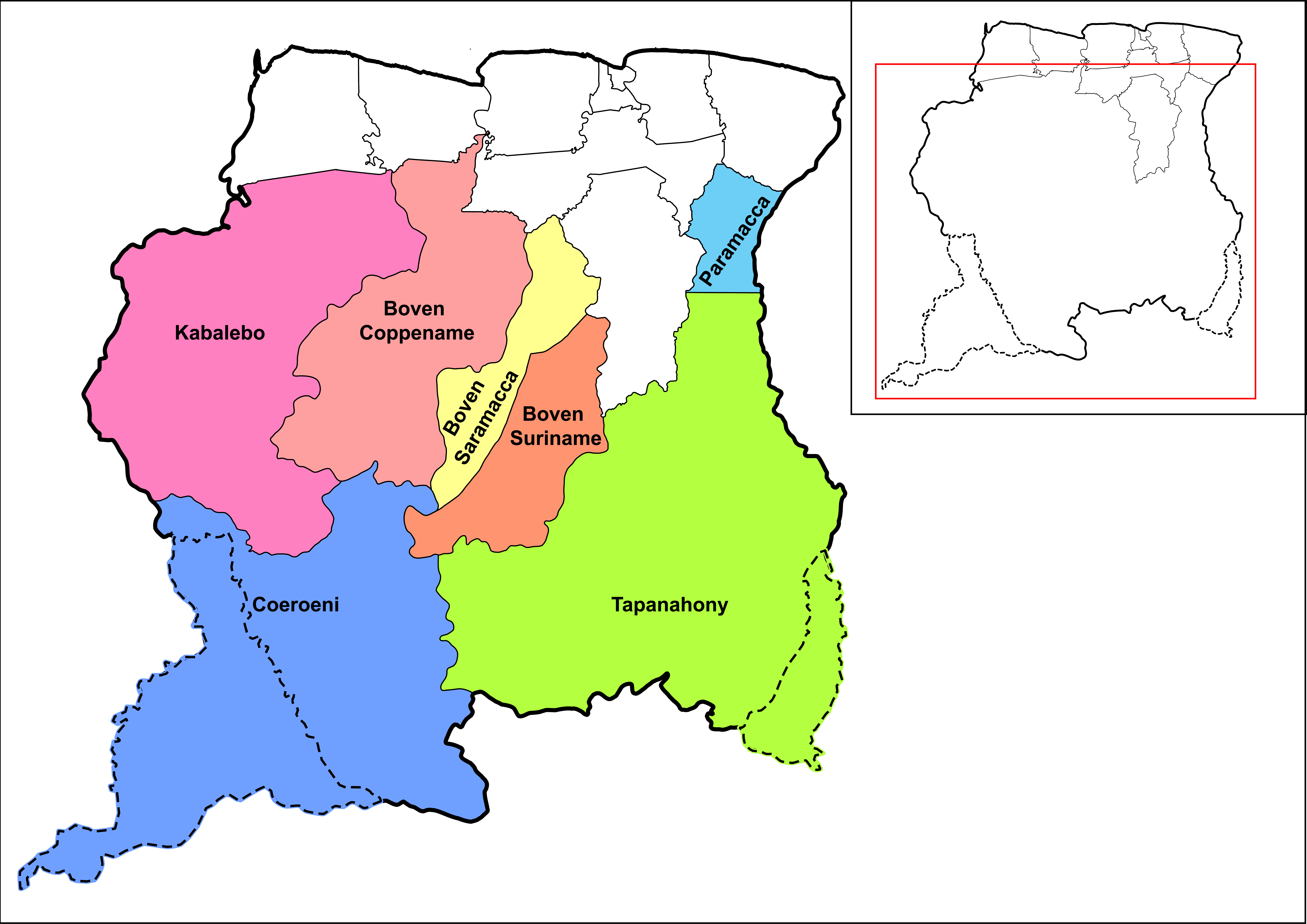
- Map showing the resorts of Sipaliwini District. Kabelebo
- Country: Suriname
- District: Sipaliwini District

Area
  - Total: 25,955 km^{2} (10,021 sq mi)

Population (2012 census)
  - Total: 2,291
  - Density: 0.08827/km^{2} (0.2286/sq mi)
- Time zone: UTC-3 (AST)

Kabalebo is a resort in Suriname, located in the Sipaliwini District. Its population at the 2012 census was 2,291.

== Geography ==
Kabalebo is a resort in Suriname named after the Kabalebo River that flows through this area. Clockwise, the Kabalebo resort borders the Upper Coppename River and resort to the East, it's adjacent to the Coeroeni River and resort in the South, bordered in the North across the Courantyne River to Guyana and also to Nickerie. Kabalebo is an area around the river Kabalebo and it was formerly in the district of Nickerie, but since the re-organisation of the districts it lies in district Sipaliwini. The residents are mainly Indigenous people, the original inhabitants of Suriname. The major tribes are the Lokono and Warao.

The bigger villages in this resort are Apoera (Apura), Bakhuys (Bakhuis), Section and Washabo (Wasjabo). Smaller villages include: Lucie, Sandlanding, and Wanapan. Clinics and schools are located in Apura, and Washabo.

Section is the smallest village and has a population of 116 who according to the chief are all related.

== Economic Development ==
There is little economic activity in Kabalebo, although there have been attempts in the past to change this. There is the bauxite mine in the Bakhuis mountain range with the corresponding (never used and in the meantime declining) railway line to Apoera, and during the reign of Prime Minister Henck Arron (1975-1980), there were plans, part of the West Suriname Plan, to build a dam in Kabalebo for power generation for the benefit of the mining activities. The construction of the reservoir is still considered. A project of permanent agriculture is under way with 100 hectares of American taro, 80 hectares of cassave and 3 hectares of cashew tree.

== Tourist Activity ==
In the Midwest of Suriname, in the middle of the Amazon rain-forest, a jungle-accommodation has been built; the Kabalebo Nature Resort. Kabalebo is also called a bird watching paradise for bird watchers in the jungle.

The Kabalebo Airstrip (ICAO: SMKA), was constructed as part of Operation Grasshopper.
