= Amatopo Airstrip =

- IATA: none; ICAO: SMAM

Summary
- Airport type: Public
- Operator: Luchtvaartdienst Suriname
- Location: Amatopo, Suriname
- Coordinates: 3°32′50″N 57°37′55″W

Map
- Location in Suriname

Runways
Direction	Length		Surface
Direction	m	ft	Surface
12/30	700	2,297	grass
- Sources: GCM HERE Maps

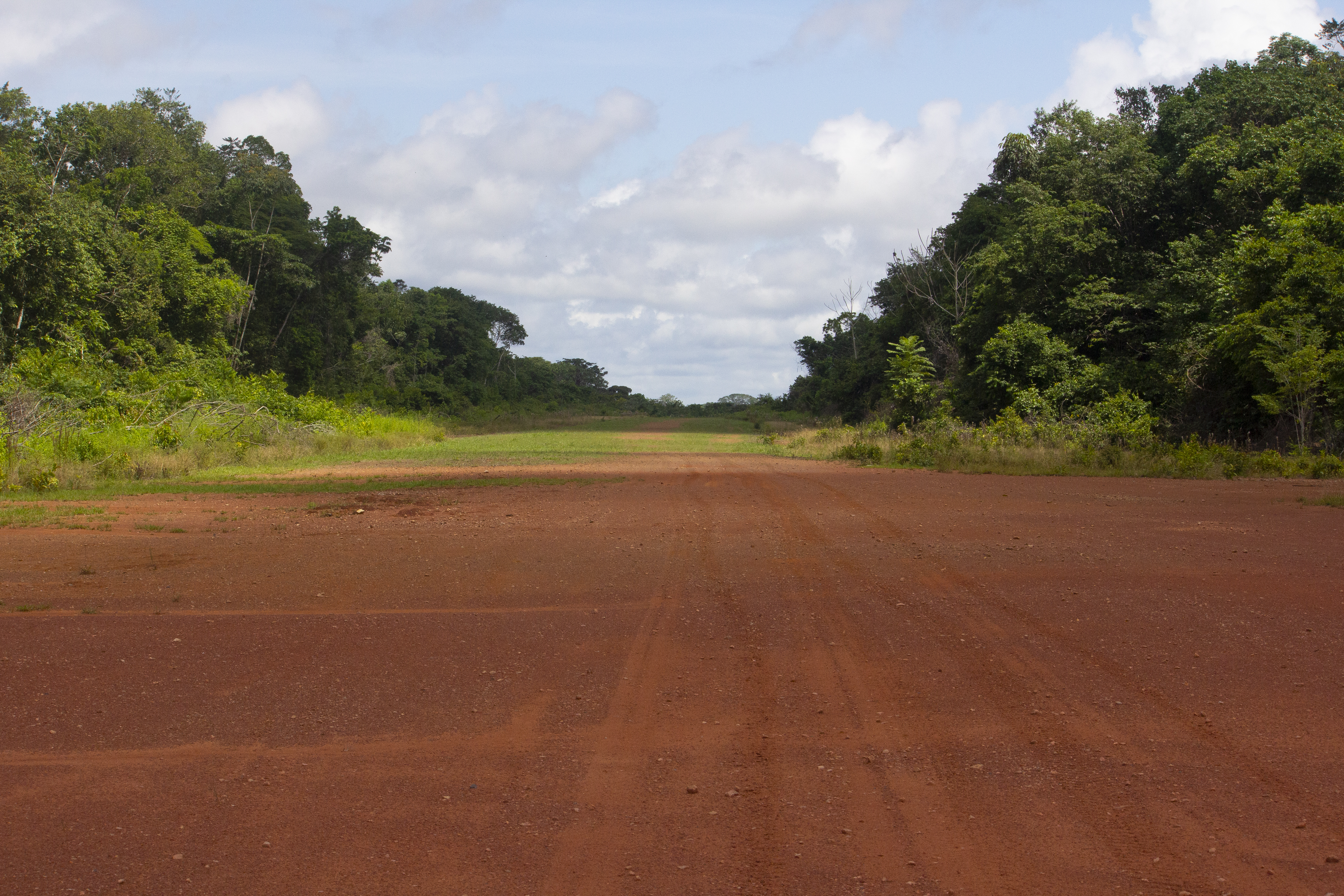
View of Amatopo Airstrip.

Amatopo Airstrip (ICAO: SMAM) is an airstrip located near Amatopo in Suriname.

== Charters and destinations ==
Airlines providing charter flights to this airport are:

Airlines	Destinations
Blue Wing Airlines	Charter: Paramaribo–Zorg en Hoop
Gum Air	Charter: Paramaribo–Zorg en Hoop
Vortex Aviation Suriname	Charter: Paramaribo–Zorg en Hoop

== Incidents and accidents ==
- (Suriname) On 14 November 1976, a de Havilland Canada DHC6-100 Twin Otter, registered PZ-TAV of the Surinaamse Luchtvaart Maatschappij was involved in an accident at the Amatopo Airstrip. The co-pilot, M. van Waveren, was killed when he walked into the running propeller after the landing. The plane was piloted by G. Brunings.

== Tourism ==
From the airstrip there is a tour starting with an 800-meter walk through the rainforest, and then transported by dugout canoe (about 30 minute boat trip) to beautiful Arapahu Island on the Corantijn River, where tourist lodges are available.

== See also ==
- List of airports in Suriname
- Transport in Suriname
