= Raghoebarsing Airstrip =

Raghoebarsing Airstrip Raghoebarsing Vliegveld
- IATA: none; ICAO: SMRN

Summary
- Airport type: Public
- Operator: Luchtvaartdienst Suriname
- Location: near Matapi, Suriname
- Elevation AMSL: 141 ft / 43 m
- Coordinates: 4°53′05″N 56°56′25″W

Map
- Location in Suriname

Runways
Direction	Length		Surface
Direction	m	ft	Surface
15/33	1,200	3,937	Gravel
- Sources: Google Maps

Raghoebarsing Airstrip (IATA: SMRN) is located near Matapi, Suriname.

== Charters and destinations ==
Charter airlines serving this airport are:

Airlines	Destinations
Blue Wing Airlines	Charter: Paramaribo–Zorg en Hoop
Gum Air	Charter: Paramaribo–Zorg en Hoop
Hi-Jet Helicopter Services	Charter: Paramaribo–Zorg en Hoop
Pegasus Air Services	Charter: Paramaribo–Zorg en Hoop

== See also ==
- List of airports in Suriname
- Transport in Suriname
