= Bakhuys =

- Village
- Location within Suriname
- Coordinates: 4.73°N 56.768056°W
- Country: Suriname
- District: Sipaliwini District
- Resort: Kabalebo
- Time zone: UTC-3 (AST)

Bakhuys (also: Bakhuis) is a village in the Kabalebo resort of the Sipaliwini District in Suriname. The village is located near the Bakhuis Mountains. Bakhuis is mainly known for its large bauxite mine which is exploited by Suralco. In 1995, the refinery had received a $120 million upgrade and extension. The village and mountain range have been named after Louis August Bakhuis who led a 1901 expedition into the area.

Bakhuys was part of the West Suriname Plan of the 1970s which was a large scale development plan for the Western part of Suriname and included a railway line from Bakhuys to Apoera. A scaled-down version was resurrected in the 1990s, but also failed to take-off. An unpaved road from Bakhuys to the Southern East-West Link was constructed.

The Bakhuys Airstrip is located near the village.
