= Sipaliwini Airstrip =

- IATA: none; ICAO: SMSI

Summary
- Airport type: Public
- Operator: Luchtvaartdienst Suriname
- Location: Sipaliwini Savanna, Suriname
- Elevation AMSL: 744 ft / 227 m
- Coordinates: 2°01′35″N 56°07′35″W

Map
- Location in Suriname

Runways
Direction	Length		Surface
Direction	m	ft	Surface
10/28	530	1,739	grass
- Sources: GCM Bing Maps

Sipaliwini Airstrip (IATA: SMSI) is an airstrip located near the village of Sipaliwini Savanna, in the most southern part of Suriname in the Sipaliwini District. It was constructed as part of Operation Grasshopper and the runway of the airstrip was publicly opened in 1962.

The marked runway is 530 metres (1,740 ft) long, and has another 800 metres (2,600 ft) of unobstructed grass within the field boundaries on the east end.

== Charters and destinations ==
Charter airlines serving this airport are:

Airlines	Destinations
Blue Wing Airlines	Charter: Paramaribo–Zorg en Hoop
Gum Air	Charter: Paramaribo–Zorg en Hoop
Hi-Jet Helicopter Services	Charter: Paramaribo–Zorg en Hoop

== See also ==
- List of airports in Suriname
- Transport in Suriname
