= Lawa Anapaike Airstrip =

- IATA: none; ICAO: SMLA

Summary
- Airport type: Public
- Operator: Luchtvaartdienst Suriname
- Location: Anapaike, Suriname
- Elevation AMSL: 373 ft / 114 m
- Coordinates: 3°24′40″N 54°01′40″W

Map
- Location in Suriname

Runways
Direction	Length		Surface
Direction	m	ft	Surface
06/24	580	1,903	Grass
09/27	560	1,837	Grass
- Sources: GCM HERE Maps

Lawa Anapaike Airstrip (ICAO: SMLA) is an airstrip serving the Wayana village of Kawemhakan on the Lawa River in Suriname. The airstrip of this relatively modern indigenous village is named after its former chief Anapaike.

== Charters and destinations ==
Charter airlines serving this airport are:

Airlines	Destinations
Blue Wing Airlines	Charter: Paramaribo–Zorg en Hoop
Gum Air	Charter: Paramaribo–Zorg en Hoop
Hi-Jet Helicopter Services	Charter: Paramaribo–Zorg en Hoop
United Air Services	Charter: Paramaribo–Zorg en Hoop
Vortex Aviation Suriname	Charter: Paramaribo–Zorg en Hoop

== Incidents and accidents ==
- (Suriname) On 29 March 2012 a Blue Wing Airlines Cessna 208B Grand Caravan (PZ-TSK) veered to the left of the runway at the Lawa Anapaike Airstrip hitting some tree stumps during its landing. The airplane was lightly damaged, but all ten occupants, the pilot and nine passengers escaped unhurt.

== See also ==
- List of airports in Suriname
- Transport in Suriname
