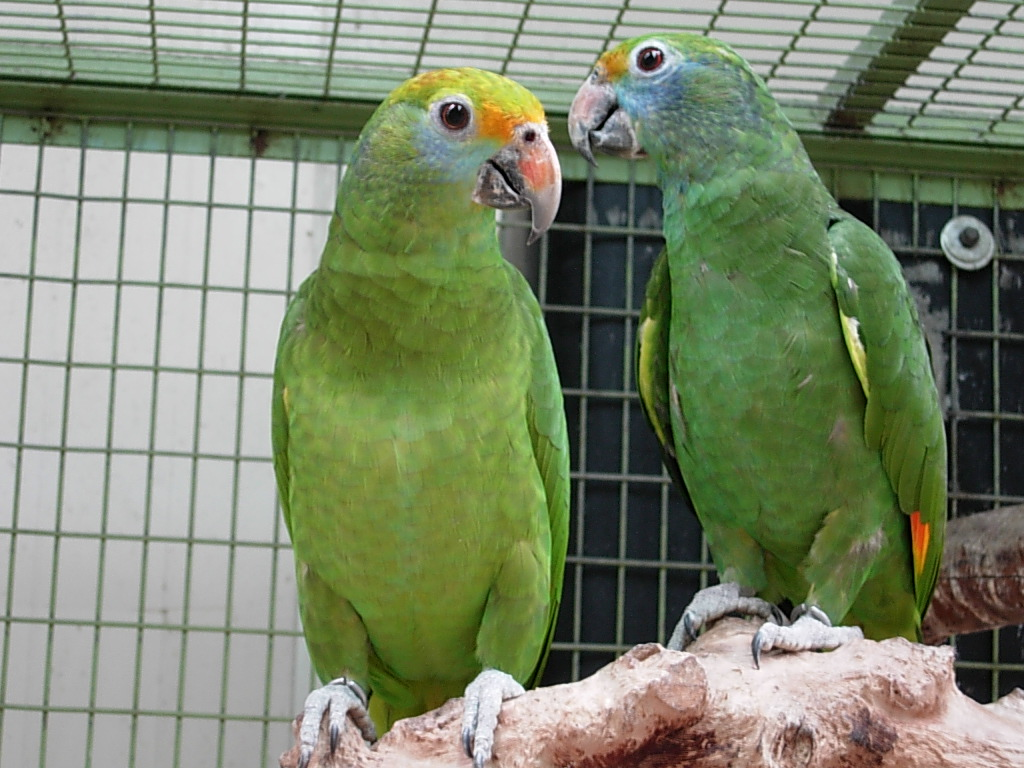

Conservation status
- Near Threatened (IUCN 3.1)
- CITES Appendix II (CITES)

Scientific classification
- Kingdom: Animalia
- Phylum: Chordata
- Class: Aves
- Order: Psittaciformes
- Family: Psittacidae
- Genus: Amazona
- Species: A. dufresniana

Binomial name
- Amazona dufresniana (Shaw, 1812)

= Blue-cheeked amazon =

Species of bird

The blue-cheeked amazon (Amazona dufresniana), also known as blue-cheeked parrot or Dufresne's amazon, is a Near Threatened species of bird in subfamily Arinae of the family Psittacidae, the African and New World parrots. It is found in Brazil, the Guianas, and Venezuela.

== Taxonomy and systematics ==
The blue-cheeked amazon is monotypic. Previously what is now the red-browed amazon (A. rhodocorythra) was treated as a subspecies of the blue-cheeked, and at other times both of them were treated as subspecies of the red-tailed amazon (A. brasiliensis).

The specific epithet of this species commemorates the French zoologist Louis Dufresne.

== Description ==
The blue-cheeked amazon is 34 to 37 cm (13 to 15 in) long and weighs 481 to 615 g (17 to 22 oz). The sexes are alike. Adults are mostly green. They are ochre on their lores and immediate forehead; the rest of the forehead and most of their crown are yellow with green tips on the feathers. Their lower half of their face, the sides of their neck, and the sides of their throat are lavender blue. Their nape and the rest of their upperparts and their underparts are green. The feathers of the nape and side of the neck have black edges that give a scalloped appearance. Their tail feathers are green with yellow tips that are wider on the outer feathers. The carpal edge of their wing is yellowish green and their primaries are black with blue outer webs. Their inner secondaries are green with pale blue tips and the outer ones bright yellow or orange, also with pale blue tips. Their iris is blackish, their bill dusky with a red base on the maxilla, and their legs and feed gray. Immature birds are similar to adults, but with less blue on the head and duller yellow on the crown.

== Distribution and habitat ==
The blue-cheeked amazon is found from extreme eastern Venezuela east through Guyana, Suriname, and French Guiana and south slightly into northern Brazil. The species' habitat requirements are not well understood. In the Venezuela/Guyana tepui zone it occurs in humid lowland forest and the foothills. In Suriname it occurs during part of the year in forests on the coastal sand ridges. In elevation it ranges from sea level to (in Venezuela) 1,700 m (5,600 ft).

== Behavior ==
=== Movement ===
The blue-cheeked amazon is thought to be generally sedentary but some make seasonal movements between the Suriname interior and coast. It generally travels in single-species flocks of up to about 30 birds.

=== Feeding ===
The blue-cheeked amazon feeds mostly in the forest canopy. Its diet is almost unknown; it is assumed to include seeds, fruits, and blossoms like that of other Amazona parrots.

=== Breeding ===
Almost all of the limited knowledge about the blue-cheeked amazon's breeding biology is from captive birds. In captivity their clutch size is three eggs and the incubation period is 23 to 26 days.

=== Vocalization ===
The blue-cheeked amazon is highly vocal except when feeding. On characteristic call is "a loud, raucous, and throaty queenk-queenk-queenk...with [a] distinctly nasal quality" which is given both from a perch and in flight. They also make "harsher notes and a gurgling, babbling song."

== Status ==
The IUCN has assessed the blue-cheeked amazon as Near Threatened. It has a somewhat restricted range and its estimated population of between 6000 and 61,000 mature individuals is believed to be decreasing. The pet trade is thought to have had a significant effect though the level of it has significantly declined since the late 1900s. Logging in its habitat appears to be the current major threat with gold and other mining contributing. It is considered rare to uncommon in most of its range though common in the very small portion of it in Venezuela.
