= Käyser Mountains =

Mountain range in Suriname

- Location within Suriname

Highest point
- Elevation: 861 m (2,825 ft)
- Coordinates: 3°1′N 56°41′W

Geography
- Country: Suriname

The Käyser Mountains (Dutch: Käysergebergte) is a mountain range in the Sipaliwini District of Suriname. It is named after Conrad Carel Käyser. The Käyser Airstrip was built in 1960 at the foot of the mountains as part of Operation Grasshopper to access the interior of Suriname.
