= Structural moving average model =

In finance, a structural moving average model (SMAM) is used to calculate account balances dynamically, but with a structured method of calculation. This calculation is based on many features like the account's security balance position, cash balance and assets worth, etc.. This method of balance calculation is mostly used in trading like short selling using the margin balances.
