= Amatopo =

Amatopo Amotopo
- Location in Suriname
- Coordinates: 3°32′50″N 57°38′35″W
- Country: Suriname
- District: Sipaliwini District
- Resort: Coeroeni

Government
  - Head captain: Pepoe Ipajari

Population (2020)
  - Total: 27

Amatopo or Amotopo is a Tiriyó village on the Courentyne River in the Sipaliwini District of Suriname. The village lies next to the Amatopo Airstrip.The Frederik Willem IV Falls and Arapahu Island are located 6.5 miles upstream from the village.

== Overview ==
The residents of the village consider themselves Okomoyana, which means "wasp people". The Okomoyana category can be seen as a subdivision of the Tiriyó people, and the Okomoyana indeed speak the Tiriyó language. The villagers who settled in the village came from Kwamalasamutu.

The airstrip was constructed during Operation Grasshopper. In the West Suriname Plan, Amatopo was to play an important role in the mining of bauxite in the area. Even a road was constructed from Amatopo to Paramaribo, but this road was deserted after the Surinamese Interior War. The first two settlers moved into the unused buildings near the airstrip. Later a pilot chased them away. Asongo Alalaparu, the granman (paramount chief) told them to return, and built their houses next to the facilities which were already present. The settlement started in 2001.

== Frederik Willem IV Falls ==
The Frederik Willem IV Falls also Anora Falls are located in the Courentyne River near Amatopo. In 1871, Charles Barrington Brown discovered that the river above the waterfalls splits into two rivers. Arapahu Island is a river island located below the waterfalls.

== Tourism ==
An eco-lodge is situated on the waterfront next to the village of Amatopo. The visitors of the eco-lodge make use of Amatopo Airstrip to reach their destination.
