= Luchtvaartdienst Suriname =

The Luchtvaartdienst Suriname is the Civil Aviation Department of the Suriname Ministry of Transport, Communication and Tourism. It is responsible for the regulation of all aviation activities in the country, and ensures that all activities are carried out in compliance with international standards. It is a member of the International Civil Aviation Organization (ICAO).

In April 2010, John Veira, the head of Luchtvaartdienst Suriname, was killed in his home by gunmen.

== Airports and Airstrips ==
Luchtvaartdienst Suriname operates the following domestic airports and airstrips:

- Major Henk Fernandes Airport
- Vincent Fayks Airport
- Washabo Airport
- Afobaka Airstrip
- Alalapadu Airstrip
- Albina Airstrip
- Amatopo Airstrip
- Apetina Airstrip
- Avanavero Airstrip
- Bakhuys Airstrip
- Botopasi Airstrip
- Cabana Airstrip
- Cayana Airstrip
- Coeroenie Airstrip
- Djumu Airstrip
- Donderskamp Airstrip
- Drietabbetje Airstrip
- Gakaba Airstrip
- Godo Holo Airstrip
- Gross Rosebel Airstrip
- Jarikaba Airstrip
- Kabalebo Airstrip
- Kayser Airstrip
- Kwamelasemoetoe Airstrip
- Laduani Airstrip
- Langatabbetje Airstrip
- Lawa Anapaike Airstrip
- Lawa Antino Airstrip
- Lawa Cottica Airstrip
- Lawa Tabiki Airstrip
- Lelygebergte Airstrip
- Moengo Airstrip
- Njoeng Jacob Kondre Airstrip
- Oelemari Airport
- Poeketi Airstrip
- Poesoegroenoe Airstrip
- Ragoebarsing Airstrip
- Raleigh Airstrip
- Sarakreek Airstrip
- Sipaliwini Airstrip
- Stoelmans Eiland Airstrip
- Tafelberg Airstrip
- Tepoe Airstrip
- Totness Airstrip
- Vier Gebroeders Airstrip
- Wageningen Airstrip
