= Lely Mountains =

Mountain plateau in Suriname

- Location within Suriname

Highest point
- Elevation: 685 m (2,247 ft)
- Coordinates: 4.3714°N 54.6632°W

Geography
- Country: Suriname
- District: Sipaliwini District

The Lely Mountains (Dutch: Lelygebergte, Ndyuka: Ando Busiman Mongo) are a mountain plateau on the left bank of the Tapanahony and Marowijne rivers in Suriname. The plateau has a maximum altitude of about 685 metres (2,247 ft). In 2005, 25 new species were discovered in the Lely Mountains.

The mountain range is served by the Lelygebergte Airstrip.

== Name ==
The mountain range is named after Cornelis Lely, a former governor of Suriname. The Ndyuka maroons call the mountains the Ando Busiman Mongo after the famed Ndyuka explorer Ando Busiman.
