= Bakhuis Mountains =

Mountain range in Suriname

- Location within Suriname

Highest point
- Elevation: 956 m (3,136 ft)
- Coordinates: 4°21′N 56°45′W

Geography
- Country: Suriname
- District: Sipaliwini District

The Bakhuis Mountains (Dutch: Bakhuisgebergte) are a mountain range in central Suriname, spanning 110 kilometres. The mountain range form of the northern part of the Wilhelmina Mountains, and the mountains and its village were named after the Dutch explorer and Royal Dutch East Indies Army officer Louis August Bakhuis. The range lies in the Sipaliwini Savanna District of Suriname. The Bakhuys Airstrip is near the village.

== Geography ==
=== Geology ===
The Bakhuis Mountains have rich deposits of bauxite, as well as nickel and copper. In 1974, a new mineral named surinamite ((Mg, Fe^{2+})_{3}Al_{4}BeSi_{3}O_{16}) was found in the mountain range. The Bakhuis mountain range is an area of 2800 km² and contains a large concession area for mining bauxite, in which both the Surinamese company Suralco and foreign exploitation companies are interested. Ecologists fear destruction of jungle area when the mining commences.

=== Environment ===
The mountains vary in height from 300–946 m (984–3,104 ft), and are covered with largely pristine forest. The range has been designated an Important Bird Area (IBA) by BirdLife International because it supports significant populations of many birds, including the near-threatened crested eagle, harpy eagle and blue-cheeked parrot, among 378 species recorded.

== History ==
In the second half of the 20th century there was already a plan to economically exploit the area: the West Suriname Plan, centered on the mining of bauxite in the Bakhuis Mountains. After Suriname became independent of the Netherlands in the 1980s, however, the implementation of this plan was discontinued. A railway was built in 1976, connecting the Bakhuis Mountains with Apoera, however the railway was never put into use and was abandoned in 2002.
