= Rosebel gold mine =

Gold mine in Brokopondo, Suriname

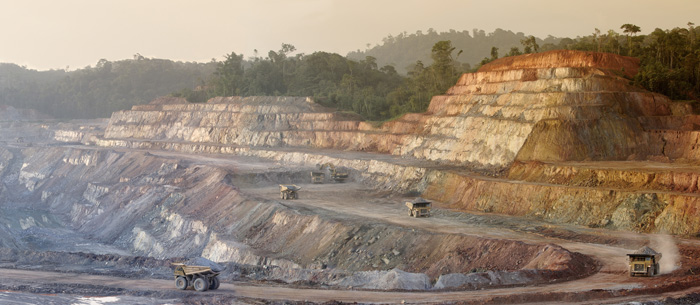

- Location in Suriname
- Location: Brokopondo district, Suriname; 5°4′37″N 55°9′21″W
- Production: 312,000
- Financial year: 2012
- Opened: 2004
- Closed: 2028 (estimated)
- Company: Zijin Mining (95%) and the Government of Suriname (5%)

The Rosebel gold mine is jointly owned by Zijin Mining (95%) and the government of Suriname (5%).

The mine is located in the mineral-rich Brokopondo District in northeastern Suriname, South America. The Rosebel property lies approximately 85 kilometers south of the capital city of Paramaribo. The mining concession covers 170 square kilometers.

== History ==
Gold was first discovered in the Rosebel area in 1879 when small-scale miners were reported to have been working on the concession. Since its discovery, the land has been both publicly and privately owned and operated. Notable private owners have included Placer Development of Vancouver from 1974 to 1977, the Grasshopper Aluminum Company from 1979 to 1985 and Golden Star Resources Ltd. from 1992. In October 2001, Cambior acquired Golden Star's interest in the Rosebel property.

Commercial production commenced in February 2004. Iamgold acquired Rosebel as part of its acquisition of Cambior in late 2006. In 2008 total employment at the mine was 1199 people. The property is accessible via paved and all-weather gravel roads from Paramaribo, a drive of about 110 kilometers. There is a small airstrip located onsite approximately 2 kilometers from the mill operations. The Rosebel concession owns this Gross Rosebel Airstrip, which is 1 kilometer long and security personnel is responsible for airstrip maintenance and lighting. Rosebel's power is sourced from the nearby Afobaka Dam and from a diesel generation plant.

In June 2013, IAMGOLD and the government of Suriname signed the agreement extending the lease until 2042.

On May 28, 2014, IAMGOLD began installation of what will be the largest solar panel project in Suriname. The project will cost $14 million and, will increase the power available to the mine.

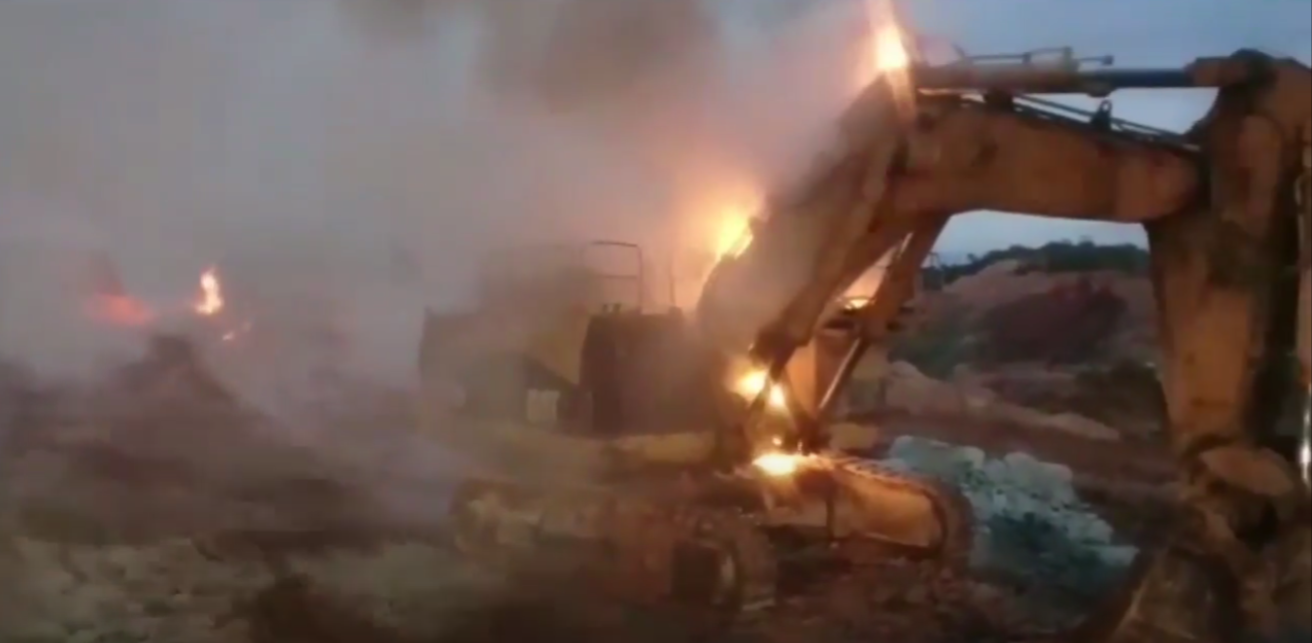
The result of protesting gold miners

In July 2017, Iamgold disclosed that they had increased their reserves by 80% and that the ounces they were adding would extend the life of the mine to 2028.

In July 2019 there were disturbances at the mine that made the news. One man was killed after the police tried to move on locals who were prospecting on their own account. The local parliamentarian Diana Pokie had to intervene. She called upon the mine owners to find a solution and that they should pay compensation to the dead man's family.

On October 18, 2022, Zijin Mining purchased Iamgold's 95% interest in the Rosebel gold mine . On February 1, 2023 the deal was completed.

== Production ==
In Suriname, the Zijin Mining subsidiary company Rosebel Gold Mines N.V. operates the Rosebel gold mine with the Government of Suriname owning a 5% stake. It is located near the town of Brownsweg and an open pit mine. Golden Star Resources and Cambior had conducted the exploration and development work to bring the mine into commercial production in 2004. Golden Star sold its stake to Euro Ressources S.A. which Iamgold acquired in 2008 while Iamgold earlier acquired Cambior in 2006. With 2.9 million ounces in proved and probable reserves as of 2020 (with additional reserves in the neighboring Saramacca expansion property and potential for zinc extraction), the mine has produced approximately 300,000 ounces of gold per year. The Rosebel gold mine began commercial production in 2004 and as at the end of 2016 had produced 4.4 million ounces of gold.

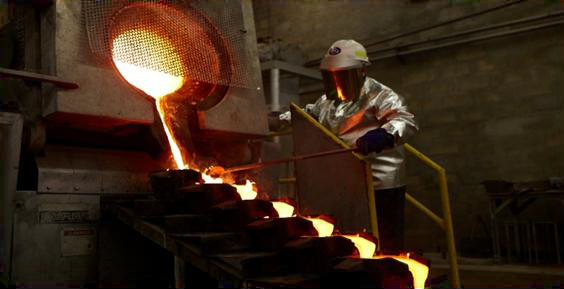
Pouring gold at the Rosebel Gold Mine

Recent production figures of the mine were:

Year	Production (ounces)	Estimates
2011	406,000	
2012	402,000	
2013	354,000	365k to 385k
2014	342,000	
2015	302,000	290k to 300k
2016	312,000	
2017	TBD	295k to 305k
