= Godo Holo =

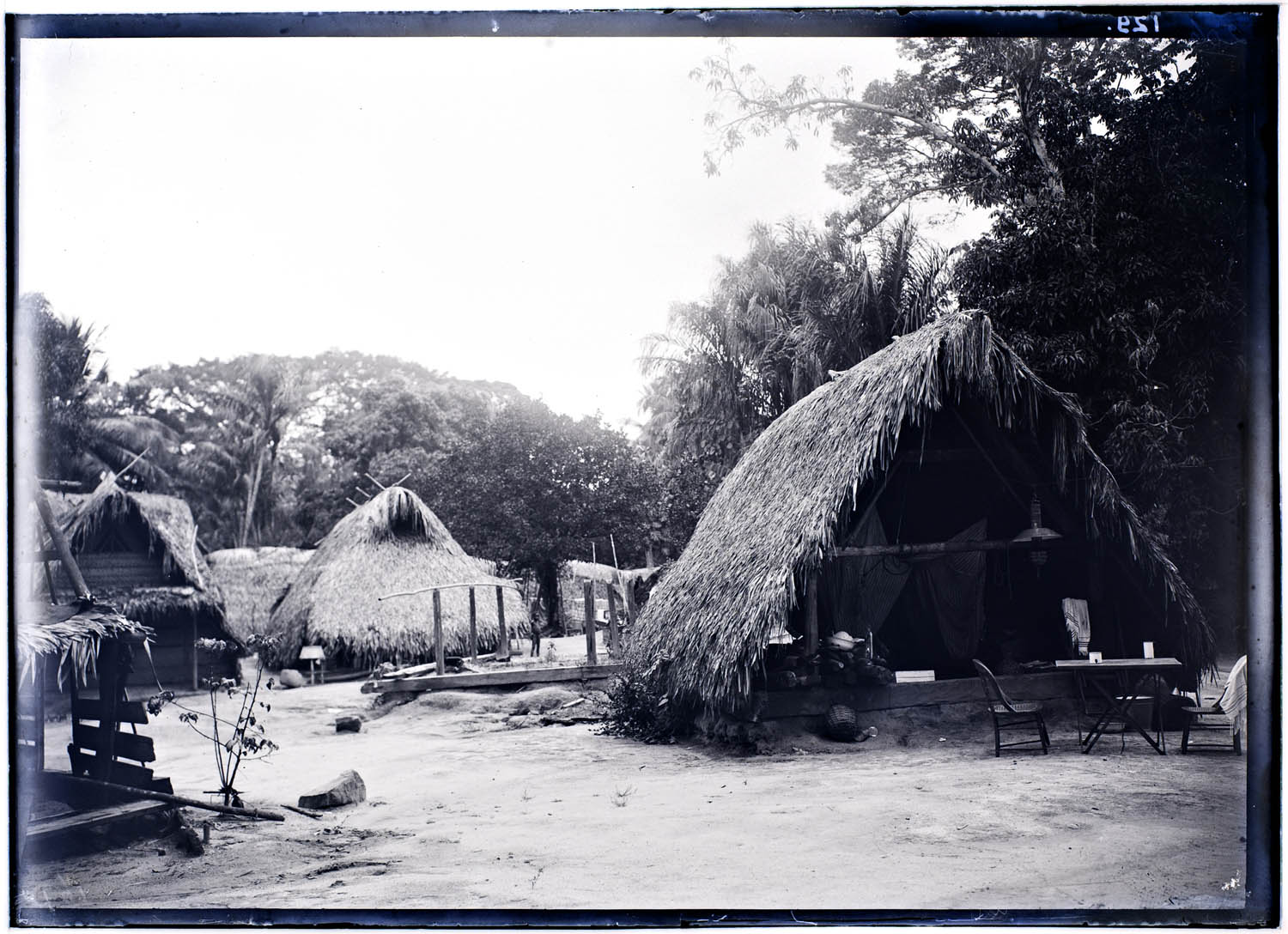
- Fisiti in 1904

- Location within Suriname
- Coordinates: 4.060556°N 54.7875°W
- Country: Suriname
- District: Sipaliwini District
- Resort: Tapanahony
- Time zone: UTC-3

Godo Holo (also Godo Olo) is a group of villages in the Tapanahony resort of the Sipaliwini District of Suriname. The villages are inhabited by Maroons of the Ndyuka people.

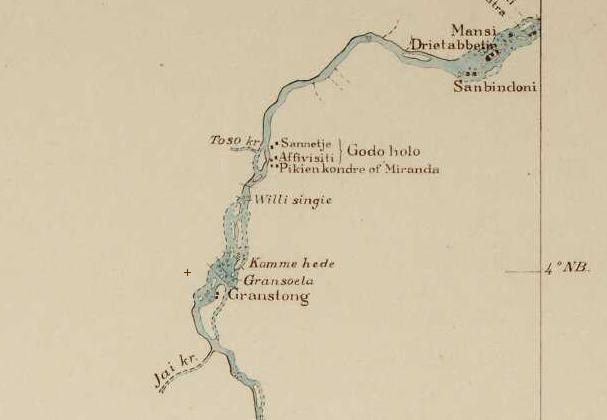
Godo Holo on a 1882 map

Godo Olo is the name for a group of three neighbouring villages: Saniki (also Sannetje), Fisiti (also Affivisti) and Pikienkondre of Miranda (Miranda's little village).

Godo Holo has a school and two churches, Medical care is provided in Diitabiki which is about 10 kilometres North East of Godo Holo. Godo Holo has regular flights to Paramaribo from the Godo Holo Airstrip which is located in Pikinkondre of Miranda. In November 2019, it was announced that the villages will get 24 hours of electricity via solar panels.

== Bibliography ==
- Stichting Planbureau Suriname (2014). "STRUCTUUR ANALYSE DISTRICTEN 2009-2013" (PDF). Planning Office Suriname. Archived from the original (PDF) on 2023-03-26.
