= Operation Grasshopper =

Suriname natural resources search project

The seven new airstrips

Operation Grasshopper was a project to look for natural resources in Suriname from the air. For this project, seven airstrips were constructed in the interior of Suriname from 1959 onward.

The project was the brainchild of the Minister of Development of Suriname at the time, Frank Essed. In order to speed up the process of mapping the natural resources of the country—under the method used at the time it would at least take another few decades before the whole country was mapped—the plan foresaw the exploration of the country by flying over it using planes with magnetometers and scintillometers on board. In order to be able to do this, seven airstrips were needed in the interior of Suriname. The 7 airstrips were built for the purpose to make the interior accessible for exploration activities.

During the construction of an airport near Paloemeu, a plane carrying building material crashed nearby. The pilot and co-pilot, Vincent Fajks and Ronald Kappel died in the crash. The airport was subsequently named after Fajks. The airstrip at Tafelberg was named after Mr. Kappel.

One result of Operation Grasshopper was the discovery of bauxite in the Bakhuis Mountains. This led to the drafting of the West Suriname Plan.

== Airports constructed during Operation Grasshopper ==
- Kabalebo Airstrip
- Coeroeni Airstrip
- Kayser Airstrip
- Oelemari Airstrip
- Sipaliwini Airstrip
- Tafelberg Airstrip
- Vincent Fayks Airport
