= Sipaliwini Savanna (town) =

Sipaliwini Savanna Sipaliwini
- Location in Suriname
- Coordinates: 2°1′30″N 56°7′29″W
- Country: Suriname
- District: Sipaliwini District
- Resort: Coeroeni

Government
  - Captain: Essikeo Japawai

Population (2022)
  - Total: 86
- Sources: Bing Maps OSM

Sipaliwini Savanna, also called Sipaliwini, is a Tiriyó village on the Sipaliwini River in the Sipaliwini District in the far south of Suriname. The village lies next to the Sipaliwini Airstrip. The nearest village in Suriname is Alalapadu which is located 60 kilometres north on a map, but due to the twists and turns of the river, the town of Kwamalasamutu which lies 83 kilometres west is easier to reach. The Brazilian village of Missão can be reached by an unpaved path.

The electricity facilities were destroyed during the Surinamese Interior War, and only a couple of private diesel generators remained operating. As of November 2019, the village has 24 hours of electricity using solar panels. There is a school, a clinic and a church. The economy depends on small scale agriculture.
