= Zorg en Hoop Airport =

Secondary general aviation airport in Paramaribo, Suriname

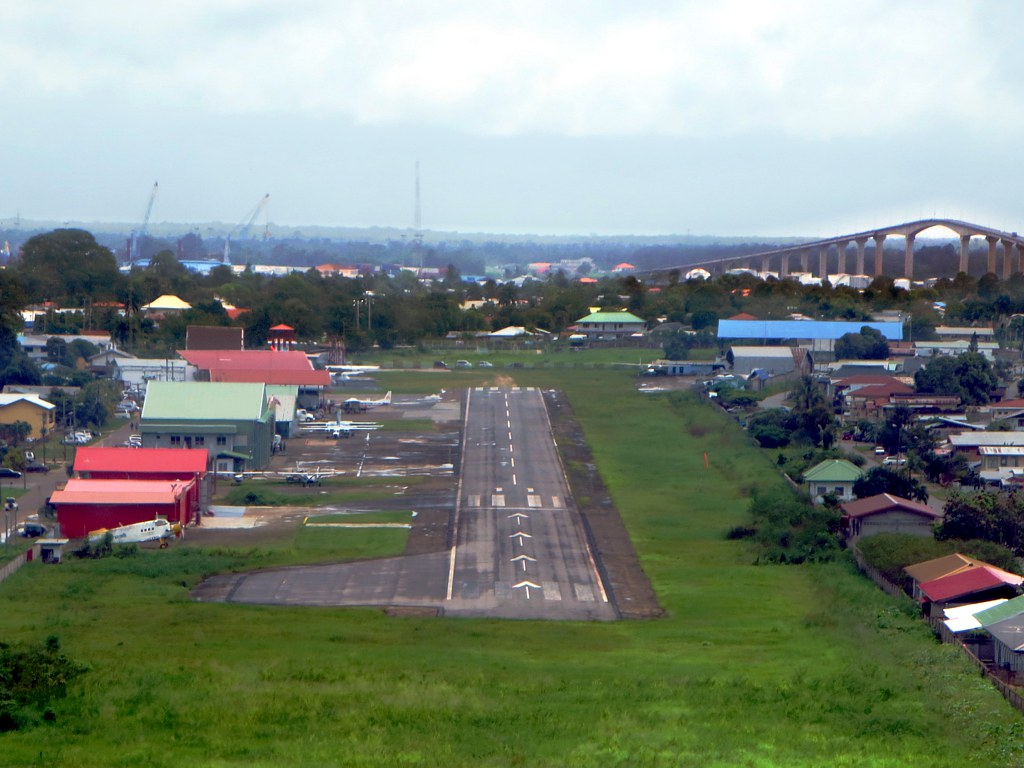
- IATA: ORG; ICAO: SMZO

Summary
- Airport type: Public
- Location: Paramaribo, Suriname
- Hub for: Blue Wing Airlines; Gum Air
- Elevation AMSL: 10 ft (3.0 m)
- Coordinates: 05°48′40″N 55°11′25″W

Map
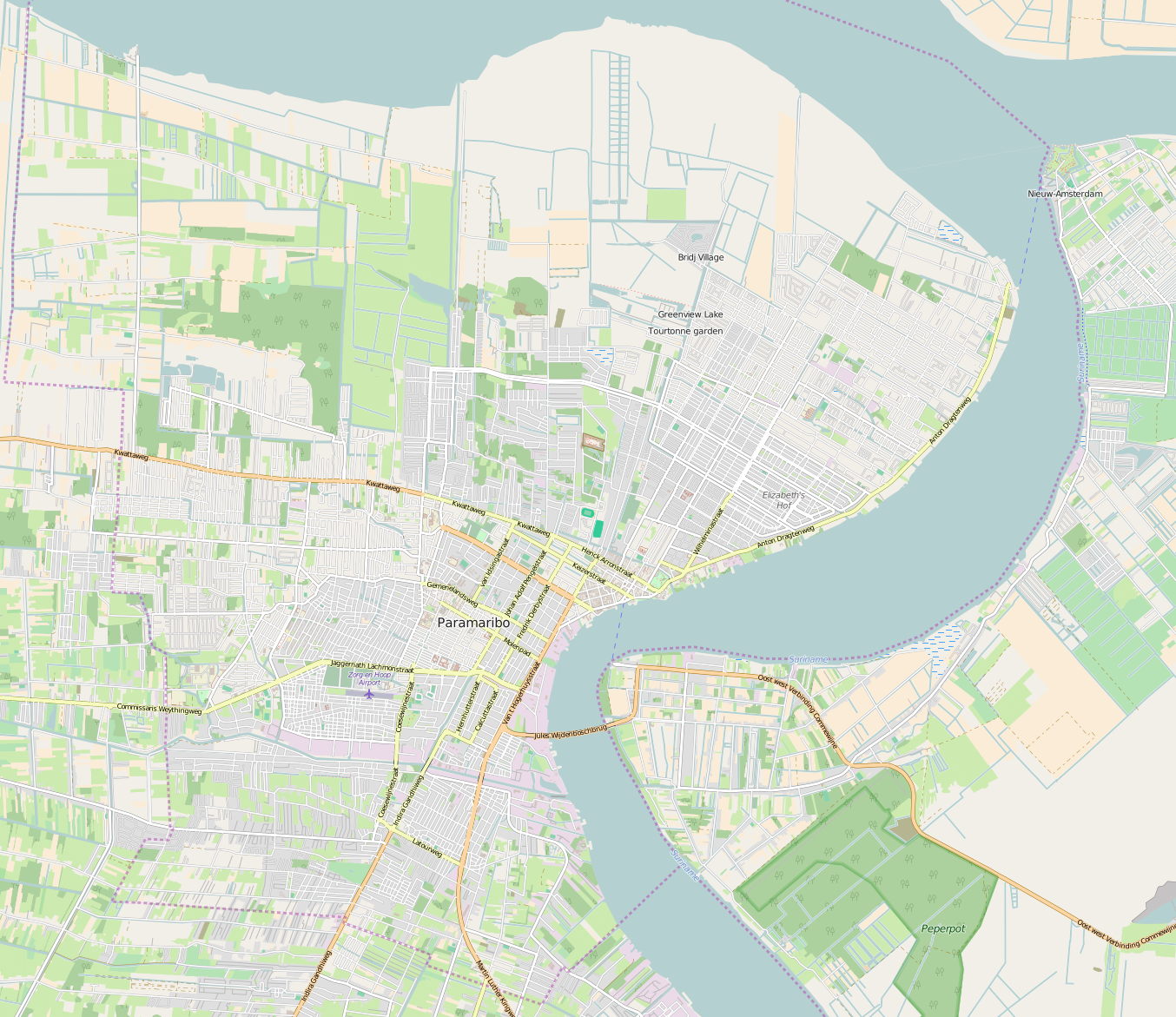
- Location in Paramaribo

Runways
Direction	Length		Surface
Direction	m	ft	Surface
11/29	750	2,461	Asphalt
- Sources: GCM Google Maps

Zorg en Hoop Airport (IATA: ORG, ICAO: SMZO) is a small airport in the city of Paramaribo, Suriname. It is 3 kilometres (1.9 mi) west of the Suriname River, between the city quarters of Zorg en Hoop and Flora. It is mainly used for general aviation, flight training, emergency medical services and charter operations besides sparse scheduled flights.

== History ==
In October 1952 (73 years ago), the airport was put into use when Rudi Kappel and Herman van Eyck started a first Surinamese air company. The first flight was made with a Stinson Reliant airplane with registration PZ-TAA (MSN 77-167) of the company Kappel-van Eyck. In November 1952, this company built the first hangar at Zorg en Hoop airfield and added a second Stinson Reliant (PZ-TAB) to their fleet. In the summer of 1953, Zorg en Hoop Airport was used to develop many airstrips in the interior. The first mail delivery and passenger flights in Suriname were made from Zorg en Hoop to Moengo on 22 August 1953, and to Coronie on September 28. Later also to Nickerie and Albina with the new Piper Cub (PZ-NAC) of Kappel-van Eyck named "Colibri".

== Operations ==
The runway length includes a 200 metres (660 ft) displaced threshold on Runway 11. The airport is suitable for charters and regular services with smaller aircraft, and for helicopter flights. Connection is maintained from the airport for several smaller airports in the interior of Suriname, and for charter flights to the Caribbean. The only regular international service is to Georgetown, Guyana, with flights operated by Trans Guyana Airways and Gum Air with smaller propeller aircraft. Airlines operating jet aircraft serve Paramaribo via the larger Johan Adolf Pengel International Airport located 45 kilometres (28 mi) south of the city at Zanderij.

== Airlines and destinations ==
The following airlines operate regular scheduled flights to and from Zorg en Hoop:

Airlines	Destinations
Gum Air	Georgetown–Ogle
Trans Guyana Airways	Georgetown–Ogle

== See also ==
- List of airports in Suriname
- Transport in Suriname
