= Transport in Suriname =

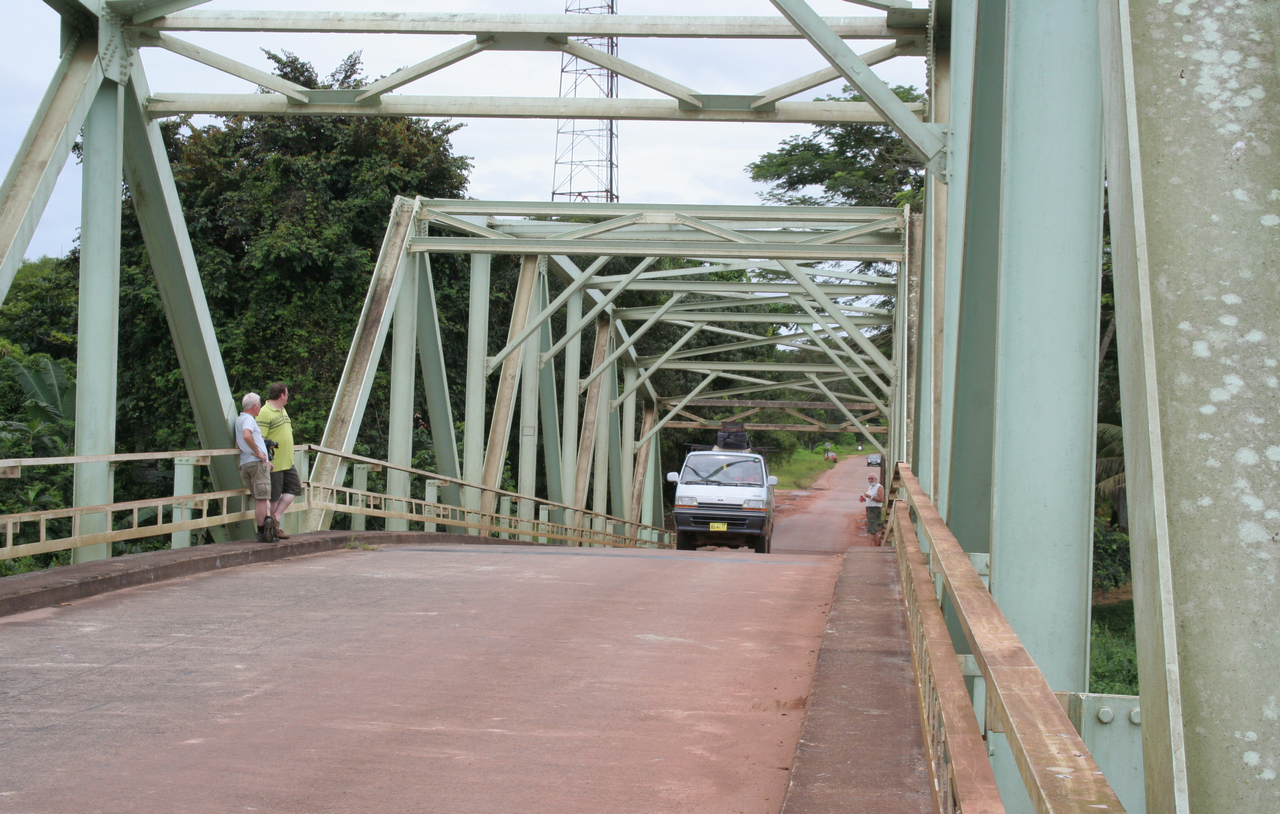
Bridge near Potribo

The Republic of Suriname (Dutch: Republiek Suriname) has a number of forms of transport. Transportation emissions are an increasing part of Suriname's contributions to climate change, as part of the Nationally Determined Contributions for the Paris Agreement, Suriname has committed to emissions controls for vehicles and increased public transit investment.

== Railways ==
- Railways, total: 166 km single track.
  - standard gauge: 80 km 1,435 mm (4 ft 8 1/2 in) gauge in West-Suriname, but not in use. This stretch was constructed as part of the West Suriname Plan.
  - narrow gauge: 86 km 1,000 mm (3 ft 3 3/8 in) gauge Lawa Railway from Onverwacht to Sarakreek, currently not in use. In 2014, a plan had been announced to reopen the line between Onverwacht and Paramaribo Central Station. The intention was for the line to be extended onto Paramaribo Adolf Pengel Airport, but as of May 2020, the project had not started.

=== Rail links with adjacent countries ===
- None

== Highways ==
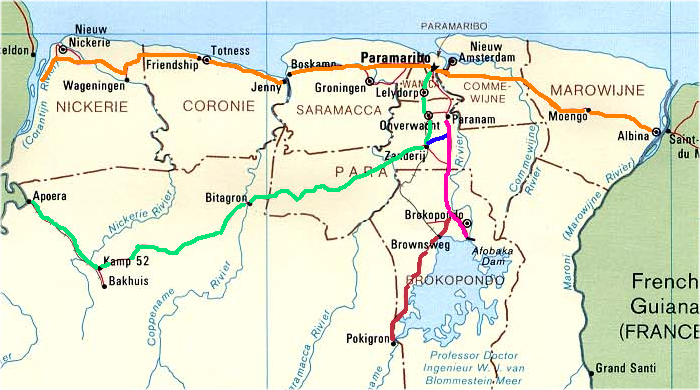
Main roads in Suriname: East-West Link / Southern East-West Link; Desiré Delano Bouterse Highway: Avobakaweg / Ghaama Agbagoweg

=== Statistics ===
- total: 4,304 km (2003)
- paved: 1,119 km (2003)
- highway: 9.6 km (2020)
- unpaved: 3,174 km (2003)

NOTE: Driving is on the left. Suriname and its neighbour Guyana are the only two countries on the (in-land) American continent which still drive on the left.

=== Road links with adjacent countries ===
- Guyana - Yes, ferry from Nieuw-Nickerie to Corriverton.
- Brazil - None.
- (France) French Guiana - Yes, ferry from Albina to Saint-Laurent-du-Maroni.

== Waterways ==
1,200 km; most important means of transport; oceangoing vessels with drafts ranging up to 7 m can navigate many of the principal waterways.

=== Ports and harbours ===
- Albina
- Moengo
- Nieuw-Nickerie
- Paramaribo: Jules Sedney Harbour is the main harbour for cargo.
- Paramaribo: Waterkant is used by ferries.
- Paranam
- Wageningen

=== Merchant marine ===
- total: 10 ships.
- ships by type: (2018)
  - cargo ship 5
  - petroleum tanker 3
  - other 2

== Airports ==
- 55 (2013)
- List of airports in Suriname

=== Paved runways ===
- total: 6
- over 3,047 m: 1
- under 914 m: 5 (2013)

=== Unpaved runways ===
- total: 49
- 914 to 1,523 m: 4
- under 914 m: 45 (2013)

== See also ==
- Rail transport by country
