= Guyana–Suriname relations =

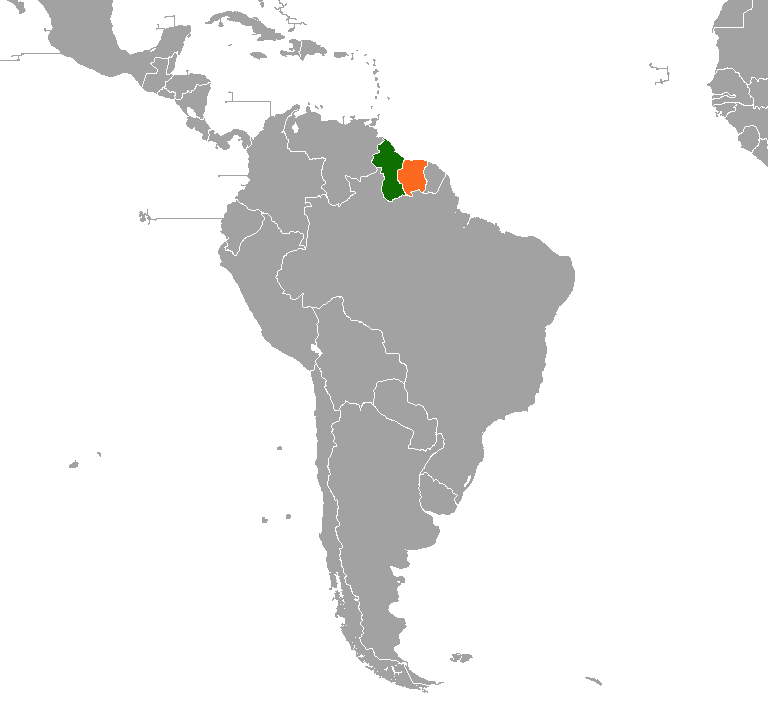

- Guyana: Suriname

Guyana–Suriname relations are the bilateral relations between Guyana and Suriname. Suriname has an embassy in Georgetown. Guyana has an embassy in Paramaribo. The Courentyne River makes up most of the border between the two countries.

== History ==
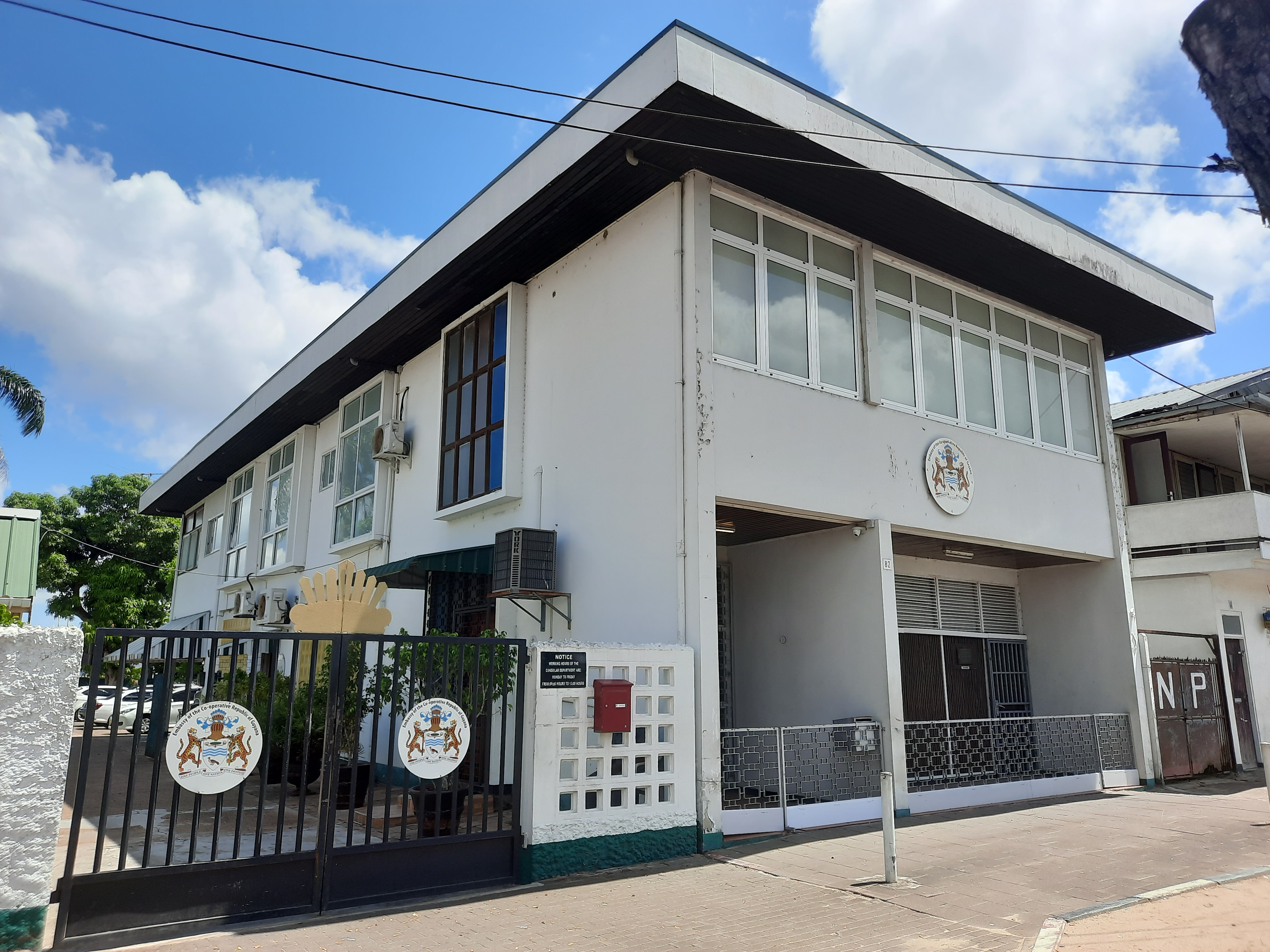
Embassy of Guyana in Paramaribo

Guyana and Suriname (along with French Guiana and Trinidad and Tobago) share many geologic, cultural and historical similarities, as well as their distinct position as West Indian societies estranged from the rest of South America. Historically, both countries were settled by the Dutch, and impacted by importation of slaves from Africa for the sugar industry. After the abolition of slavery, another wave of labor was brought in from Asia; mainly Indians to both countries, and Indonesians to Suriname alone.

On 26 May 1966, the date of the independence of Guyana, the relation with the then Dutch colony of Suriname was normal, however it quickly deteriorated. In 1967, the Tigri Area conflict about a disputed area started which accumulated in an exchange of gunfire without casualties on 19 August 1969 at Camp Tigri. A maritime boundary dispute was resolved in 2007 under an arbitration by the United Nations International Tribunal for the Law of the Sea.

In the 2010s, the relationship improved. In 2016, a Parliamentary Contact Plan, was passed strengthening communication between both parliaments. By 2020, the relation was described as excellent. On 8 August 2020, Suriname President Chan Santokhi attended the inauguration of Guyanese President Irfaan Ali. In August 2021, there was a state visit of Santokhi to Guyana.

There is an ongoing unresolved territorial dispute between Guyana and Suriname regarding the Tigri Area.

== Diplomatic ties and organizations ==
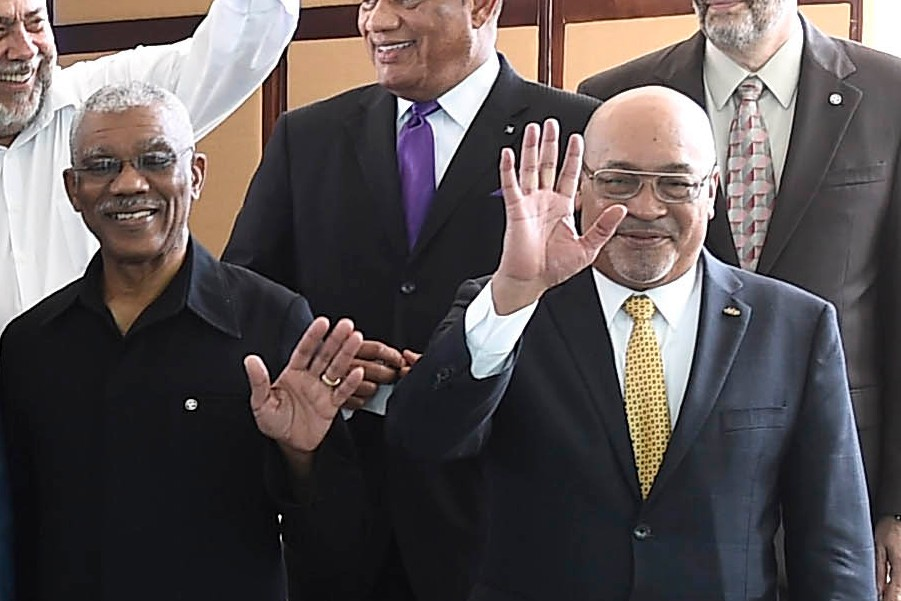
David A. Granger and Desi Bouterse at a CARICOM meeting (2012)

Both countries established diplomatic relations on 25 November 1975.

On 26 May 1966, there was no embassy or consulate in Guyana, and the affairs where handled by the Dutch embassy in Haiti. The Surinamese government postponed the opening of an embassy until there was sufficient normalisation of the relationship. In 1979, an embassy was established in Guyana, which was temporary housed in the Pegasus hotel in Georgetown.

Guyana was represented by a consulate in Paramaribo. On 25 November 1975, the date of independence of Suriname, the consulate was transformed into an embassy. Guyana operates a consulate in Nieuw-Nickerie.

Both countries are full members of: Caribbean Community (CARICOM), Community of Latin American and Caribbean States, Group of 77, Group of African, Caribbean and Pacific countries, Non-Aligned Movement, Organisation of Islamic Cooperation, Organization of American States, Union of South American Nations, and of the United Nations. Guyana and Suriname are both associate members of Mercosur. Petrocaribe was launched in 2005 for cheap oil from Venezuela provided to member states and Guyana and Suriname are both members.

In May 2025, Suriname temporarily closed its embassy in Georgetown, Guyana, due to civil unrest following the controversial death of an 11-year-old girl, Adriana Younge. The Surinamese ambassador to Guyana, Liselle Blankendal, confirmed the closure, citing safety concerns amid widespread protests and disturbances in the Guyanese capital. These events were triggered by the results of a forensic autopsy, conducted by three international coroners including American expert Gary Collins, which concluded that the girl had drowned; a conclusion disputed by segments of the Guyanese public. In response to the unrest, Guyanese authorities imposed a nightly curfew, banned public gatherings, and deployed special police units. Suriname’s government advised its citizens to avoid traveling to Guyana during this period and recommended those already in the country stay in contact with the embassy through digital channels.

== Transportation ==
MV Canawaima Ferry Service moves goods and people between South Drain and Moleson Creek. A bridge across the Corentyne River has been considered to enhance trade and economic relations as well as cultural exchange between the peoples of the two countries. In 2020, a Memorandum of Understanding was written between the two countries for the plan, and Guyanese minister Juan Edghill and Riad Nurmohamed, his Surinamese counterpart, placed flags to indicate the planned route.

Another large scale collaborative effort is the construction of a US$ 1billion offshore base to support oil drilling in the Guyana-Suriname basin.

== Trade ==
In 2019, Suriname exported US$87 million worth of goods to Guyana with the main export product being refined petroleum. Guyana accounted for 3.3% of the total exports. In 2019, Guyana exported US$1.65 million to Suriname with the main exports being shipping and paper containers.

== See also ==
- Foreign relations of Guyana
- Foreign relations of Suriname
