= List of rivers of Suriname =

This is a list of rivers in Suriname, located in the Guiana Shield of northern South America.

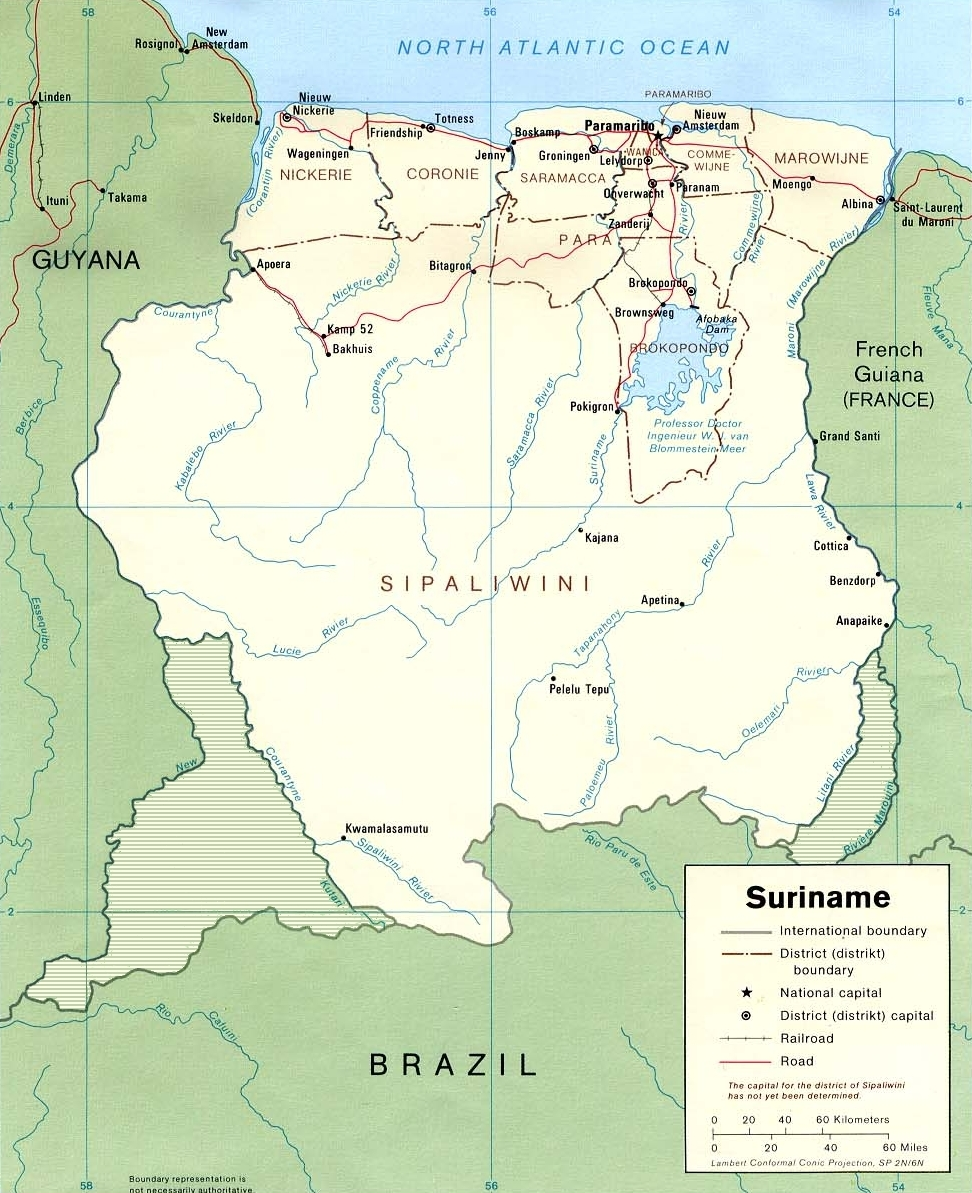
Rivers of Suriname

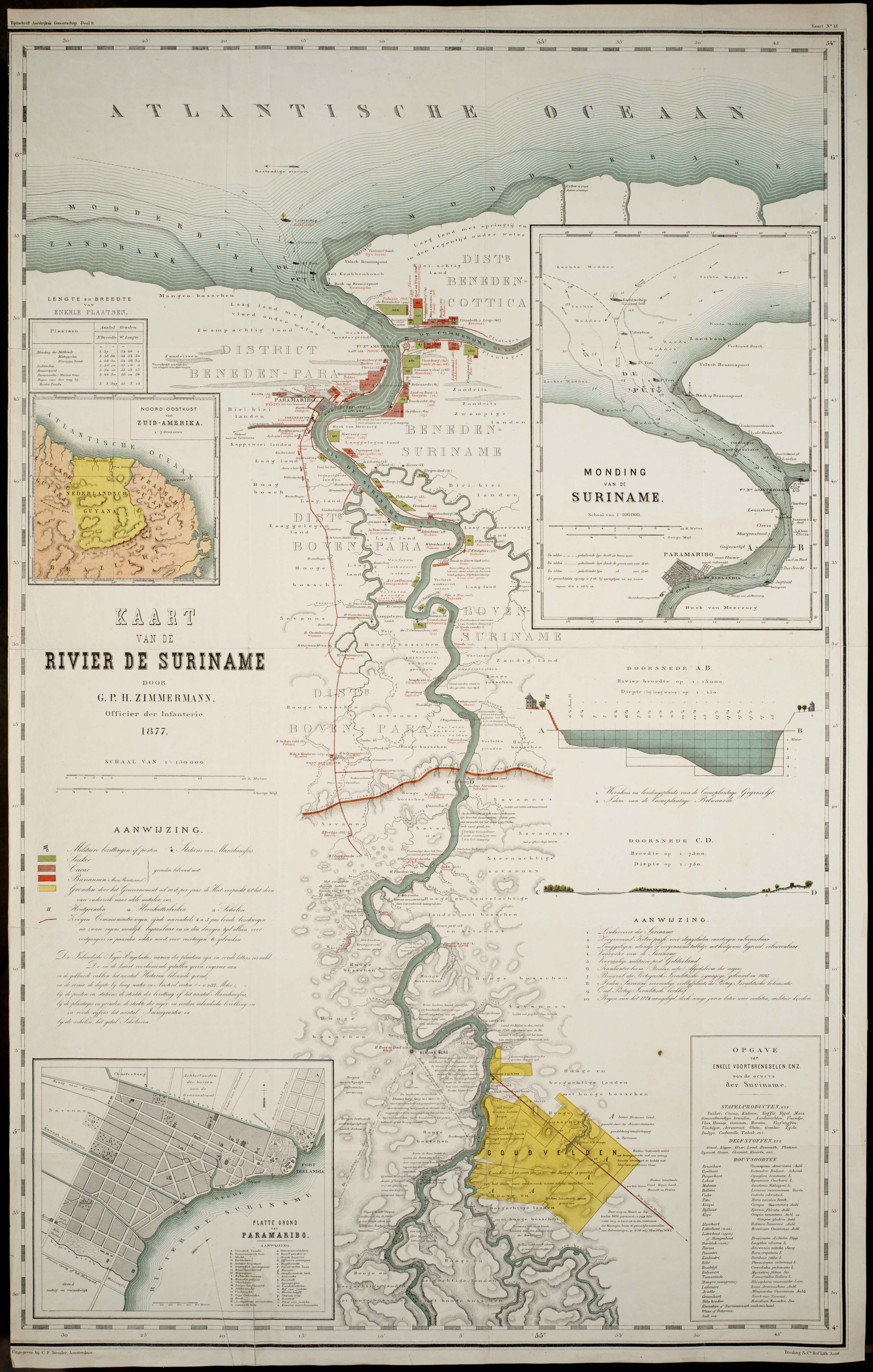
Map of the Suriname River in 1877, preserved in the Surinamese Museum in Paramaribo.

== By drainage basin ==
This list is arranged by drainage basin, with respective tributaries indented under each larger stream's name.

=== Atlantic Ocean ===
- Marowijne River
  - Tapanahony River
    - Paloemeu River
  - Gonini River
  - Lawa River
    - Litani River
      - Oelemari River
      - Marowijnekreek
- Suriname River
  - Commewijne River
    - Cottica River
  - Para Creek
    - Cola Creek
  - Brokopondo Reservoir
    - Sara Creek
    - Gran Rio
    - Pikin Rio
- Saramacca River
- Coppename River
  - Coesewijne River
  - Wayambo River
- Nickerie River
  - Wayambo River
- Corantijn River
  - Kabalebo River
  - Lucie River
  - Boven Corantijn River
  - Oronoque River
  - Sipaliwini River
  - Kutari River
- Coeroeni River
