= Kasuela =

Kasuela Cashew Island
- Village
- Location in Guyana
- Coordinates: 3°16′39″N 57°35′58″W
- Country: Guyana
- Region: East Berbice-Corentyne

Government
  - Toshao: Kenke Jaimo

Population (2014)
  - Total: 80
- Time zone: UTC-4
- Climate: Af

Kasuela (also Cashew Island, Kasjoe Eiland and Casuela) is an Indigenous village of the Tiriyó people in the East Berbice-Corentyne region of Guyana. The village has a population of about 80 people. The inhabitants are of the subgroup Mawayana or the Frog people.

The village is located inside the disputed Tigri Area.

== History ==
Kasuela is the oldest village of Western Trio Group and is located on an island in the middle of the New River. Camp Jaguar known in Suriname as Camp Tigri is located about four kilometres (2 1/2 miles) north of the village. The first settlers were Tiriyó from Kwamalasamutu in Suriname. In 1997, a Wai-wai family from Akotopono joined the village.

== Overview ==
In 2011, a school was opened in the village. In 2020, the village received access to health care. As of 2018, Kasuela was not connected to the telephone network or internet. The inhabitants are allowed to vote in both the Surinamese elections, as well as the Guyanese elections, however the village did not participate in the 2018 village council elections, because they preferred to choose their leaders in the traditional way.

Kasuela can be accessed via the river or by the airstrip located at Camp Jaguar.

== Language ==
The Mawayana subgroup originally spoke the Mawayana language which has already been replaced by the Tiriyó language. The last two speakers are in Kwamalasamutu as of 2015. The transition to Tiriyó was voluntary and a result of banding together in larger villages. The school has already stated that it will teach the children in the English language.
