= West Suriname Plan =

Economic development plan

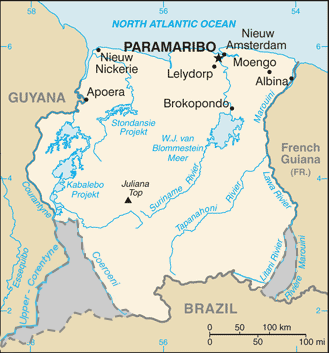
The Kabalebo Dam project is already indicated on this CIA World Factbook map. Disputed borders of Suriname are not marked

The West Suriname Plan (Dutch: West-Surinameplan) was an economic development plan for the western part of Suriname. As originally conceived, it consists among others of the mining of bauxite in the Bakhuis Mountains, the building of a hydroelectric power plant on the Kabalebo River, and the construction of a harbour and an aluminium smelter at Apoera. The plan was the brainchild of former Surinamese Minister of Development Frank Essed.

== Overview ==
In 1963, Operation Grasshopper found bauxite deposits in the Bakhuis Mountains. Two years later, extensive explorations were conducted by Suralco and Billiton. After a commercial joint venture established by Reynolds Surinam Mines and Grassalco failed to take off, the Surinamese government devised the West Suriname Plan to develop the region by the government.

=== False start ===
The Dutch government agreed to help execute the plan as part of the development subsidies to be given after Suriname would gain independence in 1975. Between 1976 and 1978, a railroad was constructed between Apoera and the Bakhuis Mountains by Morrison–Knudsen as main contractor and local companies as sub contractors.

After the 1980 Surinamese coup d'état Dutch development funds were frozen, and the project was halted. Low bauxite market prices in the 1980s also led to doubts about the economic feasibility of the project.

=== New plans ===
In the late 1990s, the West Suriname Plan was resurrected. On 6 January 2003, BHP Billiton, Suralco, and the Surinamese government signed two memorandum of understanding to investigate the possibility of developing bauxite mining in West Suriname. Talks between the Surinamese government and BHP Billiton stranded in October 2008. Nevertheless, the Surinamese government continues to be eager to develop Western Suriname and posits that interest in the Bakhuis Mountains exploration has been expressed by companies in Switzerland and China.
