= Kutari River =

Small tributary river in Suriname

Kutari Cutari
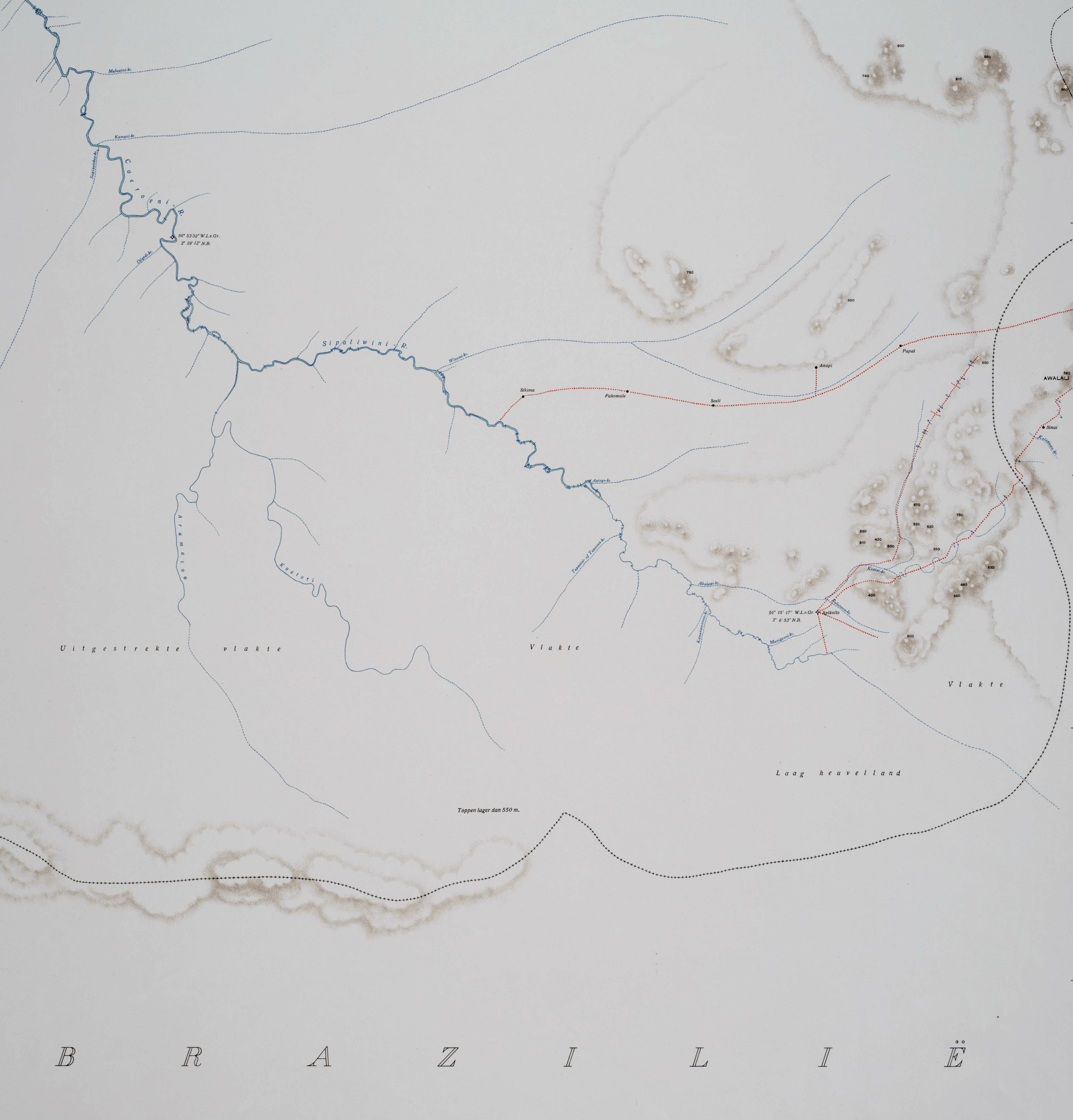
- Armamatau, Kutari and Sipaliwini River, with Kutari as southern east border of the Tigri Area, map from 1930

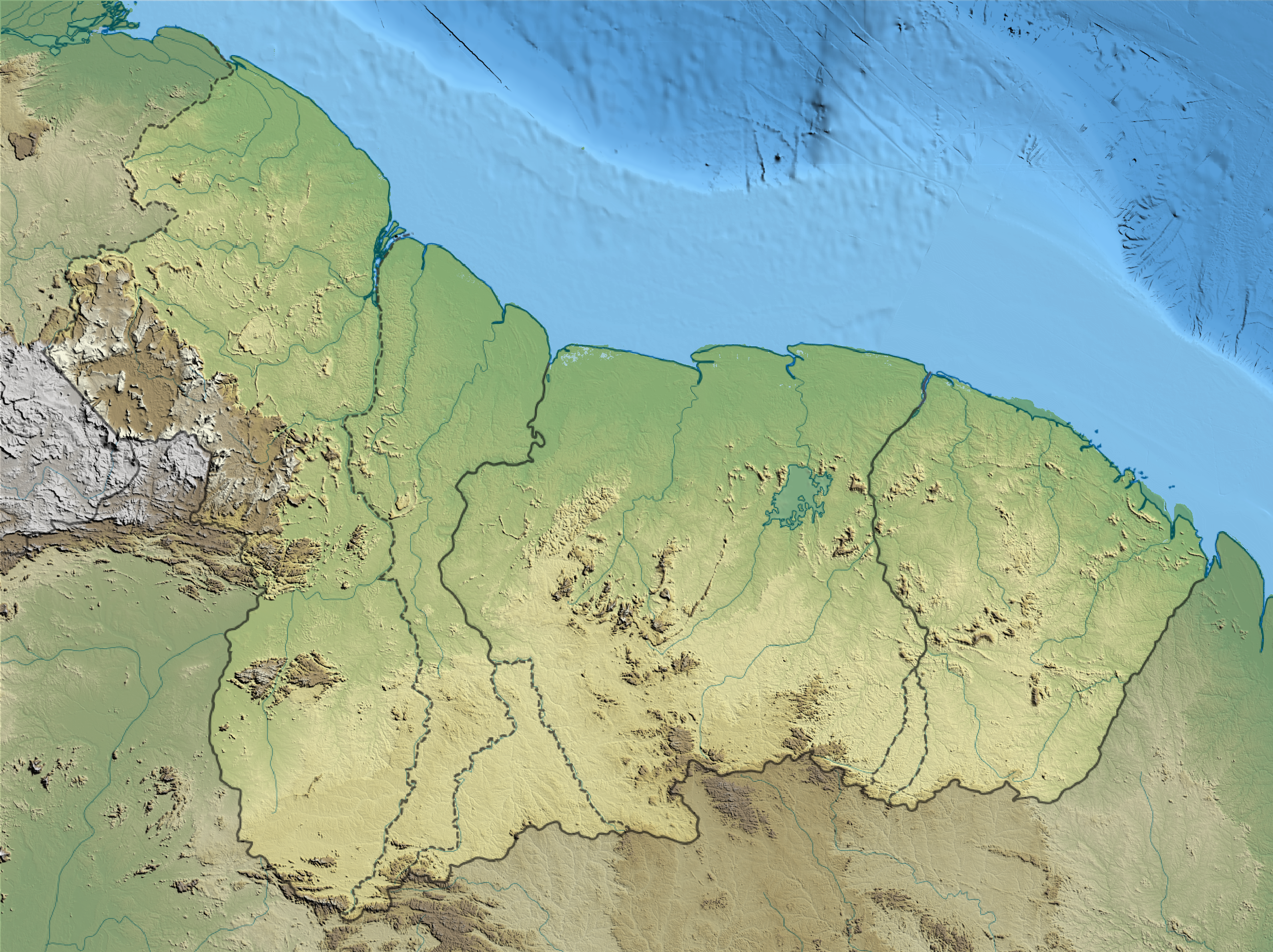

Location
- Country: Guyana, Suriname

Physical characteristics
- Mouth: Coeroeni River
  - location: Sipaliwini River
  - coordinates: 2°20′32″N 56°52′4″W

Kutari River, also called Cutari Rivier, Kutari Creek or Cutari Creek, is a small river on the southeastern border of Guyana and the southwestern region of Suriname. The location of the river is part of the disputed Tigri Area in the extreme South East region of Suriname.

The river has its source in the Acarai Mountains that border Brazil. Together with the Sipaliwini River the Kutari flows out in the Coeroeni River, where the village of Kwamalasamutu is within ten kilometers eastwards as the crow flies. To the north, the Kutari and the Coeroenie successively form the rivers on the eastern border of the Tigri Area. According to Guyana and the United Kingdom, this is the frontier of both countries; according to Suriname the border must be drawn at the New River.

== See also ==
- List of rivers of Guyana
- List of rivers of Suriname
- Borders of Suriname
