= Camp Tigri =

Guyanese military base in an area disputed with Suriname

- Camp Jaguar
- Kasuela, Tigri Area

Site information
- Type: Military camp / airstrip

Location
- Location within Guyana
- Coordinates: 3.3138°N 57.5892°W

Site history
- In use: 1968 to present

Garrison information
- Occupants: Guyana Defence Force

Camp Tigri or Camp Jaguar is a military camp and airstrip located in the Tigri Area. The area is disputed between Suriname and Guyana.

Camp Tigri was constructed in 1968 by the Surinamese Defence Police. On 19 August 1969 there was a skirmish between the Defence Police and the Guyana Defence Force during which Camp Tigri was captured. The camp was subsequently renamed to Camp Jaguar. It is located about 4 kilometres (2.5 mi) north of the indigenous village of Kasuela.

== History ==
In 1871 a dispute arose between Great Britain and the Netherlands regarding the border between British Guiana and Suriname. Great Britain considered the Kutari River the border river while the Netherlands disagreed and argued that the New River constituted the border. There were several attempts at negotiation, however the status quo remained. In 1961, the Coeroenie Airstrip was built by Suriname on the edge of the Tigri Area.

On 26 May 1966, British Guiana gained independence as Guyana, and the friendly relations between Suriname and Guyana rapidly deteriorated. In June 1966, the negotiations between the Netherlands, Guyana and Great Britain regarding the border broke down.

In 1967, Surinamese workers of the Bureau Waterkrachtwerken (Office of Hydroelectric Works) arrived in Camp Oronoque, a camp on the Oronoque River which was built in 1936, to construct a weir. On 10 December 1967, a seaplane landed, and the pilot told the workers that they were trespassing on Guyanese soil. The remark was ignored, and the pilot left. On 12 December, four armed policemen arrived and ordered the workmen to leave the area. The workmen subsequently left.

The Surinamese government requested military assistance from the Netherlands which was refused. In 1968, the Defence Police was established by the Surinamese prime minister Jopie Pengel and mainly consisted of former soldiers of the Netherlands Armed Forces in Suriname (TRIS). Four camps were established which included Camp Tigri near rapids of the Courantyne River. On 19 August 1969, two airplanes of the Guyana Defence Force (GDF) landed in the vicinity of the camp. An exchange of gunfire followed. There were no casualties or wounded, but Margo van Dams was captured by Guyana. The GDF conquered the camp, and changed the name to Camp Jaguar. Van Dams was later released.

The existence of Camp Jaguar used to be officially denied. In 2014, a soldier drowned when his boat capsized, and the existence of the military camp was confirmed. Since then, Camp Jaguar is mentioned in the press.

An airstrip is located south of the camp.
