= Treaty of Limits =

A Treaty of Limits is a treaty that establishes or confirms a border between two countries. It may refer to:

- Treaty of Limits (Brazil–Netherlands), 1906 treaty establishing the border between Brazil and Suriname
- Treaty of Limits (Mexico–United States), 1828 treaty confirming the border between Mexico and the United States
