= Coeroeni River =

River in Brazil and Suriname

Coeroeni
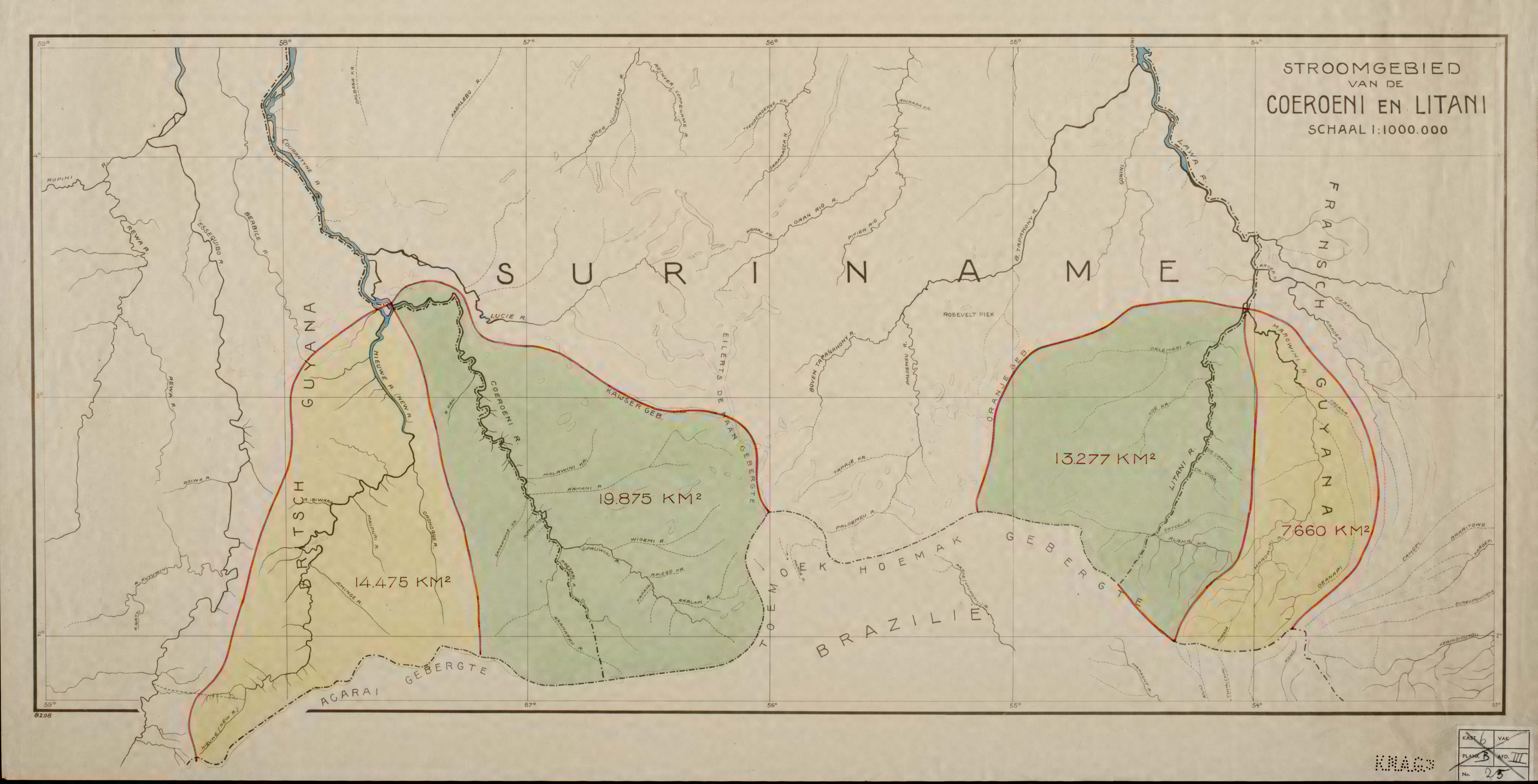
- Coeroeni is the middle on the left.

- Location of mouth

Physical characteristics
- Source: Confluence of the Sipaliwini and Kutari River
  - coordinates: 2.3447°N 56.8730°W
- Mouth: Courentyne River
  - coordinates: 3.3688°N 57.6514°W

The Coeroeni River is a river in South America. It arises in the Tumuc-Humac Mountains, which forms the drainage divide between Pará, Brazil, and Suriname; from there it flows northward. The river is fed by the Aramatau, Kutari and Sipaliwini River. The Coeroeni goes on to form the border of the disputed Tigri Area by Guyana and Suriname. It eventually flows into the Courantyne River, which forms the international boundary between Guyana–Suriname.

While there's little dispute of the lower Corentyne marking the division between the two countries, however confusion arose where the river splits to the west as the New River or the east Coeroeni. Which one is deemed the proper upper Corentyne was between the expedition of Robert H. Schomburgk, and later Barrington Brown who found the New River.
