= Brazil–Suriname border =

International border

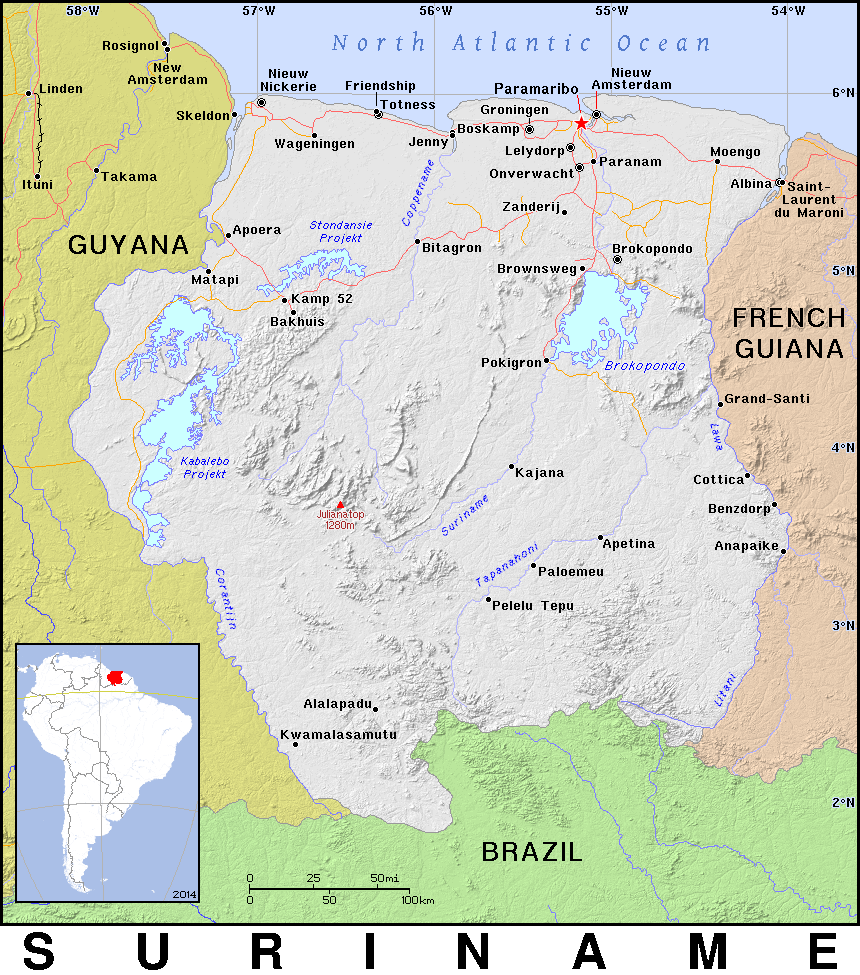
- Map of Suriname with the border with Brazil to the south

Characteristics
- Entities: Brazil; Suriname
- Length: 593 km (368 mi)

History
- Established: 1906
- Current shape: 1938
- Treaties: Treaty of Limits (Brazil–Netherlands)

The Brazil–Suriname border is the international border between Brazil and Suriname and has a length of 593 km (368 mi). It is the shortest international border that Brazil has with its neighbors. The Surinamese side of the border is made up entirely of Sipaliwini, the largest district in the country. The Brazilian side of the border is almost entirely contained by Pará, with only 52 km of the border in the east with Amapá.

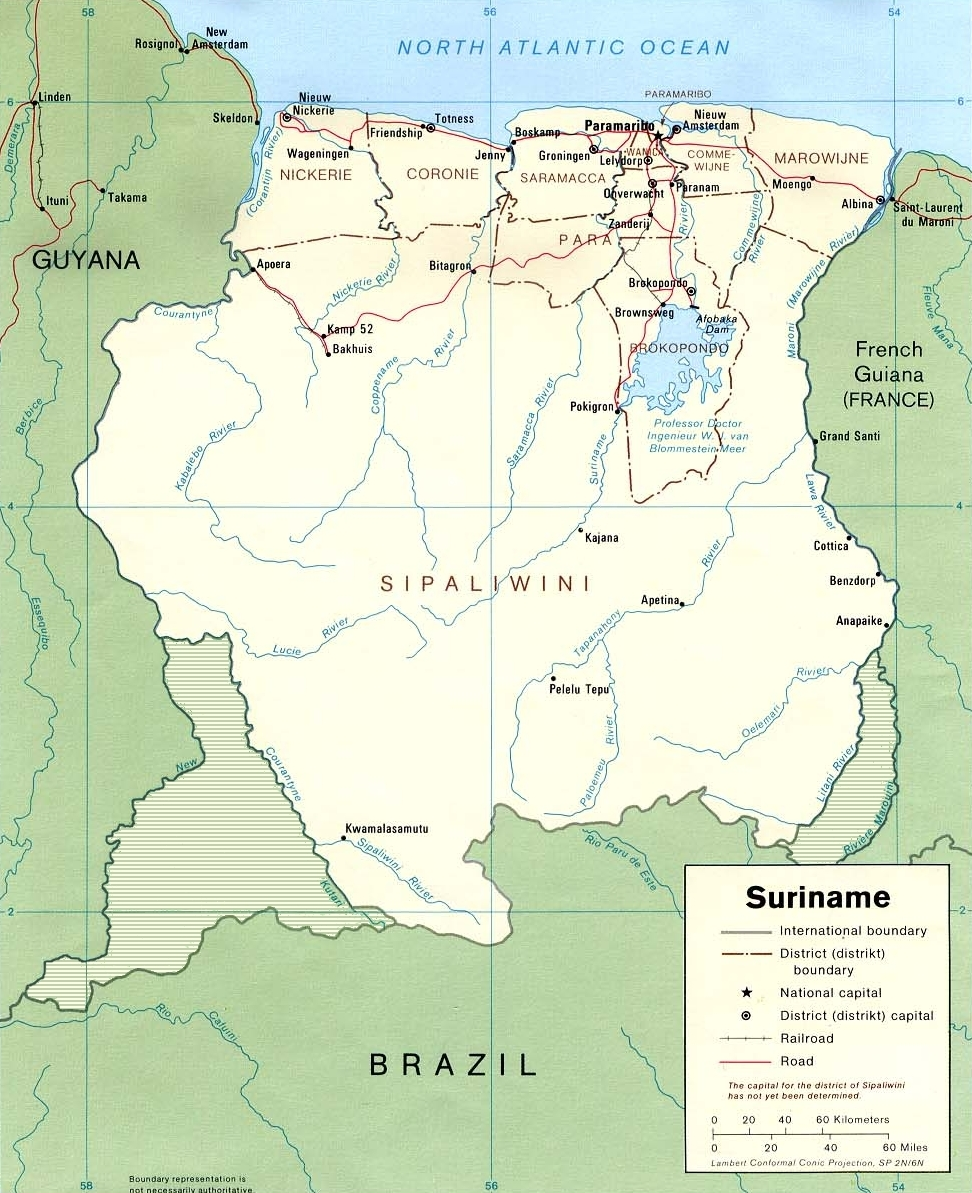
Suriname with the disputed areas.

== Characteristics ==
The border runs between two triple points with Guyana in the west and French Guiana in the east. The border region between Brazil and Suriname is extremely isolated, with only a few indigenous villages and malocas on the riverbanks.

On the Surinamese side of the border, the nearest town is Kwamalasamutu.

=== Drainage divide ===
The dividing line between the countries is a classic example of a border division agreement by drainage divide, in which there is no sharing of hydrographic basins between the two countries, and the border is therefore totally dry. Thus, Suriname does not have access to the rivers of the Amazon basin, which flow to the south, nor does Brazil have access to the rivers of the Corantyne and Maroni basins, which flow to the northern coast, part of the Atlantic that borders the Guianas.

== History ==
Early colonial outposts in South America, especially in the Guianas, were largely confined to the coast and rivers. The dense Amazon rainforest made the potential resource exploitation that drove the French, English, Dutch, Spanish, and Portuguese to colonize the region difficult due to the difficulty in traversing the terrain. This led to the borders between the inner Amazonian regions of Suriname, then a colony of the Netherlands called Surinam, and Brazil not being formally demarcated until several centuries after their presence in the region.

Interest in formally defining where the border between the two nations lay began in the second half of the 19th century with negotiations between Venezuela, Britain, France, and Brazil regarding the borders of French Guiana. The Dutch had maintained friendly relations with Brazil since its independence from Portugal and requested that they wait to define their shared border to not upset France or the United Kingdom who were interested in the unclaimed Amazonian region. Once Brazil signed treaties with France (1900) and the United Kingdom (1904) to define its northern borders, the Dutch signed the Treaty of Limits defining the borders of Suriname with Brazil on May 5, 1906. This treaty was ratified in The Hague on September 15, 1908. The treaty defined the border as being:

"formed from the French border French Guiana to the British border British Guiana, the line of the watershed between the Amazon basin to the south, and the basins of the rivers flowing into north to the Atlantic Ocean."

The institution of two commissions, one Brazilian and one Dutch, who would work together to define the border was signed on September 22, 1931, but their institution was delayed until 1934. The Dutch commission was led by Dutch Boundary Commissioner Vice Admiral Conrad Carel Käyser and the Brazilian commission was led by Brás de Aguiar. The two groups of commissioners faced various challenges in locating where to place the border due to varying seasonal currents during rainy seasons, watersheds following unusual routes, and lack of local knowledge. The two commissions came to a concession on April 30, 1938, in Belém with their report stating that "the frontier measures 593 kilometres and that 59 border marks had been placed to mark it".
