= Lucie River =

River in Suriname

Location
- Country: Suriname
- District: Sipaliwini District

Physical characteristics
- Source: Eilerts de Haan Mountains
  - location: 3.5782°N 56.2459°W
- Mouth: Courantyne River
  - location: 3.5690°N 57.6838°W

Basin features
- Progression: Courantyne River→Atlantic Ocean

Lucie River is a river of Suriname. It feeds into the Atlantic Ocean as well as the Courantyne River. The river was discovered and named by Eilerts de Haan in 1908. Eilerts de Haan is buried near the river.

== See also ==
- List of rivers of Suriname
