= Gonini River =

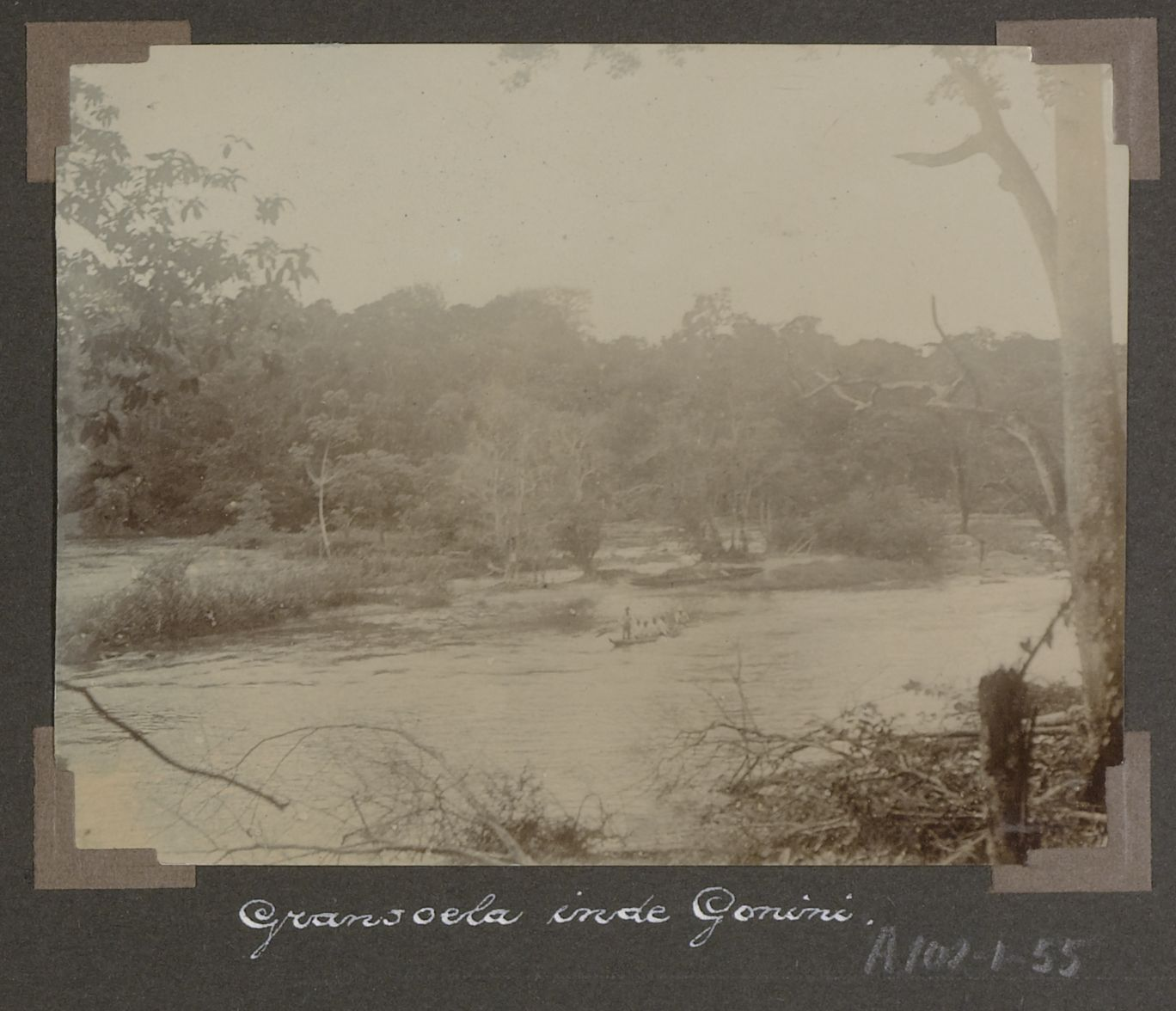
- Gransoela in the Gonini River (1904)

Location
- Country: Suriname

Physical characteristics
- Source
  - coordinates: 3.8439°N 54.5284°W
- Mouth: Lawa River
  - coordinates: 4.1651°N 54.3843°W
- Length: ~100 km

Gonini River is a river of Suriname which flows into the Lawa River near Mofina in French Guiana. The river is formed from a confluence between the Wilhelmina River and the Emma River. Both rivers are sourced from the Oranjegebergte which in turn is a subdivision of the Tumuk Humak Mountains. The area was first explored by A. Franssen Herderschee in 1903. The river is home to the Koloegado, Lenabari, Makoe-makoe, and Kotilolo waterfalls.

== See also ==
- List of rivers of Suriname
