= Kabalebo River =

Coordinates: 5°02′N 57°21′W

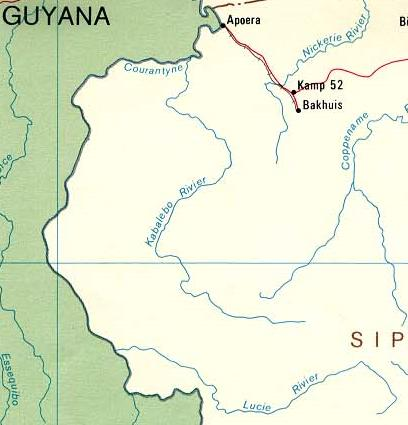
- The Kabalebo River in Suriname

Location
- Country: Suriname

Physical characteristics
- Mouth
  - location: Courantyne River

Kabalebo River is a river in Suriname. It joins with the Courantyne River near Apoera. A plan for a dam in the river serving a hydroelectric power plant is part of the West Suriname Plan of the 1960s. As of 2020, no construction had taken place. Petroglyphs had been discovered on a rock by Ten Kate in 1886.

== See also ==
- List of rivers of Suriname
