= Charles Barrington Brown =

Canadian geologist and explorer

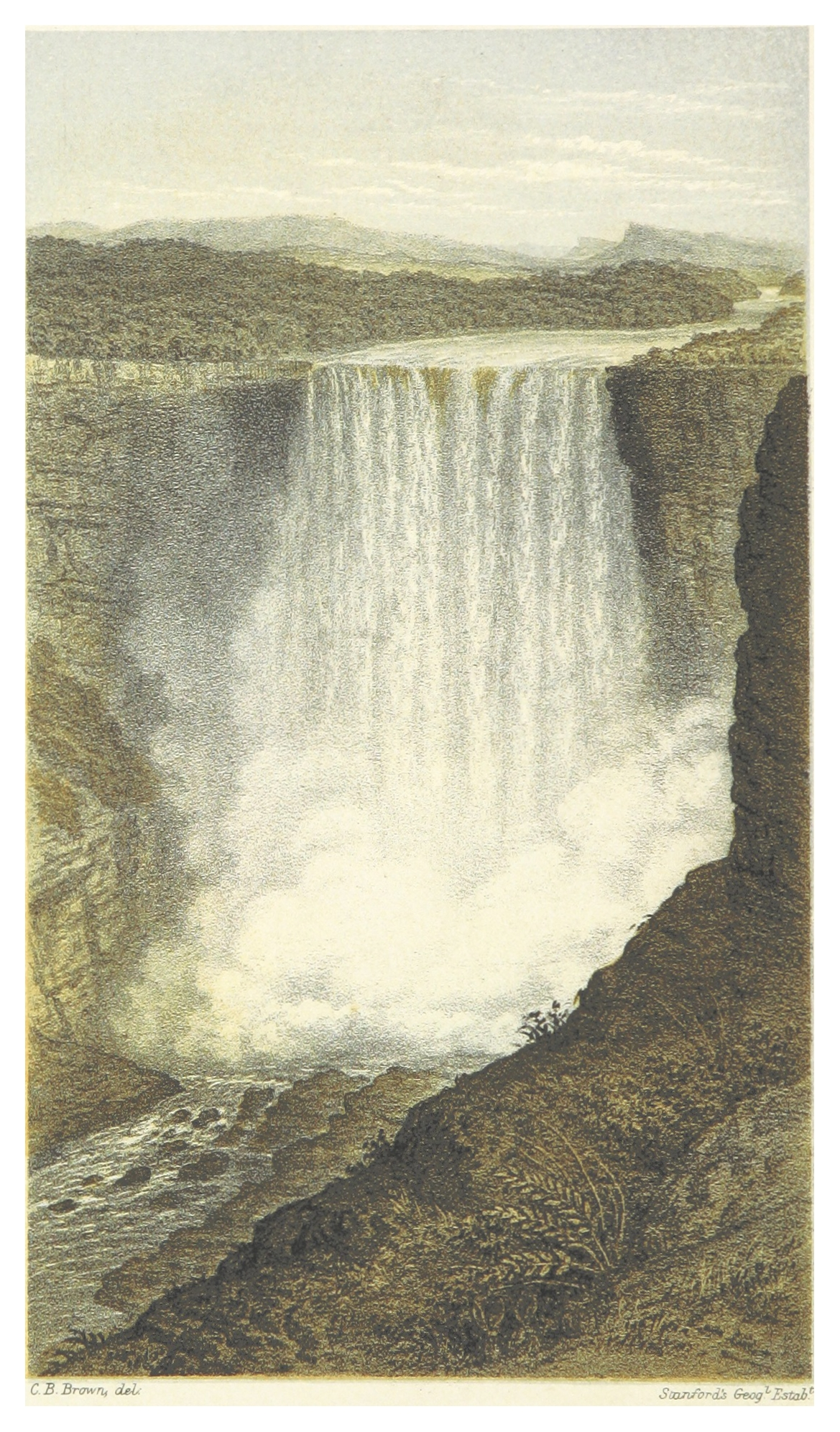
Illustration of Kaieteur Falls from Canoe and Camp Life in British Guiana

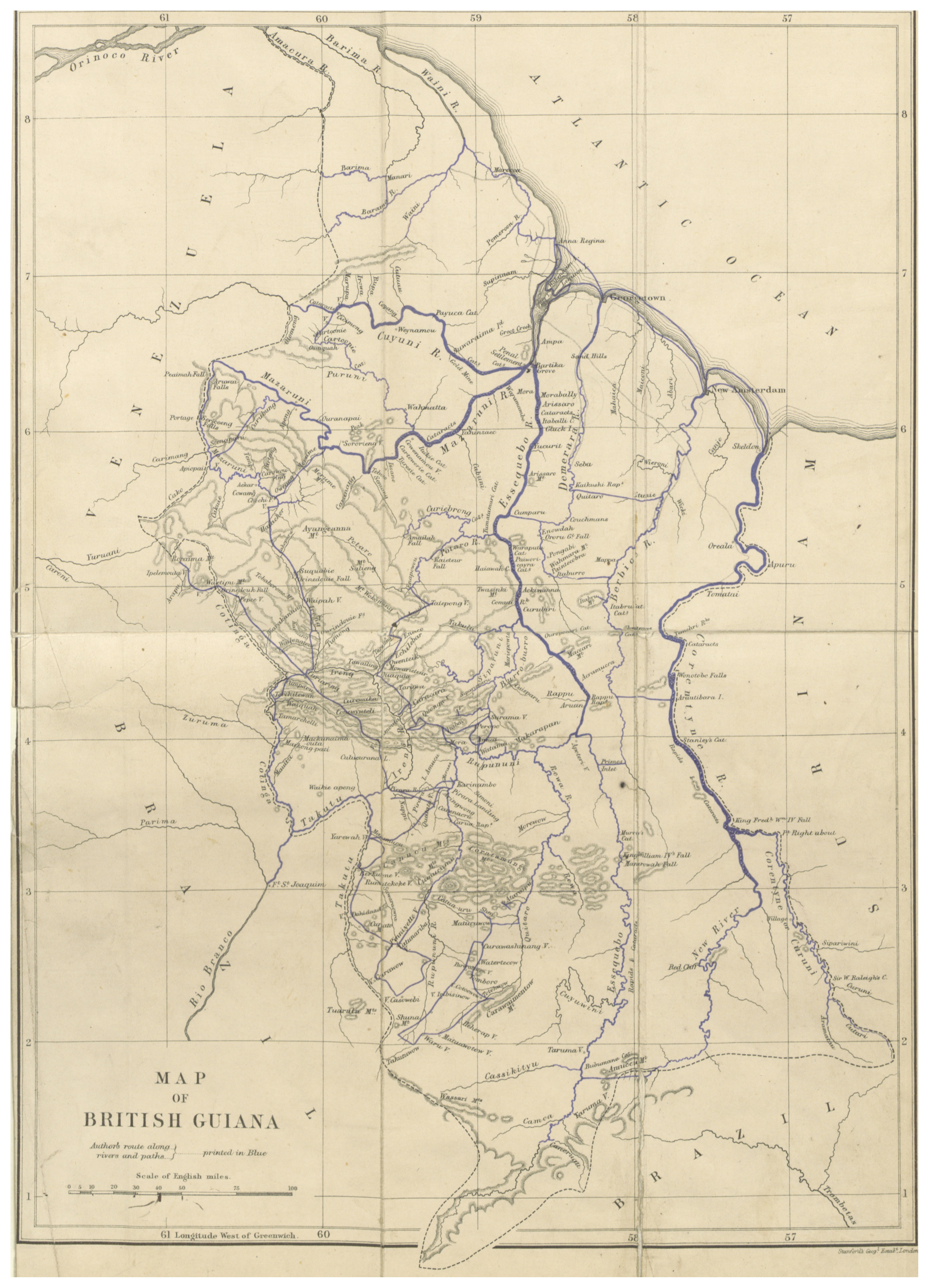
Map of British Guiana from Canoe and Camp Life in British Guiana

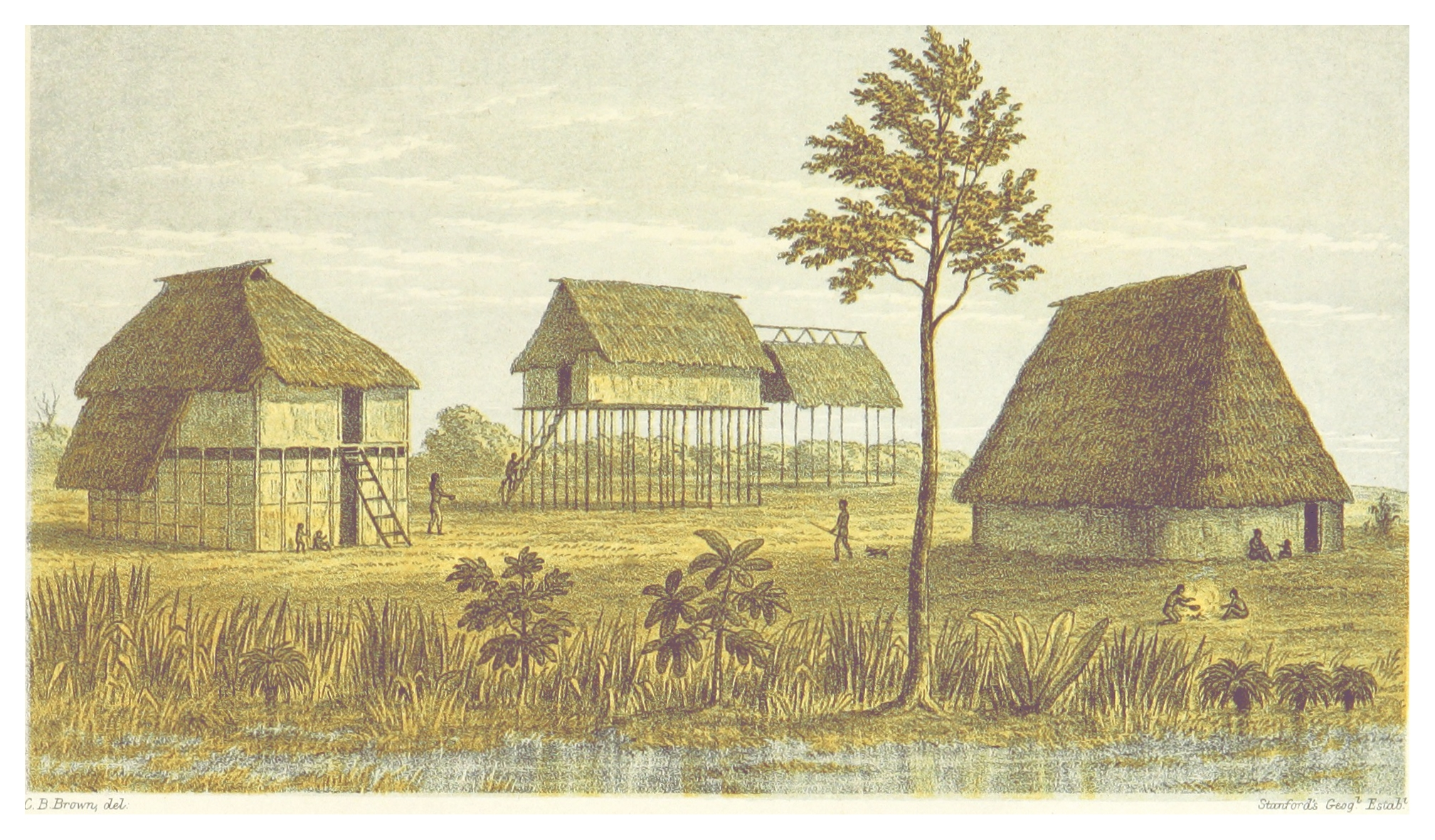
Illustration of Karinambo form Canoe and Camp Life in British Guiana

Charles Barrington Brown (23 August 1839, Cape Breton Island – 13 February 1917, London) was a Canadian geologist and explorer. On April 24, 1870, he was one of two English-based geologists appointed government surveyors to the colony of British Guiana (now known as Guyana). That same year, he was the first Westerner to see Kaieteur Falls. The other surveyor was James Sawkins.

Brown and Sawkins arrived in Georgetown in 1867 and did some of their mapping and preparation of geological reports together and some in separate expeditions. Sawkins took a break from his work when Brown came upon Kaieteur Falls. In 1871, Brown discovered the New River, which he deemed the true source of the Courantyne. This gave rise to the New River Triangle border dispute between Suriname and British Guiana (now Guyana) was born. Barrington also visited Mount Roraima on the border between Brazil and Venezuela and was the first to describe the Tök-Wasen, a rock cliff formation located at the southern end of the mountain and suggested ascending it by balloon.

Brown was educated at Harvard University, and at the Royal School of Mines, London (1862–1864), taking his associateship in Geology.

== Bibliography ==
- Canoe and Camp Life in British Guiana (1876)
- Fifteen thousand miles on the Amazon and Its tributaries, Charles Barrington Brown and William Lidstone, E. Stanford, 1878, 520 pp.
- Structure and area: a book of field geology Charles Barrington Brown and Frank Debenham, E. Arnold & co. 1929, 168 pp.
- Reports on the Physical, Descriptive, and Economic Geology of British Guiana, Charles Barrington Brown and James Gay Sawkins, Nabu (repr. 2010), 328 pp. (ISBN 9781178365047)
