= Tigri Area =

Disputed area between Guyana and Suriname

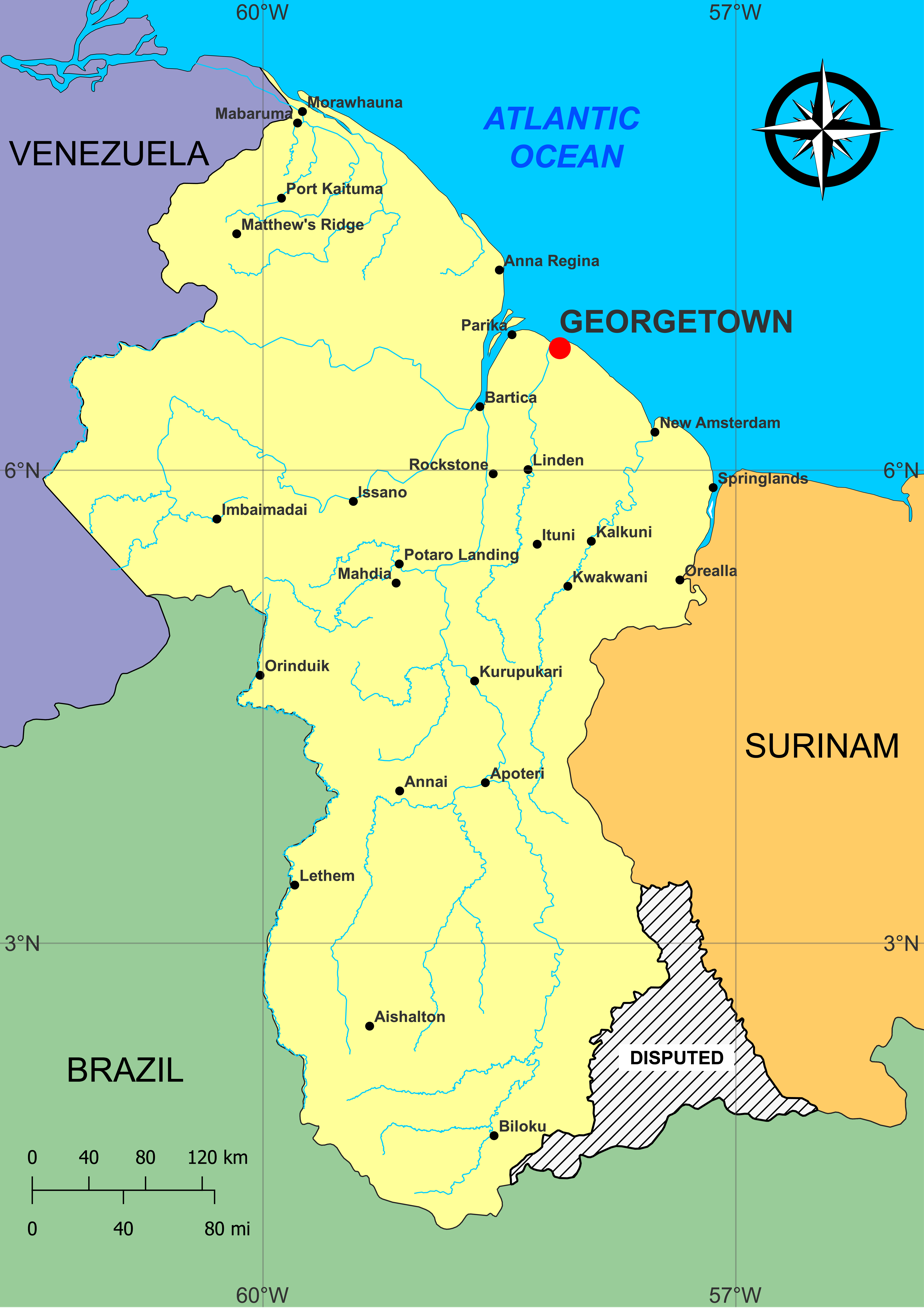
Disputed region between currently administered by Guyana but claimed by Suriname

The Tigri Area (Dutch: Tigri-gebied), also known as the New River Triangle, is a forested region administered by Guyana as part of the East Berbice-Corentyne region. Since the 19th century the territory has been the subject of a sovereignty dispute between Guyana and Suriname. While Guyana exercises administrative control over the area, Suriname maintains a claim to the territory, considering it part of the Coeroeni Resort within its Sipaliwini District.

The area involves the area between the New River (renamed as the Upper Corentyne River by Suriname) and the Corentyne River which leads to the Kutari River at the border of Brazil. The Corentyne River was accepted as the natural border between these two countries until 1871 when Charles Barrington Brown discovered the New River. The dispute rests on the interpretation of the natural border, specifically whether the Kutari River or the New River is the source of the Corentyne River, despite both being tributaries. In 1969, three years after its independence, the Guyana Defence Force (GDF) seized full control of the disputed region when Suriname was still a constituent state of the Kingdom of the Netherlands.

== History ==
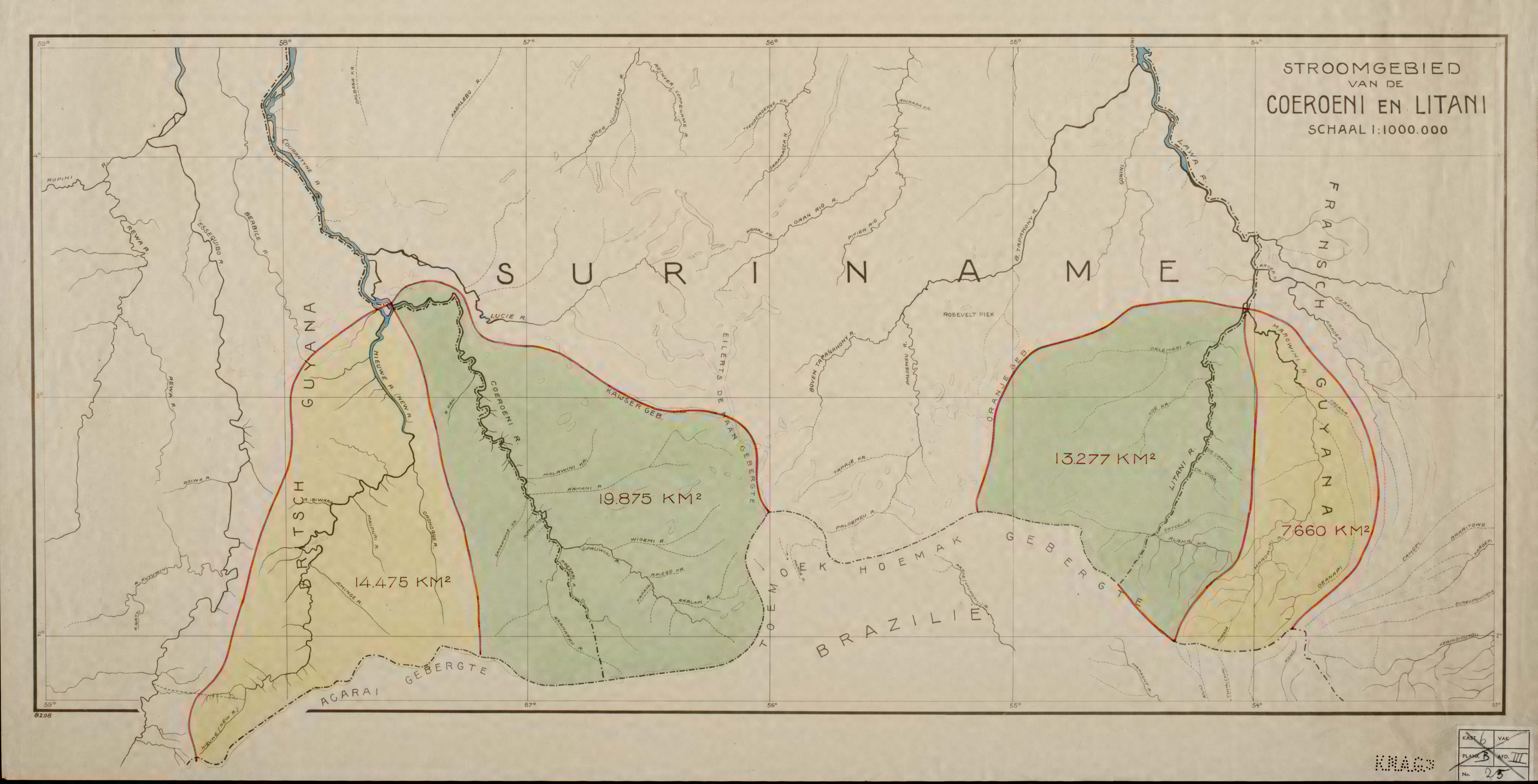
Suriname has territorial disputes with French Guiana and Guyana.

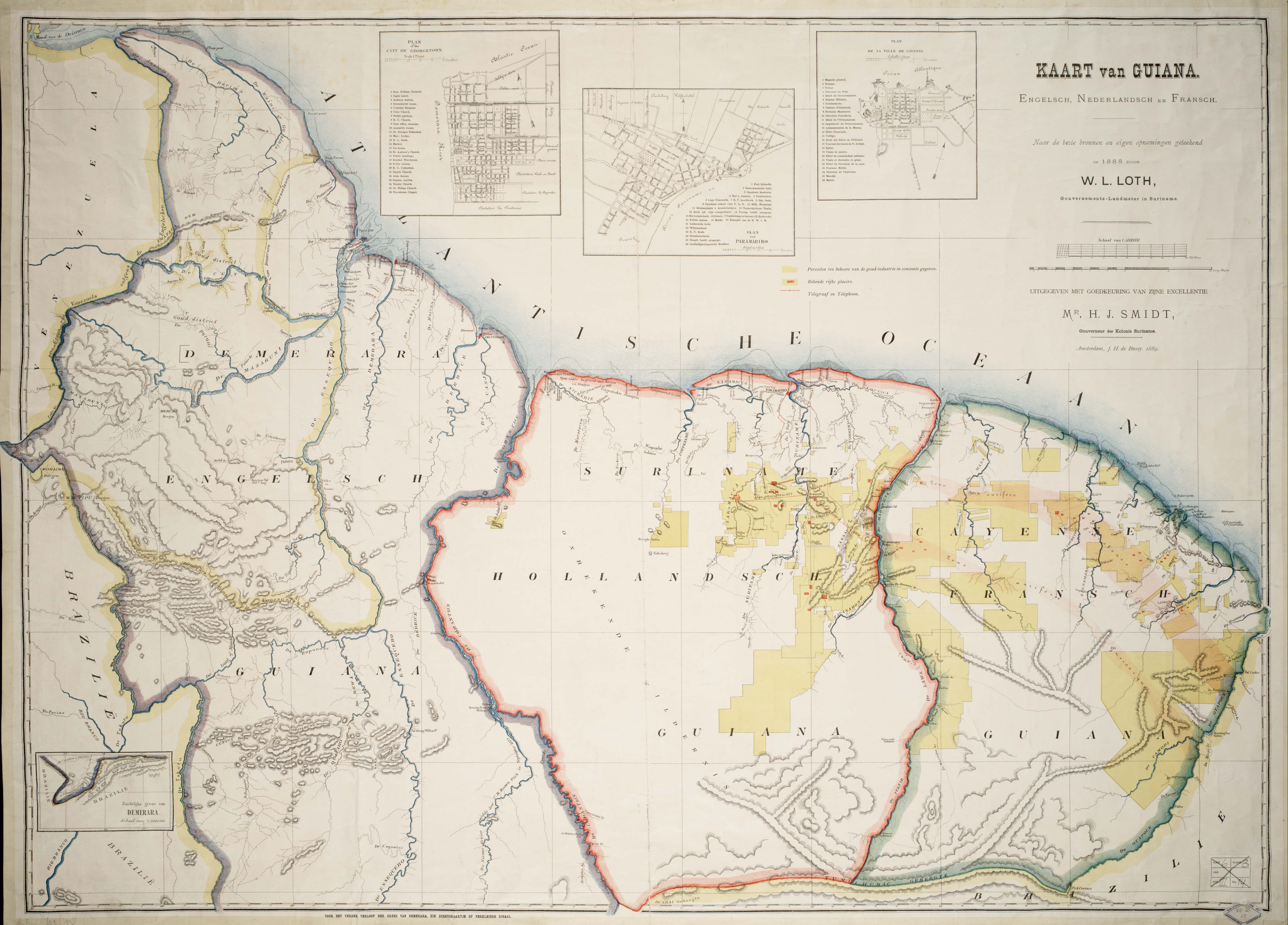
Map of Guianas in 1888, according to Surinamese surveyor Willem Lodewijk Loth.

The Anglo-Dutch Treaty of 1814 set the border between British Guiana and Suriname as the Courantyne River. The treaty was signed and ratified by both parties. Robert Schomburgk surveyed British Guiana's borders in 1840. Taking the Courantyne River as the border, he sailed up to which he deemed its source, the Kutari River, in order to delineate the boundary. In 1871, however, Charles Barrington Brown discovered the New River or Upper Corentyne, which he considered to be source of the Corentyne River. Thus the Tigri Area or New River Triangle dispute was born.

The southern border of the Tigri Area meets with the Brazilian state of Pará and, to establish this boundary, Brazil sought cooperation with Britain as they considered it under control of British Guiana and not the Netherlands. Later on, the Tri-junction Point Agreement would help establish the meeting point between what is now Brazil, Suriname, and Guyana.

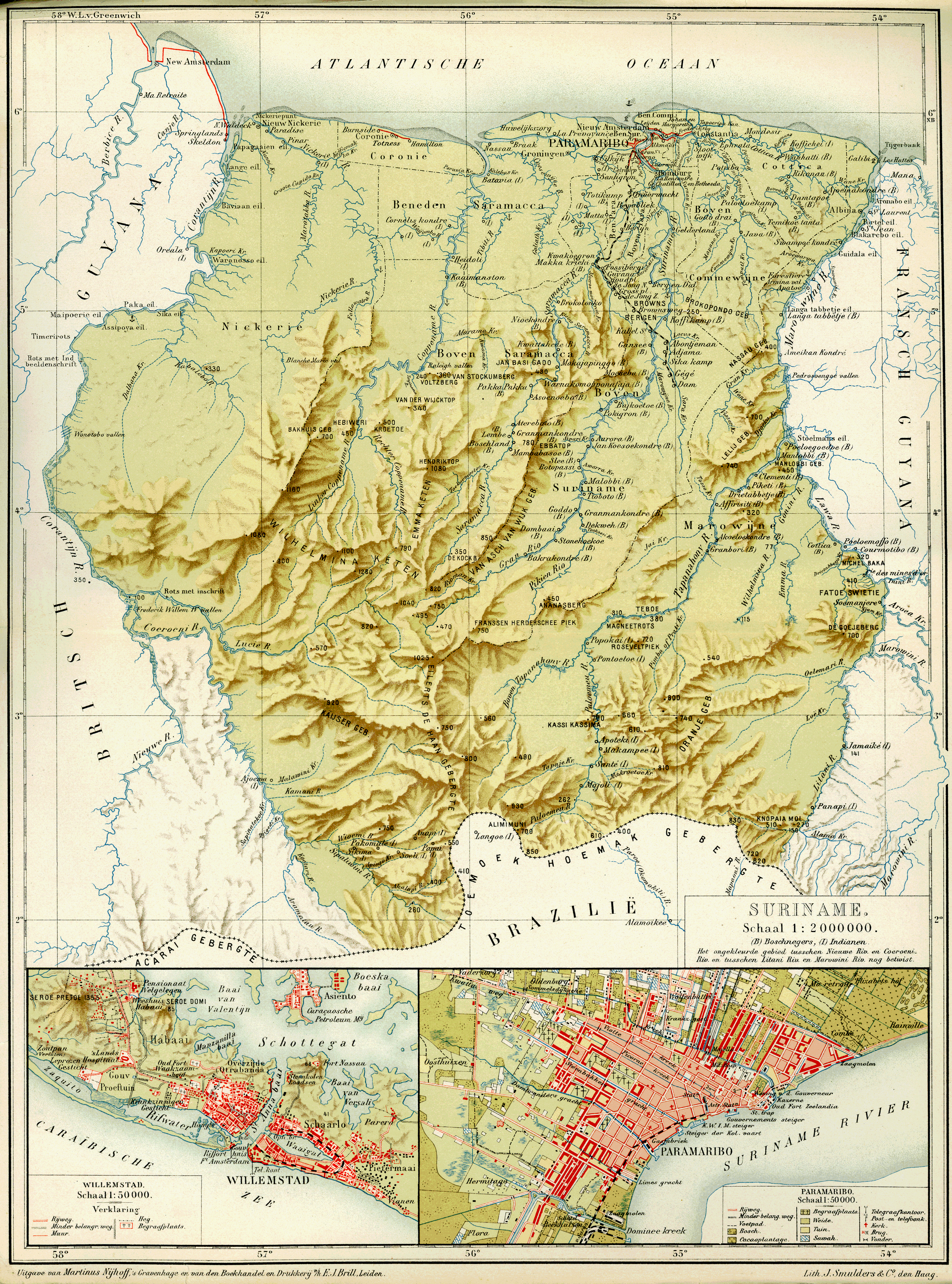
Suriname (circa 1914) in the Encyclopedia of the Dutch West Indies, by Surinamese cartographer Herman Benjamins and Dutch ethnographer Johannes Snelleman.

The tribunal which dealt with the Venezuela Crisis of 1895 also awarded the New River Triangle to British Guiana. The Netherlands, however, raised a diplomatic protest, claiming that the New River, and not the Kutari, was to be regarded as the source of the Corentyne and the boundary. The British government replied that the issue was already settled by the acceptance of the Kutari as the boundary.

In 1936, a Mixed Commission established by the British and Dutch government agreed to award the full width of the Corentyne River to Suriname, as per the 1799 agreement. The territorial sea boundary was deemed to prolongate 10° from Point No. 61, three nautical miles (5.6 km) from the shore. The New River Triangle, however, was completely awarded to Guyana. The treaty putting this agreement into law was never ratified, because of the outbreak of World War II. The Dutch representative Conrad Carel Käyser signed an agreement with British and Brazilian representatives, placing the tri-point junction near the source of the Kutari River. Desiring to put the border issue to a closure before British Guiana would gain independence, the British government restarted negotiations in 1961. The British position asserted "Dutch sovereignty over the Corentyne River, a 10° line dividing the territorial sea, and British control over the New River Triangle." The Netherlands replied with a formal claim to the New River Triangle, but with an additional thalweg boundary in the Corentyne River (the latter position has never been repeated by any Surinamese government). No agreements were made and Guyana became independent with its borders unresolved.

In the present village of Kuruni near the Coeroenie Airstrip, prefab houses were placed for workers on a planned weir. Work also began on a camp near the Oronoque River. On 12 December 1967, four armed men of the Guyana police force landed at Oronoque, and ordered the workers to leave the area. Four military posts were initially established by the Surinamese army, however (mainly for financial reasons) only Camp Tigri (also known as Camp Jaguar) remained. On 19 August 1969, border skirmishes occurred between Guyanese forces and Surinamese militias at Camp Tigri, which was subsequently conquered by Guyana. On 18 March 1970, Eric Williams, Prime Minister of Trinidad and Tobago offered to mediate the conflict. In November 1970 the Surinamese and Guyanese governments agreed in Trinidad and Tobago to withdraw their military forces from the Triangle. Guyana has not held upon this agreement and continue to occupy the New River Triangle. Prior to Suriname's independence in 1975, Surinamese prime minister Henck Arron asked his Dutch counterpart Joop den Uyl for a precise definition of the borders. The reply included the Tigri area.

== Villages ==
The indigenous villages of Kasuela and Sakuru of the Tiriyó tribe are located inside the Tigri area. Kasuela is the oldest village of Western Trio Group and is located on an island in the middle of the New River. The village is also known as Casuela, and Cashew Island. Camp Tigri known in Guyana as Camp Jaguar, is located to the north of the village.

The village of Sakuru was founded in 2008 by a group of people from Kwamalasamutu. It is located at 2°4′21″N 56°53′21″W.

== See also ==
- Guayana Esequiba, another territorial dispute involving Guyana
