= Oronoque River =

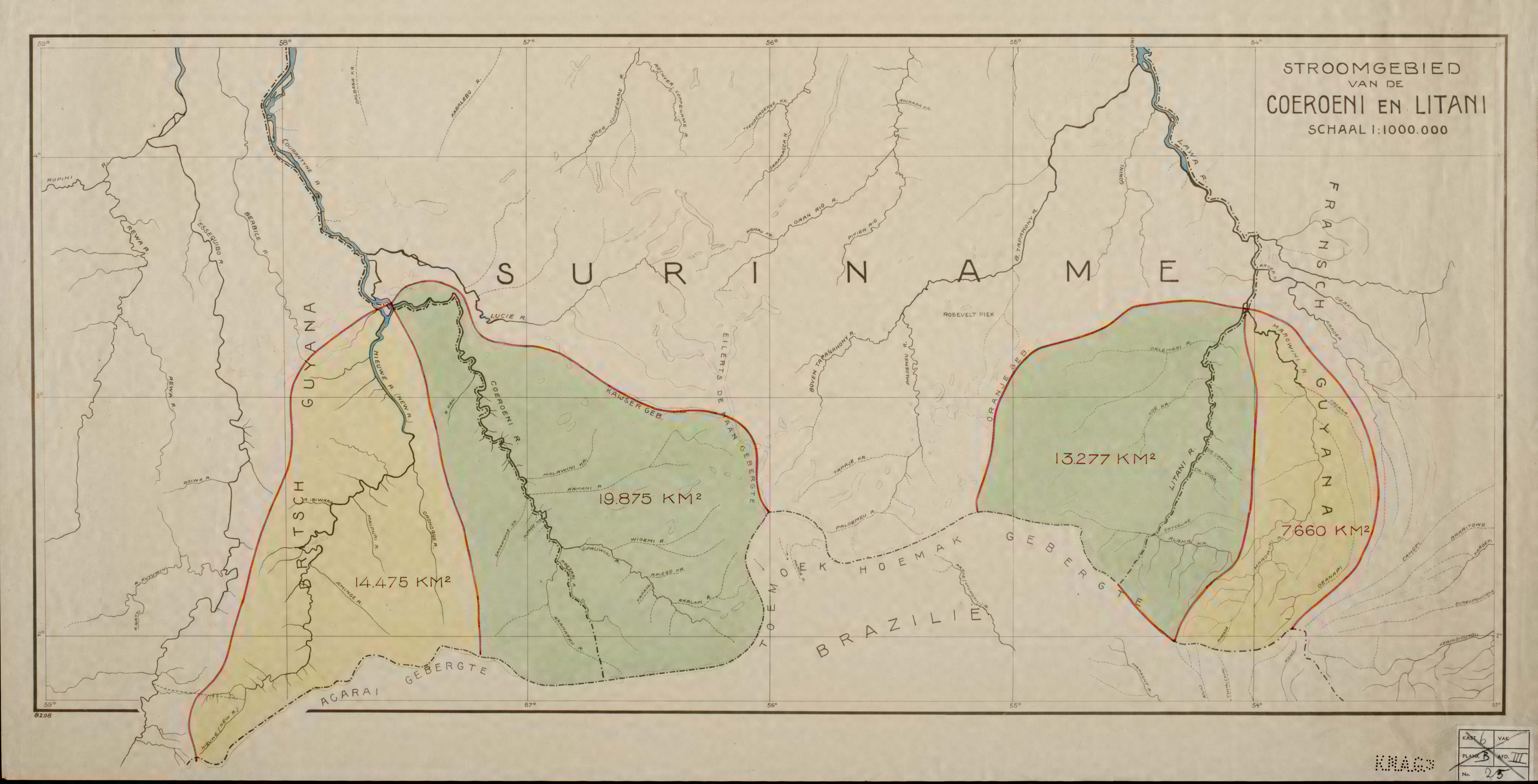
- Oronoque is on the left.

Physical characteristics
- Source
  - coordinates: 1.8246°N 57.6541°W
- Mouth: New River
  - coordinates: 2.7513°N 57.4355°W

The Oronoque River is a river in Guyana and a tributary of the New River. The river is located in the Tigri Area which is disputed between Guyana and Suriname. The source was discovered in September 1936, and is considered the international boundary with Brazil.

The Oronoque River was the location where border tensions between Guyana and Suriname started in 1967. A group of Surinamese work men had arrived at Camp Oronoque, a camp which had been established in British Guiana during a 1936 Surinamese expedition, to investigate the possibility of creating a reservoir. On 12 December 1967, four armed men of the Guyana police force landed and told the workers to leave Camp Oronoque which marked the beginning of the Tigri conflict, and resulted in an armed encounter at Camp Tigri.

Even though the river flows through an uninhabited area of rain forest, some illegal gold mining has taken place along the river.

== Bibliography ==
- Smith, Herbert Carrington (1940). On the frontier of British Guiana and Brazil. Smithsonian Institution.
