= Oelemari River =

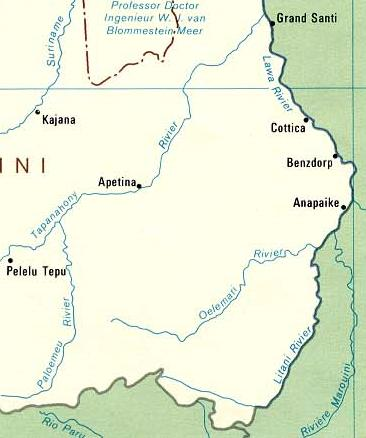
- Oelemari River

Location
- Country: Suriname

Physical characteristics
- Source
  - coordinates: 2.8031°N 55.0190°W
- Mouth: Litani
  - coordinates: 3.2155°N 54.1646°W

Oelemari River (also Ulemari) is a river of Suriname. The Oelemari River flows into the Litani which is a tributary to the Marowijne. The river is sourced from the Oranjegebergte which in turn is a subdivision of the Tumuk Humak Mountains. Gold has been discovered in the area and is being exploited by Guardian Exploration from Texas.

The area was first explored by A. Franssen Herderschee in 1903, and settlements had been found of the indigenous Ojarikoelé tribe, also known as Wajarikoele. In 1938, Willem Ahlbrinck set out on an expedition to find the tribe, but could find no settlements or the tribe, but did discover the Wama tribe also known as Akurio who were still living in the Stone Age. The Akurio were rediscovered in 1975 by American missionaries, and were persuaded to live in Pelelu Tepu.

The area can be reached from the Oelemari Airport.

== See also ==
- List of rivers of Suriname
