= Treaty of Limits (Brazil–Netherlands) =

1906 treaty between Brazil and the Netherlands

Treaty of Limits Traité de limites Grensverdrag Tratado de Limites
Traité entre les Pays-Bas et les États-Unis du Brésil, établissant la frontière entre Ie Brésil et la Colonie du Surinam. Treaty between the Netherlands and the United States of Brazil, establishing the border between Brazil and the Colony of Surinam.
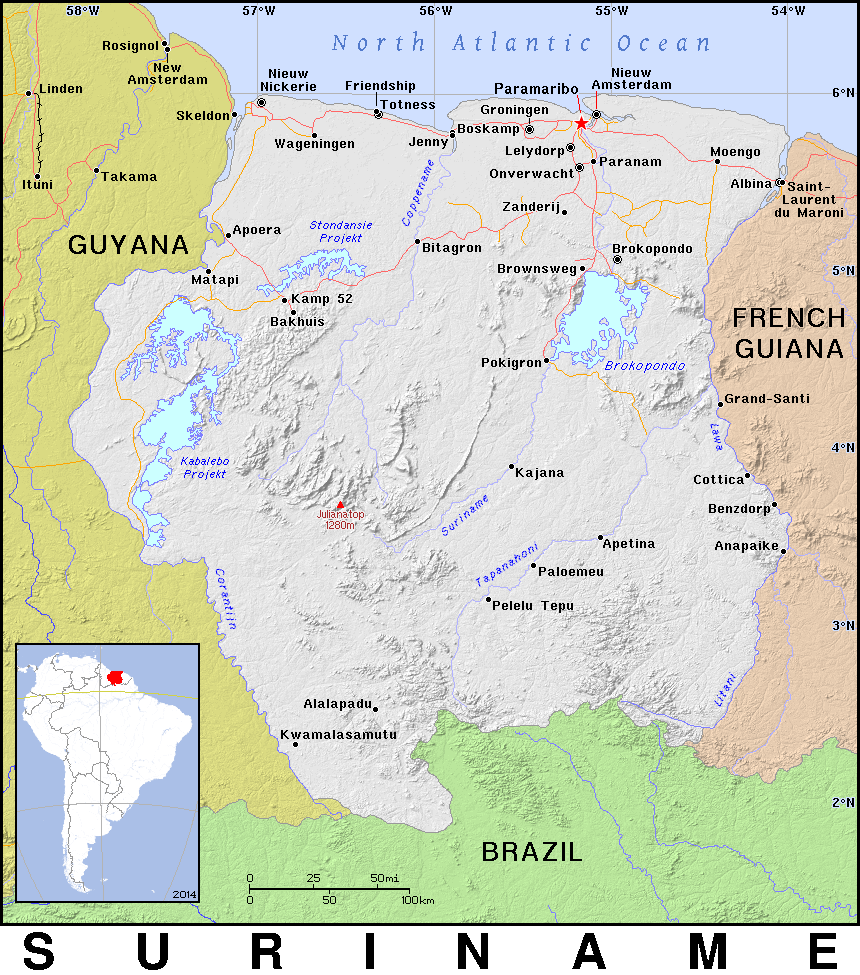
- Type: Boundary delimitation
- Signed: 5 May 1906
- Location: Rio de Janeiro, Brazil
- Effective: 1908
- Parties: Brazil; Netherlands
- Language: French

Full text
- fr:Traité entre les Pays-Bas et les États-Unis du Brésil, établissant la frontière entre le Brésil et la Colonie du Surinam at Wikisource

The Treaty of Limits was a 1906 treaty between Brazil and the Netherlands which established the international boundary between Brazil and the Dutch colony of Suriname. The treaty defined the border as being

formed from the French border French Guiana to the British border British Guiana, the line of the watershed between the Amazon basin to the south, and the basins of the rivers flowing into north to the Atlantic Ocean.

The treaty also established the possibility of designating a joint Brazilian–Dutch commission that would physically demarcate the border with markers if that was deemed necessary. The boundary defined by the treaty is still the recognized border between Brazil and now-independent Suriname. There are no border checkpoints along the border, and much of the border region consists of impenetrable rainforest, but the boundary commission has set down 60 border markers along the Brazil–Suriname border.

The border described in the treaty was the result of a negotiation process between the Netherlands and Brazil and followed the establishment of the borders between Brazil and France (French Guiana, to the east) and Brazil and the United Kingdom (British Guiana, to the west. ) that were based on the same watershed. The latter borders were established after two arbitrations that were headed by Walter Hauser, President of the Swiss Confederation, and King of Italy Victor Emmanuel III, respectively.

The treaty was signed in Rio de Janeiro on 5 May 1906. Brazil and the Netherlands both ratified the treaty in 1908.

== See also ==
- Borders of Suriname
- Borders of Brazil
