= Courantyne River =

River in Suriname and Guyana

Courantyne Corentyne, Corantijn
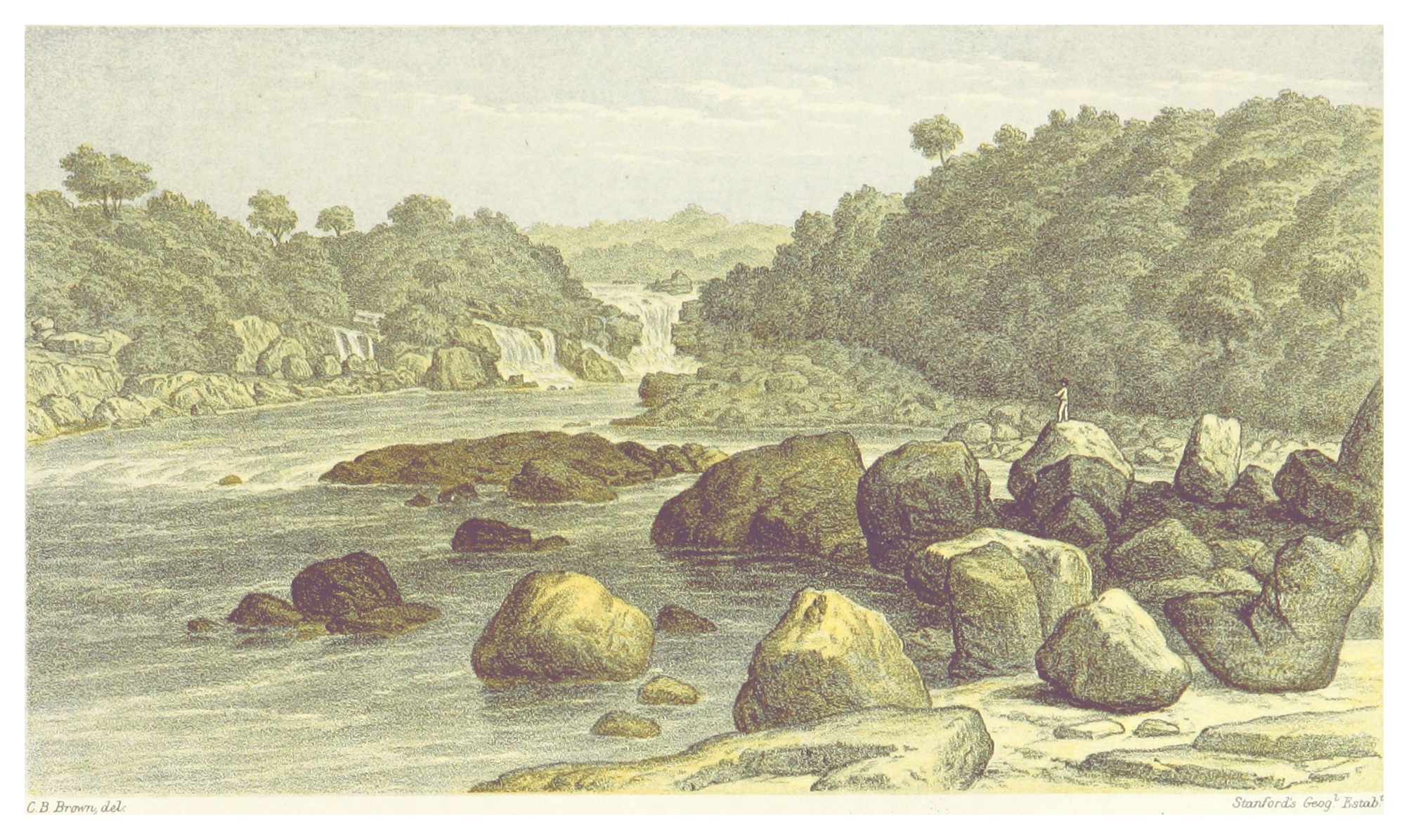
- Wonotobo Middle Fall in the Corentyne Basin from Canoe and Camp Life in British Guiana by Charles Barrington Brown

- Location of mouth

Location
- Country: Suriname, Guyana

Physical characteristics
- Mouth: Atlantic Ocean
  - coordinates: 5°57′N 57°06′W
- Length: 724 km (450 mi)
- Basin size: 69,000 km^{2} (27,000 mi^{2})
- Discharge
  - location: mouth
  - average: 2,300 m^{3}/s (81,000 cu ft/s)

The Courantyne River (/ˈkɜːrəntaɪn/ KUR-ən-tyne), also known as Corentyne and Corantijn (Dutch: [ˌkoːrɑnˈtɛin]), is a river in northern South America in Suriname and Guyana. It is the longest river in Suriname and creates the border between the country and the East Berbice-Corentyne region of Guyana.

Its tributaries include Coeroeni River, Kabalebo River, Kutari River, Lucie River, New River, Sipaliwini River, and Zombie Creek.

== Course ==
The river runs through the Guianan moist forests ecoregion. It originates in the Acarai Mountains and flows northward via the Boven ('Upper') Courantyne which is the source river for approximately 724 km (450 mi) between Guyana and Suriname, emptying into the Atlantic Ocean near Corriverton (Guyana) and Nieuw Nickerie (Suriname). A ferry service operates between these two towns. Small ocean-going vessels are able to navigate the river for about 120 km (75 mi) to Apoera. A bridge is to be built by China Road and Bridge Corporation.

== Waterfalls ==
The Wonotobo Falls, Frederik Willem IV (Anora) Falls, and the King Edward VI Falls are on the Courantyne River. Other falls include the Barrington Brown Falls, the Drios Falls and the Maopityan Falls.

== Territorial dispute ==
Between the upper reaches of the Courantyne, the Upper Courantyne, the Coeroeni and the Koetari rivers lay the controversial Tigri Area claimed by both Suriname and Guyana. The Guyanese–Surinamese border is the Guyanese river bank (the west bank of the river), Suriname regarded the left bank of the Courantyne as a border, but Guyana disputes this and viewed the centre of the river as a frontier, based on the Thalweg Doctrine.

This conflict, which has been fuelled since the colonial era, was solved in 2007 by a verdict by the Hague Arbitration Court, which settles the border between Guyana and Suriname on the left bank of the river, and the river water body belonging to Suriname. The tribunal that defined the maritime boundary between Suriname and Guyana in 2007 confirmed Surinamese sovereignty over the full width of the Entire Courantyne River. Suriname has control over all ship traffic from the mouth of the Courantyne.

== See also ==
- Corantijn Basin
- Borders of Suriname
- List of rivers of Guyana
- List of rivers of Suriname
- List of rivers of the Americas by coastline
