= Conrad Carel Käyser =

Dutch naval officer, explorer and mountaineer (1876 – 1939)

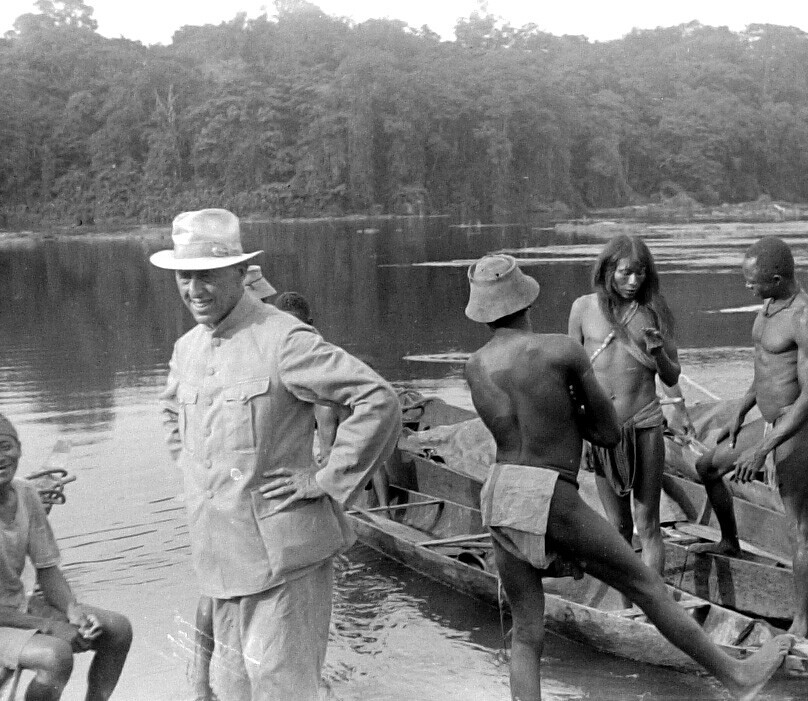
- Käyser meets Wayanas in Suriname, ca. 1936/1937
- Born: November 5, 1876; Oosterhout, Netherlands
- Died: April 26, 1939 (aged 62); The Hague, Netherlands
- Military career
- Allegiance: Netherlands
- Rank: Vice-admiral
- Known for: Exploration expeditions in Suriname
- Memorials: Kayser Mountains

Conrad Carel Käyser (5 November 1876 – 26 April 1939) was a Dutch naval officer, explorer and mountaineer. He led two expeditions in Suriname, among which the expedition at the end of the 1930s to mark the Brazilian–Surinamese border.

== Biography ==
Conrad Carel Käyser was born on 3 November 1876 in Oosterhout, North Brabant.

He pursued a regular study for naval officers and had subsequent promotions in his career by the Royal Netherlands Navy. He was appointed Adjutant First Class on 2 August 1887, Lieutenant at sea Second Class in 1900, Lieutenant at sea First Class on 1 January 1912, Captain Lieutenant at sea on 16 April 1921, Captain at sea on 1 December 1926, and Schout-bij-nacht on 26 January 1929. He finally was promoted to Vice Admiral on 16 March 1931, the day he was honourably discharged from his naval service.

In 1910 he was one of the members of the expedition of Eilerts de Haan to the Upper Suriname River. De Haan passed away on the way and Käyser took over the lead of the expedition. In the Dutch East Indies he also seized every opportunity to engage in mountaineering, which he also pursued in Europe. From 1935 to 1938 he led the expedition to mark the Brazilian–Surinamese border. It took three years and had two intermissions in Paramaribo to wait for a more favourable time of year. After his return and the signing of the border demarcation protocols with England and Brazil he stayed in Paramaribo for some time until his departure to the Netherlands on 24 February 1939.

Shortly after his arrival he had a conversation with minister Charles Welter on 26 April 1939 at the office in the Ministry of the Colonies in The Hague. There, at the age of 62, Käyser suffered a sudden heart attack and medical assistance was promptly summoned in vain. On 29 April 1939, he was laid to rest at the cemetery of Oud Eik en Duinen.

== Awards and honours ==
Käyser was decorated as a Knight in the Order of the Netherlands Lion and Commander in the Order of Orange-Nassau for his role in Suriname. Next to them, he was decorated in several foreign orders. In 1939, he was posthumously awarded the rank of Grand Officer in the Order of the Southern Cross in Brazil. The Käyser Mountains are named after him.
