= Sipaliwini River =

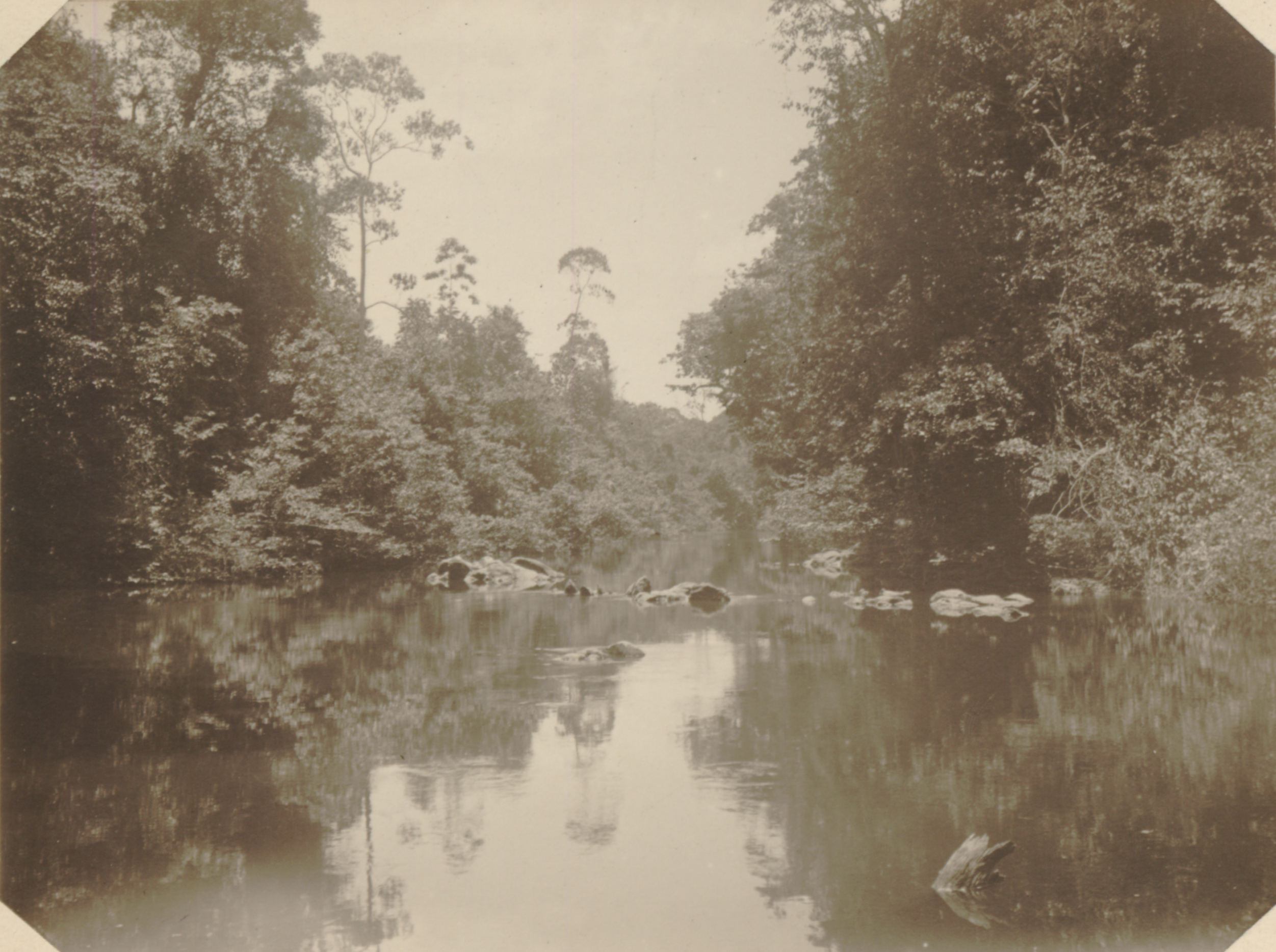
- Sipaliwini River (1907)

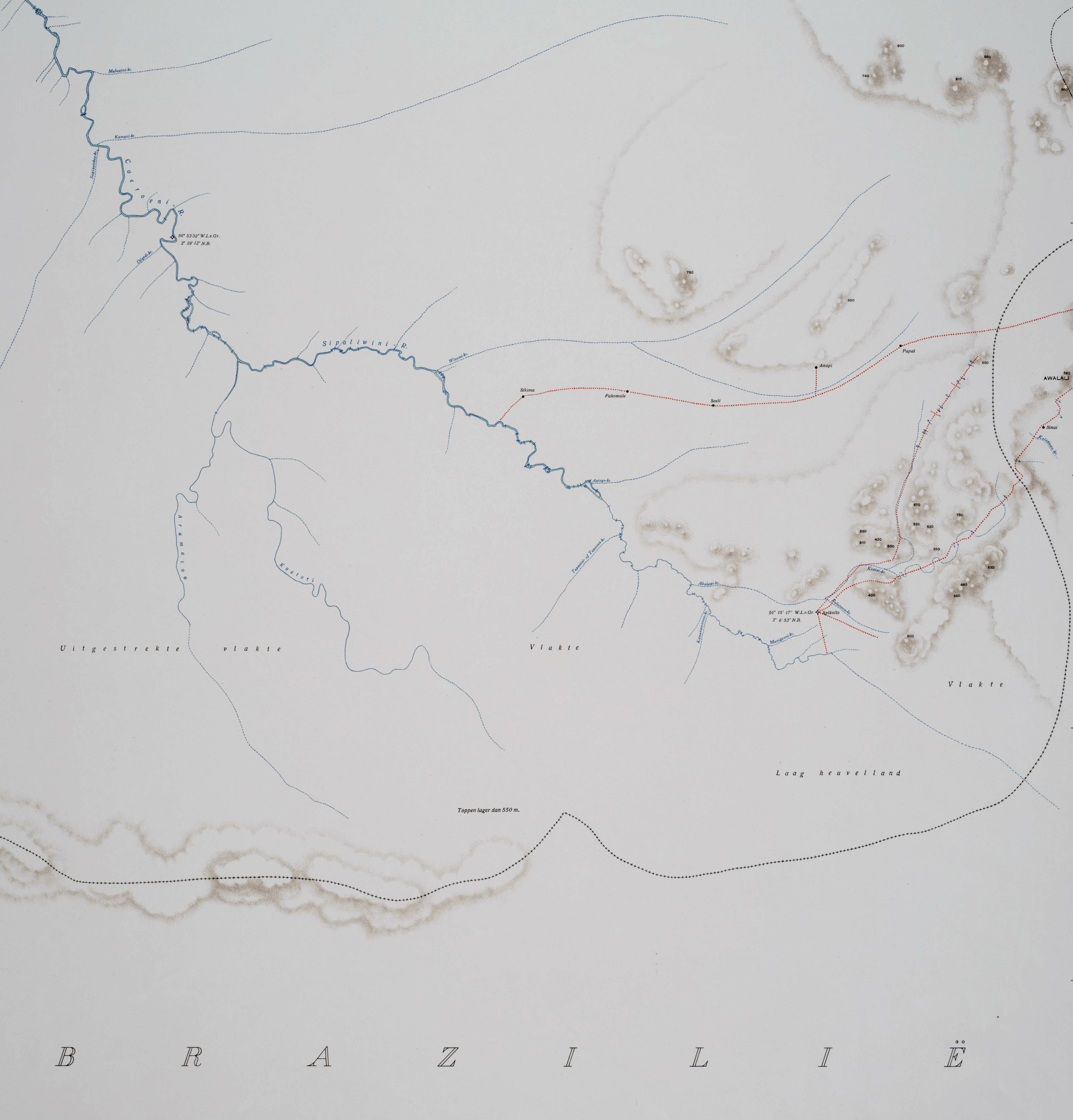
- Map of the Sipaliwini River (1930)

Location
- Country: Suriname

Physical characteristics
- Source: Tumuk Humak Mountains
  - location: 1.8450°N 55.9875°W
- Mouth: Courantyne River
  - location: 2.3439°N 56.8718°W

Basin features
- Progression: Courantyne River→Atlantic Ocean

Sipaliwini River is a river of Suriname, the main source of the Courantyne River. It gives its name to the village of Sipaliwini Savanna and to the Sipaliwini District. It flows through the village of Kwamalasamutu. The name translates to thornback ray (sipari) river in the local Maroon dialect.

== See also ==
- List of rivers of Suriname
