= Acarai Mountains =

Mountain range in Guyana

- Akarai Mountains
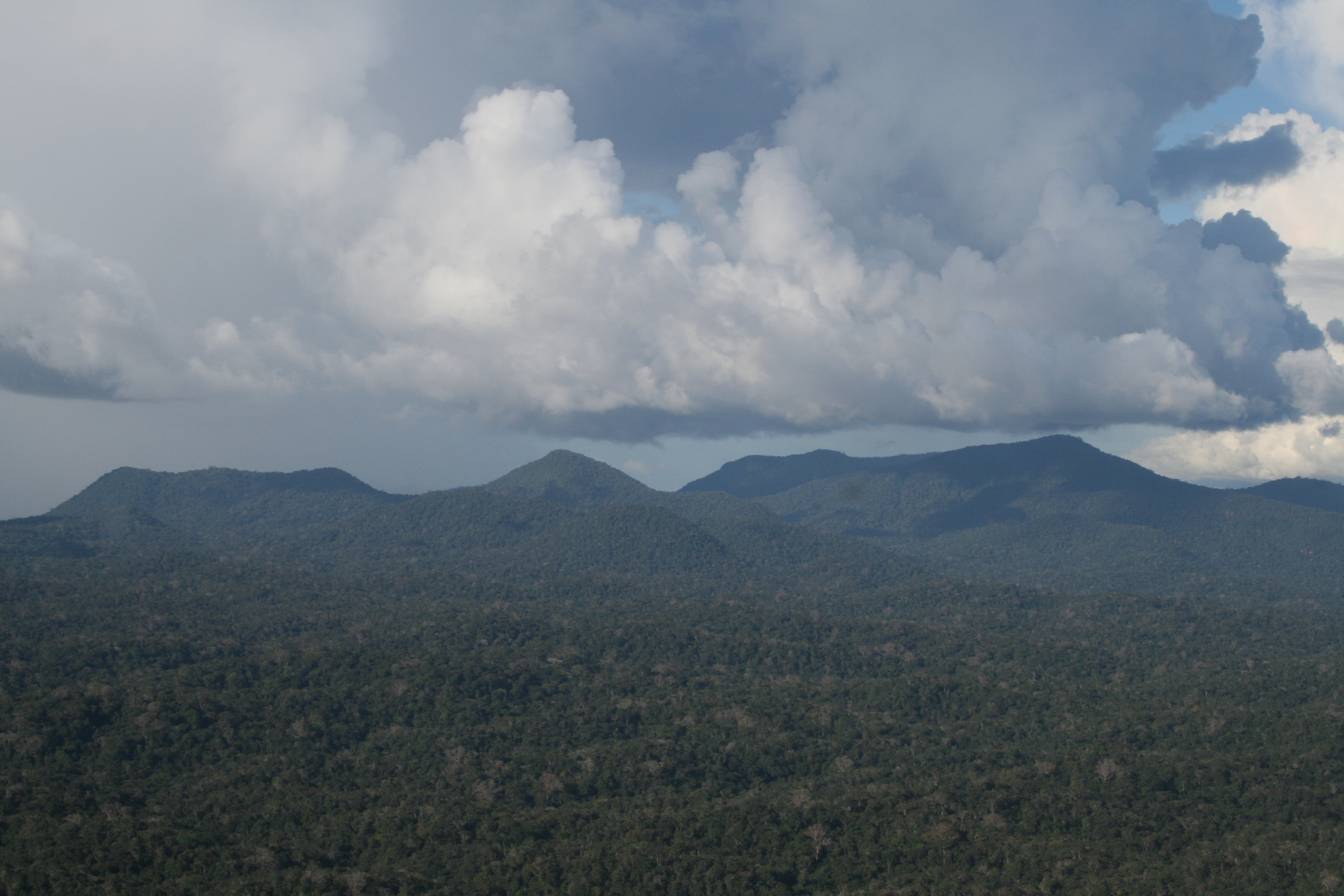

Highest point
- Peak: unnamed point
- Elevation: 1,009 m (3,310 ft)
- Coordinates: 1°22′N 59°11′W

Naming
- Native name: Serra do Acaraí (Portuguese)

Geography
- Location within Guyana
- Country: Guyana
- Range coordinates: 1°50′N 57°30′W
- Borders on: Tumuk Humak Mountains

The Acarai Mountains (also, Akarai Mountains) (Portuguese: Serra do Acaraí; French: Montes Acaraí) are a wet, forested highland region of low mountains located in the southern part of Guyana. This range lies along the common border between Guyana and Brazil. The Acarai Mountains is one of four mountain ranges in Guyana, the others being the Imataka, Kanuku and Pakaraima mountains. The headwaters of the Essequibo River, the longest river in Guyana, and the Courantyne River, have their sources in this range. The actual source of the Essequibo was discovered in 2013 by a Guyanese-German team. The mountain range was first mentioned in 1821 by A.H. Brué as Sierra do Acaray.

This range is home to a single village of Wai-Wais, the descendants of surviving tribes that were once believed extinct. The village was first mentioned around 1837.

The unnamed high point of this range is located at 1°22′N 59°11′W, and has an altitude of 1,009 metres (3,310 ft). This range extends to the east, where it becomes the Tumuk Humak Mountains along the border of Suriname and French Guiana with Brazil.
