= New River (South America) =

New River Kutari River
- Location within Guyana

Location
- Countries: Guyana and Suriname

Physical characteristics
- Mouth
  - location: Corentyne River
  - coordinates: 3°23′0″N 57°36′0″W

The New River (Dutch: Nieuwe Rivier) is a river of South America located in the southeastern region of Guyana. It forms the Western border of the Tigri Area or New River Triangle, a disputed territory that is claimed by both Guyana and Suriname. In 1965, to bolster this territorial claim, the Surinamese government issued a decree to begin referring to the river as the Upper Corantyne River in Suriname.

The river rises in the Acarai Mountains and flows, together with the Coeroeni River, to the Courantyne River. The Oronoque River is a major tributary of the New River and within the Tigri Area. It was the location of a skirmish between Guyana Police Force and a Surinamese labor camp, 15 December 1967.

Military conflict broke out in August 1969 when members of the Guyana Defence Force launched an operation to clear Suriname military personnel from the area. The operation was named "Operation Climax".

Due to the intervention by the GDF, the Surinamese military withdrew without any casualties and all detainees were released. This operation was one of the most successful ventures of the force.

Even though the area is disputed, it still attracts illegal mining. In 1993, the Guyana Defense Force identified alluvial mining by Brazilian nationals.

== See also ==
- List of rivers of Suriname
- List of rivers of Guyana
- Borders of Suriname
