= Rudi Kappel =

Surinamese aviator and business owner

- Rudi Kappel in front of his Aero Commander 520
- Born: Ronald Elwin Kappel; 8 November 1926; Port of Spain, Trinidad and Tobago
- Died: 6 October 1959 (aged 32); Paloemeu, Surinam
- Other name: Sonny Kappel
- Occupations: Pilot, business owner
- Known for: Co-founder of Surinam Airways, Zorg en Hoop Airport and Rudi Kappel Airstrip

Ronald "Rudi" Elwin Kappel (8 November 1926 – 6 October 1959) was a Surinamese pilot. He was one of the founders of Luchtvaartbedrijf Kappel-Van Eyck which is now called Surinam Airways, the first airline in Suriname. He also helped construct the Zorg en Hoop Airport, and the Rudi Kappel Airstrip. Kappel died in an air crash near Paloemeu.

== Biography ==
Kappel was born on 8 November 1926 in Port of Spain, Trinidad. Both his parents were from Suriname. He went to the United States and obtained his pilot licence in 1948.

In 1950, Kappel met Leendert Jägers, director of Ypenburg Airport near the Hague, with whom he had wanted to establish the first Surinamese airline company. They had planned to begin operations in February 1951. A second-hand Cessna AT-17 Bobcat was purchased. On 5 February, one engine failed near Aruba, and then the other stopped as well. Kappel was forced to make an emergency landing at Bubali. Both Kappel and Maurice Young, his passenger, escaped with minor injuries. However, the plane was lost, and not insured.

In 1952, Kappel and Herman van Eyck, owner of the 7 Up factory in Suriname, founded Luchtvaartbedrijf Kappel-Van Eyck, and received permission to start a cargo airline in Suriname. They were not allowed to transport passengers, because the government wanted to start a national airline. Kappel and van Eyck possessed only one airplane based in Zanderij Airport. In order to expand operations, van Eyck sold his factory, and the Zorg en Hoop Airport in Paramaribo was constructed.

On 1 October 1952, Luchtvaartbedrijf Kappel-Van Eyck received permission to transport passengers. On 13 October, Kappel flew to Camaguey Air Base, Cuba, and wanted to fly on to Santiago de Cuba using a letter of recommendation of the mayor of Paramaribo. Upon landing in Santiago, he was arrested. After contacting the Dutch embassy, he was released; however, he was arrested again when he tried to leave Santiago. With the aid of the embassy, he was released for a second time. The negotiations with the Surinamese government to establish a national airline were difficult. In 1954, Kappel closed the company and started flying in British Guiana.

On 1 January 1955, the Surinaamse Luchtvaart Maatschappij (SLM) was founded as the national airline. Kappel and van Eyck were reimbursed for their investments, and Kappel became chief pilot for the SLM.

== Grasshopper ==
The Operation Grasshopper airstrips with Zorg en Hoop

The Geijskes expedition to the Tafelberg began on 3 March 1958. The goal of the expedition was to examine the flora and fauna of the savanna around the mountain, and whether an airstrip could be built there. Kappel was assigned the latter task. On 16 March, Kappel, H. Massink, and 18 Amerindians started clearing the savanna, and on 24 March, the first plane landed on the airstrip. Geijskes decided to name the savanna "Kappel Savanna".

In February 1959, Operation Grasshopper was announced which intended to map the natural resources in the interior of Suriname. As part of the operation, six more airstrips were to be constructed.

== Death ==
Wicenty "Vincent" Fajks was born in Chełm, Poland on 22 May 1914. He was a World War II veteran who had served in the No. 317 Polish Fighter Squadron of the Polish Air Force in Great Britain. In 1957, he started flying in Suriname.

On 6 October 1959, Fajks and Kappel set off from Tafelberg to Paloemeu in an Aero Commander 520 with registration "PZ-TAG" to deliver cargo for Operation Grasshopper. In the fog, one of the engines failed, causing the aircraft to crash into a hill several kilometres from Paloemeu Airstrip. Both pilots were killed.

On 11 October, Kappel and Fajks received a state funeral with speeches by Prime Minister Severinus Desiré Emanuels of Suriname and Prime Minister Efraïn Jonckheer of the Netherlands Antilles.

== Legacy ==
On 10 October 1959, Prime Minister Emanuels announced that the airstrip at Paloemeu would be named "Vincent Fayks Airstrip," and the airstrip on the Kappel Savanna near Tafelberg, "Rudi Kappel Airstrip." Also the mountain discovered by Fajks would be named Bonita after his daughter.

On 11 August 2004, the first Boeing 747 of Surinam Airways was named "Ronald Elwin Kappel". On 11 February 2017, a bust of Kappel which was sculpted by Erwin de Vries was placed near the terminal of Johan Adolf Pengel International Airport.
