= Kronenburg =

Kronenburg or Kronenbourg may refer to:

== Places ==
- Kronenburg, a town subsumed into Dahlem, North Rhine-Westphalia, Germany
- Kronenburg, Suriname, a village in Suriname
- Loenen-Kronenburg, a former Dutch municipality

== Other uses ==
- Kronenbourg 1664, French or German beer produced by Kronenbourg Brewery
- Kronenburg B.V., fire-service vehicles manufacturer, based in Wanroij, Netherlands
- Kronenburg tram stop, in Amstelveen, Netherlands

== See also ==
- Cronenberg (disambiguation)
- Kronenberg (disambiguation)
