= Lauromacromia dubitalis =

Conservation status
- Least Concern (IUCN 3.1)

Scientific classification
- Kingdom: Animalia
- Phylum: Arthropoda
- Clade: Pancrustacea
- Class: Insecta
- Order: Odonata
- Infraorder: Anisoptera
- Superfamily: Libelluloidea
- Family: Lauromacromiidae
- Genus: Lauromacromia
- Species: L. dubitalis

Binomial name
- Lauromacromia dubitalis (Fraser, 1939)

Synonyms
- Gomphomacromia dubitalis Fraser, 1939

Species of dragonfly

Lauromacromia dubitalis is a species of dragonfly in the family Lauromacromiidae. It is found in northern South America, where it inhabits shaded forest streams and rivers in the Amazon rainforest.

The species was described by F. C. Fraser in 1939 as Gomphomacromia dubitalis. He noted that although its wing venation resembled species of Gomphomacromia, its overall appearance and male appendages were more similar to those of Macromia, making its placement uncertain. In 1970, Geijskes established the genus Lauromacromia for the species, recognising it as sufficiently distinct from Gomphomacromia.

== Description ==
Lauromacromia dubitalis is a medium-sized dragonfly with a slender, dark brown to black body marked with yellow. The thorax bears pale yellow longitudinal stripes, while the abdomen is long and cylindrical with yellow markings that become more restricted towards the tip.

The wings are transparent with dark venation, and the eyes are large and contiguous. Males can be distinguished by their appendages, which Fraser considered unlike those of Gomphomacromia and more closely resembling those of Macromia, a feature that later contributed to the establishment of the genus Lauromacromia.

== Distribution and habitat ==
Lauromacromia dubitalis is known from French Guiana, Venezuela and northern Brazil.

The species inhabits shaded forest streams and rivers within the Amazon rainforest. Larvae have been collected from the margins of the Grand Inini River in French Guiana, where they occupied shallow water among submerged roots, leaf litter and other organic debris exposed during periods of low water. Adults are rarely encountered, suggesting that they spend much of their lives in densely forested habitats that are difficult to sample.

== Larva ==
The larva of Lauromacromia dubitalis was described by Fleck (2002) from specimens collected in French Guiana. It is a robust, broad-bodied larva with a distinctive prehensile labium and other features characteristic of stream-dwelling dragonflies.

Günther Fleck noted that the larva shared a number of characters with Neocordulia, while also possessing features unique to Lauromacromia. He concluded that these characteristics supported the distinctiveness of the genus and provided additional evidence that it was not closely related to Gomphomacromia despite similarities in the adults.

== Taxonomic history ==
Fraser described the species in 1939 as Gomphomacromia dubitalis from a specimen collected in French Guiana. He noted that although the wing venation was typical of Gomphomacromia, the general appearance and the male appendages more closely resembled those of Macromia, making its generic placement uncertain.

In 1970, Geijskes established the genus Lauromacromia for the species, concluding that its combination of characters distinguished it from Gomphomacromia while also showing affinities with Neocordulia and Macromia.

== Etymology ==
The species name dubitalis is derived from the Latin dubitare ("to doubt"), meaning "to be doubted". Kenneth Morton proposed the name because the species' generic placement was uncertain, and Fraser adopted the suggestion in the original description.
