= Ephrata =

Ephrata may refer to:

== Places ==
- Ephrata, Suriname
- Ephrata, Pennsylvania, U.S.
- Ephrata, Washington, U.S.
- Ephrata Township, Pennsylvania, U.S.

== Other uses ==
- Ephrata Cloister, a religious community in Ephrata, Pennsylvania
- Ephrata Erratic Fan, a geologic feature of the Lower Coulee within the Grand Coulee in the U.S. state of Washington

== See also ==
- Efrata or Efrat, an Israeli settlement near Bethlehem in the West Bank
- Ephratah, New York
- Ephrath, a traditional name of Bethlehem, and a wife of the biblical Caleb, son of Hezron
