= Rudi Kappel Airstrip =

Airport in Tafelberg, Suriname

Rudi Kappel Airstrip Tafelberg Airstrip
- IATA: none; ICAO: SMTB

Summary
- Airport type: Public
- Operator: Luchtvaartdienst Suriname
- Location: Tafelberg, Suriname
- Elevation AMSL: 1,112 ft / 339 m
- Coordinates: 3°47′15″N 56°09′00″W

Map
- Location in Suriname

Runways
Direction	Length		Surface
Direction	m	ft	Surface
11/29	1,200	3,937	Grass
- Sources: GCM Google Maps HERE/Nokia Maps

Rudi Kappel Airstrip (ICAO: SMTB) is located 9 kilometres (5.6 mi) south of the Tafelberg tepui in Suriname. It was constructed as part of Operation Grasshopper. It used to be named Tafelberg Airstrip, but was renamed Rudi Kappel Airstrip, after the co-pilot of a flight that crashed near Vincent Fayks Airport on 6 October 1959.

== History ==
The airstrip was the first airstrip to be constructed in the interior of Suriname. On 3 March 1958, the Geijskes expedition to the Tafelberg began. One of the goals of the expedition was to examine whether an airstrip could be built on the savanna. On 16 March, Rudi Kappel, H. Massink, and 18 Amerindians started clearing the area, and on 24 March, the first plane landed on the airstrip. In February 1959, Operation Grasshopper was announced which intended to map the natural resources in the interior of Suriname. As part of the operation, six more airstrips were to be constructed.

== Charters and destinations ==
Charter airlines serving this airport are:

Airlines	Destinations
Blue Wing Airlines	Charter: Paramaribo–Zorg en Hoop
Gum Air	Charter: Paramaribo–Zorg en Hoop
Hi-Jet Helicopter Services	Charter: Paramaribo–Zorg en Hoop

== Accidents and incidents ==
- (Suriname (Kingdom of the Netherlands)) On 25 October 1968 a Douglas C-47A PH-DAA of KLM Aerocarto flew into Tafelberg following an engine failure whilst on a survey flight. The aircraft collided with the mountain in cloud, killing three of the five people on board.

== See also ==
- List of airports in Suriname
- Transport in Suriname
