= Lauromacromia =

Scientific classification
- Kingdom: Animalia
- Phylum: Arthropoda
- Clade: Pancrustacea
- Class: Insecta
- Order: Odonata
- Infraorder: Anisoptera
- Superfamily: Libelluloidea
- Family: Lauromacromiidae; Goodman, Abbott, Bybee, Ehlert, Frandsen, Guralnick, Kalkman, Newton, Pinto & Ware, 2025
- Genus: Lauromacromia; Geijskes, 1970

Species
- Lauromacromia bedei; Lauromacromia dubitalis; Lauromacromia flaviae; Lauromacromia luismoojeni; Lauromacromia melanica; Lauromacromia picinguaba
- Distribution of Lauromacromia

Genus of dragonflies

Lauromacromia is a genus of dragonflies and the only genus in the family Lauromacromiidae. The six recognised species are endemic to South America, where they inhabit forested streams and rivers in tropical and subtropical regions. They are rarely encountered and remain among the least-known dragonflies of the Neotropics.

The genus was formerly placed in the family Corduliidae, but molecular phylogenetic studies have shown it to represent a distinct evolutionary lineage within the superfamily Libelluloidea.

== Description ==
Lauromacromia are medium-sized dragonflies with slender black or dark brown bodies marked with yellow. The thorax usually bears pale longitudinal stripes, while the abdomen is long and cylindrical with yellow markings that vary between species.

The wings are transparent, with a narrow amber tint at the base in some species. The eyes are large and contiguous, and the legs are relatively long. The male anal appendages and the female ovipositor provide important characters for distinguishing species within the genus.

== Distribution and habitat ==
Lauromacromia is endemic to South America. Species occur in the Amazon, Atlantic Forest and Cerrado biogeographic regions of Brazil, as well as French Guiana and Venezuela.

Adults inhabit forest streams and rivers, where they are rarely collected. The scarcity of specimens in museum collections suggests that they are either naturally uncommon or spend much of their lives in habitats that are difficult to sample, such as densely forested waterways.

== Taxonomic history ==
Geijskes established the genus Lauromacromia in 1970 for Gomphomacromia dubitalis, concluding that its combination of characters did not fit any recognised genus. Although the wing venation resembled Gomphomacromia, the male anal appendages were more similar to those of Macromia, while the ventral process on the eighth abdominal segment indicated a relationship with Neocordulia. This combination of features led Geijskes to establish a new genus for the species.

Additional species described from Brazil were subsequently assigned to Lauromacromia, expanding the genus to six recognised species distributed across the Amazon, Atlantic Forest and Cerrado.

For much of its history, Lauromacromia was placed within the family Corduliidae, although its relationships remained uncertain. Molecular phylogenetic studies demonstrated that it represents a distinct lineage within the superfamily Libelluloidea, and it is now placed in the monotypic family Lauromacromiidae. Coincidentally, the family-group name Lauromacromiidae was proposed independently in Insectes du Monde and by Goodman et al. (2025).

== Classification ==
The following genus and species are currently placed in the family Lauromacromiidae:

- Lauromacromia Geijskes, 1970
  - Lauromacromia bedei Machado, 2005
  - Lauromacromia dubitalis (Fraser, 1939)
  - Lauromacromia flaviae Machado, 2002
  - Lauromacromia luismoojeni (Santos, 1967)
  - Lauromacromia melanica Pinto & Carvalho, 2010
  - Lauromacromia picinguaba Carvalho, Salgado & Werneck-de-Carvalho, 2004

== Etymology ==
The family name Lauromacromiidae is derived from the type genus Lauromacromia, with the zoological suffix -idae denoting a family.

Geijskes did not explain the origin of the generic name, Lauromacromia. It appears to combine Macromia, reflecting the similarities noted by Geijskes, with the prefix Lauro-, whose intended meaning was not stated in the original description.
