= List of museums in Suriname =

This is a list of museums in Suriname. Suriname is a small country on the north-eastern coast of South America, and a former Dutch colony.

== Paramaribo ==
- Koto Museum - History and culture museum dedicated to Afro-Surinamese culture (notably traditional costumes). Prinsessestraat 43, Paramaribo.
- Lalla Rookh Museum - History and culture museum dedicated to Indo-Surinamese culture. Lalla Rookhweg 54, Paramaribo. (Lalla Rookh was the name of the first ship to transport Indian indentured workers from British India to the Dutch colony of Suriname, and about two-thirds of them stayed on after their 5-year contracts had ended.)
- Maritime Museum - Located in the building of the Maritime Authority of Suriname (MAS), Cornelis Jongbawstraat 2, Paramaribo.
- Numismatic Museum of the Central Bank, dedicated to the history of Surinamese currency, located in the building of the Central Bank of Suriname, Mr. F.H.R. Lim A Po straat 7, Paramaribo.
- Surinamese Museum (Surinaams Museum)- General history and culture museum of Suriname, located in Fort Zeelandia, Abraham Crijnssenweg 1, Paramaribo.
- Surinamese Rum House - Small museum dedicated to the history of rum production, Cornelis Jongbawstraat 18, Paramaribo.
- Villa Zapakara - Surinamese history and culture museum for children, Prins Hendrikstraat nr 17b, Paramaribo.
- Kerkelijk Museum (Church Museum) of the Roman Catholic Diocese of Paramaribo
- Boomhutmuseum (Tree hut Museum) at Clevia Park
- Jewish Museum at the Neveh Shalom Synagogue

== Brokopondo ==
- Berg en Dal with a museum en info center on the plantation

== Commewijne ==
- Fort Nieuw-Amsterdam - Historical open-air museum located in Commewijne.
- Museum Bakkie - History and culture museum on plantation Bakkie (Reijnsdorp), Bakkie, Commewijne District.
- Frederiksdorp, restored plantation with the Story Museum and Boni Trail
- Telecommunication museum, Nieuw Amsterdam, Commewijne.

== Coronie ==
- Mangrove Education Center - Education Center dedicated to mangroves, located in the former fire station in Totness, Coronie.

== Marowijne ==
- Contemporary Art Museum Moengo/Marowijne Art Park - Located in Moengo, Marowijne.
- Marowijne Art Park, international art park near Moengo

== Sipaliwini ==
- Saamaka Marron Museum - History and culture museum dedicated to Saramacca tribe within Maroon culture, located in the village Pikin Slee at the Upper Suriname River
- Diitabiki Museum Fositen Gudu, local museum for the Aucane tribe of the Maroon culture, located Diitabiki at the Tapanahony River

== See also ==
- List of museums by country
- Suriname Museum in Amsterdam
