= Augusta Curiel =

Surinamese photographer

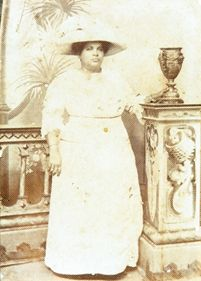
- Born: Augusta Cornelia Paulina Curiel; 13 December 1873; Paramaribo
- Died: 22 November 1937 (aged 63); Paramaribo

Augusta Cornelia Paulina Curiel (1873–1937) was a Surinamese photographer. She and her sister created an important record of life in the early twentieth century.

== Life ==
Augusta was born in Paramaribo in 1873. She took her mother's surname as her father abandoned them.

Together with her sister Anna they were known as the ladies Curiel or the Curiel sisters. Augusta took pictures and Anna acted as her assistant. In 1929 Queen Wilhelmina granted her the title of hofleverancier. She was the first photographer of Suriname for the royal house. The sisters Curiel were the owner of one of the most famous photo studios in Suriname: Augusta Curiel.

For almost forty years the sisters Curiel sisters took pictures of everyday life in Suriname. The photographs show that Augusta Curiel was a compositional and a technically gifted photographer. She always worked with available light and no photometer. Despite these limitations, they proved able to create beautiful images in dim government buildings, churches and factories. Curiel's oeuvre is made up of mostly daily life topics, which were of value to historians and other interested parties. They photographed both in their studio and on plantations and in the interior. The botanist Gerold Stahel took the women on some of his expeditions. Many of the surviving images are group portraits, made by and for (mission) schools, boarding schools and orphanages.

They used a heavy wood and plate camera. After the shooting, the negatives were developed and printed by illuminating off the glass from below. A few times a week, a batch of ice was delivered to the dark room, the required chemical baths to keep the proper temperature. Probably Anna and Augusta reused a lot of the expensive glass negatives. Fortunately, many cityscapes, landscapes, shots of factories, schools and orphanages have survived. Anna tried to continue the photo studio after the death of Augusta, but she sold the shop in the 1950s.

The glass plates were expensive and may have been reused several times to take different pictures. In 2005 Janneke van Dijk, curator of the Tropenmuseum in Amsterdam, found out that about 400 original glass plate negatives were stored in the depot of the Surinaams Museum in Fort Zeelandia. Despite the time and the climate the pictures were in good condition. They were digitised and published in 2007 as "Augusta Curiel, Photographer in Suriname from 1904 to 1937".

In 2021, two photographs by Curiel (Portrait of an Afro-Surinamese nanny with two European children and Worker's dwellings and pharmacy on the Geijersvlijt Plantation) were included in the Netherlands Photo Museum's permanent exhibition Gallery of Honour of Dutch Photography, consisting of 99 photographs.

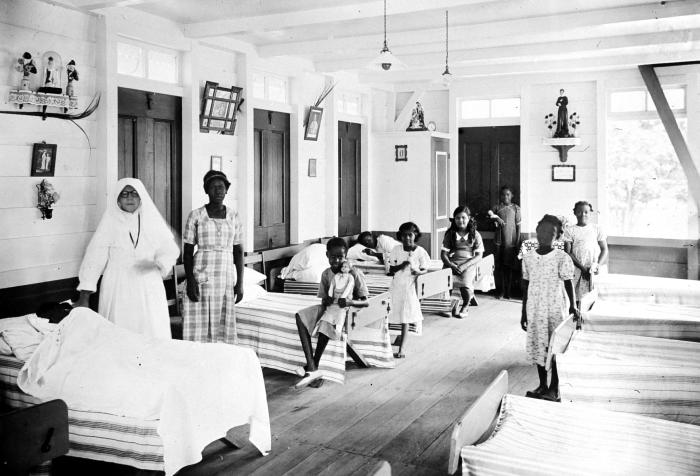
Girls' sleeping quarters of the melaatsen stichting Sint Gerardus Majella

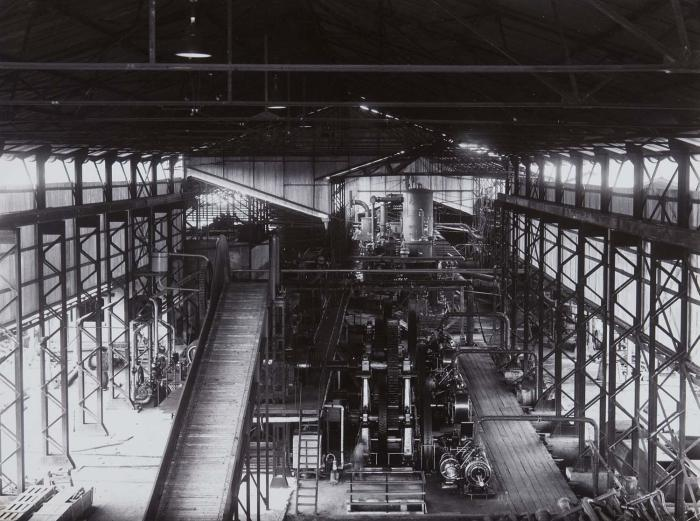
Sugar factory at plantation Mariënburg

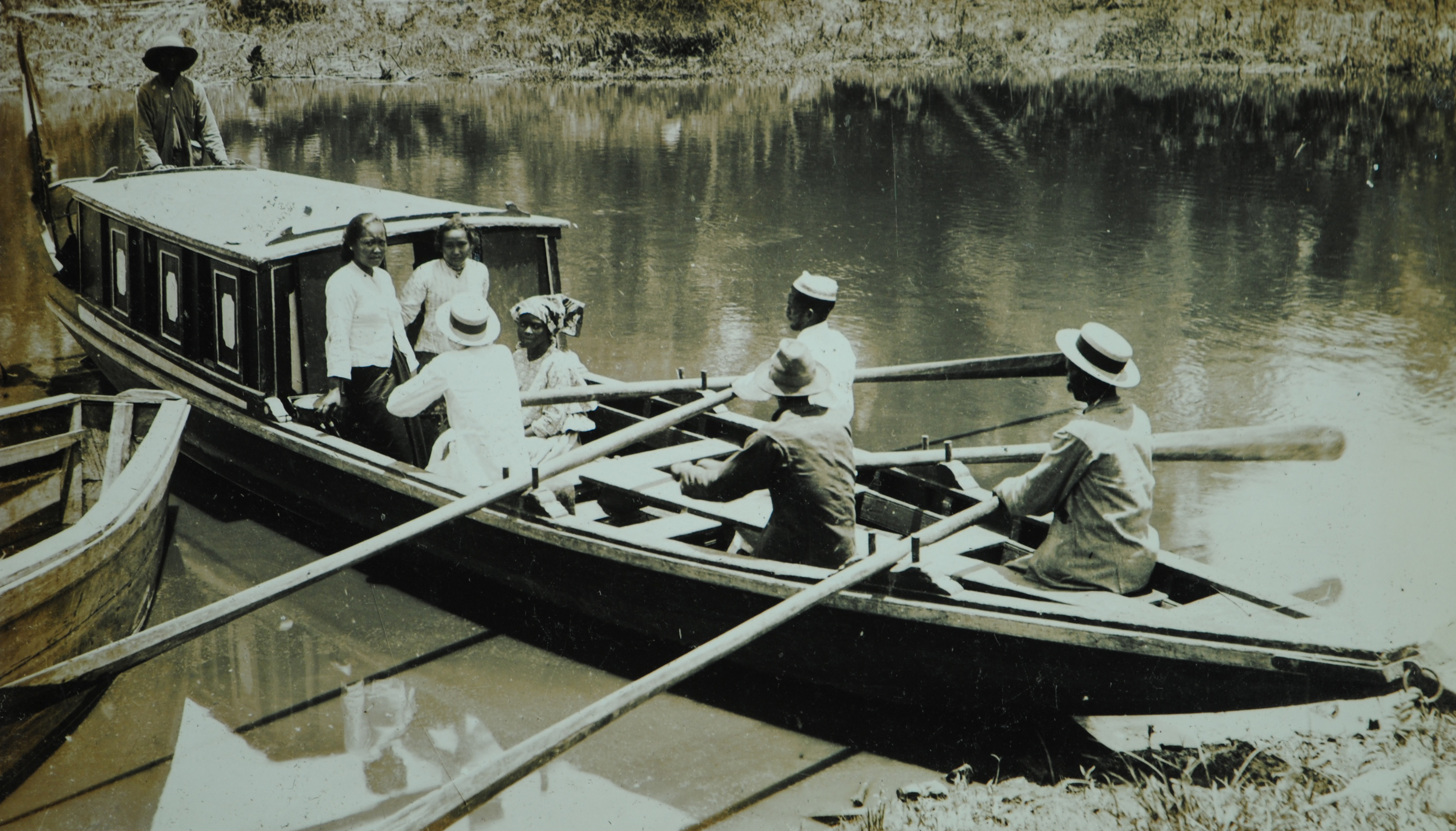
Cabinboat with rowers

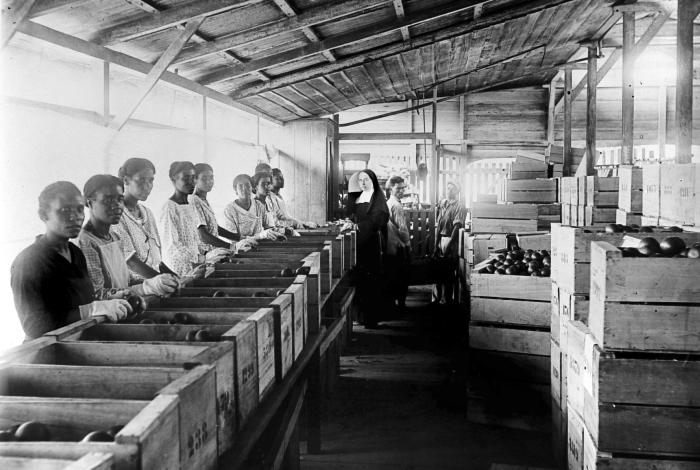
Sorting oranges in the Cultuurtuin

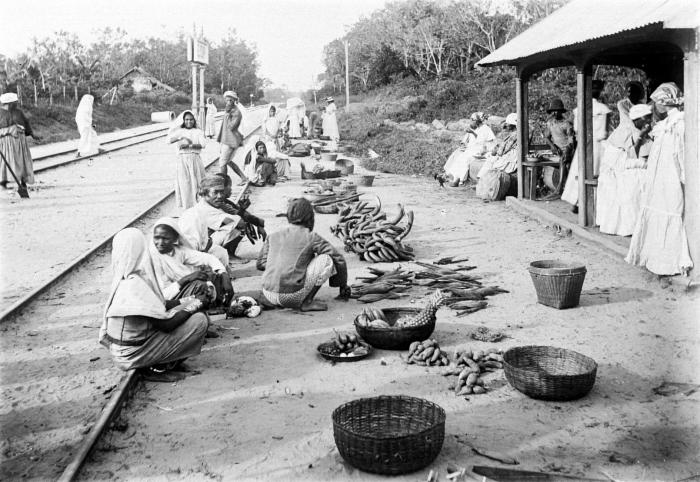
Market in Lelydorp at railway stop Landsspoorweg

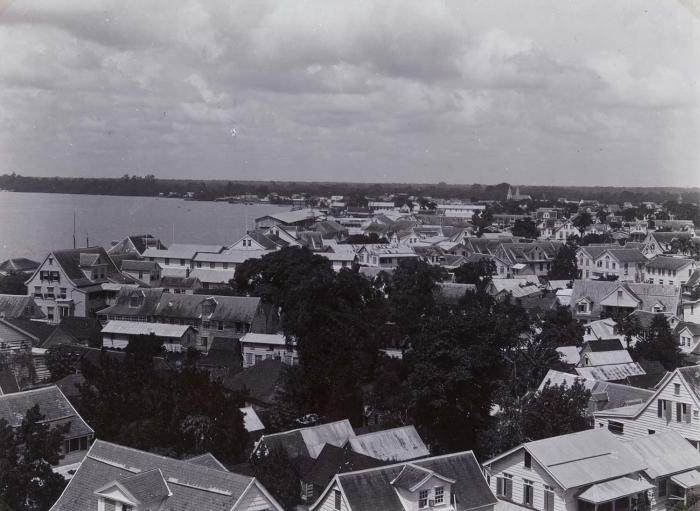
View of Paramaribo

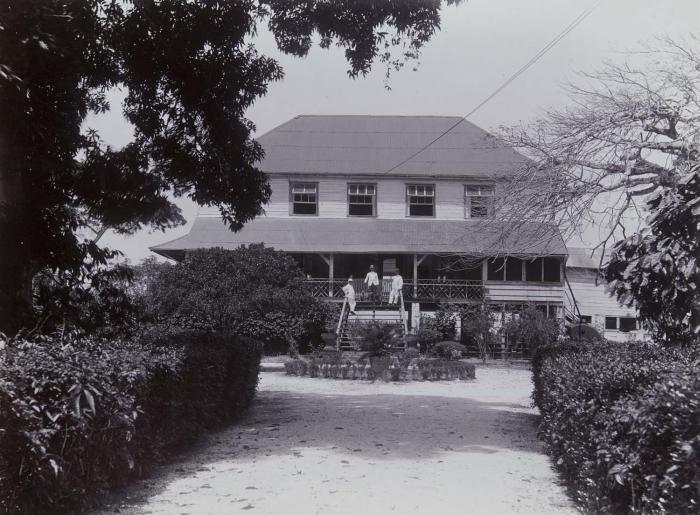
Plantation Alliance

== Augusta Curiel in museum collections ==
- Photoarchive of the Stichting Surinaams Museum
- Rijksmuseum Amsterdam
- Tropeninstituut Amsterdam
- Nederlands Fotomuseum
