= Surinaams Museum =

Museum in Paramaribo, Suriname

- Established: 1952
- Location: Fort Zeelandia, Paramaribo, Suriname
- Coordinates: 5.8252°N 55.149872°W

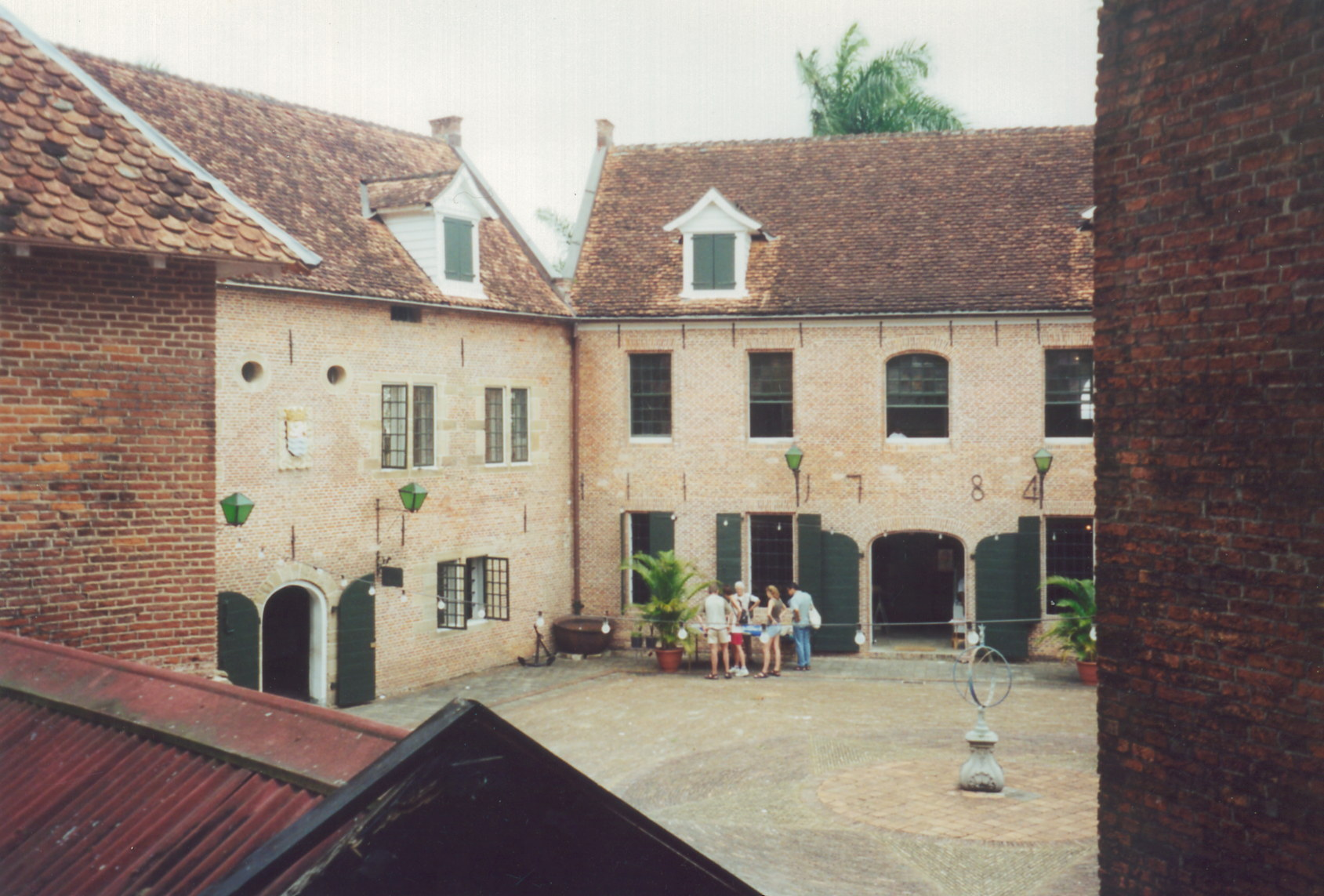
Fort Zeelandia in Paramaribo

The Surinaams Museum is a museum located at Abraham Crijnssenweg 1 in Fort Zeelandia, Paramaribo, Suriname.

== Description ==
The Surinaams Museum is located inside Fort Zeelandia, the site where British and Dutch colonists first arrived in Suriname. In 1947, Stichting Surinaams Museum was founded in order to preserve the cultural heritage of Suriname. In 1952, the first museum opened in the Bettencourt building. In 1954, Dirk Geijskes became its first director. In 1972, the museum moved to its current location in Fort Zeelandia.

The permanent exhibit spaces include reconstructions of "an old apothecary shop, a cobbler shop and a prison cell in its original state." The museum displays a range of ethnographic and historical objects, including photographs, art, furniture, and textiles from the European, Hindustani, Maroon, Chinese, Javanese, and indigenous Amerindian people who once inhabited the fort and surrounding areas. The collection includes 51 botanical drawings by the Surinamese artist Gerrit Schouten and about 400 glass negatives of the work of the Surinamese photographer Augusta Curiel.

== See also ==
- List of museums in Suriname
- The Magic Lantern of Mr. Furet, a narrative of plantation life in 1840s Suriname with contemporaneous illustrations.
