= Cronenberg =

Cronenberg may refer to:

== People ==
- Cronenberg (surname), people with the surname
  - David Cronenberg (born 1943), Canadian filmmaker, screenwriter and actor
  - Brandon Cronenberg (born 1980), Canadian director and screenwriter
  - Caitlin Cronenberg (born 1984), Canadian Photographer and filmmaker
  - Denise Cronenberg (born 1938), Canadian costume designer.

== Places ==
- Cronenberg, Rhineland-Palatinate, a municipality in Rhineland-Palatinate, Germany
- Cronenberg, Wuppertal, a former town, since 1929 part of Wuppertal, Germany

== See also ==
- Kronenberg (disambiguation)
- Kronenburg (disambiguation)
