= Paloemeu River =

Paloemeu River Palumeu River
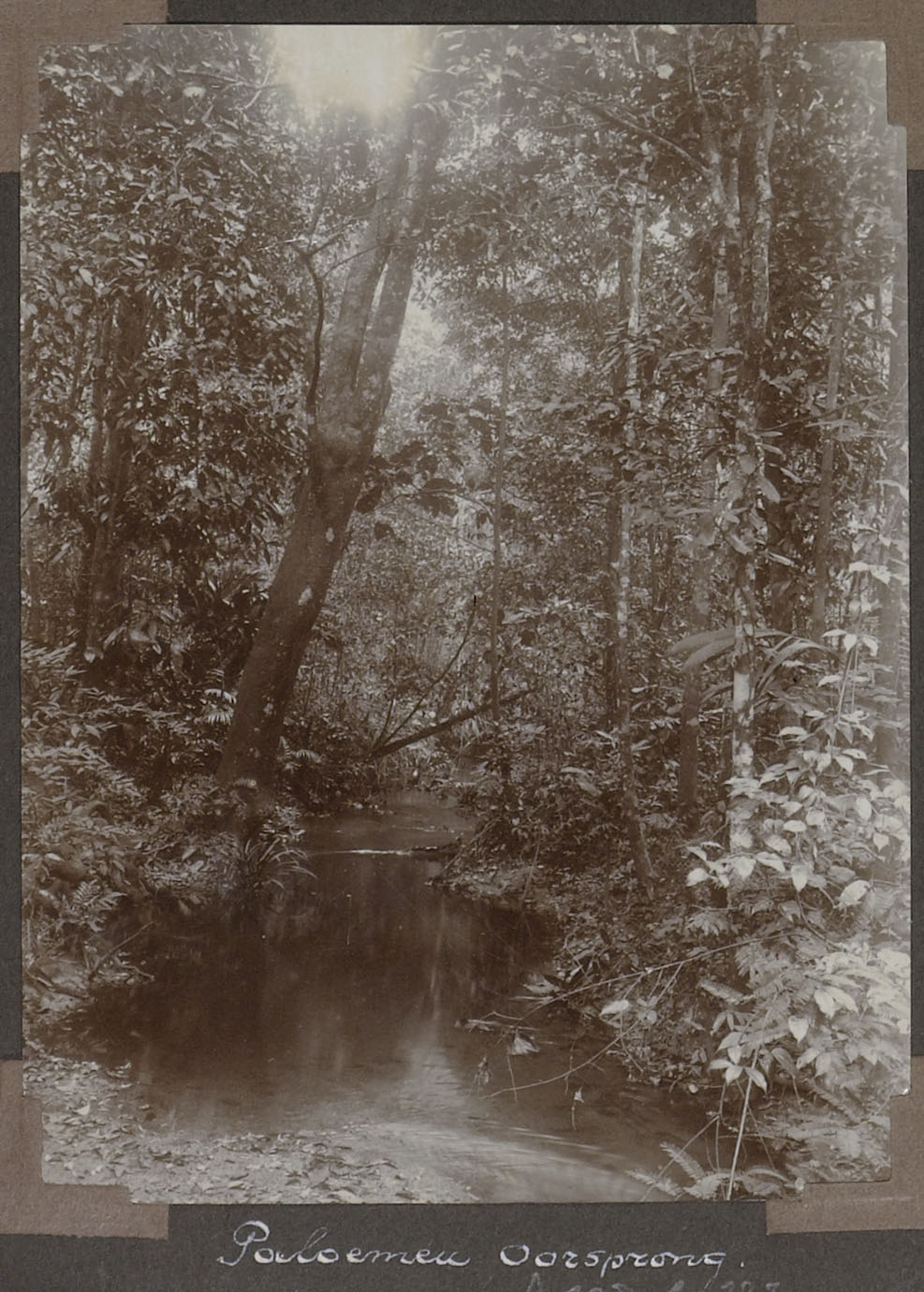
- Source of the Paloemeu River (1904)

Location
- Country: Suriname
- District: Sipaliwini District

Physical characteristics
- Source: Tumuk Humak Mountains
  - location: 2.4583°N 55.8083°W
- Mouth: Tapanahony River
  - location: 3°21′N 55°26′W

Basin features
- Progression: Tapanahony River→Marowijne River→Atlantic Ocean

Paloemeu River or Palumeu River is a river in the Sipaliwini District of Suriname. It joins the Tapanahony River at the village of Paloemeu.

== See also ==
- List of rivers of Suriname
