= Bakkie, Suriname =

Bakkie
- Resort
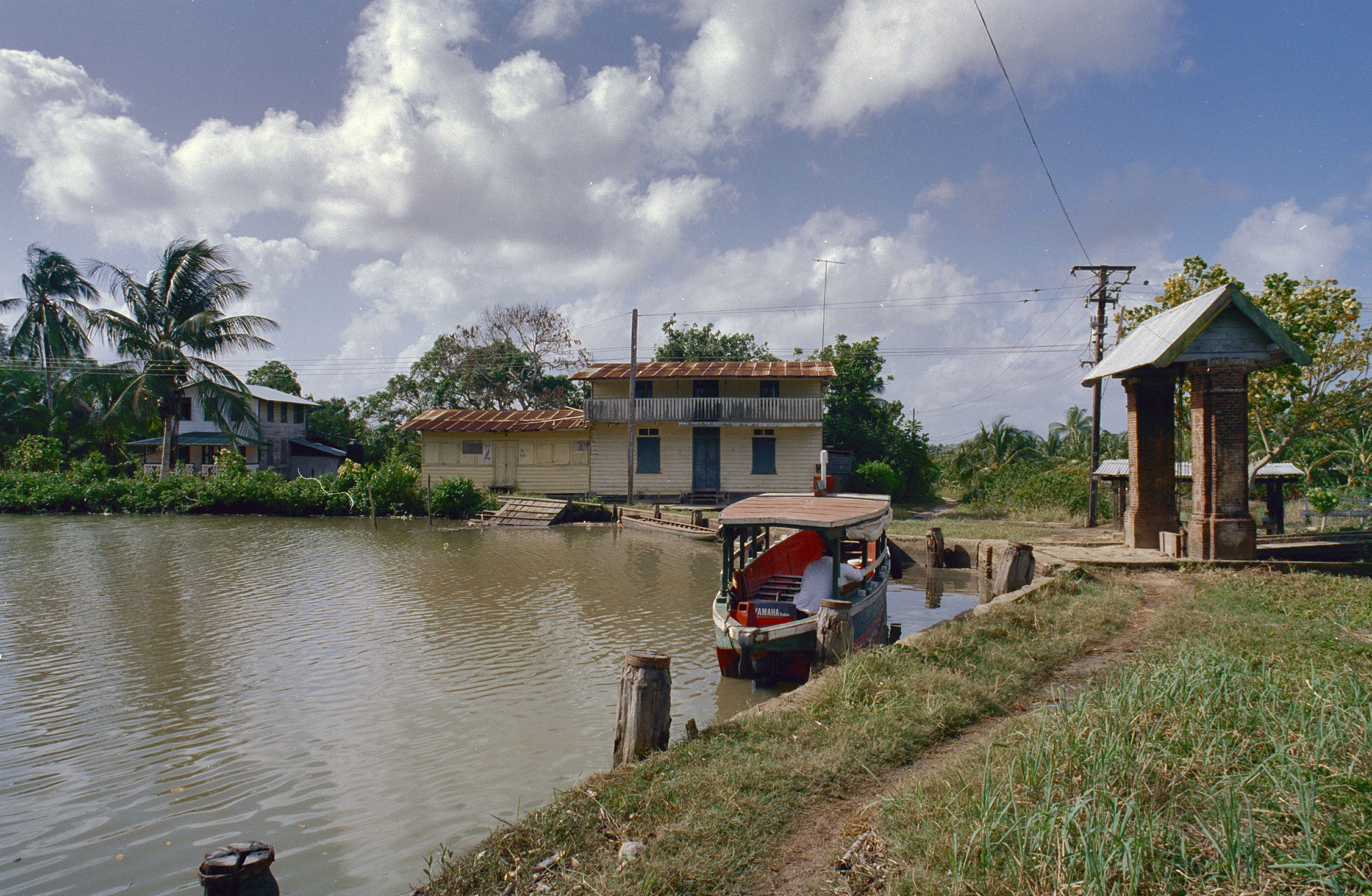
- The lock of Bakkie (1998)

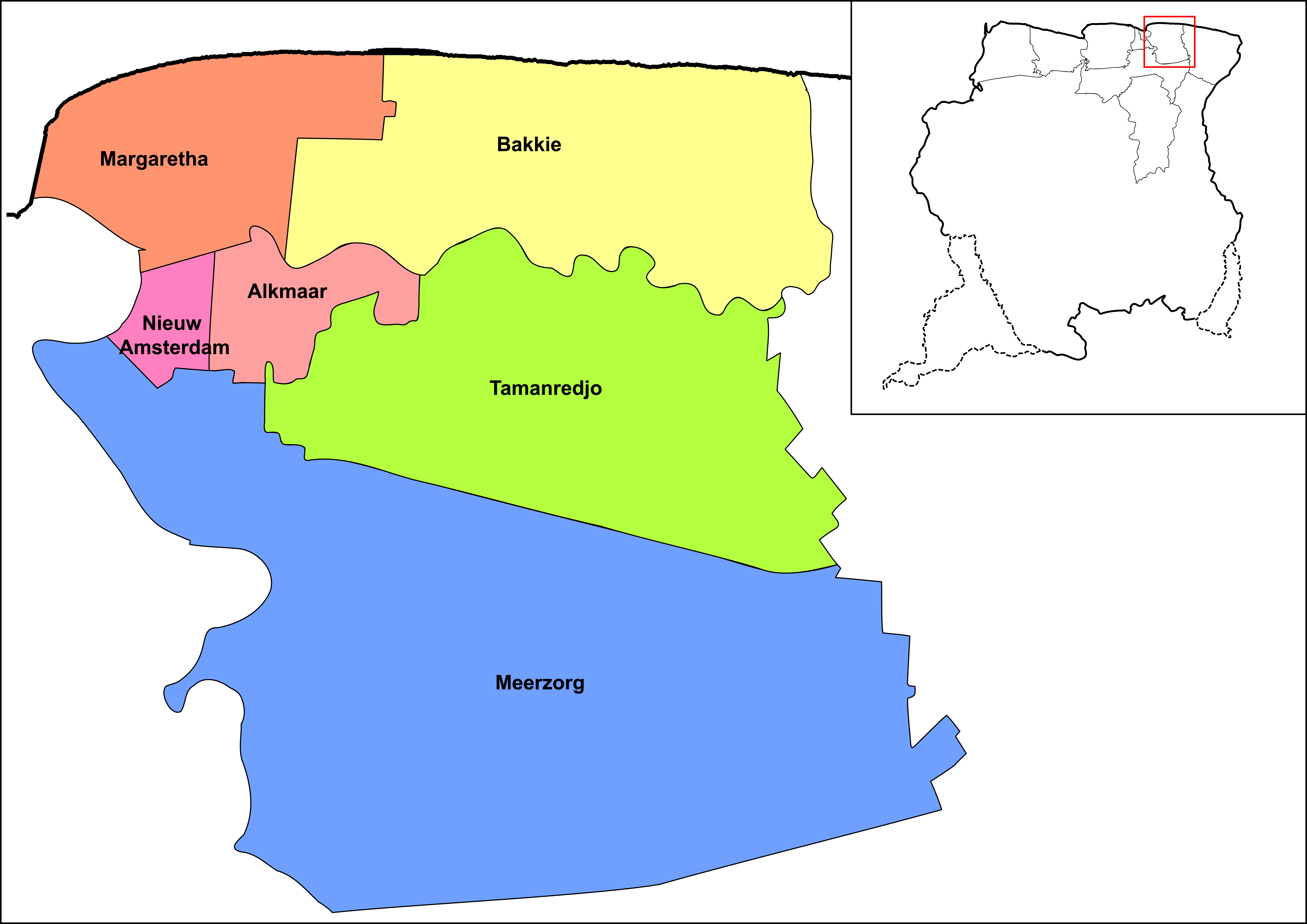
- Map showing resorts in Commewijne District. Bakkie
- Coordinates: 5°54′53″N 54°53′45″W
- Country: Suriname
- District: Commewijne District

Area
  - Total: 440 km^{2} (170 sq mi)

Population (2012)
  - Total: 447
  - Density: 1.0/km^{2} (2.6/sq mi)
- Time zone: UTC-3 (AST)

Bakkie (old name: Reynsdorp) is a resort and town in Suriname, located in the Commewijne District. Its population was 447 at the 2012 census (541 at the 2004 census). Around 1902, the coffee plantation Reynsdorp was bought by the government and parceled out in small allotments for immigrants who had served out their contracts. The resort lies along the Atlantic Ocean coastline. The resort of Bakkie can only be reached by boat.

The Museum of Bakkie, located in the village Reynsdorp (now better known as Bakkie) has an impressive collection of old bottles, prints, maps, paintings and many utensils.

Other villages in the Bakkie resort are Alliance, Ephrata, and Kronenburg

== See also ==
- List of museums in Suriname
