= Kortgene =

- Small city
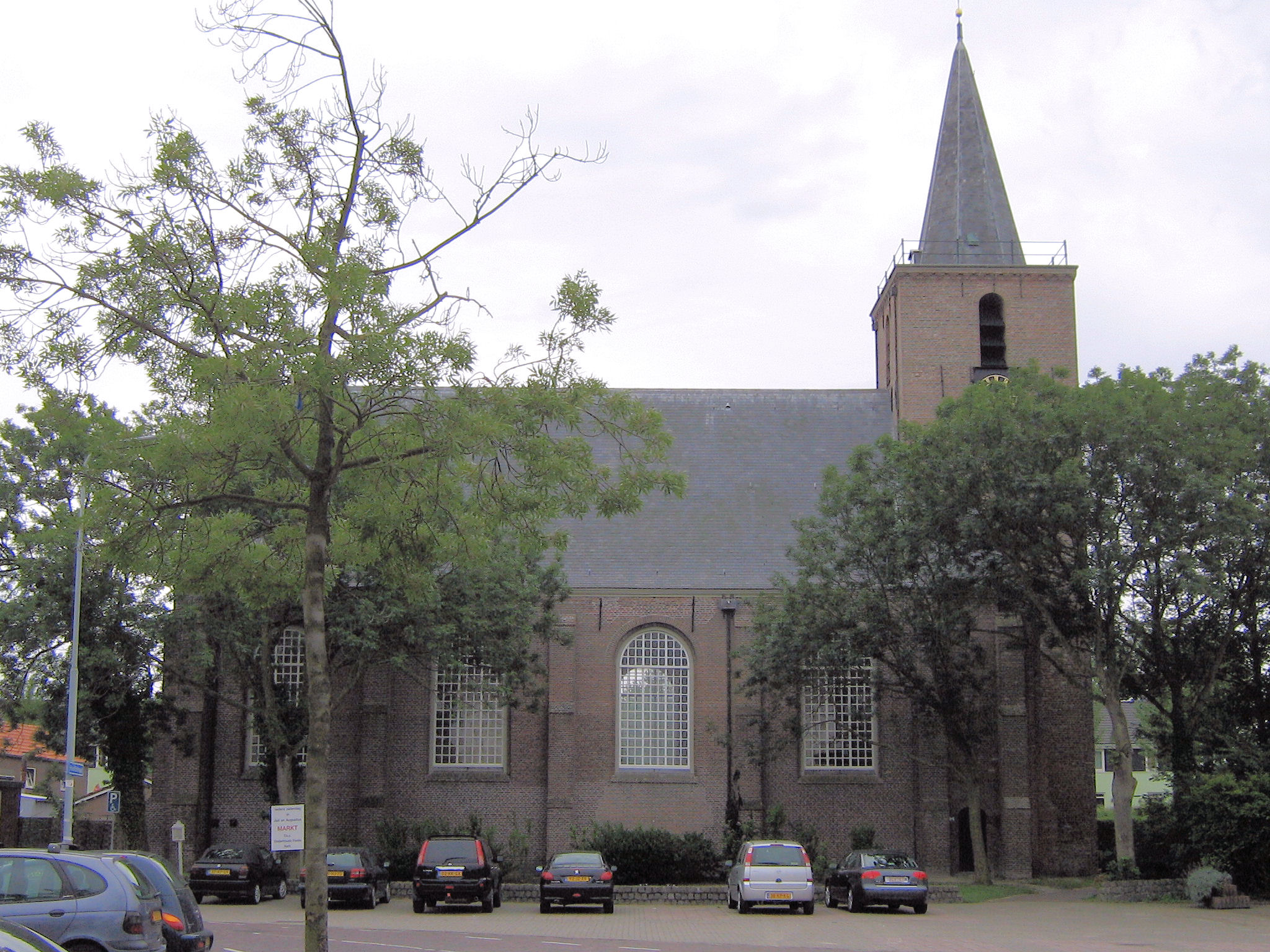
- Church of Korgene

- Flag Coat of arms

- Location in the province of Zeeland in the Netherlands Kortgene (Netherlands)
- Coordinates: 51°33′30″N 3°48′0″E
- Country: Netherlands
- Province: Zeeland
- Municipality: Noord-Beveland

Area
  - Total: 15.50 km^{2} (5.98 sq mi)
- Elevation: 0.9 m (3.0 ft)

Population (2021)
  - Total: 1,910
  - Density: 123/km^{2} (319/sq mi)
- Time zone: UTC+1 (CET)
  - Summer (DST): UTC+2 (CEST)
- Postal code: 4484
- Dialing code: 0113

Kortgene is a small city in the southwest Netherlands. It is located in the municipality of Noord-Beveland, Zeeland, about 15 km northeast of Middelburg. It received city rights in 1431, but was flooded in 1530 and 1532. The new settlement received city rights in 1684.

The town was first mentioned in 1247 as Cortkeen, and means "short creek". Kortgene received city rights in 1431, but disappeared in the floods of 1530 and 1532. In 1670, the area was given Willem Adriaan van Nassau who poldered the land. A village developed after the Stadspolder was enclosed by a dike in 1682. In 1684, the city rights were renewed.

== History ==
The city was established in part by the Dutch Reformed Church. Its oldest church building is a single-aisled church which a semi-built-in tower. The tower dates from the 15th century. The church was rebuilt in stages in 1686 and 1754. The interior was restored in 1955. Kortgene was home to 921 people in 1840.

Kortgene was flooded during the North Sea flood of 1953, and 49 people died. It developed into a recreational centre with marina and villa wards after the 1960s. Kortgene was an independent municipality and contained nearby villages Colijnsplaat and Kats until 1995, when it merged with municipality Wissenkerke into the new municipality of Noord-Beveland.

== Notable residents ==
- Arie van der Zouwen, football coach

== Gallery ==
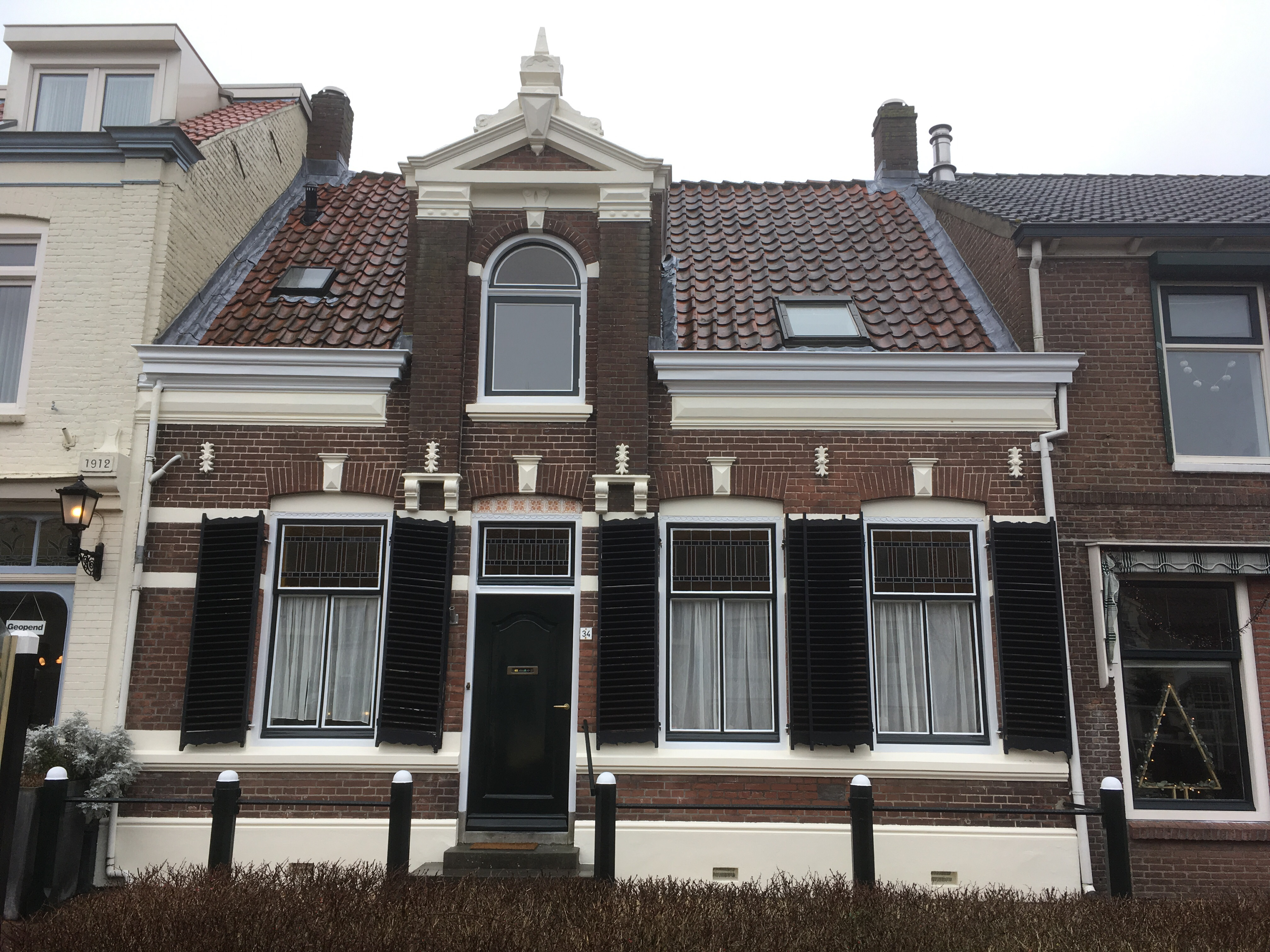
House in Kortgene

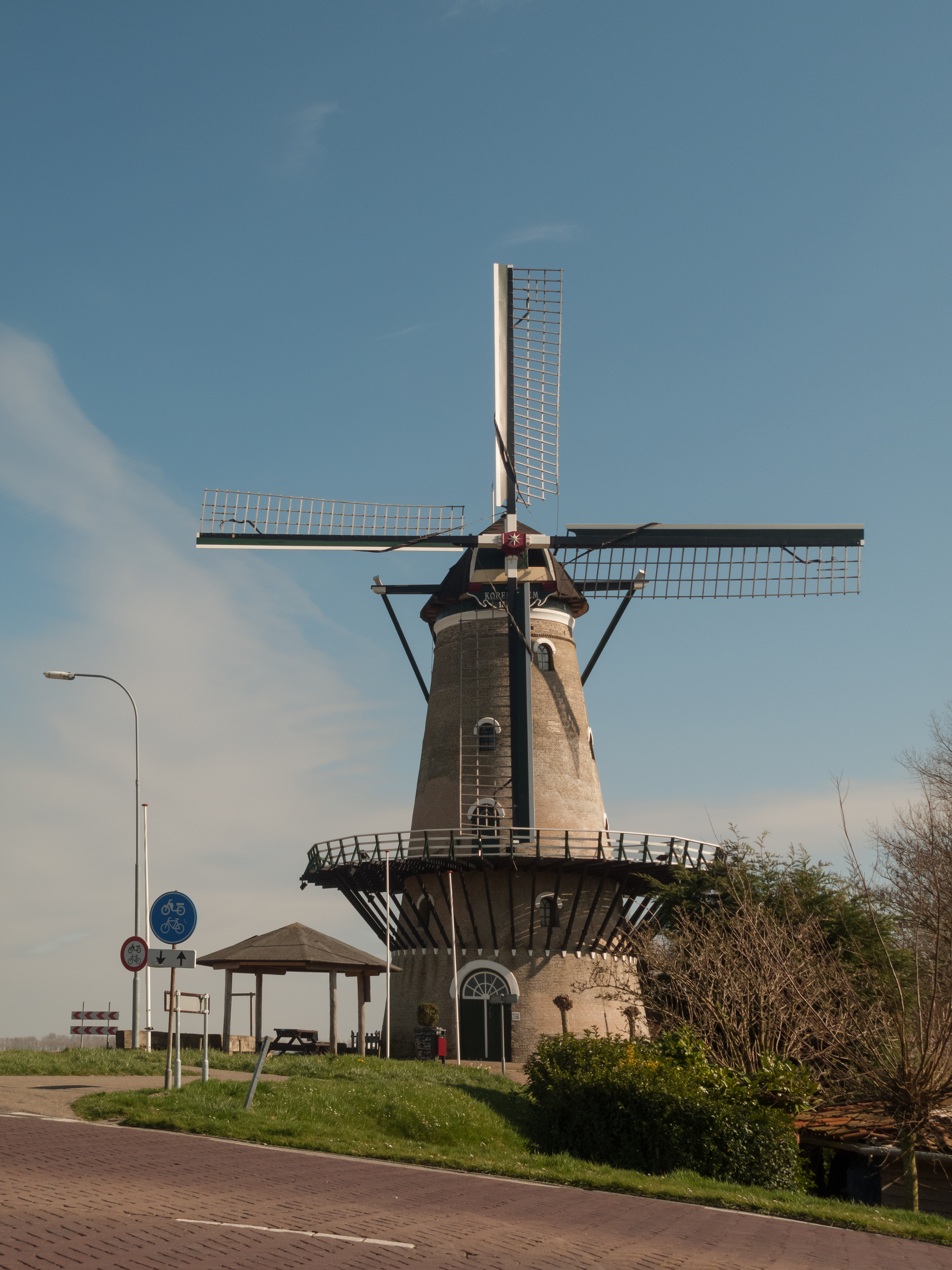
Kortgene, windmill: korenmolen de Korenbloem

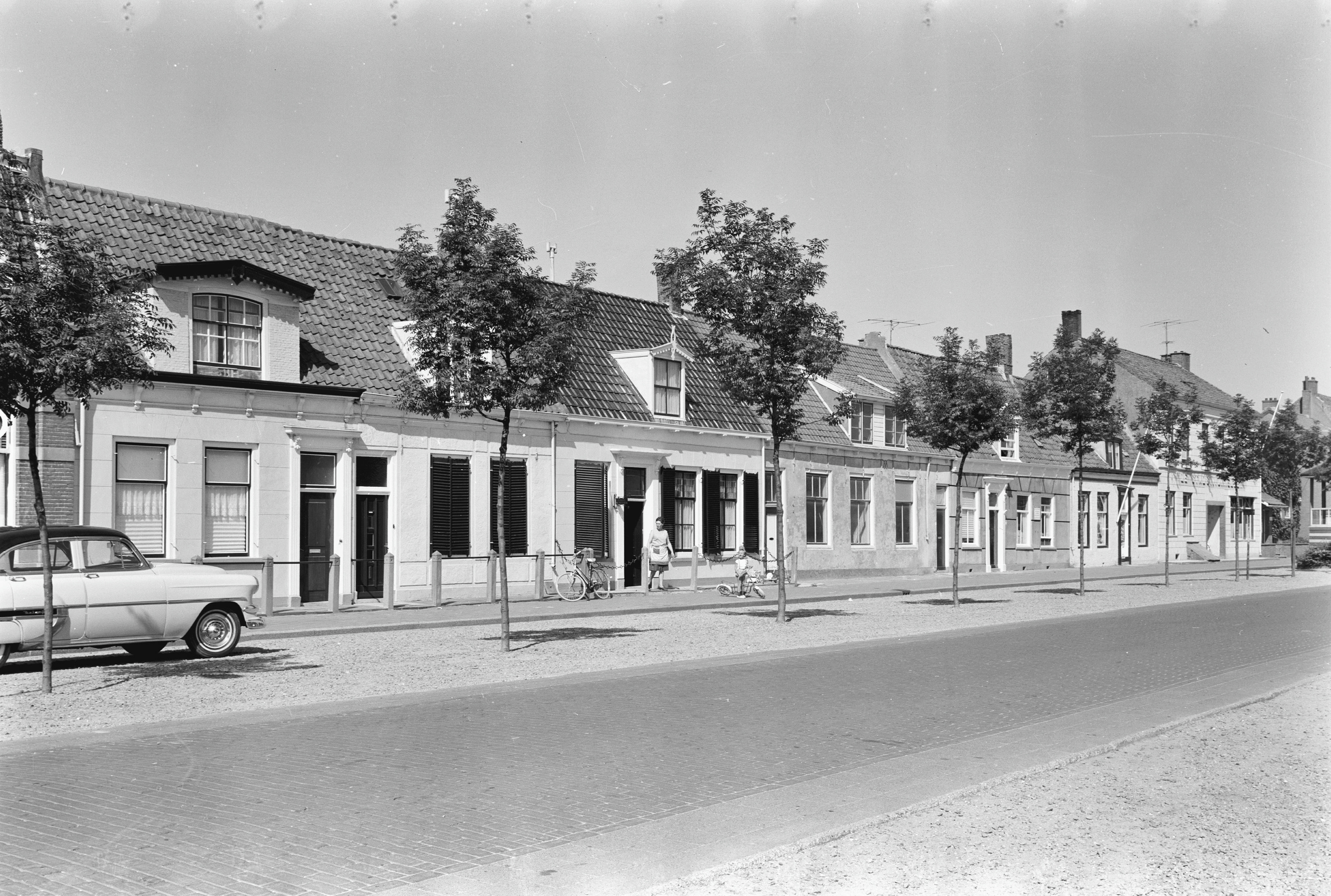
Street view
