= Lalla Rookh Museum =

Museums of Suriname

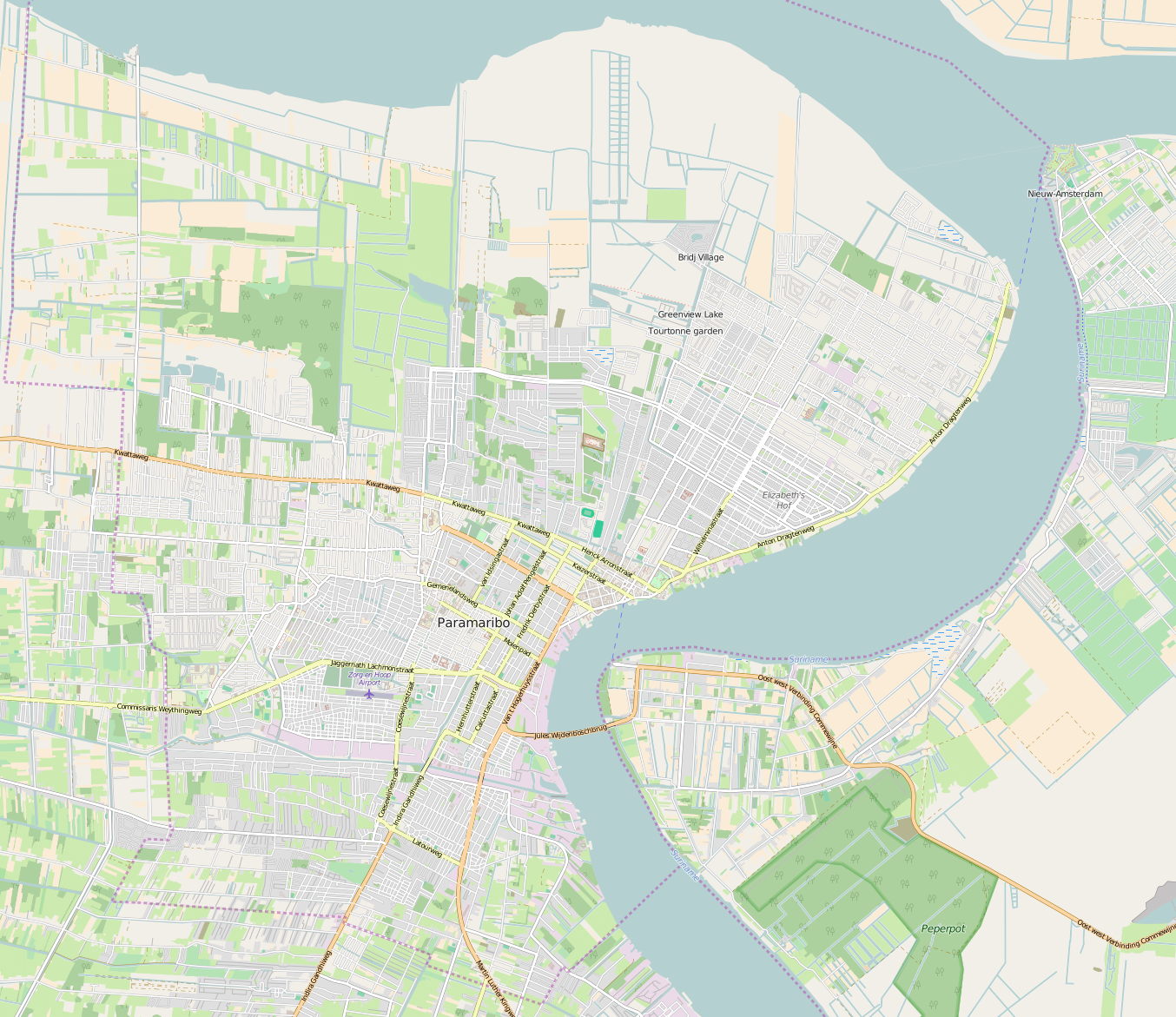
- Location within Paramaribo
- Established: 5 June 2016
- Location: Lalla Rookhweg 54, Paramaribo, Suriname
- Coordinates: 5.81513°N 55.20679°W

Lalla Rookh Museum is a museum about the Indo-Surinamese history and culture. It is located in the Lalla Rookh Complex in Paramaribo, Suriname.

== History ==
The museum was opened on 5 June 2016 by vice-president Ashwin Adhin at the 143rd anniversary of the first indentured labourers arriving in Suriname. The museum has been named after Lalla Rookh, the ship used to transport the workers from British India to Suriname.

== Collection ==
Polygoon documentary about the arrival of the Lalla Rookh (1973)

Before the opening, the Indo-Suriname community was asked to provide cultural and historical significant items like photos, articles, tools, clothing for the museum. The museum contains a burqi wagon (a donkey cart), and a replica of a pina hut, a hut made out of Açaí palm leaves. The collection is presented as a time line starting with the recruitment, states of origin (Uttar Pradesh and Bihar), arrival, transition to small scale agriculture up to the present.

== Activities ==
The museum organises monthly activities related to the Indo-Suriname community. Past themes included Suriname in World War II., the effect of Bollywood on Hindu music, and the strike at Mariënburg.

There is a special school program for children in the 5th and 6th grade.

== See also ==
- List of museums in Suriname
- Indian Caribbean Museum of Trinidad and Tobago
