= Alliance, Suriname =

Alliance
- Village and former plantation
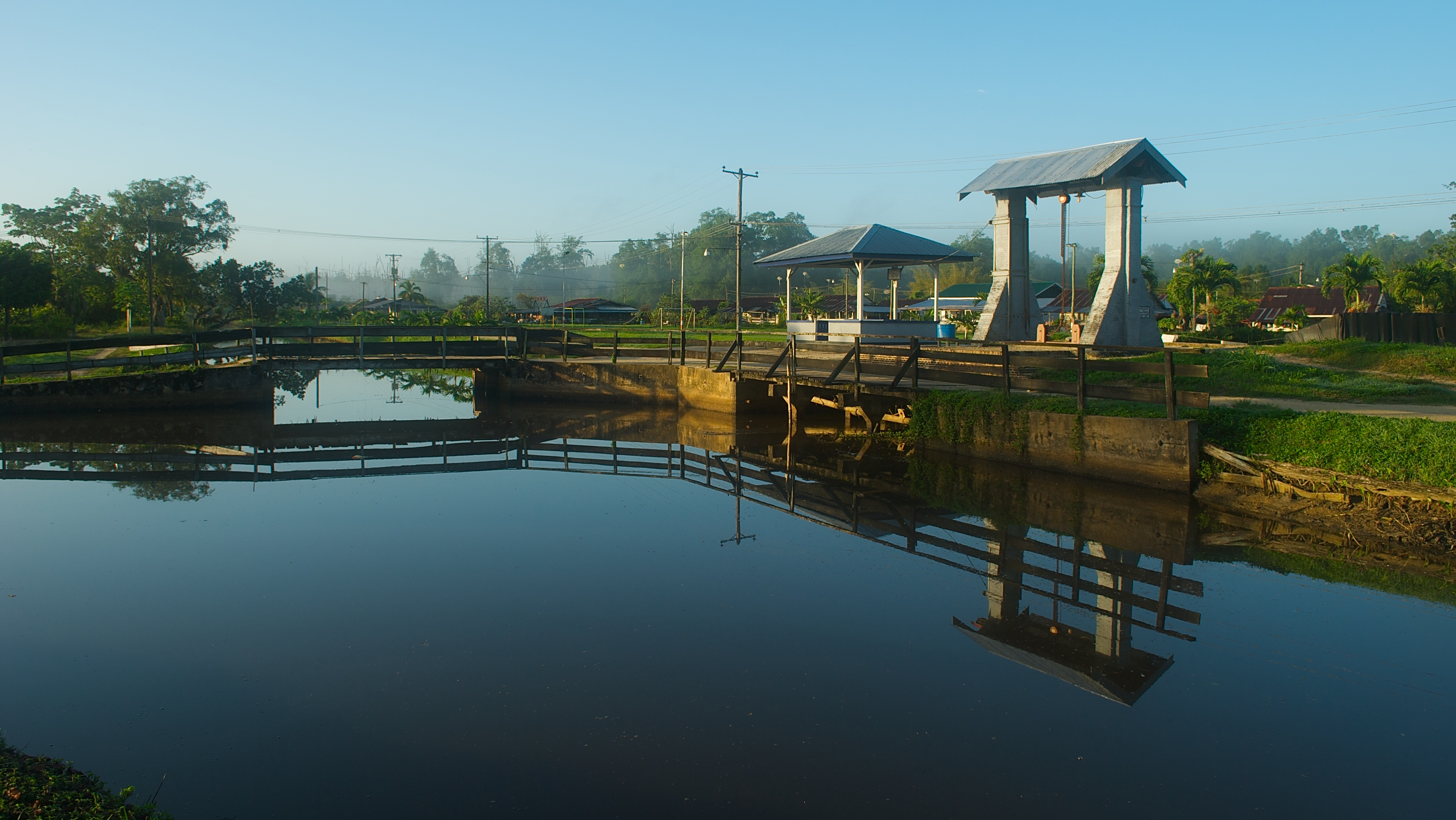

- Location in Suriname
- Coordinates: 5°54′N 54°54′W
- Country: Suriname
- District: Commewijne District
- Resort (municipality): Bakkie
- Time zone: UTC-3
- Climate: Am

Alliance is a village in Suriname, located on banks of the Suriname River in the district Commewijne.

== History ==
This used to be a plantation. In 1936 - 1956 the manager used to be G.N. Gummels.

== Geography ==
It is located on the right side of the Suriname River

== Economy ==
The economy is completely dependent on agriculture, mostly citrus. These then get sold in Paramaribo.

== Transport ==
One takes a boat at Alkmaar
