= Kronenberg =

Kronenberg may refer to:

- Cronenberg, Wuppertal, in North Rhine-Westphalia, Germany
- Kronenberg, Netherlands, in Limburg
- Kronenberg (surname)

== See also ==
- Cronenberg (disambiguation)
- Kronenburg (disambiguation)
- Kronenbourg Brewery
