= Kats, Netherlands =

Kats
- Village
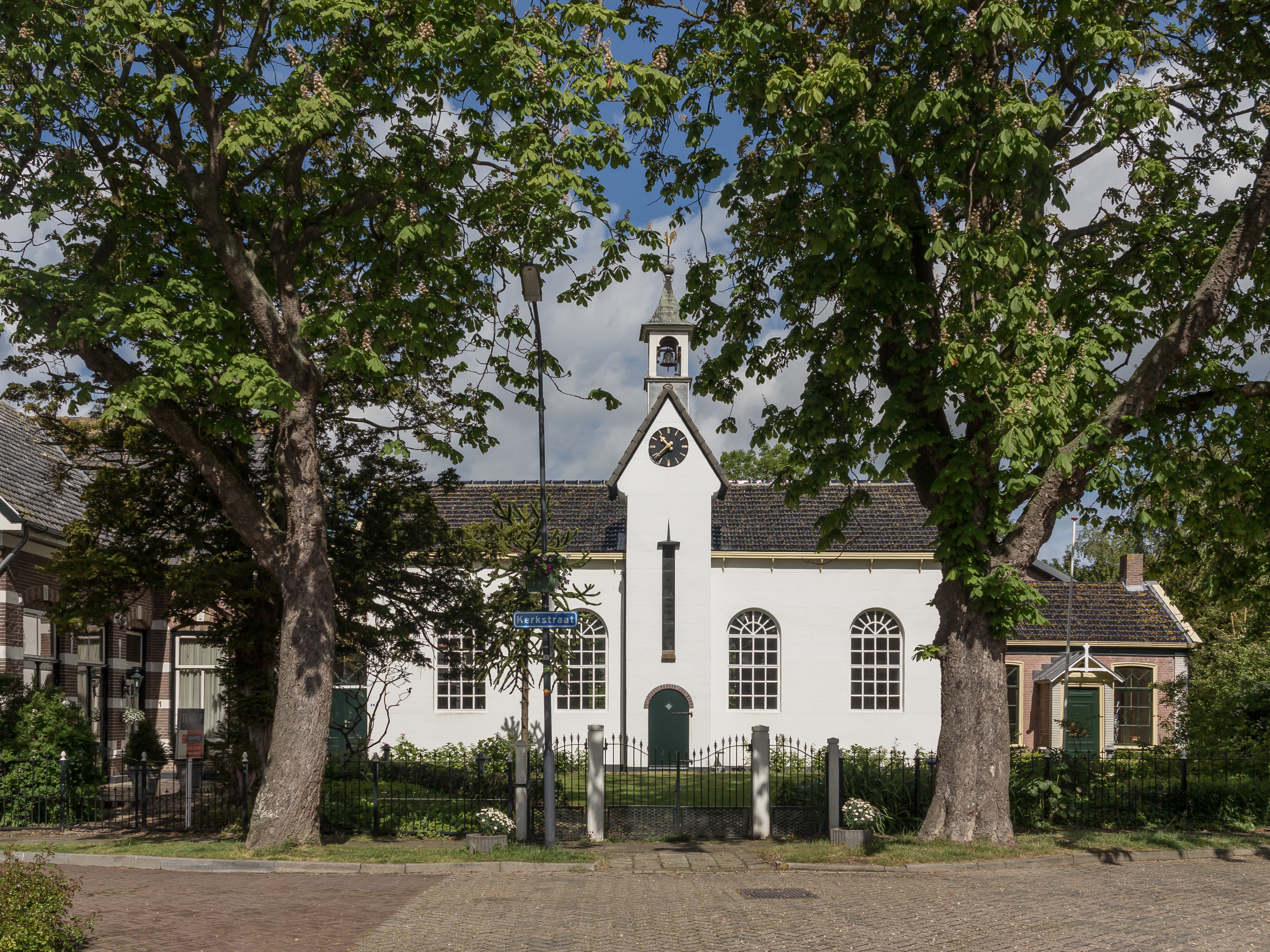
- Reformed church of Kats

- Coat of arms

- Location in the province of Zeeland in the Netherlands Kats (Netherlands)
- Coordinates: 51°34′N 3°53′E
- Country: Netherlands
- Province: Zeeland
- Municipality: Noord-Beveland

Area
  - Total: 9.57 km^{2} (3.69 sq mi)
- Elevation: 1.5 m (4.9 ft)

Population (1 January 2021)
  - Total: 450
  - Density: 47/km^{2} (120/sq mi)
- Time zone: UTC+1 (CET)
  - Summer (DST): UTC+2 (CEST)
- Postal code: 4485
- Dialing code: 0113

Kats is a village in the Dutch province of Zeeland. It is a part of the municipality of Noord-Beveland, and lies about 20 km east of Middelburg.

== History ==
The village was first mentioned in 1204 as Chats. The etymology is unknown.

In the Middle Ages Kats originally prospered as Suburchdijke the name alluding to connections with the nearby city of Souburg. The local inhabitants are referred to locally as katsenaers and 150 of them were drowned in flooding caused by a great storm on 5 November 1530, which engulfed the whole island, then in 1532 the Elizabeth Flood swept away all the remaining buildings. Poldering Noord Beveland (the process the Dutch invented to reclaim land from the sea) did not start again until 1598 - the villages of Colijnsplaat and Kats were both built on estates at right angles to each other.

The Dutch Reformed church originally dates from 1660. In 1870, it was extensively modified. The tower with gable roof were added between 1951 and 1952.

Kats was home to 401 people in 1840. In 1853, the Abrahampolder was created, and the harbour was moved to the north east.

Kats used to be an independent municipality. In 1941, it was merged into the municipality of Kortgene. In 1995, it became part of Noord Beveland.

== Notable people ==
- Dirk Geijskes (1907–1985), Dutch biologist, ethnologist and curator
