= Kronenburg B.V. =

Dutch fire-service vehicles manufacturer

- Industry: Trucks & Other Vehicles
- Founded: 1823
- Headquarters: Wanroij, Netherlands
- Products: Fire and Rescue Vehicles
- Website: www.kronenburgfire.com

The Kronenburg B.V. company is a fire-service vehicles manufacturer, based in Wanroij, Netherlands. The company was founded by the Kronenburg family in 1823.

Kronenburg B.V. supplies thousands of fire trucks to many countries. Its trucks serve in military and civil airports, petrochemical industries and municipal fire brigades.

old logo of company

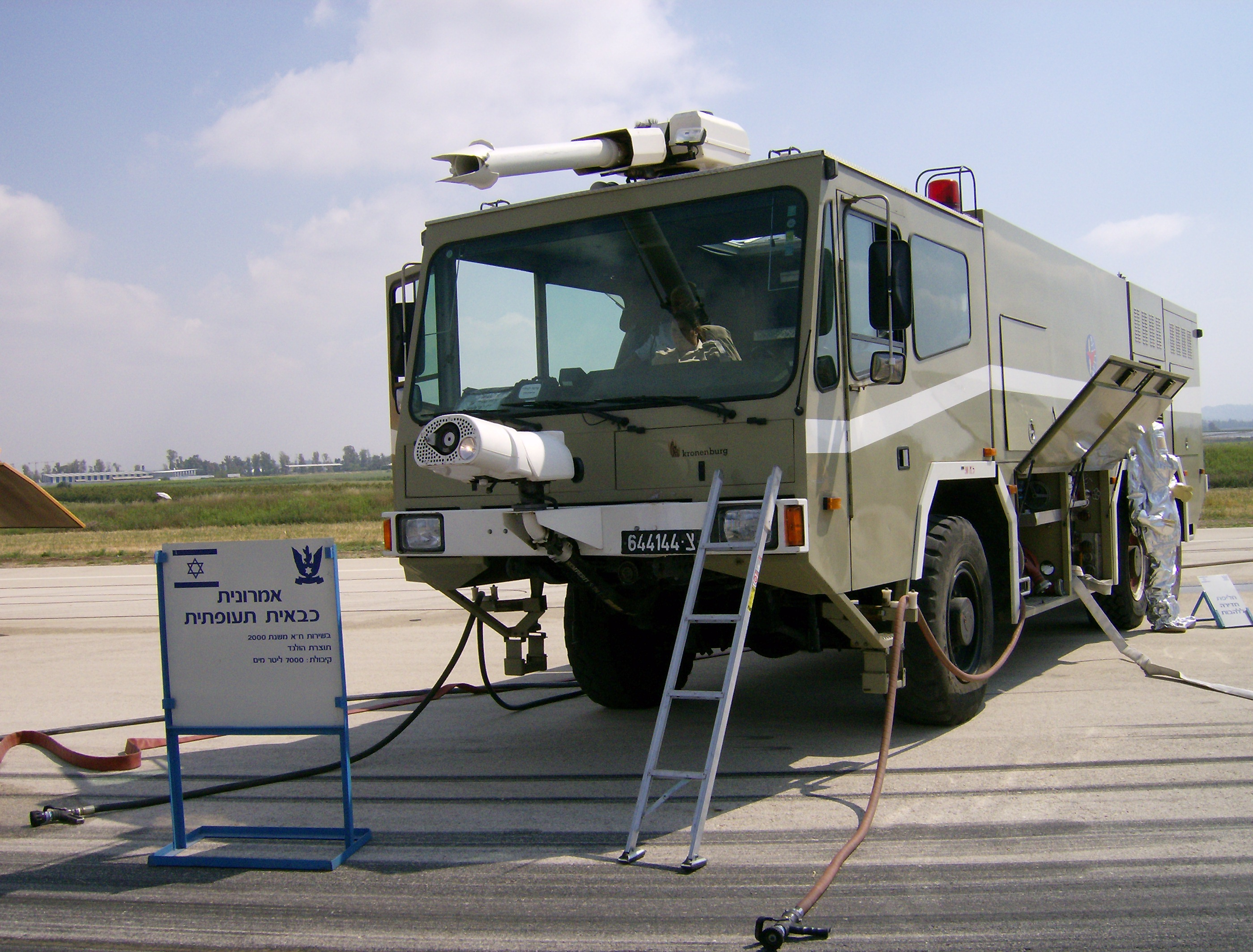
Kronenburg MAC 08-7000 military Airport crash tender, Israeli Air Force

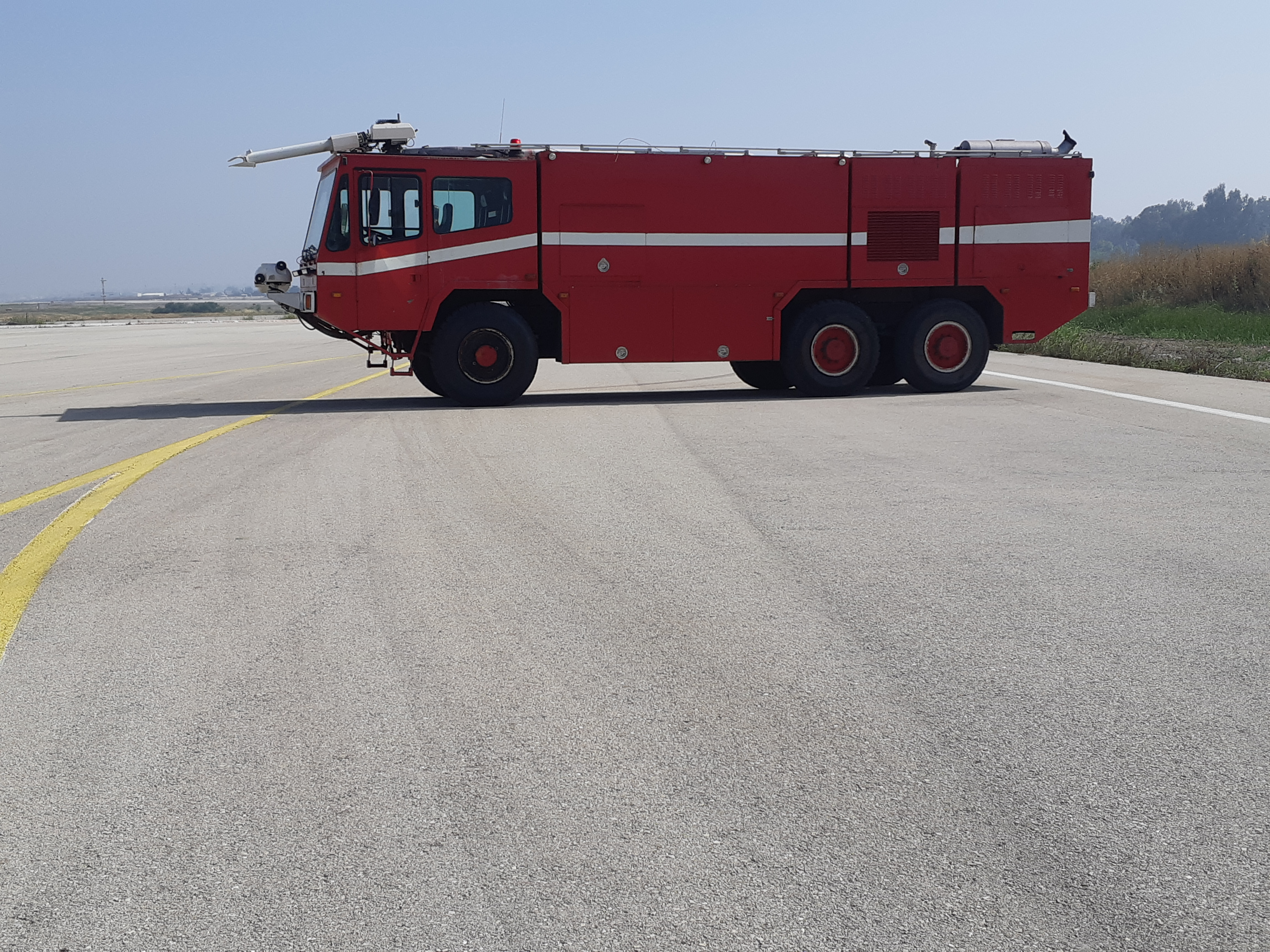
Kronenburg MAC 08-7000 military Airport crash tender, Israeli Air Force, Tel Nof Airbase

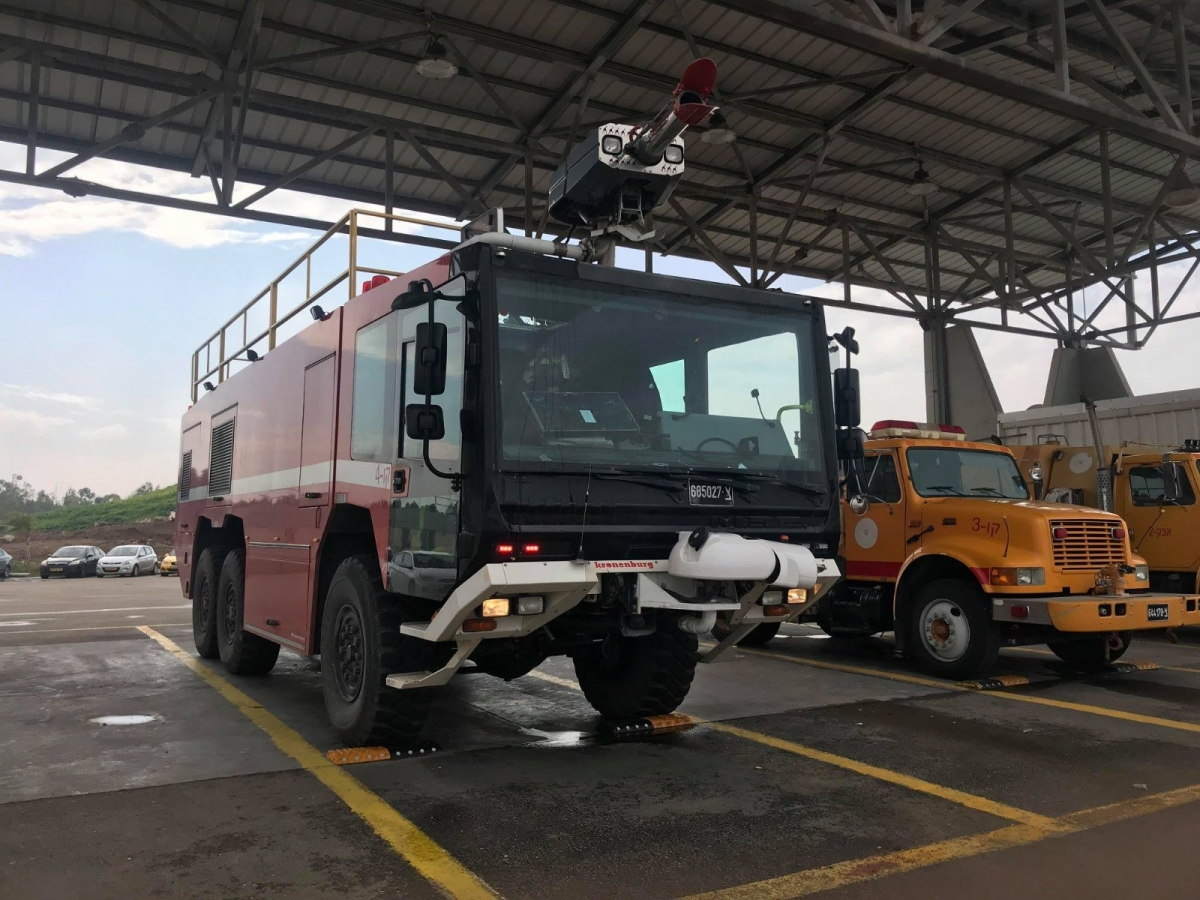
Kronenburg MAC CT012 military Airport crash tender, Israeli Air Force
