= Paloemeu =

Paloemeu Palumeu
- Village
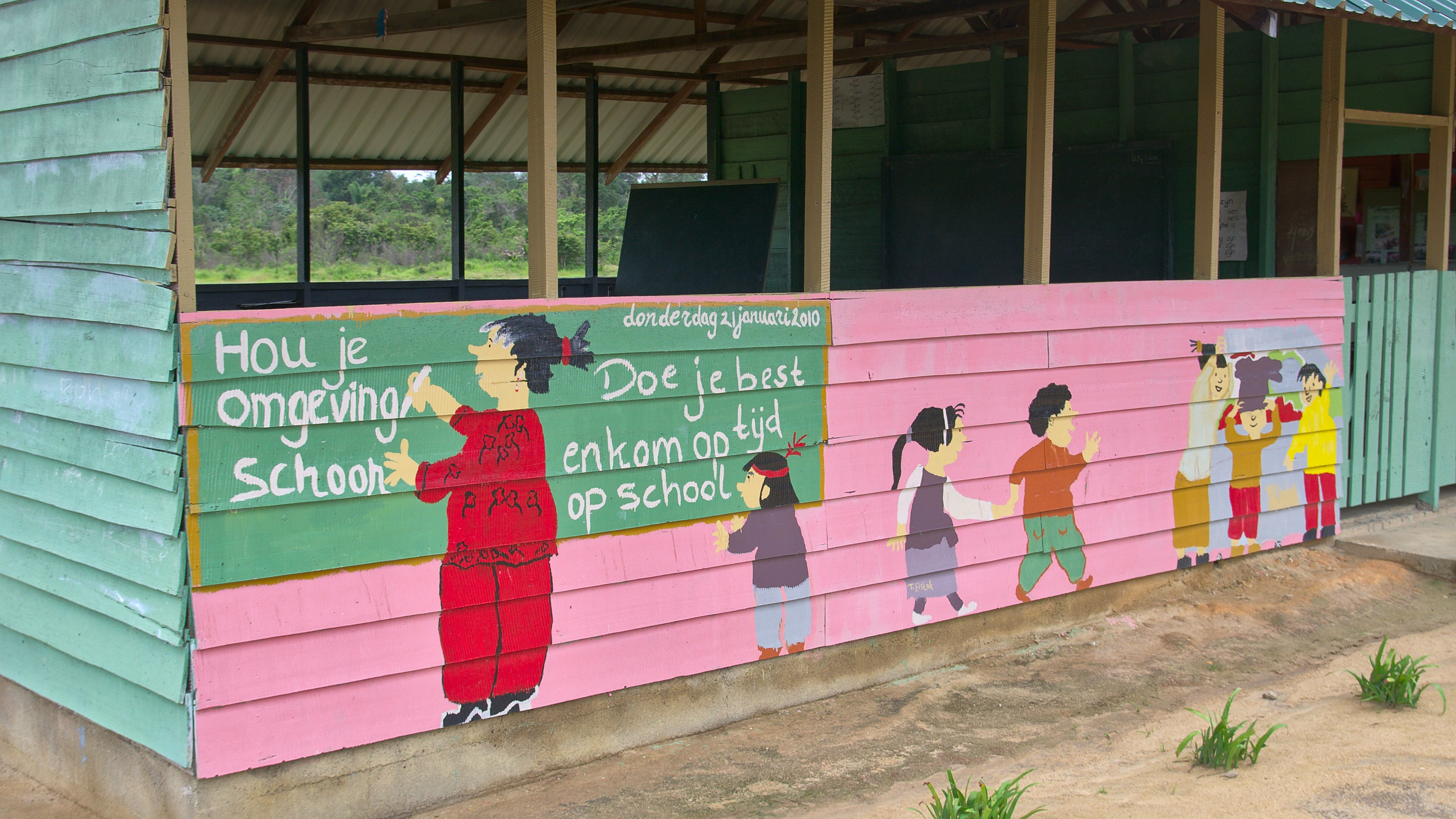
- Primary school in Paloemeu

- Location in Suriname
- Coordinates: 3°20′43″N 55°26′35″W
- Country: Suriname
- District: Sipaliwini District
- Resort (municipality): Tapanahony

Government
  - Head captain: Essikeo Japawai

Population (2020)
  - Total: 283

Paloemeu or Palumeu is an Amerindian village in the interior of Suriname, situated at the site where the Paloemeu River joins the Tapanahoni River. Most inhabitants of the village are Native Tiriyó Amerindians. The remainder belongs to the Wayana, and Aparai tribes. The Bosatlas in 1968 identified the village as Pepejoe which was incorrect according to the New West Indian Guide.

== Overview ==
The village was visited three times by basiya Lodewijk Schmidt, a Saramaka Maroon from Gansee, who had been hired by the Surinamese government to contact and map the Amerindians living in the interior of Suriname. On 18 January 1942, during his third expedition, Schmidt van Gansee installed Joeloe as the first Captain of the Tiriyó on Paloemeu River. The village chief in 2022 was Essikeo Japawai.

Paloemeu is home to a primary school, and a Medische Zending healthcare centre.

Paloemeu can be reached by the river or via the Vincent Fayks Airport. The 718 metre high Kasikasima mountain is located about 65 kilometres (40 mi) from the village. The journey will take 3 to 7 hours by boat. There is a jungle ecotourism resort on the Tapanahony River for tourists.

== Energy ==
Since the early 2000s there have been efforts to construct a micro hydroelectric power plant in the Panato creek to provide Paloemeu with electricity. These efforts were initiated by the Dutch entrepreneur Arnout van de Werken. Several difficulties, including the flooding of the small reservoir in 2005, have hampered the project. As of 2014, Palumeu still does not have full day electricity, and continues to rely on the few hours of diesel-generated electricity provided by the government.
