= Ephrata, Suriname =

Populated place in Suriname

Ephrata
- Village
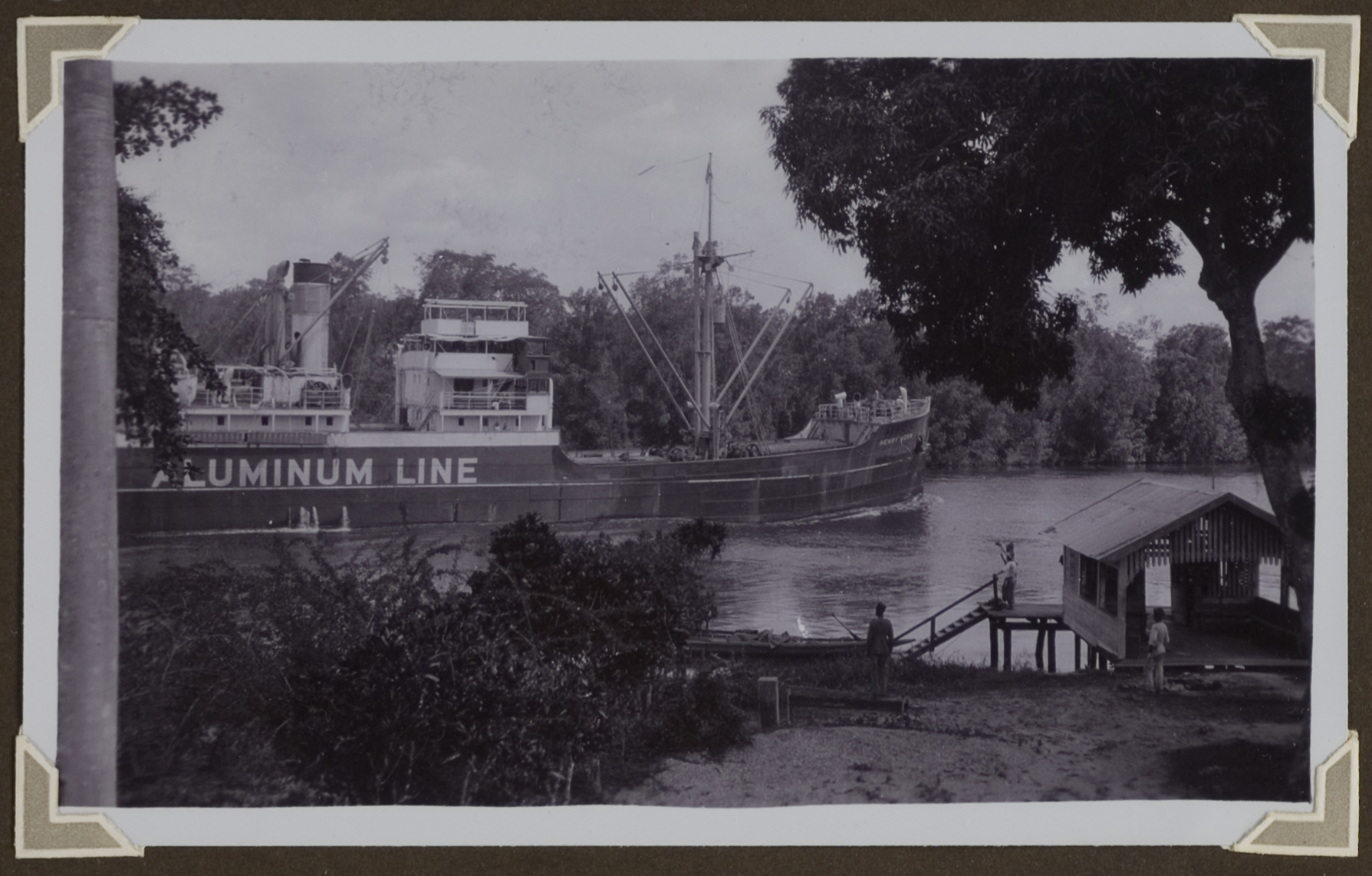
- Bauxite ship on the Cottica River near Ephrata
- Country: Suriname
- District: Commewijne District
- Resort: Bakkie

Area
  - Total: 81 km^{2} (31 sq mi)
- Elevation: 0 m (0 ft)
- Time zone: UTC-3 (AST)
- Climate: Af

Ephrata was a village located within the Bakkie resort of the Commewijne District of Suriname.

Ephrata started as a sugar plantation, and had been documented as early as 20 November 1708. The plantation is located on the Cottica River. The surname "van Ephrata" (English: from Ephrata) is often used by Boni Maroons.
