= Kronenburg, Suriname =

Kronenburg
- Village
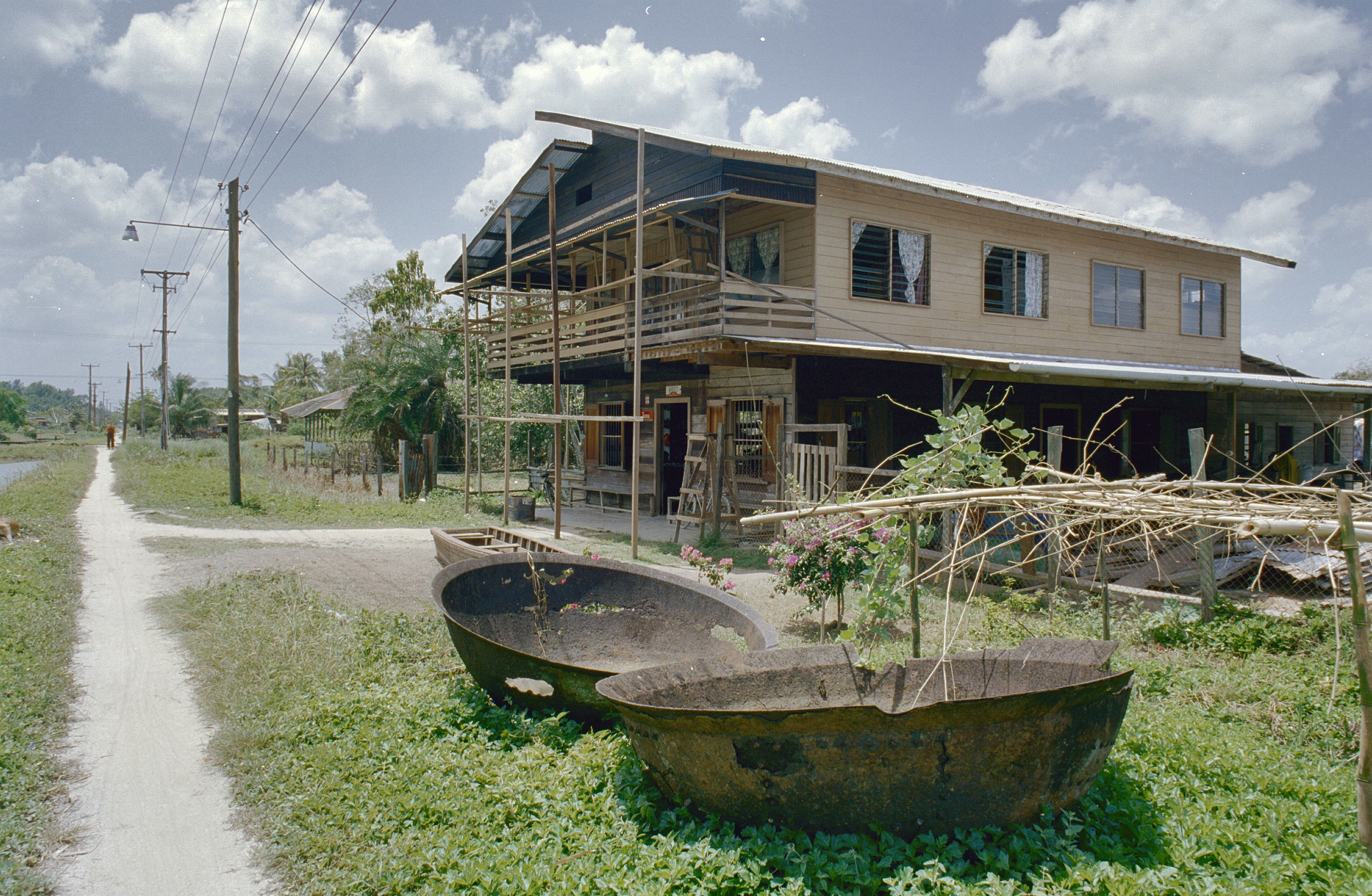
- House in Kronenburg

- Location within Suriname
- Coordinates: 5.8687°N 55.0086°W
- Country: Suriname
- District: Commewijne District
- Resorts: Bakkie
- Time zone: UTC-3 (AST)

Kronenburg (also Kroonenburg) is a village in the Bakkie resort of the district of Commewijne in Suriname. Kroonenburg was originally a coffee and cotton plantation founded in 1745 by Johannes van der Gaegh.

Kroonenburg was established as a village in 1940, and defined as the plantations Kronenburg, Rijnberk, Schaapstede, and Goede Vriendschap. In 1949, the village had a population of 1,504 people. In 1987, the village communities were dissolved, and Kroonenburg became part of the Bakkie resort (municipality). In 2012, the population of the resort had declined to 447 people.

Since 1948, the Hindu community centre of Shánti Dal is located in the village. The plant extraction and seed company Surplant is located in the village.

The village can be reached by ferry from Mon Tresor.
