= Tafelberg, Suriname =

Mountain in Suriname

Tafelberg
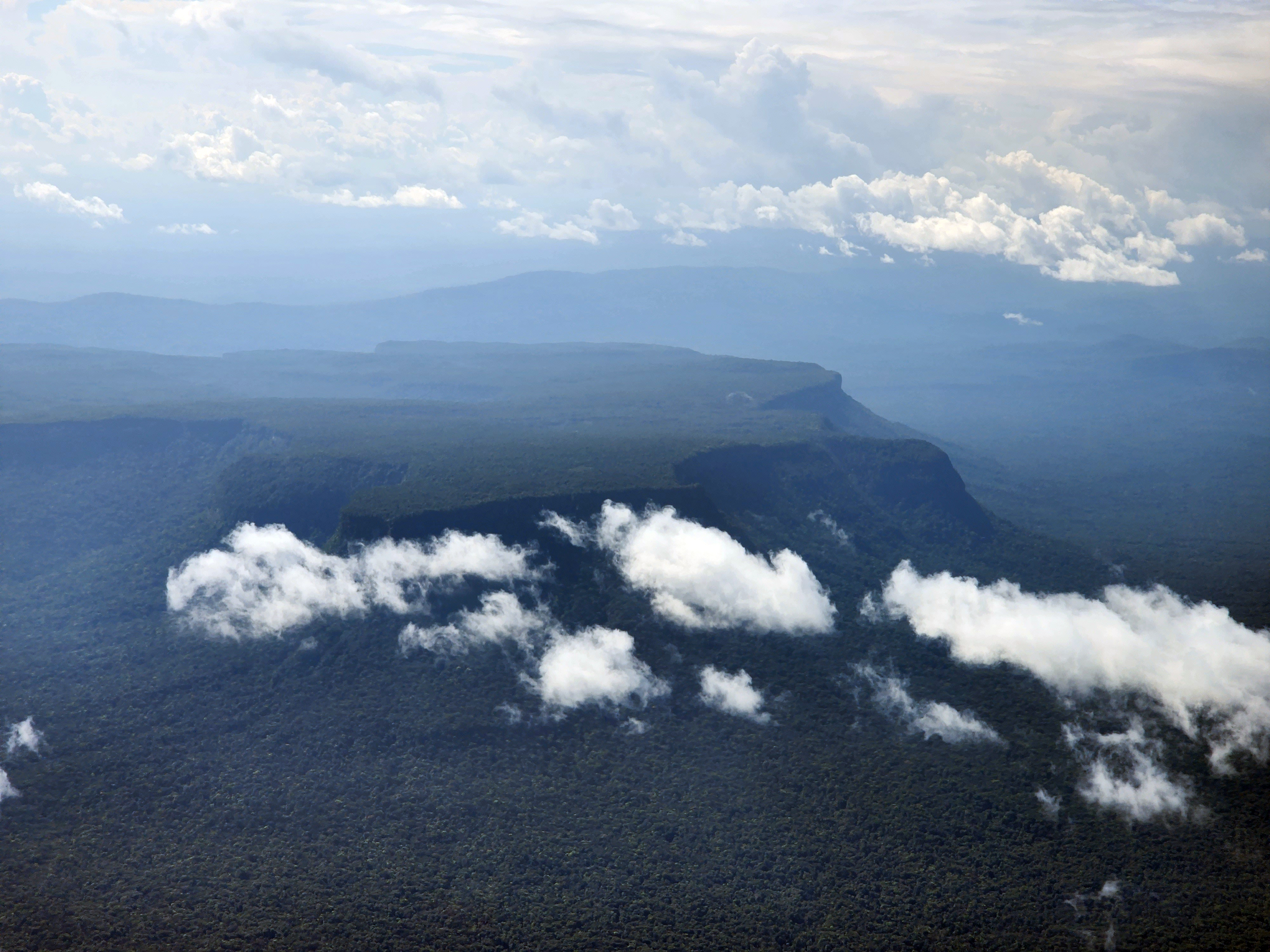

Highest point
- Elevation: 1,026 m (3,366 ft)
- Coordinates: 3°54′30″N 56°10′20″W

Geography
- Location within Suriname
- Location: Sipaliwini District, Suriname
- Parent range: Wilhelmina Mountains

Tafelberg (literally "Table Mountain") is one of the highest mountains in Suriname at 1,026 metres (3,366 ft). It is a tepui and is part of the Tafelberg Nature Reserve. The mountain is in the Sipaliwini District. The Rudi Kappel Airstrip, former name: Tafelberg Airstrip, is nearby. In 1943, the mountain was climbed for the first time by the Coppename River expedition led by Dirk Geijskes.

== Notable disasters ==
- (Suriname (Kingdom of the Netherlands)) In 1944 US Air Force Captain Atkinson while on a reconnaissance flight over the South of Suriname, had to make a crashlanding on the Tafelberg. Fortunately he was rescued after a few days by a military search and rescue expedition.
- (Suriname (Kingdom of the Netherlands)) On 25 October 1968 a Douglas C-47A PH-DAA of KLM Aerocarto flew into the Tafelberg following an engine failure whilst on a survey flight. The aircraft collided with the mountain in cloud, killing three of the five people on board.
