= Dirk Geijskes =

Dutch biologist, ethnologist and curator

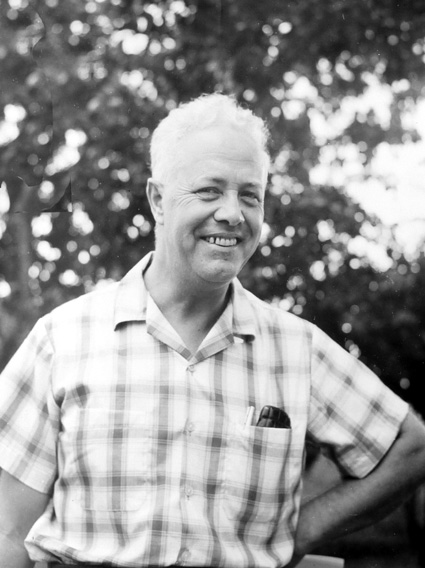
- Geijskes (c. 1960)
- Born: Dirk Cornelis Geijskes; 16 May 1907; Kats, Netherlands
- Died: 27 September 1985 (aged 78); Leiden, Netherlands
- Occupations: Biologist, ethnologist, curator
- Known for: Director Surinaams Museum, dragonfly collection Naturalis, expeditions to the interior of Suriname

Dirk Cornelis Geijskes (16 May 1907 – 27 September 1985) was a Dutch biologist, ethnologist and curator. He was the first director of the Surinaams Museum. As a biologist, he specialised in dragonflies. He would lead many expeditions into the interior of Suriname. In 1967, he became curator at the Rijksmuseum van Natuurlijke Historie where he started the dragonfly collection. Geijskes is the author of 123 publications, and 25 species have been named after him.

== Biography ==
Geijskes was born on 16 May 1907 in Kats, Netherlands. In 1927, he went to Leiden University to study biology. In 1929, he travelled to Trinidad to study dragonflies which would become his speciality. Next, he went to the University of Basel, and in 1935 obtained his doctorate magna cum laude for a thesis on the fauna and ecology of the Swiss Jura. In 1936, he first described Brevipalpus phoenicis which was later discovered to be the main factor for Citrus leprosis disease.

In 1938, Geijskes started to work as an entomologist for the Landbouwproefstation (Experimental agricultural station) in Suriname. During his stay in Suriname, Geijskes would lead many expeditions into the interior. In 1939, he went to the Litany River to study the poisoned arrows of the Wayana people. In 1941, he participated in the Paroe Savanna expedition to the Tiriyó people. In 1943, he embarked on the Coppename River expedition during which the Tafelberg was climbed for the first time. In 1948 and 1949, he led an expedition from the coastal area across the Nassau Mountains. The expedition collected about 10,000 specimens including 1,500 butterflies.

In 1954, Geijskes would become government biologist and the first director of the Surinaams Museum. In 1958, he led an expedition to the Tafelberg with Rudi Kappel to examine the savannah around the mountain, and investigate whether an airstrip could be built there. The successful construction of an airstrip led to Operation Grasshopper in 1959 which mapped the natural resources in the interior.

On 2 May 1965, Geijskes returned for the Netherlands, and in 1967 started to work as curator at the Rijksmuseum van Natuurlijke Historie (nowadays Naturalis). where he started the dragonfly collection. In 2015, the collection contained 20,000 species. In the Netherlands, he also would become a member of the Royal Netherlands Academy of Arts and Sciences in 1959 but he resigned in 1965. He would also become and editor of the New West Indian Guide.

Geijskes died on 27 September 1985 in Leiden, at the age of 78.

== Legacy and honours ==
Upon return to the Netherlands, Geijskes became officer in the Order of Orange Nassau. He was awarded a bronze medal by the Royal Dutch Geographical Society.

Geijskes is the author of 123 publications, and 25 species have been named after him. In 1970, the dragonfly genus Lauromacromia was created by Geijskes. In 2011, it held six species.

== Sources ==
- Dierick, W. (1985). "In memoriam dr. D.C. Geijskes". OSO. Tijdschrift voor Surinaamse Taalkunde, Letterkunde en Geschiedenis (in Dutch).
- Gernaat, Hajo; Beckles, Borgesius (2007). "De dagvlinders van Suriname". OSO. Tijdschrift voor Surinaamse taalkunde, letterkunde en geschiedenis (in Dutch).
- Wagenaar Hummelinck, P. (1972). "To Dr Dirk Cornelis Geijskes on his 65th birthday" (PDF). Odonatologica. 4.
