= Vincent Fayks Airstrip =

Vincent Fajks Airstrip
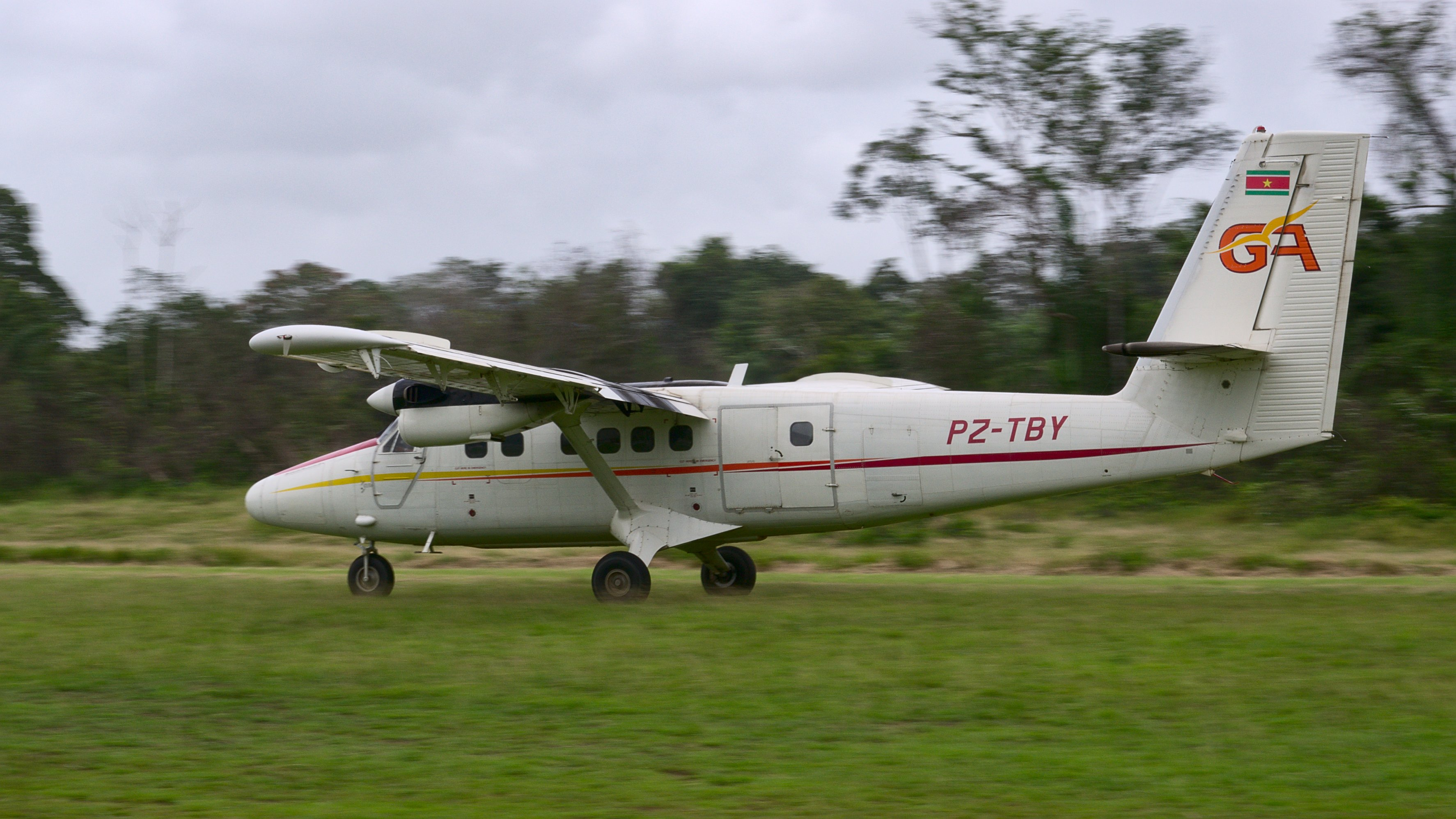
- IATA: OEM; ICAO: SMPA

Summary
- Airport type: Public
- Operator: Luchtvaartdienst Suriname
- Location: Paloemeu, Suriname
- Elevation AMSL: 10 ft / 3 m
- Coordinates: 3°20′45″N 55°26′30″W

Map
- Location in Suriname

Runways
Direction	Length		Surface
Direction	m	ft	Surface
11/29	650	2,133	grass
- Sources: GCM Bing Maps

Vincent Fajks Airstrip (IATA: OEM, ICAO: SMPA) is an airstrip serving Paloemeu, Suriname. The airport was constructed as part of Operation Grasshopper. It was named after the Polish pilot Vincent Fajks who crashed with co-pilot Ronald Kappel with their Aero Commander AC 520 (PZ-TAG) airplane at the site in October 1959, while trying to deliver building materials for the airport. They both received a state funeral in Paramaribo on 11 October 1959. There is a jungle resort on the Tapanahony River near Paloemeu.

== Charters and destinations ==
Charter airlines serving this airport are:

Airlines	Destinations
Blue Wing Airlines	Charter: Paramaribo–Zorg en Hoop
Gum Air	Charter: Paramaribo–Zorg en Hoop
Hi-Jet Helicopter Services	Charter: Paramaribo–Zorg en Hoop

== See also ==
- List of airports in Suriname
- Transport in Suriname
