= Biodiversity of Suriname =

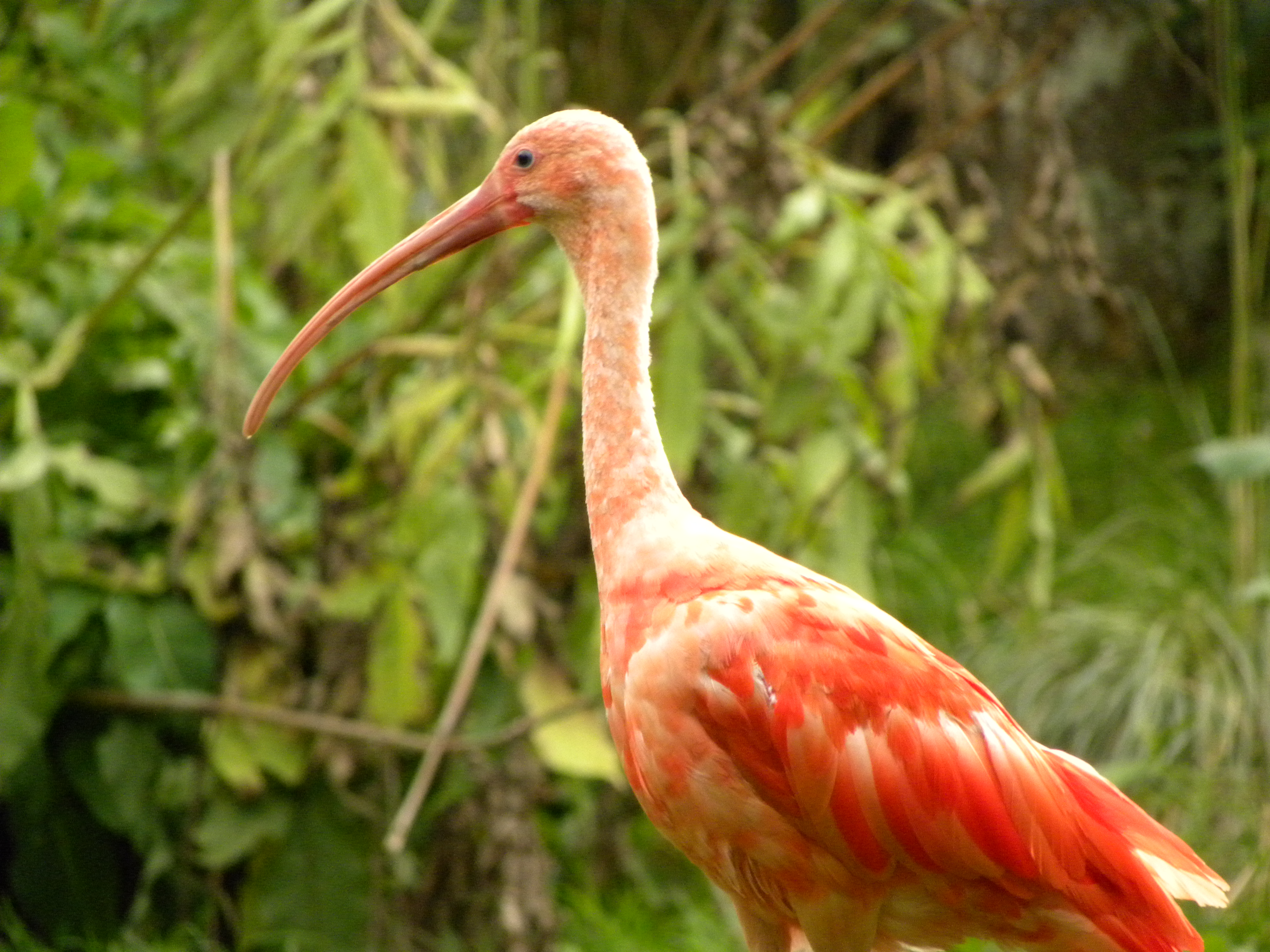
Scarlet ibis

The biodiversity of Suriname is high, mostly because of the variety of habitats and warm temperatures. The average annual temperature in the coastal area is between 26° and 28 °C. Suriname can be divided into four major ecological zones, namely from north to south;

1. The young coastal plain
2. The old coastal plain
3. The Savannah or Zanderij belt
4. The interior residual uplands

== Habitats and species ==
Share of forest area in total land area, top countries (2021). Suriname has the highest percentage of forest cover in the world.

The coast of Suriname is wild and consists of mud banks, sand beaches, mangrove forests and lagoons. The Guiana current flows along the coast of Suriname. The North Brazil Current, a warm water ocean current, is also known as the Guiana current. The confusion surrounding its name is due partly to the seasonal change in flow of nearby currents. The mangrove forests have only one storey, with a height of 20–25 meters. They are almost completely homogeneous and dominated by black mangrove (Avicennia germinans). The mangrove forests are important as staging and wintering areas for birds, such as the scarlet ibis (Eudocimus ruber). However, poaching is a major problem in the coastal area. According to Ottema, a 2006 study reveals that tens of thousands of protected shorebirds and waders are poached annually. The Nature Conservation Division of the Forestry ministry attempts to prevent poaching by employing more forest guards as well as through environmental education. Furthermore, Ottema opined that the large-billed seed finch or twatwa is almost extirpated.

Inland from the mangroves lie salt water and brackish lagoons, surrounded by grass and fern vegetation with low plant species diversity. The orange-winged amazon (parrot), creates nests in the lagoons. Further inland, species rich freshwater and shrub swamps can be found. On the coastal plan, parallel to the shoreline, lie old sand and shell ridges. The savannabelt, a mosaic of diverse landscapes and ecosystems, is located south of the coastal plan. Plants and animals, such as the love-vine (lenkiwisi) (Cassytha filiformis), sundews (Drosera sp.), sabana-fungu (Licaniai acana), tortoises (Chelonodis sp.), snakes, iguanas, deer and the long-nosed or naked-tailed armadillo (Dasypus sp.) grow and live in the savannabelt of Suriname.

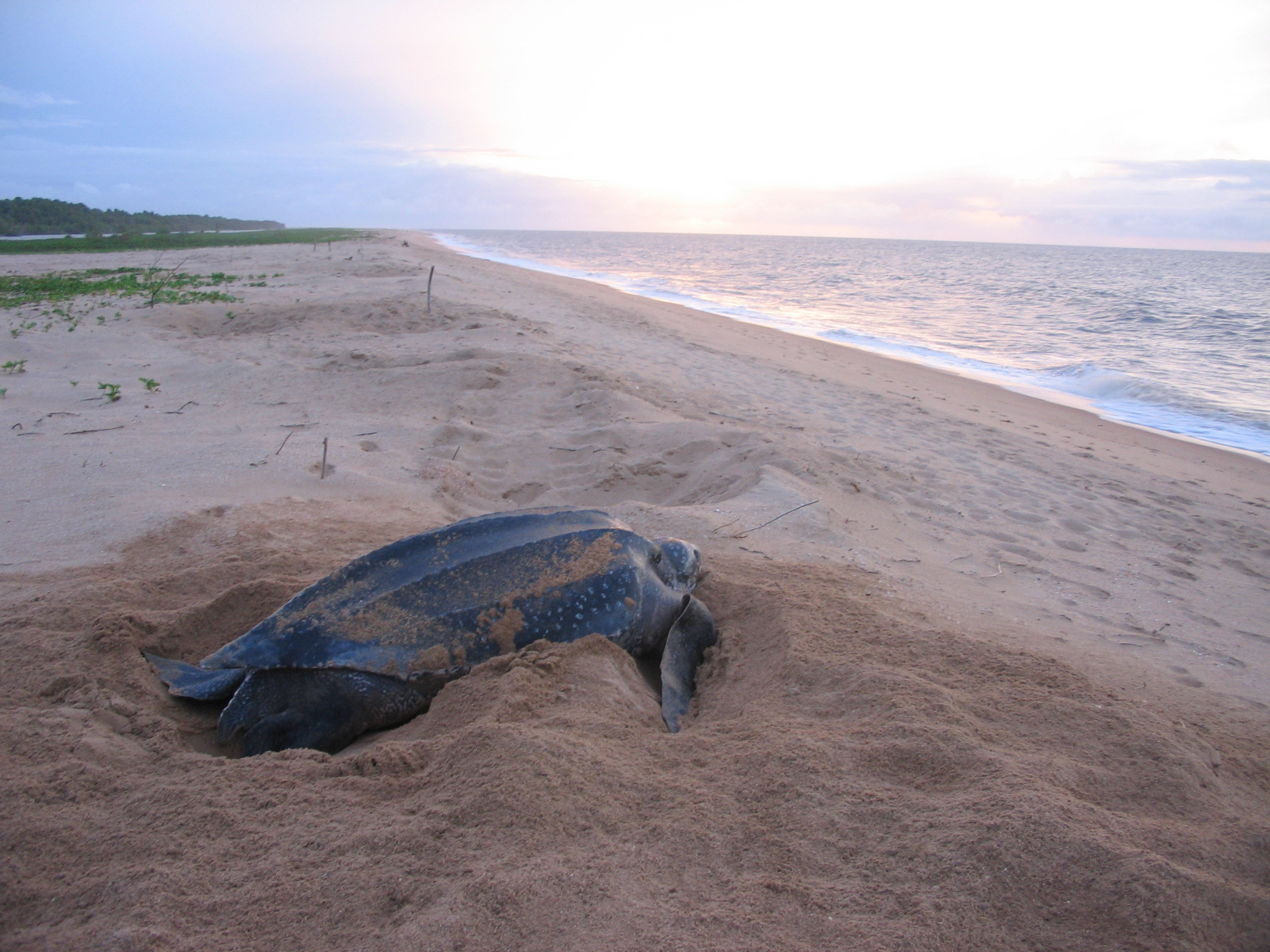
Leatherback turtle

Four species of sea turtles create nests on the beaches. These sea turtles are:

1. Aitkanti or leatherback turtle (Dermochelys corriacea)
2. Krape or green turtle (Chelonia mydas)
3. Warana or olive ridley sea turtle (Lepidochelys olivacea)
4. Karet or hawksbill sea turtle (Eretmochelys imbricata).

Suriname is rich in freshwater resources. Suriname has 228 cubic meters of renewable freshwater resources per capita annually. However, these resources are seriously threatened by human activities, such as gold mining. Suriname has more or less 61 endemic freshwater fishes. According to Jan H. Mol, the Atlantic goliath grouper (Epinephelus itajara) is endangered.

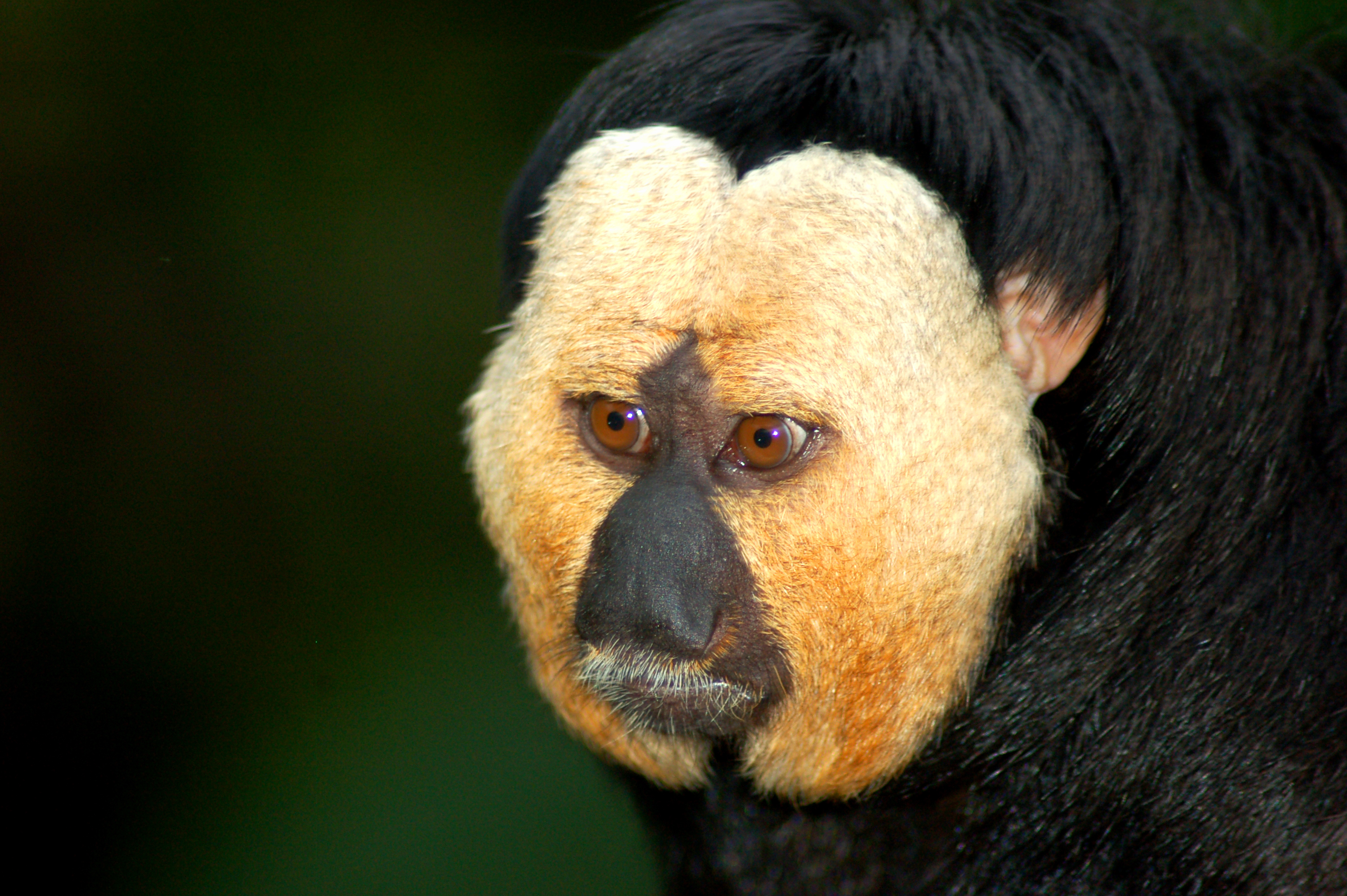
White faced saki

In the highlands, mountains, such as Bakhuys Mountains, Van Asch Van Wijck Mountains, Julianatop, are part of the Guiana Shield. The Guiana Shield is one of the regions of highest biodiversity in the world, and has many endemic species. It can be said that the white-faced saki is endemic to the Guianas. The Guianan piculet (Picumnus minutissimis) is probably endemic to Suriname. It has not been confirmed for neighboring countries.

The rest of Suriname is covered with forests. Most of the forests are undisturbed because of the low human population density of 2.7 people /km. There are still new species discovered in Suriname. In 2012, Conservation International Suriname (CIS) announced that 60 new species were discovered in het Grensgebergte and Kasikasima. Among the newly discovered species were: the chocolate-colored "cocoa" frog and the juvenile planthopper.

== Number of groups of plants and animals in Suriname ==
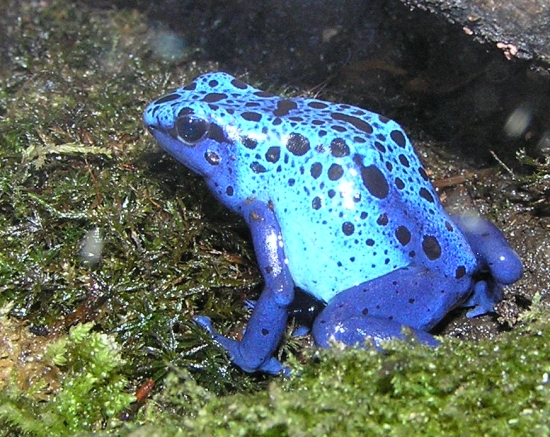
Blue poison dart frog

The table shows the number of the groups of plants and animals which can be found in Suriname in 2009.

Species	Amount
Mammals	192
Birds	715
Reptiles	175
Amphibians	102
Marine fish	360
Freshwater species	318
Plants	more or less 5,100

== Nature Protection Act 1954 and the Game Act 1954 ==
The Nature Protection Act 1954 and the Game Act 1954 are important for the protection of nature in Suriname. The Nature Protection Act 1954 regulates the establishment and the management of nature reserves and other protected areas. The Game Act 1954 states which species of wild life may be hunted and during which period. There are four categories of wild animals, namely protected animals, game species, cage species and predominantly harmful species. The giant anteater, red-faced spider monkey, ocelot, jaguar, bush dog and the Guiana dolphin are some of the mammals that are under complete protection in Suriname.

== Protected areas ==
Suriname has 11 nature reserves, 1 nature park and 4 multi-use management areas (MUMAs). A protected area is an area set aside for the preservation and protection of highly important natural and cultural features, for the regulation of the scientific, educational and recreational use. On March 5, 2015, the leaders of the indigenous peoples in Suriname presented a declaration for the protection of a 7.2 million-hectare preserve, to members of parliament. Conservation International-Suriname and the World Wide Fund For Nature worked to support the vision of the Trio and Wayana communities to map the preserve and lay out strategies to fund and ensure the success of the initiative. The plan includes the provision of jobs for tribe members as rangers and guards. The indigenous leaders also intent to establish the value maintaining the unspoiled rivers.

== Protected areas in hectares in 2010 ==
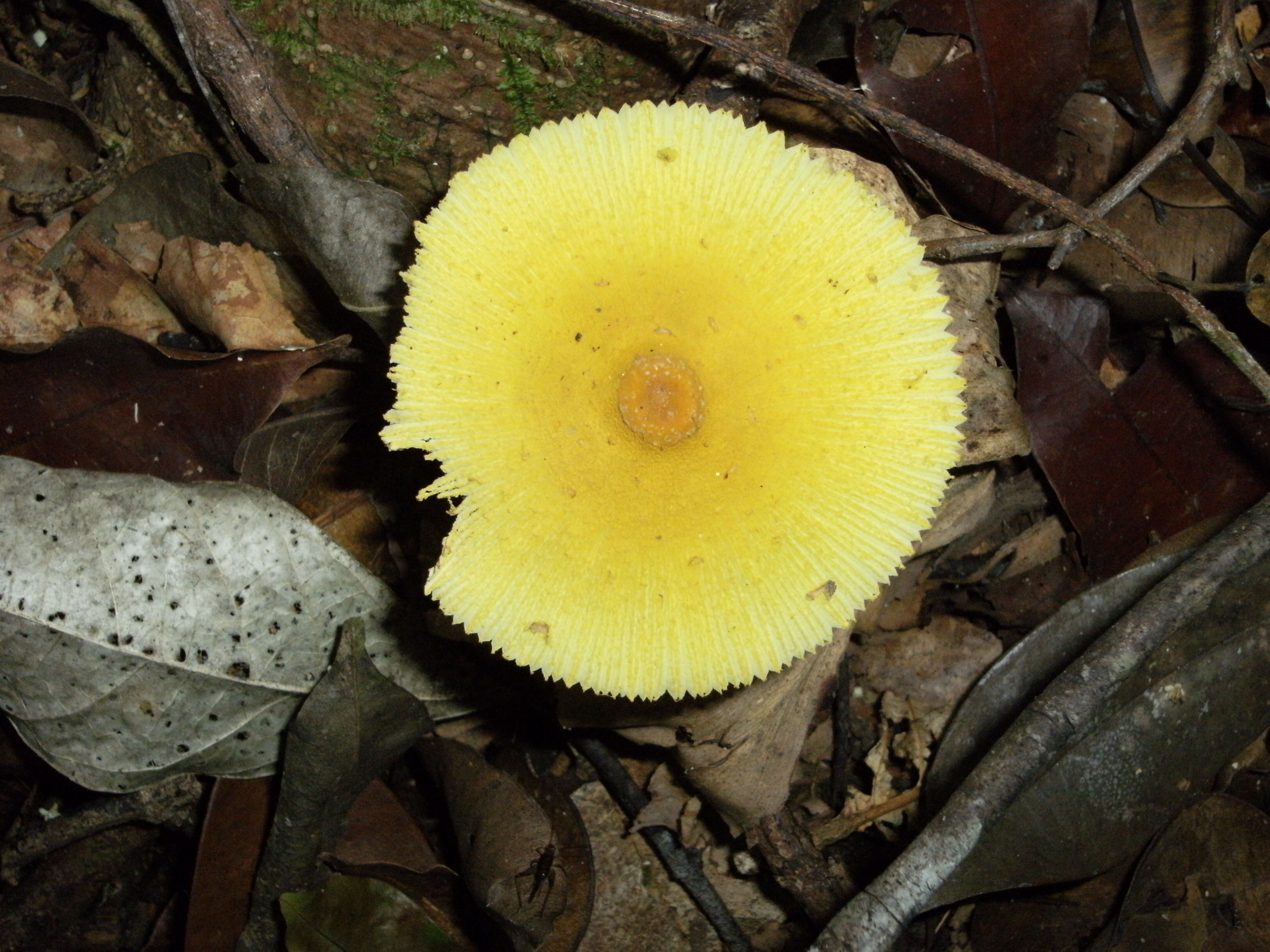
Leucocoprinus birnbaumii at Brownsberg

The table shows the protected areas in Suriname in hectares (ha) in 2010.

Protected areas	Total area (hectares)
Boven Coesewijne	27,000
Brinckheuvel	6,000
Central Suriname Nature Reserve	1,592,000
Copi Nature Reserve	28,000
Coppename monding	12,000
Galibi	4,000
Hertenrits	100
Peruvia	31,000
Sipaliwini Savanna	100,000
Wanekreek	45,000
Wia Wia	36,000
Brownsberg Nature Park	12,200
Bigi Pan	67,900
Noord Coronie	27,200
Noord Saramacca	88,400
Noord Commewijne	61,500
Total	2,138,300

== International conventions ==
Suriname is signatory to many international conventions aimed at protection and conservation of the biodiversity. The most important are the Convention on Biological Diversity, the Convention on International Trade in Endangered Species of Wild Fauna and Flora and the Ramsar Convention on Wetlands. In 2007, the Ministry of the Environment presented the National Biodiversity Strategy and in 2013 the National Biodiversity Action Plan.

== See also ==
- List of birds of Suriname
- List of mammals of Suriname
