= Squatting in Suriname =

Occupation of unused land or derelict buildings without the permission of the owner

Suriname on the globe

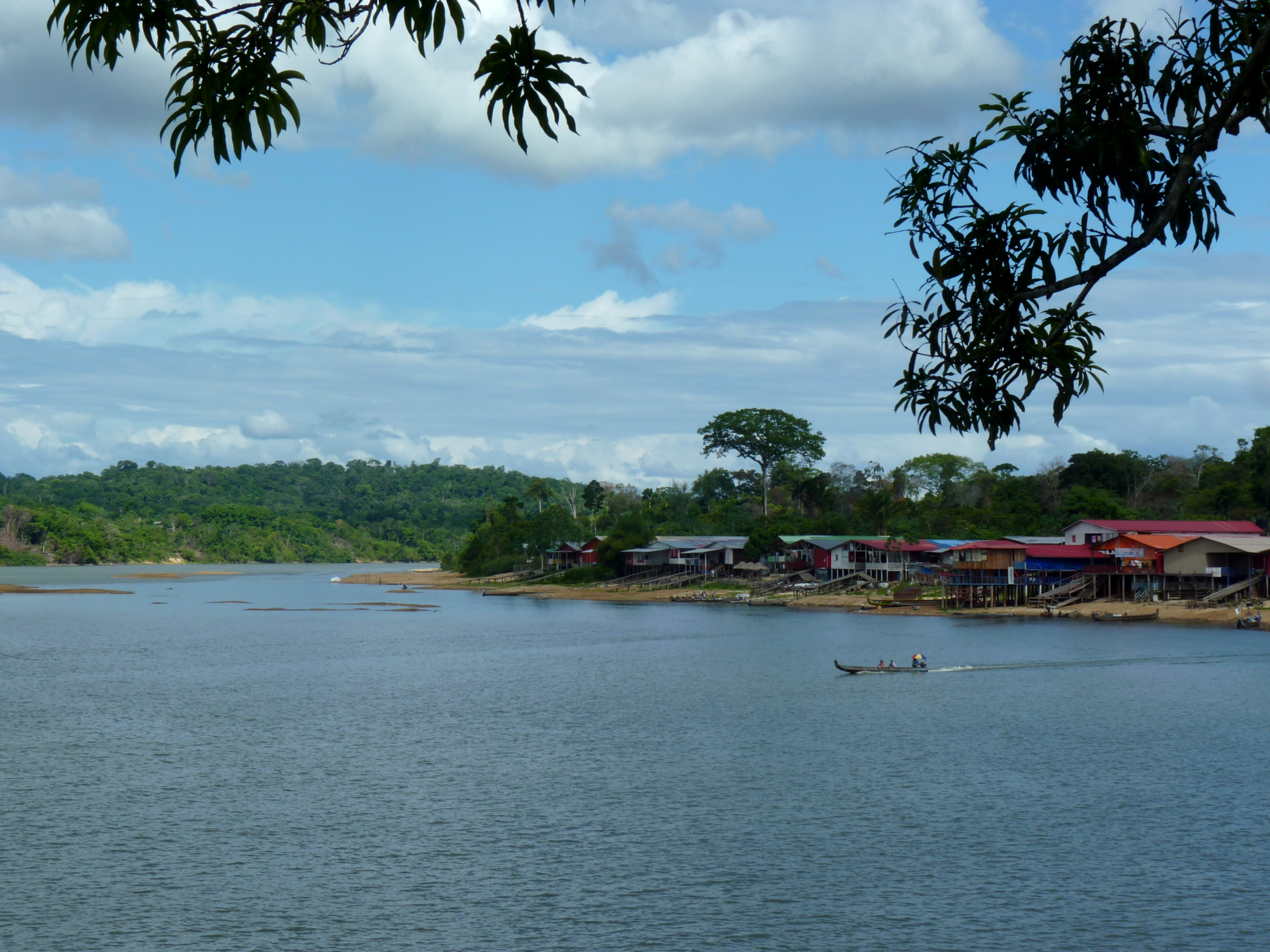
Self-built housing at Antonio do Brinco

Squatting in Suriname is the occupation of unused land or derelict buildings without the permission of the owner. Maroons and indigenous peoples such as Tiriyó Amerindians have squatted buildings and illegal gold prospectors have occupied land.

== History ==
Suriname became an independent republic in 1975, after previously being a Dutch colony. The Dutch had recognised the land rights of the coastal Amerindians since 1686, and land rights of the various maroon groups from 1760 onwards. In 1815, following the ratification of the Convention of London, Suriname became the only Dutch colony in the Guianas.

In the 1990s, squatters occupied government-built housing at Koewarasan and called their occupation Sunny Point. The occupiers were mostly Maroons, who had been displaced by the Surinamese Interior War. The village of Pokigron was destroyed in the conflict and people ended up squatting in a barracks near Paramaribo.

The Tiriyó Amerindians have a habit of squatting abandoned sites. People moved from Kwamalasamutu to Alalapadu in the 1970s, then Alalapadu was re-occupied from 1999 onwards. Derelict colonial-era buildings in Kuruni were also squatted. In Amatopo, houses had been built for an abandoned bauxite mining project. The first two settlers moved into the unused buildings near the airstrip and a pilot chased them away. Asongo Alalaparu, the granman (paramount chief of the tribe), told them to return and build their houses next to the facilities which were already present.

The presence of gold in the interior, has attracted garimpeiros (illegal gold prospectors) who come mainly from Brazil. They have founded Antonio do Brinco and Villa Brazil among others.

== See also ==
- Squatting in Guyana
