= Wanapan =

Wanapan Arapahtë pata
- Location in Suriname
- Coordinates: 4°22′55″N 57°57′28″W
- Country: Suriname
- District: Sipaliwini District
- Resort: Kabalebo
- Settlement: 1998

Government
  - Captain: Djeneninpe Jang

Population (2022)
  - Total: 175

Wanapan or Arapahtë pata is a Tiriyó village in the Sipaliwini District of Suriname. It was established at the bottom of the Wonotobo Falls in 1998 by captain Arapahtë.

== Name ==
Wanapan is the Tiriyó-language name for Clusia plants, which are found abundantly in the area. Arapahtë is the name of the captain of the village.

== History ==
Since the arrival of missionaries to the Surinamese interior in the 1950s, the Tiriyó have increasingly moved to larger population centres close to airfields, such as Alalapadu and Kwamalasamutu. While this facilitated the work of the missionaries and the Surinamese government, it also meant that soils and hunting areas were over-extracted. After Asongo Alalaparu was installed as granman of the Tiriyó in 1997, he motivated his people to disperse again. Wanapan was subsequently founded in 1998 by captain Arapahtë.

Partly as a result of the dispersal of the Tiriyó away from Kwamalasamutu, Tiriyó sub-identities that were thought to have disappeared re-emerged again. Hence, the inhabitants of Wanapan identify themselves as Aramayana or "bee people".

Wanapan lies in a very isolated location in Suriname. The nearest school and clinic are located in Apoera, which lies about one day travelling downstream by motorized canoe. In order to be able to send their children to school, the villagers of Wanapan founded the village of Sandlanding close to Apoera.
