= Lucie, Suriname =

Lucie
- Location in Suriname
- Coordinates: 3°34′48″N 57°41′6″W
- Country: Suriname
- District: Sipaliwini District
- Resort: Kabalebo
- Settlement: 2004

Government
  - Captain: Pepu Ipajari

Population (2007)
  - Total: 18

Lucie is a Tiriyó village at the mouth of the Lucie River in the Sipaliwini District of Suriname. The village was founded in 2004.

Lucie lies about 7 kilometres (4.3 mi) downstream the Courentyne River from the village of Amatopo and its airstrip. Like the inhabitants of Amatopo, the villagers of Lucie earn money selling souvenirs to tourists on Arapahu island. The village was founded, because Kwamalasamutu became overcrowded. As of 2005, the villagers living there are a vanguard for future migration.

The inhabitants of Lucie identify as Okomoyana, a sub-identity of the Tiriyó.

Lucie was flooded during the 2008 rainy season.
