= Sandlanding =

- Location in Suriname
- Coordinates: 5°9′47″N 57°10′12″W
- Country: Suriname
- District: Sipaliwini District
- Resort: Kabalebo

Population (2007)
  - Total: 33

Sandlanding is a Tiriyó village in the Sipaliwini District of Suriname. The village lies just south of Apoera, which is mainly inhabited by Arowaks.

Most of the villagers originally came from Kwamalasamutu who had settled in Wanapan. Sandlanding was founded by Tiriyó families with schoolgoing children from the village of Wanapan, who wanted to live closer to the schools of Apoera. The inhabitants of Sandlanding still fall under the authority of the captain of Wanapan. Sandlanding lies within the customary lands of the Arowak, however, and by agreement between captain Alapate of Wanapan and captain Lewis of Apoera, Sandlanding residents can appeal to the latter for needs.
