= Washabo =

- Location in Suriname
- Coordinates: 5°12′52″N 57°11′14″W
- Country: Suriname
- District: Sipaliwini District
- Resort: Kabalebo

Government
  - Captain: Sergio Srisria

Population (2020)
  - Total: c. 600

Washabo is a town in Suriname, located in the Kabalebo resort of Sipaliwini district. The town lies on a bend in the Corantijn river (Courantyne), on the border with Guyana. Washabo is an Indigenous village of the Lokono tribe near Apoera. It has a population of about 600 people. According to the oral tradition, the village was founded in the 1920s by the Lingaard family.

The village generally does not allow non-tribal people to live in their village unless they are married to a member of the tribe. Washabo has a clinic and a school. Washabo can be reached from an unpaved road from the Southern East-West Link. The Washabo Airport is located in the village. Up to 1995, the villages of Apoera, Washabo and Section were governed by the same village chief due to their close proximity.

== See also ==
- Corantijn Basin
