= Coeroeni =

- Resort
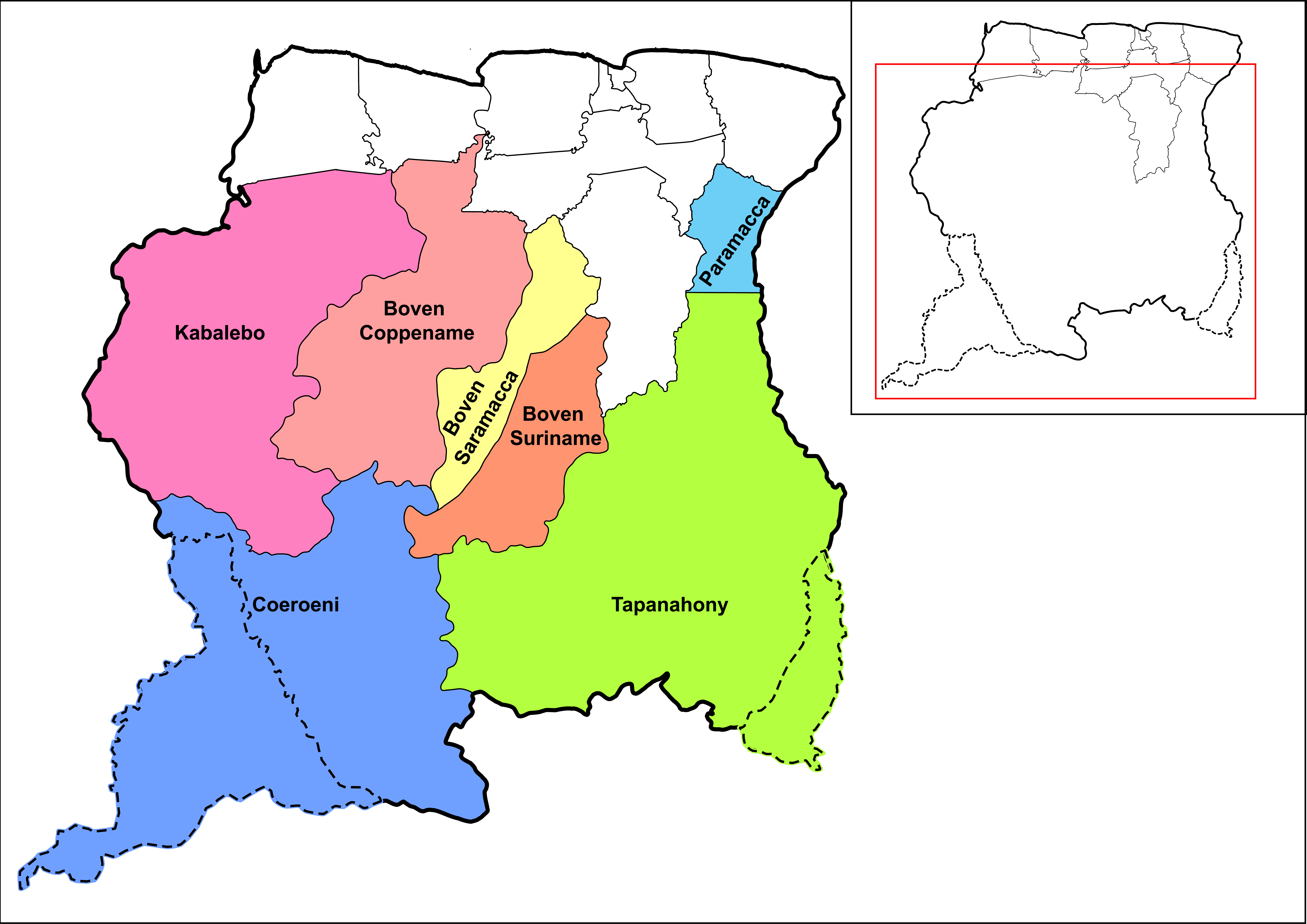
- Map showing the resorts of Sipaliwini District. Coeroeni
- Country: Suriname
- District: Sipaliwini District

Area
  - Total: 33,133 km^{2} (12,793 sq mi)

Population (2012)
  - Total: 1,046
  - Density: 0.03157/km^{2} (0.08177/sq mi)
- Time zone: UTC-3 (AST)

Coeroeni is a resort in Suriname, located in the Sipaliwini District. Its population at the 2012 census was 1,046. The resort is mainly inhabited by indigenous people of the Tiriyó tribe. Kwamalasamutu is the main village of the resort and home to the granman (paramount chief) Asongo Alalaparu.

The resort was created in 1983 out of Nickerie as a tribal area. The disputed area of south-west Suriname known as Tigri Area belongs to the Coeroeni resort.

== Villages ==
- Alalapadu
- Amatopo
- Kasuela (disputed)
- Kuruni
- Kwamalasamutu
- Sakuru (disputed)
- Sipaliwini Savanna
- Vier Gebroeders

The resort is also home to villages which are only inhabited part of the time.

=== Kamani ===
Kamani is a border village. It was founded in 2008 by people from Kwamalasamutu. The population as of 2009 was 6 people. The location is 2°34′5″N 57°0′30″W.

== Nature ==
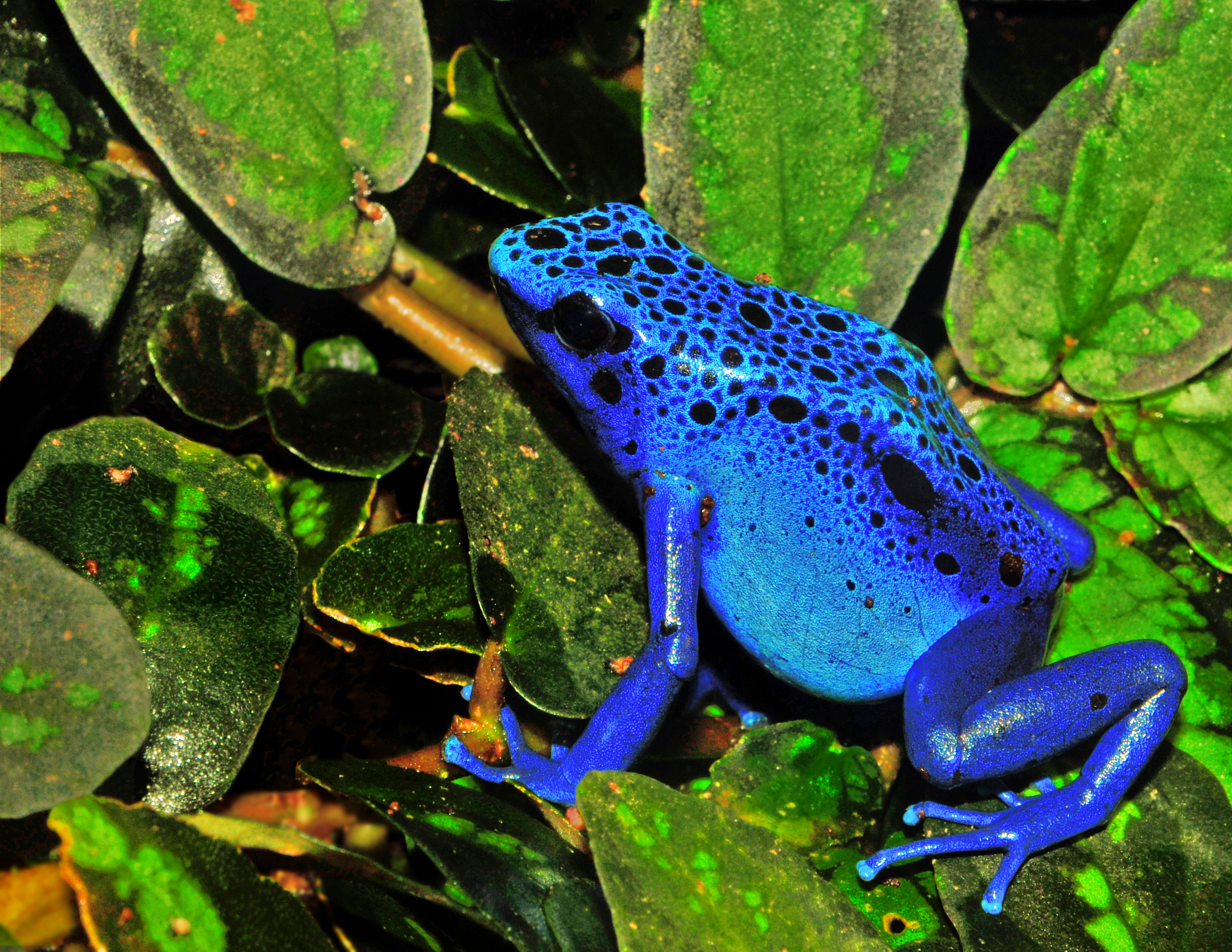
Blue poison dart frog

The Sipaliwini Savanna is a 100,000 hectare nature reserve. It has been a protected area since 1972. The majority of the reserve consists of a savannah which in turn is a continuation of the Brazilian Tumucumaque Mountains National Park. The reserve is in pristine condition with almost no human habitation. This reserve is one of the last frontiers in the tropics, however relatively little is known about the region. The savannah is where the blue poison dart frog was discovered in 1969.

== Archaeology ==
The Werehpai archaeological site, which consists of caves containing petroglyphs of pre-Columbian origin, is located about 10 kilometres from Kwamalasamutu. On the Sipaliwini Savanna relics were discovered of human habitation dating from about 6000 BC.
