= List of protected areas of Suriname =

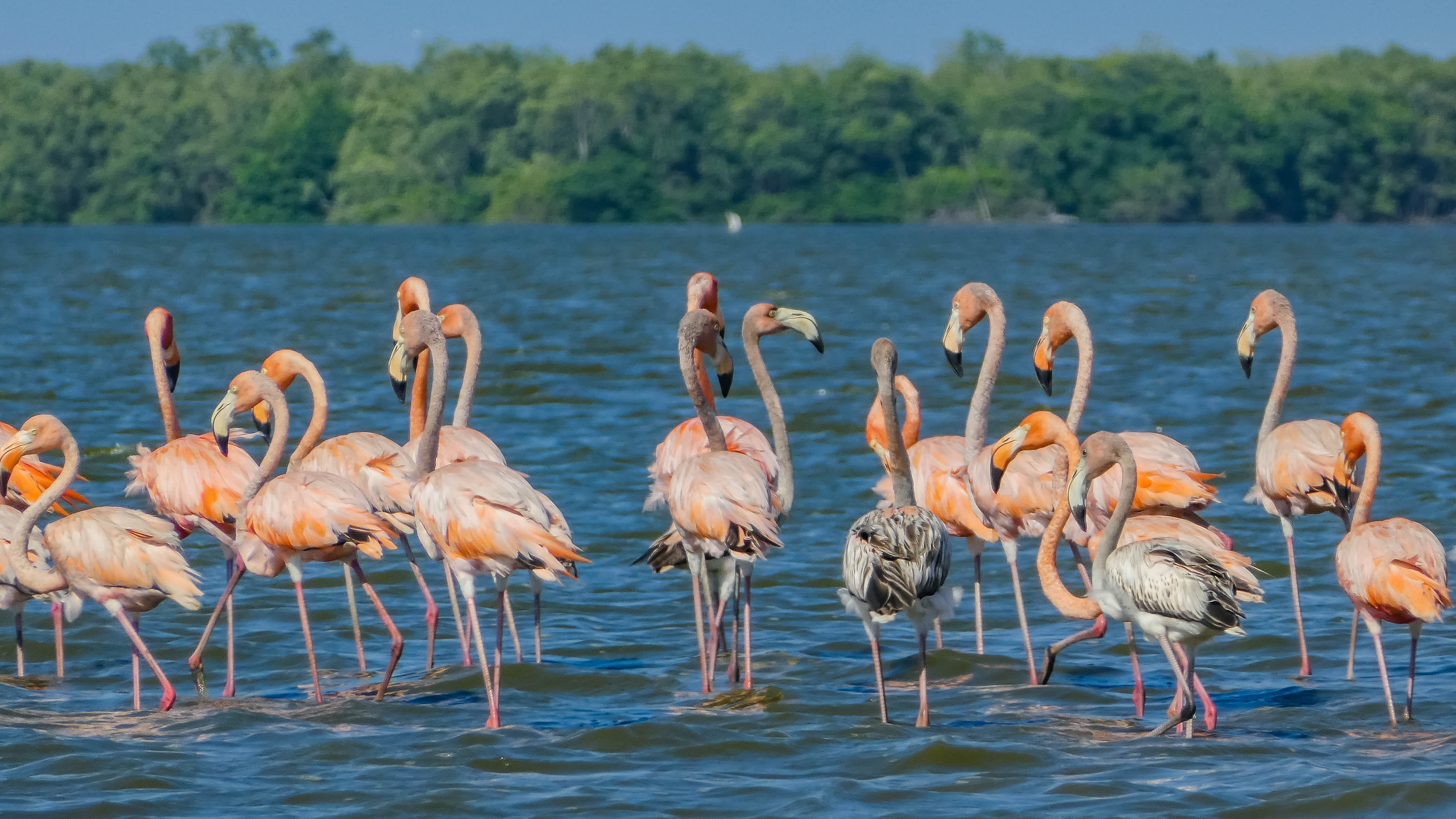
Flamingos in Bigi Pan

There are several protected areas of Suriname. The largest of these is the Central Suriname Nature Reserve, a UNESCO World Heritage Site. The protected areas are managed by the Suriname Forest Service. The Forest Service has appointed STINASU (Stichting Natuurbehoud Suriname), a non-profit foundation, to develop and conduct the educational and tourist aspects in the protected areas. As of 2020, 14.5% of the land territory is protected, and contains one nature park, and 13 nature reserves.

== Nature reserves ==
- Brinckheuvel. Established 1961. 60 square kilometres.
- Coppename. Established 1961. 120 square kilometres.
- Wia Wia Nature Reserve. Established 1966. 360 square kilometres.
- Galibi Nature Reserve. Established 1969. 40 square kilometres.
- Sipaliwini Savanna. Established 1972. 1000 square kilometres
- Boven Coesewijne. Established 1986. 270 square kilometres.
- Peruvia. Established 1986. 310 square kilometres.
- Wanekreek Nature Reserve. Established 1986. 450 square kilometres.
- Copi Nature Reserve. Established 1986. 180 square kilometres.
- Central. Established 1998. 16000 square kilometres.

== Nature Park ==
- Brownsberg Nature Park. Established 1969. 122 square kilometres

== Special management areas ==
- Bigi Pan. Established 1987. 679 square kilometers.
- Noord Coronie. Established 2001. 150 square kilometers.
- Noord Saramacca. Established 2001. 830 square kilometers.
- Noord Commewijne. Established 2002. 650 square kilometers. Braamspunt became part of the management area in 2015.

== Protected areas ==
- Hertenrits. Archaeological site. Established 1972. 1 square kilometres.
- Werehpai and Iwana Samu Protected Area. Petroglyphs. Established 2007. 180 square kilometers
- Peperpot. Plantation. Established 2009. 700 hectares.
