= Copi (disambiguation) =

Copi is the pen name of Raúl Damonte Botana, an Argentine writer.

COPI is a coatomer, a type of protein complex.

Copi or COPI may also refer to:

== People ==
- Irving Copi (1917–2002), an American philosopher
- Tomaž Čopi (1970), a Slovenian sailor
- Živa Čopi (1988), a Slovenian handball player

== Other uses ==
- Copi, an alternative name for certain species of Asian carp: See Asian carp § Copi renaming
- Copi Nature Reserve, a nature reserve and indigenous village in Suriname
- Copi Project, a rare-earths mining project in Australia
