= Sipaliwini Savanna =

Protected area in Suriname

- IUCN category IV (habitat/species management area)
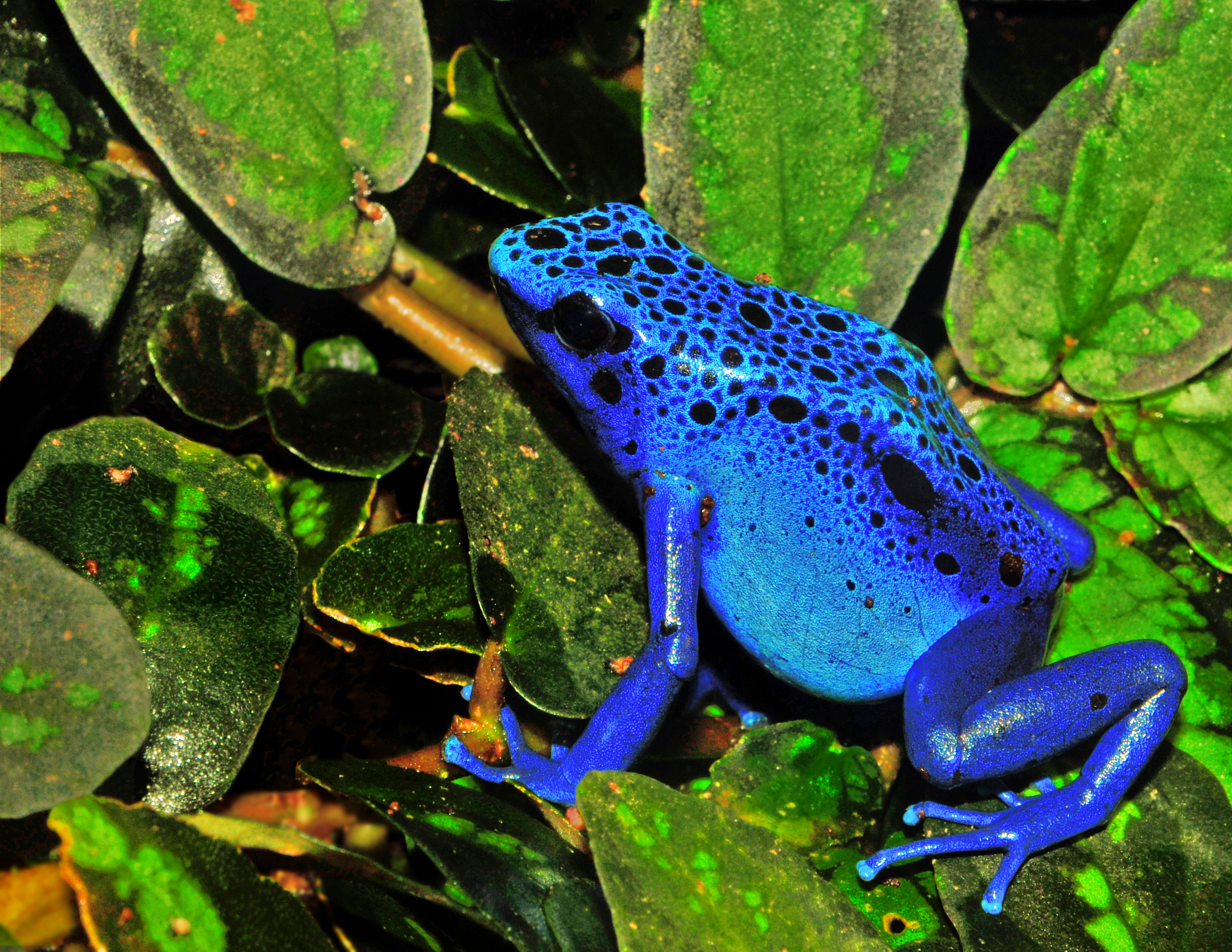
- The blue poison dart frog, discovered in 1969, is endemic to the Sipaliwini Savanna.

- Location within Suriname
- Location: Coeroeni, Sipaliwini District, Suriname
- Nearest city: Sipaliwini Savanna
- Coordinates: 1.9603°N 56.2665°W
- Area: 1,000 km^{2} (390 sq mi)
- Established: 1972

The Sipaliwini Savanna is a protected area and nature reserve in Suriname. The reserve is located to the south of the Sipaliwini River in the far south of the country. The reserve measures 100,000 hectares, and has been a protected area since 1972. The majority of the reserve consists of a savannah which in turn is a continuation of the Brazilian Tumucumaque Mountains National Park. The reserve is in pristine condition with almost no human habitation.

== History ==
The area was first explored in October 1935 by A.J.H. van Lynden who was surprised to discover an immense savannah behind the dense rain forests. In 1962, a study was started whether the savannah could be used for animal husbandry, however the transport costs via airplane would make the enterprise unprofitable. A detailed study into the plant and animal life commenced in 1968.

This reserve is one of the last frontiers in the tropics, and relatively little is known about the region.

== Overview ==
The savannah consists of large grasslands with wetter islands of trees. Bird life is abundant, and the savannah is where the blue poison dart frog was discovered in 1969. In 2005, six birds that had never been recorded in Suriname were seen on the reserve. It includes a new species of sun parakeet, and a new rufous-sided scrub tyrant. The savannah is home to the harpy eagle and the jaguar.

== Accessibility ==
The Sipaliwini Savanna is very hard to reach. The Sipaliwini Airstrip is accessible by small planes. From the airstrip, it takes another 2 to 3 hours to reach the reserve along trails, or a canoe journey along the Sipaliwini River. Permission to enter the territory has to be obtained from the granman (tribal leader) who resides at Kwamalasamutu.

== Threats ==
The reserve is not guarded. Poaching, and collecting of endangered species are a problem. Burning of the savannah by the Amerindians is also a problem.

== Bibliography ==
- Ouboter, Paul E. (2001). "Directory of protected areas of Suriname". IBER.
