= Squatting in Guyana =

Occupation of unused land or derelict buildings without the permission of the owner

Guyana on the globe

Squatting in Guyana is the occupation of unused land or derelict buildings without the permission of the owner. Squatting has been used as a means to find housing by people displaced by conflict in the 1960s and by internal migrants from the 1980s onwards. In 2015, there were estimated to be over 100,000 squatters across the country. The government announced the National Squatter Regularisation Commission (NSRC) and the State Land Resettlement Commission in 2020, in the following year it allied with UN-Habitat to create the Guyana Strategy for Informal Settlements Upgrading and Prevention (GSISUP) which aims to regularize all informal settlements by 2030.

== History ==
Conflict in Guyana in the 1960s led to people squatting in racially demarcated informal settlements. When the government ceased to provide housing in the 1980s, people started squatting again, mostly around Georgetown. At the Met-en-Meerzorg settlement, four-room houses were constructed with walls made from zinc or wood. As of 1997, there was no running water and there had been electricity since 1994. Plastic City at Vreed en Hoop was occupied in the early 1990s with people living in wooden houses next to the ocean.

A study by the Land Tenure Centre of the University of Wisconsin published in 2001 stated that knowing exactly how much squatting was happening was difficult because of the varied ways in which people illegally accessed land, such as exploitation of administrative loopholes, staying on land after leases had ended, incrementally taking more land than was originally owned, as well as the conventional form of occupying unused property. Land invasions were most frequent on former co-operative farms or beside railways and reserves.

Since the late 2000s, the Ministry of Public Works has been planning to expand the Cheddi Jagan International Airport and therefore wanted to relocate squatters. By 2015, squatters were still being cleared. That year it was estimated that 27,570 families (over 100,000) people were squatting across the country.

From 2019 onwards, the issue of people squatting sugar plantations in the Essequibo Islands-West Demerara region became a controversial issue. In the same area there were also squatters on the Herstelling sea dam.

== Regularization plans ==
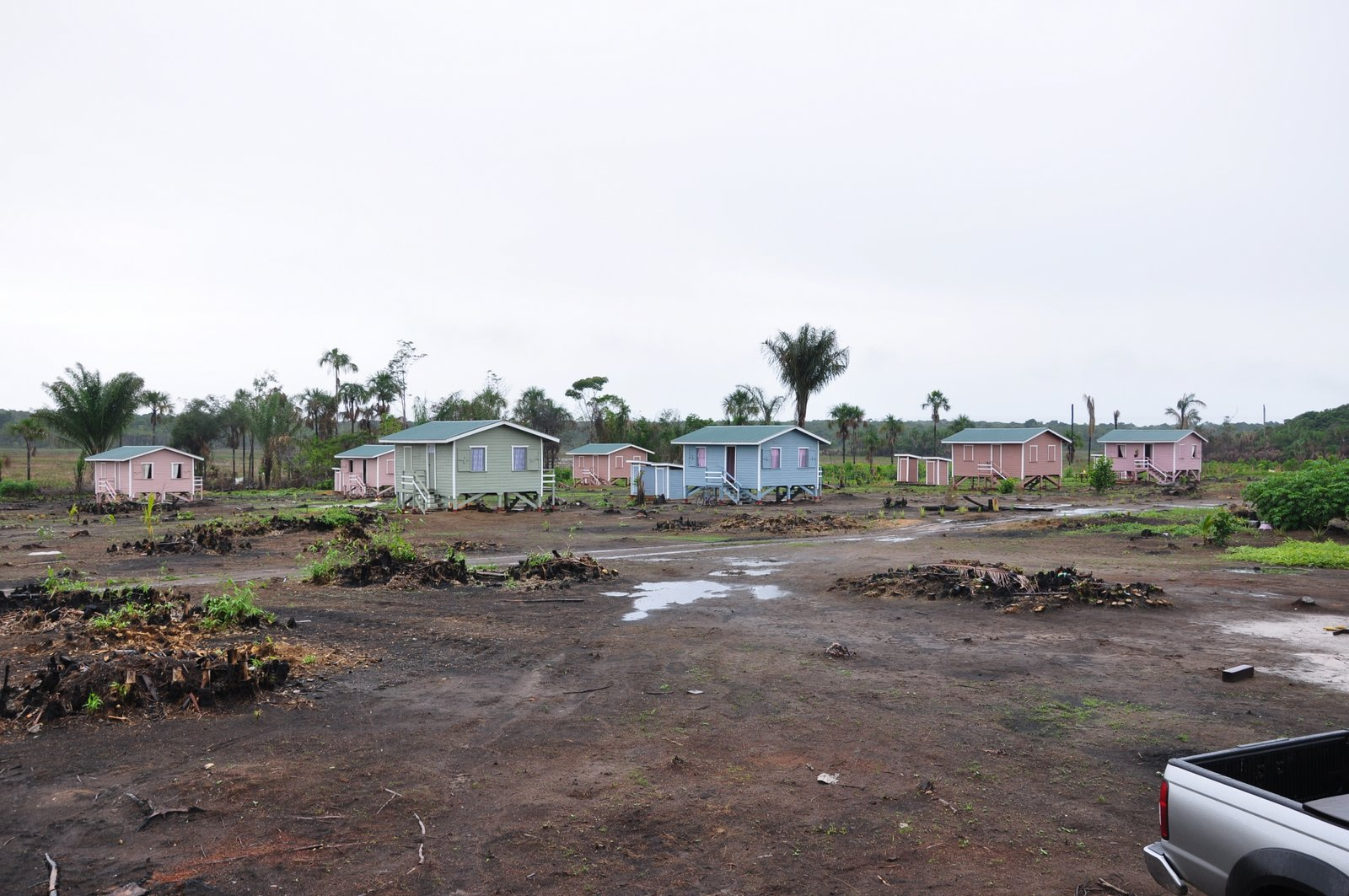
Little Red Village near Lake Tapakuma. Little Red Village is a reallocation project for people living in shanty towns.

The Ministry of Housing and Water said in 2005 that it would regularize 165 squatted settlements by the following year. Between 2015 and 2020, the country was ruled by a coalition of A Partnership for National Unity (APNU) and Alliance for Change (AFC). The Guyana Times then accused the Guyana Lands and Surveys Commission of giving land to APNU and AFC members.

President David A. Granger announced in 2020 that the government would set up a National Squatter Regularisation Commission (NSRC) and a State Land Resettlement Commission. He said there were 178 informal settlements when his party came to power and he wanted to legalize them all. Residents of Plastic City welcomed the initiative. The following year the government announced it was teaming up with UN-Habitat to make the Guyana Strategy for Informal Settlements Upgrading and Prevention (GSISUP), which plans to regularize all squatted areas by 2030.

== See also ==
- Squatting in Suriname
