= Coesewijne River =

River in Suriname

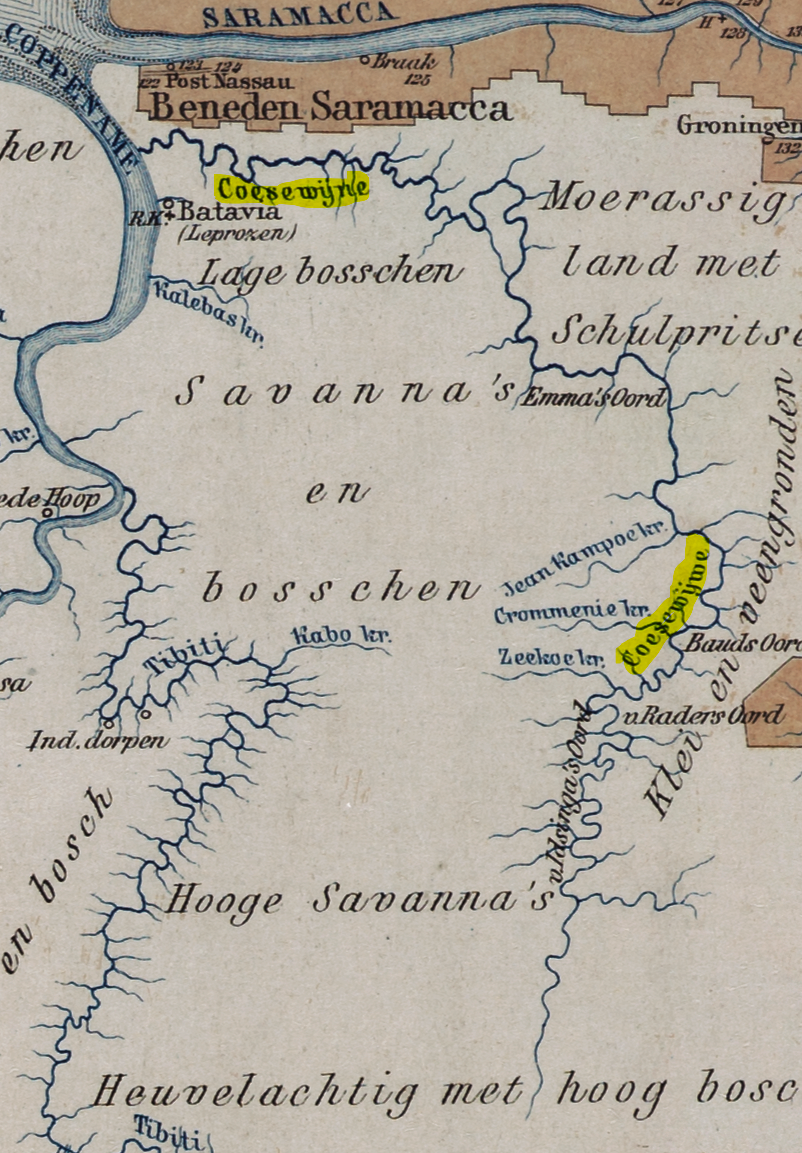

- Location within Suriname

Location
- Country: Suriname
- District: Saramacca and Para

Physical characteristics
- Source
  - location: Goliath Mountain
  - coordinates: 5.3064°N 55.5403°W
- Mouth: Coppename River
  - coordinates: 5.7573°N 55.8852°W

Basin features
- Progression: Coppename River→Atlantic Ocean

The Coesewijne River is a blackwater river in Suriname. It is a tributary of the Coppename River and flows into the Coppename south of Boskamp. The river has its source in the Goliath Mountain.

== Overview ==
The northern part of the river flows through an agricultural area. Further south, the Coesewijne flows through marshes, seasonally flooded grassland, and swamp forests. The Coesewijne is a meandering river which twists and turns through the landscape.

The Coesewijne is a popular fishing river. During the dry season the creeks and swamps in the area start to dry up, resulting in an abundance of fish in the river.

The river is home to a large population of caimans, giant otters and manatees. The upper course of the river has been protected as the Boven Coesewijne Nature Reserve since 1986.
