= Apoera =

Apoera Apura West Suriname
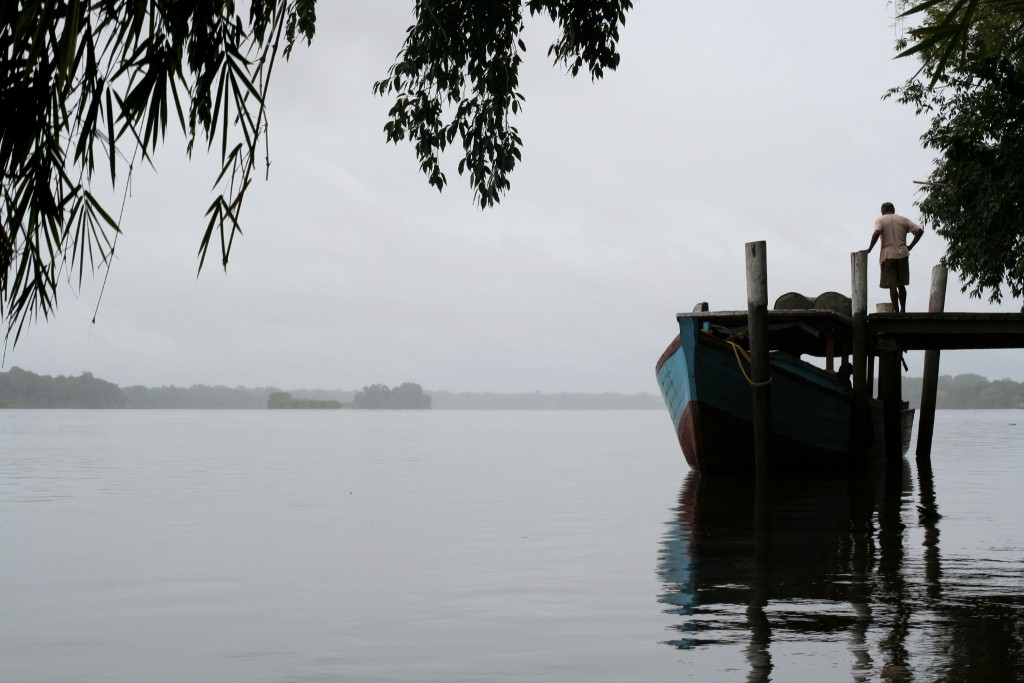
- The river at Apoera

- Location in Suriname
- Coordinates: 5°11′2″N 57°9′57″W
- Country: Suriname
- District: Sipaliwini District
- Resort: Kabalebo

Population (2020)
  - Total: 777

Apoera, also Apura, is a town in western Suriname. The village has a population of 777 people as of 2020. It owns the community of Tropica. It is the final destination of the Southern East-West Link. 24 kilometres (15 mi) north-west on the other side of the Courantyne River lies the Guyanese village of Orealla. The village is home to the Lokono tribe, but has been westernized. Due to the influx of people of Guyana, the languages used are English, and Sranan Tongo. Dutch is rarely spoken and the native language has all but disappeared. According to the oral tradition, Apoera was founded around 1920 by the Gordon family.

== Geography ==
Apoera is part of the Kabalebo resort in the Sipaliwini District of Suriname. This town is situated on the Surinamese (Eastern) Bank of the river Corantijn and has about 777 inhabitants, originally mainly Ameridians of the Lokono tribe. Apoera, apart from over the river, is also accessible via the road link Zanderij-Bitagron-Camp 52 (the southern east–west link). It is located about 24 km from the Guyanese village of Orealla. The town of Apoera is situated in the close vicinity of the Amerindian Village Washabo, the Tiriyó village of Sandlanding, and the Washabo Airstrip. Up to 1995, the villages of Apoera, Washabo and Section were governed by the same chieftain due to their close vicinity.

== Healthcare ==
Apoera is home to a Medische Zending healthcare centre.

== Economic development ==
In the framework of the West-Suriname plan from 1976 to 1978 an 80 kilometer long railway was built from the south of Apoera to the Bakhuis mountain range, for bauxite mining. It was intended that Apoera would be developed into a port where bauxite ships could dock, but in the end the railroad was never used for this purpose. According to this West Suriname Plan, Apoera would be transformed into a prosperous harbor city transporting bauxite coming from the Bakhuis Mountains to the ships in the harbor. The plan never came to fruition and the 63 prefab houses for the workmen had been abandoned and often squatted. In 2003, twelve houses were sold to the inhabitants.

In the framework of the IIRSA project on the upgrading of the road between Ciudad Guayana, San Martín de Turumbán, Linden, Apoera and Paramaribo, a bridge spanning the Courantyne River is planned near Apoera. According to a study by Pitou van Dijk, the Linden-Paramaribo section has only secondary priority with IIRSA at the moment.

There was timber extraction taking place at Apoera including at the business complex of the sawmill of the Greenheart Group, but Greenheart closed the sawmill in 2015.

Apoera has some lodges where tourists can stay during trips through the rain forest. The Surinamese writer Clark Accord wrote the novel "Between Apoera and Oreala" which was published in 2005.
