= Werehpai =

Archaeological site in Suriname

- location in Suriname
- 2°22′51″N 56°40′56″W
- Type: Petroglyphs
- Periods: pre-Columbian era
- Cultures: Amerindian
- Location: Near Kwamalasamutu
- Region: Sipaliwini District

Site notes
- Excavation dates: 2007
- Archaeologists: Aad Versteeg, Abelardo Sandoval
- Public access: Yes

Werehpai is an archaeological site in Suriname consisting of several caves containing petroglyphs of pre-Columbian origin. The site is located about 10 kilometres (6.2 mi) from the village of Kwamalasamutu. With 313 identified petroglyphs, Werehpai is by far the largest pre-Columbian petroglyph site known in Suriname, and perhaps the largest in all of the Guianas.

== Name ==
The site was named by the local Tiriyó after an ancestral female hero. The archaeologists who researched the site in 2007 decided to keep the name.

== Discovery and preliminary research ==
It is disputed who actually discovered the site. Initially, most media reported that the site was discovered in 1998 by a Tiriyó man named Kamainja, who had lost his dog somewhere in the area. As the story goes, Kamainja then reported the discovery to the chief at Kwamalasamutu, Asongo Alalaparu, who spread news of the discovery further. In 2011, however, Surinamese newspaper de Ware Tijd reported that a Tiriyó man by the name of Mennio Moeshè had already discovered the site around 1990, when he was 27 years old. When Kamainja lost his dog, Mennio Moeshè told him about the existence of the caves with petroglyphs, and that he believed that the caves were inhabited by tigers, who could have eaten Kamainja's dog. Kamainja then convinced Mennio Moeshè to show him the location.

What is certain is that chief Asongo in 2000 mentioned the existence of the site to representatives of Conservation International Suriname. With the assistance of Stichting Surinaams Museum, Conservation International subsequently set up a research project to investigate the site. Archaeologists Aad Versteeg of the Stichting Surinaams Museum and Abelardo Sandoval of the Smithsonian Institution conducted field research at Werehpai in 2007, together with soil specialist Dirk Noordam.

In tests pits that were dug, pottery and charcoal fragments were found. Radiocarbon dating on three charcoal fragments resulted in datings between 5,000 and 4,200 years BP.

== Tourism / Iwana Samu ==
Even though the site was discovered only relatively recently, tour operators in Suriname have already begun offering tours to the caves.

The Inter-American Development Bank funded a tourism lodge at Iwana Samu. The Iwana Samu lodge was created to generate funds for effective management of the Werehpai protected area. The caves are 45 minute boat journey from the lodge.

== See also ==
- Corantijn Basin
