= Asongo Alalaparu =

Surinamese traditional leader

- Ashongo Alalaparoe
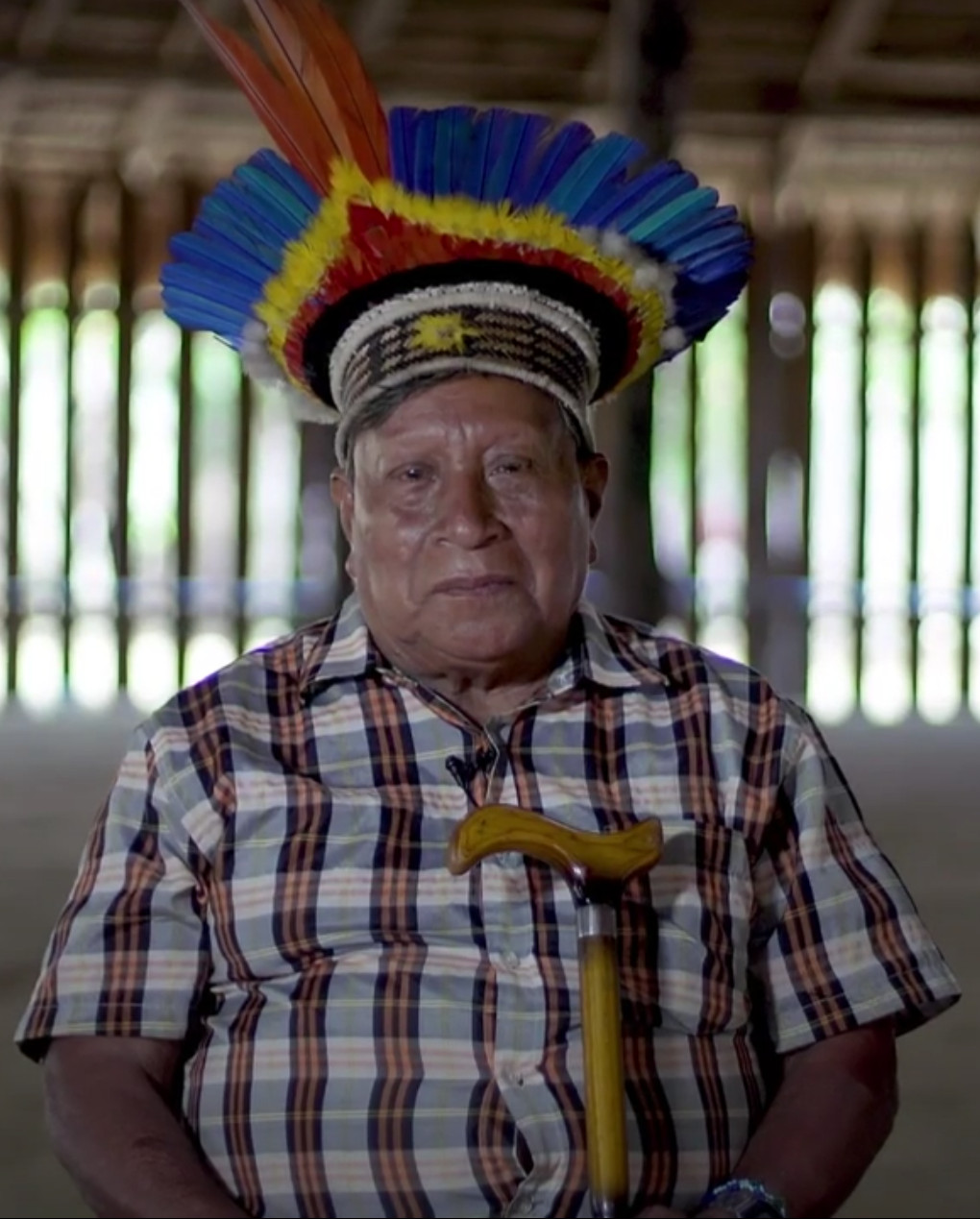
- Alalaparu in 2020

Granman of the Tiriyó in Suriname
- In office 15 January 1997 – 18 September 2021
- Preceded by: Office established
- Succeeded by: Jimmy Toeroemang

Personal details
- Born: 1941-42 Surinam
- Died: 21 November 2021 (aged 79) Lelydorp, Suriname

Asongo Alalaparu, also Ashongo Alalaparoe (1941–42 – 21 November 2021), was a Granman (paramount leader) of the indigenous Tiriyó people in Suriname.

He led the Tiriyó from 1997 to 2021 from his residence in Kwamalasamutu. During his rule, the Tiriyó established new small villages in the interior of Suriname.

== Biography ==
Alalaparu was born in 1941 or 42 as a member of the Tiriyó tribe. This tribe lived in the border area of Suriname and Brazil, and had been contacted in the early 20th century. In 1959, airfields were built in the interior of Suriname as part of Operation Grasshopper. In that same year, the Door-to-Life Gospel Mission was given permission to work among the Tiriyó. In 1961, American missionaries convinced the Tiriyó tribe to abandon their small villages, and settle in one big modern village.

The Tiriyó tribe did not have a clear hierarchy; therefore, President Wijdenbosch appointed Alalaparu as Granman of the tribe on 15 January 1997, and installed Captains to serve as village chiefs.

The main problems facing the tribe are food shortages, the activities of garimpeiros (illegal gold miners), and logging companies. In order to prevent soil depletion as well as defend tribal land against gold miners and tourist lodges, Granman Alalaparu encouraged the founding of new villages in the interior. Villages which were established during this period include Alalapadu, Sipaliwini Savanna, Vier Gebroeders, Kuruni, Amotopo and Wanapan.

At a 2005 meeting with the Organization of American States, Alalaparu expressed his desire to connect the villages with footpaths and link up to the Guyanese border. He also emphasized the potential danger of Kwamalasamutu and Pelelu Tepu, the two major villages on the Surinamese side, becoming divided by land not under tribal ownership. In 2012, Alalaparu protested against plans to build hydroelectric dams on the Tapanahony River near tribal villages.

In 2015, President Bouterse awarded Alalaparu the Grand Cordon of the Honorary Order of the Yellow Star. After Alalaparu's repeated requests to the government, Kwamalasamutu received a tap water system ahead of the 2020 elections. He also promoted the planting of highland rice to increase food self-sufficiency.

On 15 June 2017, Alalaparu named his grandson Jimmy Toeroemang as successor, due to Alalaparu's health. On 18 September 2021, Alalaparu formally handed over his granmanship to Toeroemang. As family members are not usually considered successors in Tiriyó tradition, Alalaparu obtained the assent from a large part of the community beforehand.

Alalaparu died on 21 November 2021, in Regional Hospital Wanica, from COVID-19-related complications.
