= Vier Gebroeders =

Vier Gebroeders Mamija
- Village
- Location in Suriname
- Coordinates: 1.9625°N 55.929722°W
- Country: Suriname
- District: Sipaliwini
- Resort: Coeroeni
- Elevation: 335 m (1,099 ft)

Vier Gebroeders (English: Four Brothers) or Mamija is a Tiriyó village in the Coeroeni resort of the Sipaliwini District of Suriname. Vier Gebroeders is close to the Brazilian border. The village is not named after four brothers, but after the Vier Gebroeders Mountain (560 metres) with four peaks.

In October 1935, the area was first explored by A.J.H. van Lynden. Vier Gebroeders does not have a school or a clinic.

In 2009, a contract was signed with the Dalian company, to construct a road from Pokigron to Brazil via Vier Gebroeders, however the project has not started as of May 2020.

== Airstrip ==
Vier Gebroeders is served by the Vier Gebroeders Airstrip. The airstrip was built as a private airstrip for a cattle farm founded by the American entrepreneur Curtis O. Meyers. Meyers gained permission from the Surinamese government to found a cattle farm in the Sipaliwini Savanna in 1967. Although cattle were indeed imported, the premature death of Meyers in an accident meant that the cattle farm never started in earnest. During an expedition to the Sipaliwini savanna in 1969, two employees of the Geologisch Mijnbouwkundige Dienst and Dienst 's Lands Bosbeheer stayed at the abandoned farm and indeed encountered cattle.
