= Kuruni =

Kuruni Coeroeni
- Village
- Location in Suriname
- Coordinates: 3.3700°N 57.3445°W
- Country: Suriname
- District: Sipaliwini District
- Resort: Coeroeni

Government
  - Captain: Toehanpe Akunpashi

Population (2022)
  - Total: 88

Kuruni (also: Curuni and Coeroeni) is a village in the Coeroeni resort in the Sipaliwini District of Suriname. The village is inhabited by Indigenous people of the Tiriyó tribe. The inhabitants are of the subgroup Aramayana or the Bee people.

== Overview ==
The population as of 2022 is 88 people. There is no school in the village. In 2007, a medical clinic was opened in Kuruni, and is being managed by rotating nurses from Kwamalasamutu. As of November 2019, the villages has 24 hours of electricity using solar panels.

== History ==
In 1959, the Coeroenie Airstrip was constructed to access the interior, and to map mineral resources. In 1965, a camp was constructed near the airstrip to house workers for a planned weir. The village was not intended for permanent habitation. On 12 December 1967, four armed men of the Guyana police force landed and told the workers to leave Camp Oronoque which marked the beginning of the Tigri conflict. Kuruni became a military outpost of the Surinamese army near the border, but was disbanded again in 1968. In 1995, a small group of people from Kwamalasamutu moved into the prefab houses which had been left behind. In 2001 or 2002, granman (paramount chief) Asongo Alalaparu sent a Captain with his extended family to the village.

== Bibliography ==
- Heemskerk, Marieke; Delvoye, Katia (2007). Trio Baseline Study: A sustainable livelihoods perspective on the Trio Indigenous Peoples of South Suriname (PDF). Paramaribo: Stichting Amazon Conservation Team-Suriname.
- Mans, Jimmy (2011). Hofman, Corinne Lisette; Van Duijvenbode, Anne (eds.). Chapter: Trio movements and the Amotopoan flux. Leiden: Sidestone Press. ISBN 978-90-88-90063-1.
