= Washabo Airstrip =

Airport in Washabo, Suriname

- IATA: WSO; ICAO: SMWS

Summary
- Airport type: Public
- Operator: Luchtvaartdienst Suriname
- Serves: Apoera, Suriname
- Location: Washabo
- Elevation AMSL: 68 ft / 21 m
- Coordinates: 5°12′50″N 57°11′08″W

Map
- Location in Suriname

Runways
Direction	Length		Surface
Direction	m	ft	Surface
02/20	500	1,640
- Sources: GCM Google Maps

Washabo Airstrip (IATA: WSO, ICAO: SMWS) is an airstrip near Washabo or Wasjabo and Apoera or Apura in Suriname.

== Charters and destinations ==
Airlines serving charters to this airport are:

Airlines	Destinations
Blue Wing Airlines	Charter: Paramaribo–Zorg en Hoop
Gum Air	Charter: Paramaribo–Zorg en Hoop
Hi-Jet Helicopter Services	Charter: Paramaribo–Zorg en Hoop
United Air Services	Charter: Paramaribo–Zorg en Hoop
Vortex Aviation Suriname	Charter: Paramaribo–Zorg en Hoop

== See also ==
- List of airports in Suriname
- Transport in Suriname
