= Brinckheuvel Nature Reserve =

Nature reserve in Suriname

- IUCN category IV (habitat/species management area)
- Location within Suriname
- Location: Brokopondo District, Suriname
- Nearest city: Kwakoegron
- Coordinates: 5.1333°N 55.3333°W
- Area: 60 km^{2} (23 sq mi)
- Established: 1961
- Governing body: Stinasu

The Brinckheuvel Nature Reserve (Dutch: Natuurreservaat Brinckheuvel) is a protected area and nature reserve in Suriname. The reserve is located on the Saramacca River, and is the most southern savannah of the Savannah Belt. The Mindrineti River flows through the reserve. The reserve measures 6,000 hectares, and has been a protected area since 1961.

== Overview ==
The main reason for protecting the area is the unique Greywacke landscape of the Sabanpasi type. The reserve contains three hills which are topped with white sand caps: the Brinckheuvel, the Klaiberheuvel and the Loblesheuvel.

More than 500 plants species have been collected of which 8 are rare. Animal life has not been well studied, and data is limited to fish. One species of catfish, Corydoras saramaccensis is endemic to the Saramacca River.

The Brinckheuvel Nature Reserve can only be accessed by boat from the village of Kwakoegron.

Gold mining at the nearby Rosebel gold mine may disturb the area. It is unclear whether the savannah is stable, therefore controlled burning is recommended to prevent the reserve turning into a savannah forest.

== Bibliography ==
- Ouboter, Paul E. (2001). "Directory of protected areas of Suriname". IBER.
- Richards, P.; Teunissen, P.A.; Wildschut, J. (1968). "Vegetation and Flora of the Savannas in the Brinckheuvel Nature Reserve, Northern Suriname". Journal of Applied Ecology. 9 (1). British Ecological Society, Wiley: 331. doi:10.2307/2402077. JSTOR 2402077. S2CID 90367542.
