= Wonotobo Falls =

Waterfall in Suriname

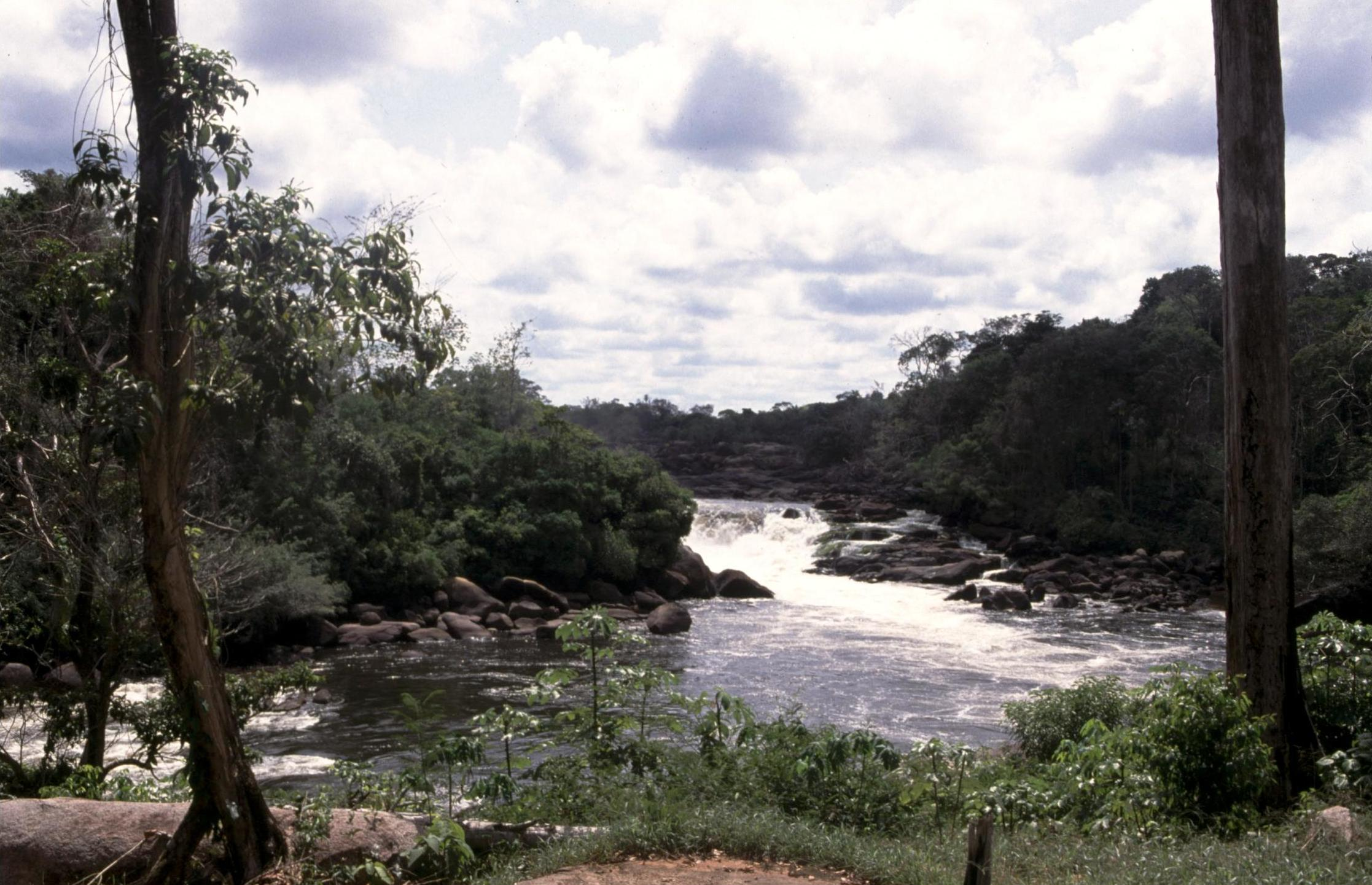

- Location within Suriname
- Location: Courantyne River, Suriname
- Coordinates: 4.37°N 57.95°W

The Wonotobo Falls (Dutch: Wonotobovallen) is a series of waterfalls in the Courantyne River in Sipaliwini District, Suriname near the border with Guyana. The waterfalls are not navigable. A pre-Columbian petroglyph site is located near the falls.

== Overview ==
The waterfalls are situated about 250 kilometres (160 mi) from the mouth of the Courantyne River. The complex consists of the Dutchman Fall, the Blue Crane Fall, the Frenchman Fall, and the Englishman Fall. To pass the falls, canoes have to be transported five kilometres overland. Wanapan, an Amerindian village, is located at the bottom of the falls.

In 1836, Robert Hermann Schomburgk was the first person to venture beyond the falls. Wonotobo is a Kalina word. According to Schomburgk, the full name was "Mawari Wonotopo" (the spot where the blue crane sleeps).

== Petroglyphs ==
At a distance of about 200 metres from the falls, there is an abandoned Amerindian settlement. In July 1959, Dirk Geijskes discovered petroglyphs and pottery near the settlement. A total of 33 petroglyphs have been found. A carbon dating of charcoal yielded an age of 1900 ± 40 BP making it the oldest complex in the Guianas at the time. Most of the petroglyphs are in the Corantijn Basin, and provide an important insight into the ceremonial, mythical and religious world of these precontact indigenous peoples. The petroglyphs at Werehpai, which were discovered later, turned out to be significantly older.

The site is also well known as the habitat of Pseudoplatystoma, a genus of several South American catfish.

== Bibliography ==
- Boomert, Aad (1983). "Saladoid Occupation of Wonotobo Falls, Western Suriname" (PDF). Montréal: Proceedings of the IX International Congress for the Study of Pre-Columbian Cultures of the Lesser Antilles.
