= Boven Coesewijne Nature Reserve =

Nature reserve along the Coesewijne River

- IUCN category IV (habitat/species management area)
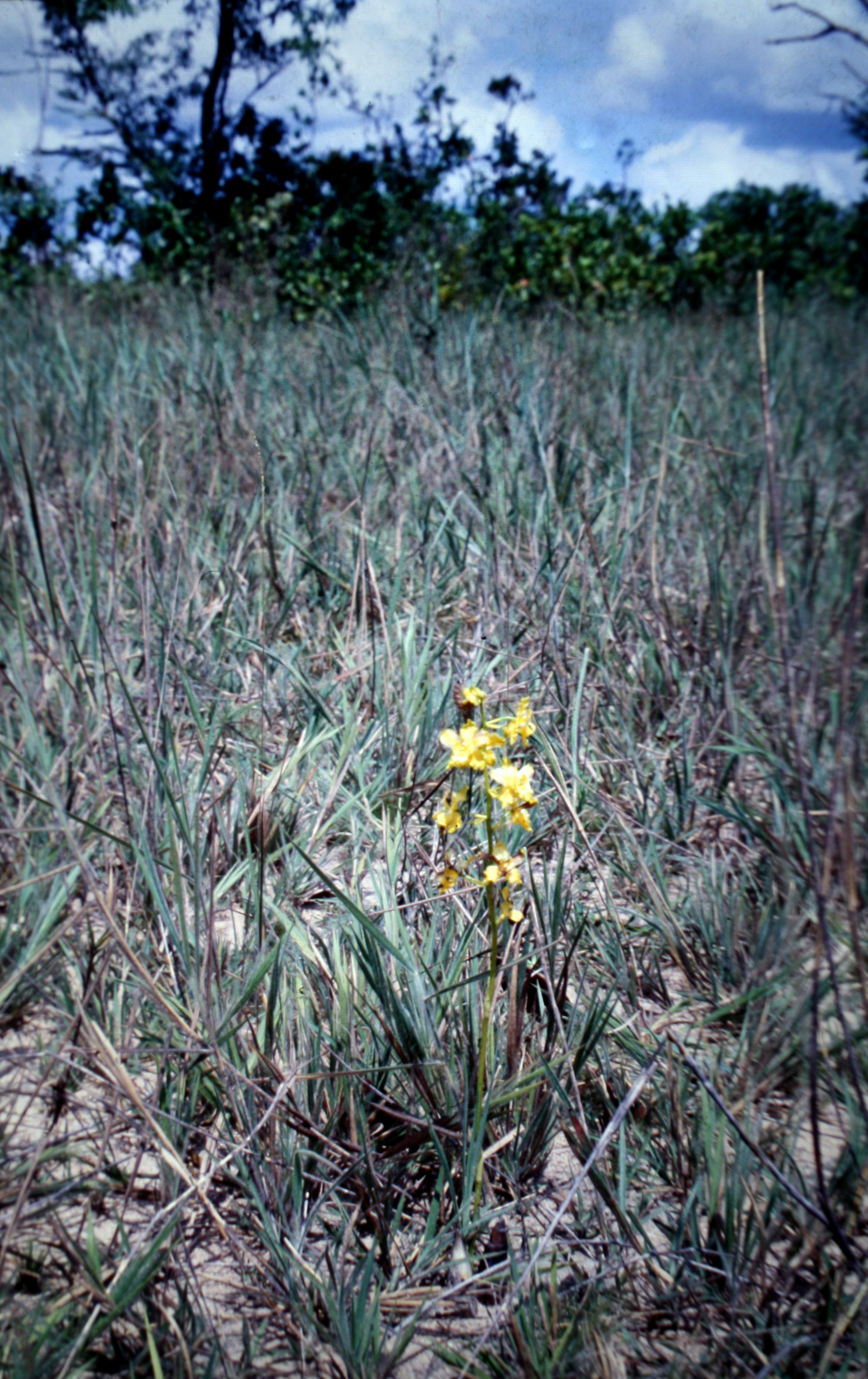
- Cyrtopodium cristatum in a brown sand savannah

- Location within Suriname
- Location: Para & Saramacca District, Suriname
- Nearest city: Bigi Poika
- Coordinates: 5.3745°N 55.5835°W
- Area: 270 km^{2} (100 sq mi)
- Established: 1986
- Governing body: Stinasu

The Boven Coesewijne Nature Reserve (Dutch: Natuurreservaat Boven-Coesewijne) is a protected area and nature reserve in Suriname. The reserve is located along the headwaters of the Coesewijne River. It is important for the brown sand and white sand savannahs located within the reserve.

== Overview ==
Boven Coesewijne Nature Reserve is located at the junction of the coastal plain and the rain-forested interior of Suriname. It contains savannahs, swamp forests, and rainforests. The reserve can be accessed from the village of Bigi Poika or by boat via the river, a long journey which can take more than a day.

The total number of species is 342 of which 22 are restricted to the area. There are over 600 plant species of which 68 are orchids. 23 plants are endemic. Many manatees, giant otters and caimans can be found in the reserve.

== Management ==
The reserve is managed by Stinasu (Stichting Natuurbehoud Suriname). The World Wide Fund for Nature has sponsored Stinasu in 2004 with a donation of $350,000 as part of the Guianas Forests and Environmental Conservation program.

== Threats ==
Land rights have been given to the indigenous population at Bigi Poika. Threats to the reserve include illegal logging, and mercury pollution from gold mining in the Goliath Creek located outside the reserve.

== Bibliography ==
- Ouboter, Paul E. (2001). "Directory of protected areas of Suriname". IBER.
