= Coppename Monding Nature Reserve =

Nature reserve in Suriname

- IUCN category IV (habitat/species management area)
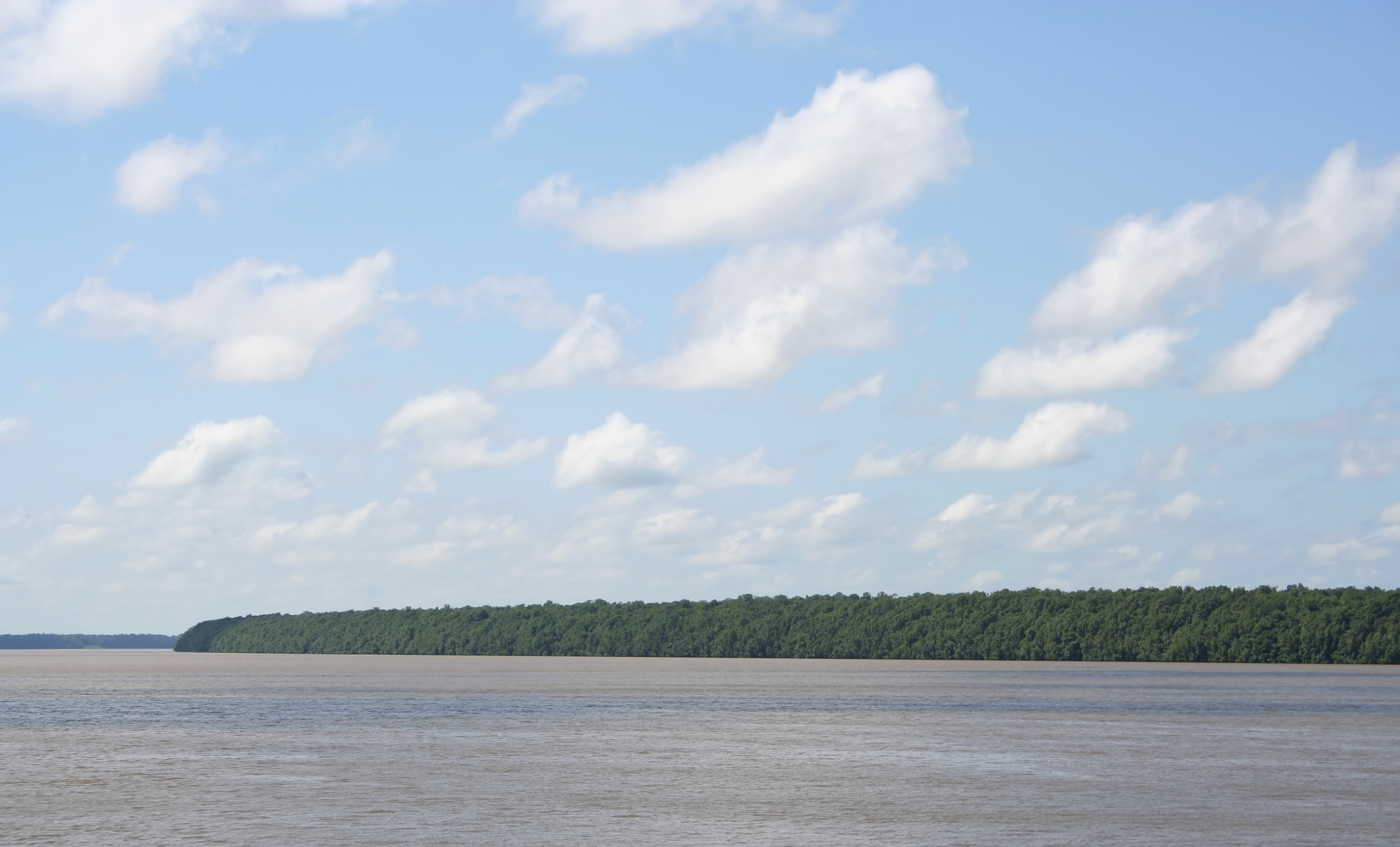
- Estuary of the Coppename River

- Location within Suriname
- Location: Saramacca District, Suriname
- Nearest city: Boskamp
- Coordinates: 5°55′N 55°43′W
- Area: 120 km^{2} (46 sq mi)
- Established: 1961
- Governing body: Stinasu

Ramsar Wetland
- Official name: Coppenamemonding Nature Reserve
- Designated: 22 July 1985
- Reference no.: 304

The Coppename Monding Nature Reserve (Dutch: Natuurreservaat Coppenamemonding) is a protected area and nature reserve in Suriname. The reserve is located near the mouth of the Coppename River. The reserve measures 12,000 hectares, and has been a protected area since 1961.

This wetlands area is an important habitat for breeding birds, and attracts herons, scarlet ibises, and semipalmated sandpipers. Almost 400,000 birds were counted during a survey in 2004. The reserve has been placed on the Ramsar list of wetlands of international importance on 22 July 1985.

== Overview ==
The estuary of the Coppename River was listed on the Police Penal Code of 1915 as an area of special interest. In 1953, it became a game sanctuary, and in 1961, it became a protected area under the Nature Preservation Law.

Coppename Monding consists of mangrove forests and mudflats, and is important for waterfowls and migratory birds. It consists of about 50 kilometres of coast. The southern part of the reserve contains grass swamps. The reserve is managed by Stinasu (Stichting Natuurbehoud Suriname).

== Accessibility ==
The reserve is a restricted area, and can be accessed by boat from the village of Boskamp.

== Bibliography ==
- Ouboter, Paul E. (2001). "Directory of protected areas of Suriname". IBER.
