= Copi Nature Reserve =

Nature reserve in Suriname

- IUCN category IV (habitat/species management area)
- Location within Suriname
- Location: Para District, Suriname
- Nearest city: Stolkertsijver
- Coordinates: 5.513333°N 54.801389°W
- Area: 180 km^{2} (69 sq mi)
- Established: 1986
- Governing body: Stinasu

The Copi Nature Reserve (Dutch: Natuurreservaat Copi) is a protected area and nature reserve in Suriname. The reserve is located along the blackwater Cassewinica Creek. The reserve measures 18,000 hectares, and has been a protected area since 1986.

== Overview ==
The reserve contains a large amount of possumwood (Hura crepitans) which was the main reason for protecting the area. It also contains numerous spectacled caimans (Caiman crocodilus crocodilus), some giant otters (Pteronura brasiliensis), and Cuvier's dwarf caimans (Paleosuchus palpebrosus).

The reserve consists of dry savannas, short grass savannas, and some grass and fern swamps. Copi Nature Reserve is the only state-owned dry clay savannah in Suriname; the other two are privately owned.

== Access ==
The indigenous Lokono village of Copi is located in the area, however it only has a few inhabitants. The indigenous population has the right to fish and hunt in the reserve. Copi can be reached by boat from Stolkertsijver.

== Archaeology ==
The Copi Nature Reserve contains archaeological traces from pre-Columbian times. There are also several abandoned plantations and forts located in the reserve.

== Bibliography ==
- Mohadin, K. (1993). Conservation of freshwater ecosystems in Suriname (PDF). Kluwer.
- Ouboter, Paul E. (2001). "Directory of protected areas of Suriname". IBER.
