= Tiriyó people =

Cariban ethnic group of Brazil, Suriname and Guyana

Tiriyó (Trio)
tarëno
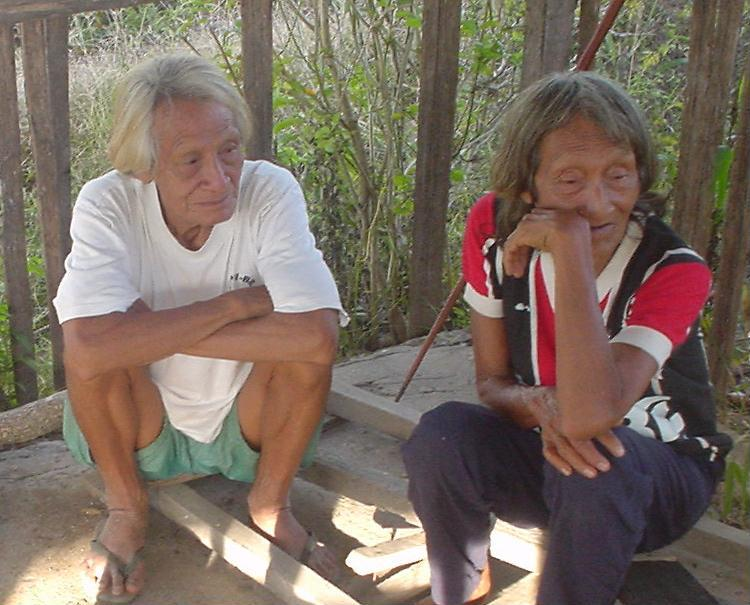
- A Tiriyó man and woman from Brazil

Total population
- 3,640

Regions with significant populations
- Brazil, Suriname
- Brazil: 1,715 (2014)
- Suriname: 1,845 (2006)
- Guyana: >80 (2014)

Languages
- Tiriyó language

Religion
- Traditional, Christian (Catholic in Brazil, Protestant in Suriname)

The Tiriyó (Trió: tarëno, Eastern Maroon Creole: Tiiyo) or Trio are an Amerindian ethnic group native to parts of northern Brazil, Suriname, and Guyana. In 2014, there were approximately 3,640 Tiriyó in the three countries. They live in several major villages and a number of minor villages in the border zone between Brazil and Suriname. They speak the Tiriyó language, a member of the Cariban language family and refer to themselves as tarëno, etymologically 'people from here' or 'local people'.

== History ==
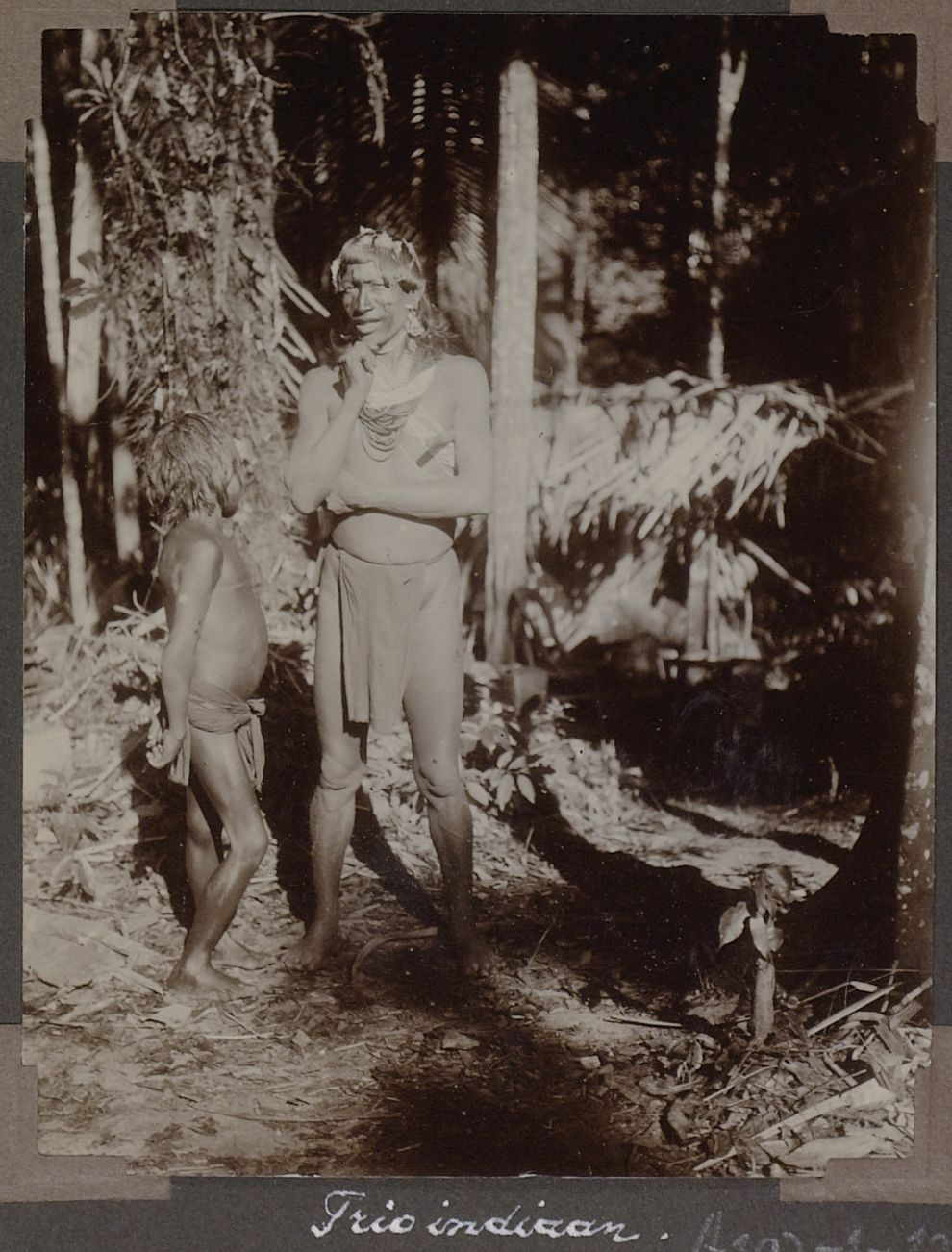
Photo taken during the 1904 Tapanahony Expedition

The modern Tiriyó are formed from various different Indigenous communities; some of these, such as the Aramixó, are mentioned in European writings as early as 1609–1610. Many of the now-Tiriyó groups lived between Brazil and French Guiana until they were driven out by the Oyampi, a Tupi-Guaranian group allied with the Portuguese. Together, the Portuguese and Oyampi drove these groups westward, and they mingled with the groups that were in the area to form the modern Tiriyó group.

As such, the Tiriyó established contact relatively early with runaway slave groups that settled in the area around the end of the 18th century. They maintained regular commercial relations with one group, the Ndyuka, and for many years they were the only contact the Tiriyó had with foreign populations. The first recorded contact between the Tiriyó and a European took place in 1843 between a ‘Drio’ village and Robert Schomburgk; this and the meeting between French explorer Jules Crevaux and a few ‘Trio’ were the only two points of contact between Tiriyó and Europeans in the 19th century. The expeditions in the interior of Suriname in the early 20th century did observe Tiriyós, however they tended to flee when approached, and no useful information could be gathered. In 1907, De Goeje managed to make contact in the Tumuk Humak expedition resulting in the first dictionary of the Tiriyó language.

Subsequent contact between Europeans and Tiriyó in the first half of the twentieth century produced ethnographic and linguistic studies of the region and Tiriyó subgroups in particular. After the ‘exploratory phase’ of contact came the ‘missionary phase,’ wherein newly built airstrips facilitated contact between missionaries and the Tiriyó. These missions tried to concentrate the Tiriyó population in larger villages to more easily convert them to Christianity, and over time, other Indigenous groups such as the Akuriyó joined them here. Until 1957, a village could accommodate up to 50 people. The average life span of a village used to be three to six years, and the death of a captain or chief was often a reason for abandonment as well. The newly acquired agricultural techniques allowed for a bigger population. In 1967, the village of Alalapadu passed the 500 mark, and the soils surrounding the village started to become depleted. The town was abandoned, but not completely as some Tiriyó settled in the vicinity of the old village. The same thing happened with Kwamalasamutu, and in 1997 granman Asongo decided, that part of the population should spread out, also as a defence against encroachment by gold miners and tourist lodges.

== Government ==
Granman of the Tiriyó people in Suriname
- Incumbent; Jimmy Toeroemang since 11 March 2022
- Residence: Kwamalasamutu

The Tiriyó have a high degree of independence, because their settlements are difficult to access. However, they are interested in reinforcing relationships with the foreign world. Traditionally there was no clear hierarchy or a granman (paramount chief).

In 1997, Asongo Alalaparu was appointed granman by the Surinamese President, and captains were appointed to manage the village. In 2011, a District Commissioner had been appointed to represent the central government in the Coeroeni resort. As of 2019, the District Commission is Trees Cirino.

The village of Kasuela is located in the disputed Tigri Area which is claimed by both Guyana and Suriname. The village is headed by Captain Kenke Jaimo who is recognized by both governments.

The Tiriyó in Brazil live in the Tumucumaque Indigenous Park which has been recognized since 1997. In 2004, Apitikatxi, the association of Tiriyó, Kaxuyana and Txikuyana Indigenous peoples was founded to improve rights of Indigenous peoples. The organisation is headed by Demetrio Amisipa Tiriyó.

A problem which remains is that there are two systems: a traditional tribal government and a national government which are often not compatible. The Tiriyó in the larger villages are influenced by schooling, modern day facilities, and telecommunications. The traditional culture is disappearing and young people are beginning to move to the city.

== Indigenous rights ==
A concern is the fundamental rights, because the Tiriyó are spread over three countries, and unlike the Maroons, there are no significant treaties. Mining concessions are often made with the Government without consultation of the native population. Even though the Inter-American Commission on Human Rights ruled in 2007 that all Indigenous and tribal peoples have the right to manage, distribute, and effectively control their territory, Article 41 of the Constitution of Suriname states: "Natural resources and resources are the property of the nation and should be mobilized for economic, social and cultural development. The nation has the inalienable right to take full ownership of its natural resources in order to apply them for the economic, social and cultural development of Suriname." Also in Brazil, Indigenous peoples are often viewed as opponents to economic growth and barriers to development.

== Communities ==
The southernmost villages of Marithepu, Boca do Marapí and Santo Antonio are not indicated on the map. In the densely populated area around Missão Tiriyó and Kuxaré, the villages are not labeled.

| Place | Coordinates | Inhabitants | River | Country |
|---|---|---|---|---|
| Sandlanding | 5°9′47″N 57°10′12″W | 33 | Courentyne | Suriname |
| Wanapan (Arapahtë pata) | 4°22′55″N 57°57′28″W | 25 | Courentyne | Suriname |
| Lucie | 3°34′48″N 57°41′6″W | 18 | Lucie | Suriname |
| Amotopo | 3°32′50″N 57°38′35″W | 27 | Courentyne | Suriname |
| Kuruni | 3°22′12″N 57°20′40″W | 88 | Coeroeni | Suriname |
| Kwamalasamutu | 2°21′23″N 56°47′12″W | 1,100 | Sipaliwini | Suriname |
| Kamani | 2°34′5″N 57°0′30″W | 6 | Kamani | Suriname |
| Sipaliwini Savanna | 2°1′33″N 56°7′29″W | 160 | Sipaliwini | Suriname |
| Alalapadu | 2°31′14″N 56°19′41″W | 75 | Alalapadu | Suriname |
| Pelelu Tepu | 3°9′35″N 55°43′7″W | 600 | Tapanahony | Suriname |
| Palumeu | 3°20′43″N 55°26′35″W | 283 | Tapanahony | Suriname |
| Kampu | 2°58′33″N 55°23′0″W | 10-20 | Paloemeu | Suriname |
| Vier Gebroeders | 1°57′45″N 55°55′45″W | | Vier Gebroederskreek | Suriname |
| Kasuela | 3°16′39″N 57°35′58″W | 80 | New River | Guyana |
| Sakuru | 2°4′21″N 56°53′21″W | | Aramatau | Guyana |
| Cachoeirinha | 1°59′45″N 55°10′55″W | 33 | Paru d'Este | Brazil |
| Matawaré | 1°57′4″N 55°7′10″W | 110 | Paru d'Este | Brazil |
| Iyaherai | 1°42′23″N 54°59′22″W | 52 | Paru d'Este | Brazil |
| Manau | 1°35′11″N 54°55′14″W | 16 | Paru d'Este | Brazil |
| Orokofö Velha | 2°18′3″N 55°56′51″W | 38 | Paru de Oeste | Brazil |
| Orokofö Nova | 2°18′19″N 55°56′17″W | 44 | Paru de Oeste | Brazil |
| Paruaka | 2°17′32″N 55°51′23″W | 55 | Paru de Oeste | Brazil |
| Taratarafö | 2°16′46″N 55°57′13″W | 37 | Paru de Oeste | Brazil |
| Tuha-entu | 2°17′10″N 55°56′33″W | 45 | Paru de Oeste | Brazil |
| Oroi-entu | 2°15′58″N 55°52′55″W | 55 | Paru de Oeste | Brazil |
| Acahé | 2°14′42″N 56°0′23″W | | Paru de Oeste | Brazil |
| Notüpö | 2°14′56″N 55°57′26″W | 56 | Paru de Oeste | Brazil |
| Betânia | 2°14′12″N 55°57′50″W | 202 | Paru de Oeste | Brazil |
| Amana | 2°13′58″N 55°57′55″W | 42 | Paru de Oeste | Brazil |
| Kuritaraimö | 2°13′49″N 55°57′51″W | 33 | Paru de Oeste | Brazil |
| Missão Tiriyó | 2°13′54″N 55°57′39″W | 495 | Paru de Oeste | Brazil |
| Missão Velha | 2°13′17″N 55°57′34″W | 97 | Paru de Oeste | Brazil |
| Muneny | 2°13′15″N 55°54′31″W | 4 | Paru de Oeste | Brazil |
| Ponoto | 2°12′37″N 55°49′47″W | 22 | Paru de Oeste | Brazil |
| Kumuimi | 2°11′43″N 55°57′0″W | 6 | Paru de Oeste | Brazil |
| Arawatá | 2°10′53″N 55°56′36″W | 24 | Paru de Oeste | Brazil |
| Waypa | 2°9′16″N 55°55′1″W | 20 | Paru de Oeste | Brazil |
| Ömetanömpo | 2°8′28″N 55°54′54″W | 26 | Paru de Oeste | Brazil |
| Pedra da Onça | 1°26′9″N 55°39′46″W | 86 | Paru de Oeste | Brazil |
| Santo Antonio | 0°55′18″N 55°45′33″W | 87 | Paru de Oeste | Brazil |
| Aiki | 1°48′39″N 56°4′20″W | 5 | Marapí | Brazil |
| Castanhal | 1°48′1″N 55°57′44″W | 11 | Marapí | Brazil |
| Marihpa | 1°44′26″N 56°4′16″W | 20 | Marapí | Brazil |
| Kuxaré | 1°42′0″N 56°4′10″W | 178 | Marapí | Brazil |
| Urunai | 1°31′3″N 56°5′4″W | 32 | Marapí | Brazil |
| Yawa | 1°21′13″N 56°7′52″W | 56 | Marapí | Brazil |
| Marithepu | 1°5′23″N 56°11′35″W | 56 | Marapí | Brazil |
| Boca do Marapí | 0°36′37″N 55°58′34″W | 31 | Marapí | Brazil |
