= Alalapadu =

- Location in Suriname
- Coordinates: 2°31′14″N 56°19′41″W
- Country: Suriname
- District: Sipaliwini District
- Resort: Coeroeni
- Settled: 1961

Government
  - Head captain: Sede Itashe

Population (2020)
  - Total: 75

Alalapadu is a Tiriyó village in the Sipaliwini District of Suriname. The village was founded by Baptist missionaries next to the Alalapadu Airstrip in order to concentrate the Tiriyó of the area in one central village.

== History ==
In 1961 the missionary Claude Leavitt accompanied by a group of Wai-Wai Amerindians convinced the chief of the village Panapipa to settle into a modern village. The entire population moved in to what became known as Alalapadu. Up to the 1970s, it was biggest Tiriyó village in Suriname. Between 1976 and 1977, Alalapadu was mostly abandoned in favor of the new settlement of Kwamalasamutu, as the soils surrounding the village became depleted. Alalapadu was never completely abandoned, however, and in 1999, some Tiriyó again permanently settled in the vicinity of the old village. The new village is sometimes known as Alalapadu II. Granman Ashongo had requested its rebuilding.

== Overview ==
There is no electricity. The economy is based small-scale farming. There are no schools, so children have to go to boarding school in Kwamalasamutu. There is a Baptist church in the village. In 2017, a Brazil nut oil production facility opened in Alalapadu.
