= Kwamalasamutu =

Kwamalasamutu Kwamalasamoetoe
- Village
- Location in Suriname
- Coordinates: 2°21′23″N 56°47′12″W
- Country: Suriname
- District: Sipaliwini
- Resort: Coeroeni

Government
  - Granman: Jimmy Toeroemang

Population (2020)
  - Total: 1,100

Kwamalasamutu, also Kwamalasamoetoe, is a Tiriyó Amerindian village in the Sipaliwini District of Suriname, and home to the granman (paramount chief) of the northern Trios. Kwamalasamutu is the biggest village of the Tiriyó tribe and is located near the disputed border with Guyana.

== History ==
The village was built in 1971, because Alalapadu was getting too small. The population is estimated at 1,100 as of 2020. Kwamalasamutu has a school, clinic, and a Baptist church, and since 2010 it has access to the telephone network. The economy is based on small-scale agriculture. The village is also home to small groups of the Wai Wai tribe. The last two speakers of the Mawayana language are in Kwamalasamutu as of 2015.

== Tourism ==
The Werehpai archaeological site, which consists of caves containing petroglyphs of pre-Columbian origin, is located about 10 kilometres from Kwamalasamutu.

== Healthcare ==
Kwamalasamutu is home to a Medische Zending healthcare centre.

== Energy ==
Like most villages in the Surinamese interior, Kwamalasamutu relies on diesel generators for electricity. The government provides diesel oil for free to produce electricity for about 5–6 hours per day. In 1994 solar panels were installed with the intention to provide electricity for the entire day, but an evaluation study conducted in 2013 showed that lack of maintenance has meant that none of the systems installed in 1994 still worked in 2013. Instead people have used the panels from 1994 that still worked for their own systems, with some having invested in additional panels themselves. New projects are underway to provide electricity in the interior in a hybrid way, with diesel generators taking over production during night.

== Transportation ==
Kwamalasamutu can be reached by boat on the Sipaliwini River or by plane using the Kwamelasemoetoe Airstrip which offers scheduled services to and from Paramaribo.
