= List of Surinamese football champions =

The Suriname football champions are the winners of the highest league in Suriname football, which is currently the Suriname Major League.

SV Robinhood has 28 league championships, which is the record for most titles won.

== SVB Hoofdklasse (1924-present) ==
Year	Winner (number of titles)	Runners-up	Third Place	Top Scorer	
Year	Winner (number of titles)	Runners-up	Third Place	Player(s)	Goals
1924	Olympia (1)	Unknown	Unknown	Unknown	
1925	SV Transvaal (1)	Unknown	Unknown	Unknown	
1926	Ajax (1)	Unknown	Unknown	Unknown	
1928	Ajax (2)	Unknown	Unknown	Unknown	
1930	Excelsior/Blauw Wit (1)	Unknown	Unknown	Unknown	
1932	Cicerone (1)	Unknown	Unknown	Unknown	
1933	Cicerone (2)	Unknown	Unknown	Unknown	
1934	Cicerone (3)	Unknown	Unknown	Unknown	
1935	Cicerone (4)	Unknown	Unknown	Unknown	
1936	SV Voorwaarts (1)	Unknown	Unknown	Unknown	
1937	SV Transvaal (2)	Unknown	Unknown	Unknown	
1940	Arsenal (1)	Unknown	Unknown	Unknown	
1941	SV Voorwaarts (2)	Unknown	Unknown	Unknown	
1948	MVV (1)	Unknown	Unknown	Unknown	
1949	MVV (2)	Unknown	Unknown	Unknown	
1951	SV Transvaal (3)	Unknown	Unknown	Unknown	
1952	SV Voorwaarts (3)	Unknown	Unknown	Unknown	
1953	SV Robinhood (1)	Unknown	Unknown	Unknown	
1954	SV Robinhood (2)	Unknown	Unknown	Unknown	
1955	SV Robinhood (3)	Unknown	Unknown	Unknown	
1956	SV Robinhood (4)	Unknown	Unknown	Unknown	
1957	SV Voorwaarts (4)	Unknown	Unknown	Unknown	
1959	SV Robinhood (5)	Unknown	Unknown	Unknown	
1961	SV Leo Victor (1)	Unknown	Unknown	Unknown	
1962	SV Transvaal (4)	Unknown	Unknown	Unknown	
1963	SV Leo Victor (2)	Unknown	Unknown	Unknown	
1964	SV Robinhood (6)	Unknown	Unknown	Unknown	
1965	SV Transvaal (5)	Unknown	Unknown	Unknown	
1966	SV Transvaal (6)	Unknown	Unknown	Unknown	
1967	SV Transvaal (7)	Unknown	Unknown	Unknown	
1968	SV Transvaal (8)	Unknown	Unknown	Unknown	
1969	SV Transvaal (9)	Unknown	Unknown	Unknown	
1970	SV Transvaal (10)	Unknown	Unknown	Unknown	
1971	SV Robinhood (7)	Unknown	Unknown	Unknown	
1973	SV Transvaal (11)	Unknown	Unknown	Unknown	
1974	SV Transvaal (12)	Unknown	Unknown	Unknown	
1975	SV Robinhood (8)	Unknown	Unknown	Unknown	
1976	SV Robinhood (9)	Unknown	Unknown	Unknown	
1977	SV Voorwaarts (5)	Unknown	Unknown	Unknown	
1978	SV Leo Victor (3)	Unknown	Unknown	Unknown	
1979	SV Robinhood (10)	Unknown	Unknown	Unknown	
1980	SV Robinhood (11)	Unknown	Unknown	Unknown	
1981	SV Robinhood (12)	Unknown	Unknown	Unknown	
1982	SV Leo Victor (4)	Unknown	Unknown	Unknown	
1983	SV Robinhood (13)	Unknown	Unknown	Unknown	
1984	SV Robinhood (14)	Unknown	Unknown	Unknown	
1985	SV Robinhood (15)	Unknown	Unknown	Unknown	
1986	SV Robinhood (16)	Unknown	Unknown	Unknown	
1987	SV Robinhood (17)	Unknown	Unknown	Unknown	
1988	SV Robinhood (18)	SV Transvaal	SV Leo Victor	Unknown	
1989	SV Robinhood (19)	Unknown	Unknown	Unknown	
1990	SV Transvaal (13)	Unknown	Unknown	Unknown	
1991	SV Transvaal (14)	SV Robinhood	SV Leo Victor	Unknown	
1992	SV Leo Victor (5)	SV Robinhood	SNL	Unknown	
1993	SV Robinhood (20)	SV Leo Victor	SV Transvaal	Unknown	
1994-95	SV Robinhood (21)	Coronie Boys	SV Leo Victor	Unknown	
1995-1996	SV Transvaal (15)	Prekash	Inter Moengotapoe	Unknown	
1997	SV Transvaal (16)	SV Robinhood	SNL	Unknown	
1998-99	SNL (1)	SV Robinhood	SV Transvaal	(Suriname) Robert Lawrence	30
1999-00	SV Transvaal (17)	SNL	Royal '95	(Suriname) Benny Kejansi (Suriname) Ifenildo Vlijter	24
2001-02	SV Voorwaarts (6)	SNL	Royal '95	(Suriname) Clifton Sandvliet	27
2002-03	FCS Nacional (1)	SV Robinhood	House of Billiards	(Suriname) Mario Maasie (Suriname) Gordon Kinsaini	18
2003-04	Walking Boyz Company (1)	Inter Moengotapoe	SV Transvaal	(Suriname) Owen van Cooten	26
2004-05	SV Robinhood (22)	Royal'95	Walking Boyz Company	(Suriname) Cleven Wanabo	24
2005-06	Walking Bout Company (2)	SV Robinhood	Inter Moengotapoe	(Suriname) Clifton Sandvliet	27
2006-07	Inter Moengotapoe (1)	Walking Boyz Company	SV Leo Victor	(Brazil) Alex Soares	28
2007-08	Inter Moengotapoe (2)	SV Robinhood	Boskamp	(Suriname) Ifenildo Vlijter	17
2008-09	Walking Boyz Company (3)	SV Leo Victor	Inter Moengotapoe	(Guyana) Anthony Abrahams	22
2009-10	Inter Moengotapoe (3)	Walking Boyz Company	SV Leo Victor	(Suriname) Amaktie Maasie	14
2010-11	Inter Moengotapoe (4)	Walking Boyz Company	SV Leo Victor	(Suriname) Amaktie Maasie	19
2011-12	SV Robinhood (23)	Inter Moengotapoe	Walking Boyz Company	(Suriname) Ulrich Reding (Suriname) Giovanni Waal	20
2012-13	Inter Moengotapoe (5)	Walking Boyz Company	SV Notch	(Suriname) Galgyto Talea	18
2013-14	Inter Moengotapoe (6)	Excelsior	Walking Boyz Company	(Suriname) Gregory Rigters	16
2014-15	Inter Moengotapoe (7)	SV Notch	Walking Boyz Company	(Suriname) Gregory Rigters	20
2015-16	Inter Moengotapoe (8)	Transvaal	SV Leo Victor	(Suriname) Romeo Kastiel	18
2016-17	Inter Moengotapoe (9)	SV Leo Victor	Walking Boyz Company	(Suriname) Ivanildo Rozenblad	21
2017-18	SV Robinhood (24)	SV Notch	Transvaal	(Suriname) Ivanildo Rozenblad	22
2018-19	Inter Moengotapoe (10)	SV Robinhood	SV Leo Victor	(Suriname) Renzo Akrosie	33
2019-20	Not finished due to COVID-19				
2020-21	No competition due to COVID-19				
2022	SV Robinhood (5)	Inter Moengotapoe	SV Leo Victor	(Suriname) Garvey Kwelling (Suriname) Finidi Masidjan	20
2023	SV Robinhood (26)	Inter Moengotapoe	PVV	(Suriname) Shaquille Cairo	29
2024	SV Robinhood (26)	Transvaal	SV Voorwaarts	(Suriname) Romeo Kastiel	22
2025	Inter Moengotapoe (11)	PVV	SV Robinhood	(Suriname) Ravello Zijler	20
2025–26	SV Broki (1)	SV Robinhood	SV Leo Victor	(Suriname) Ravello Zijler	21

== Total titles won ==
Twenty-three clubs have been crowned champions in the highest division of Suriname football.

Rank	Club	Number of titles	Championship years
1	SV Robinhood	27	1953, 1954, 1955, 1956, 1959, 1964, 1971, 1975, 1976, 1979, 1980, 1981, 1983, 1984, 1985, 1986, 1987, 1988, 1989, 1993, 1995, 2005, 2012, 2018, 2022, 2023, 2024
2	SV Transvaal	17	1925, 1937, 1950, 1951, 1962, 1965, 1966, 1967, 1968, 1969, 1970, 1973, 1974, 1990, 1991, 1996, 1997, 2000
3	Inter Moengotapoe	11	2007, 2008, 2010, 2011, 2013, 2014, 2015, 2016, 2017, 2019, 2025
4	SV Voorwaarts	6	1936, 1941, 1952, 1957, 1977, 2002
5	SV Leo Victor	5	1961, 1963, 1978, 1982, 1992
6	Cicerone	4	1932, 1933, 1934, 1935
7	Walking Boyz Company	3	2004, 2006, 2009
8	V.V. Ajax	1	1926, 1928
9	MVV	2	1948, 1949
10	Arsenal	1	1940
10	FCS Nacional	1	2003
10	SNL	1	1999
10	Excelsior/Blauw Wit	1	1930
10	Olympia	1	1924
10	SV Broki	1	2026
