= List of SVB Eerste Divisie top scorers =

This is a list of Surinamese Hoofdklasse top scorers, that enumerates all players that have finished a season as top goalscorers in the top level of the Surinamese football league system from 1914 (the year that the first championship was disputed) to date.

== Top scorers by year ==
Below is the incomplete list of topscorers from 1964 to date:

| Season | Player | Club | Goals | Matches |
|---|---|---|---|---|
| 1964 | (Suriname (Kingdom of the Netherlands)) Gerrit Niekoop | SV Robinhood | ?? | ?? |
| 1966 | (Suriname (Kingdom of the Netherlands)) Harald Reumel | SV Transvaal | ?? | ?? |
| 1968 | (Suriname (Kingdom of the Netherlands)) Edwin Schal (Suriname (Kingdom of the Netherlands)) Roy Vanenburg | SV Transvaal; SV Transvaal | 14 | ?? |
| 1970 | (Suriname (Kingdom of the Netherlands)) Frits Purperhart | SV Leo Victor | 13 | ?? |
| 1971 | (Suriname (Kingdom of the Netherlands)) Roy Vanenburg | SV Transvaal | 16 | ?? |
| 1972 | (Suriname (Kingdom of the Netherlands)) Frits Purperhart | SV Leo Victor | 14 | ?? |
| 1973 | (Suriname (Kingdom of the Netherlands)) Edwin Schal | SV Transvaal | 20 | ?? |
| 1976 | (Suriname) Errol Emanuelson / Roy George | SV Robinhood | ?? | ?? |
| 1977 | (Suriname) Errol Emanuelson | SV Robinhood | ?? | ?? |
| 1978 | (Suriname) Errol Emanuelson | SV Robinhood | ?? | ?? |
| 1982 | (Suriname) Umberto Klinker | SV Robinhood | ?? | 18 |
| 1983 | (Suriname) Umberto Klinker | SV Robinhood | ?? | 18 |
| 1984 | (Suriname) Delano Rigters | SV Robinhood | ?? | 18 |
| 1987 | (Suriname) Delano Rigters | SV Robinhood | ?? | 18 |
| 1988 | (Suriname) Delano Rigters | SV Robinhood | ?? | 18 |
| 1989 | (Suriname) Delano Rigters (Suriname) Maikel Peel | SV Robinhood; SV Transvaal | ?? | 18 |
| 1998–99 | (Suriname) Robert Lawrence | SV Robinhood | 30 | 18 |
| 1999–2000 | (Suriname) Benny Kejansi (Suriname) Ifenildo Vlijter | Inter Moengotapoe; House of Billiards | 24 | 18 |
| 2000–01 | (No championship held) | | | |
| 2001–02 | (Suriname) Clifton Sandvliet | Walking Boyz Company | 27 | 18 |
| 2002–03 | (Suriname) Gordon Kinsaini (Suriname) Amaktie Maasie | SV Robinhood; SV Leo Victor | 18 | 18 |
| 2003–04 | (Suriname) Owen van Cooten | Young Rhythm | 26 | 18 |
| 2004–05 | (Suriname) Cleven Wanabo | Royal '95 | 24 | 18 |
| 2005–06 | (Suriname) Clifton Sandvliet | Walking Boyz Company | 27 | 18 |
| 2006–07 | (Brazil) Alex Pereira Soares | Jai Hanuman | 28 | 18 |
| 2007–08 | (Suriname) Ifenildo Vlijter | SV Robinhood | 17 | 18 |
| 2008–09 | (Guyana) Anthony Abrams | SV Leo Victor | 22 | 18 |
| 2009–10 | (Suriname) Amaktie Maasie | Inter Moengotapoe | 14 | 18 |
| 2010–11 | (Suriname) Amaktie Maasie | Inter Moengotapoe | 19 | 18 |
| 2011–12 | (Suriname) Ulrich Reding (Suriname) Giovanni Waal | SV Boskamp; SV Leo Victor | 20 | 18 |
| 2012–13 | (Suriname) Galgyto Talea | SV Notch | 18 | 18 |
| 2013–14 | (Suriname) Gregory Rigters | Walking Boyz Company | 16 | 18 |
| 2014–15 | (Suriname) Gregory Rigters | Walking Boyz Company | 20 | 18 |
| 2015–16 | (Suriname) Romeo Kastiel | Inter Moengotapoe | 18 | 18 |
| 2016–17 | (Suriname) Ivanildo Rozenblad | SV Robinhood | 20 | 22 |
| 2017–18 | (Suriname) Ivanildo Rozenblad | SV Robinhood | 22 | 24 |
| 2018–19 | (Suriname) Renzo Akrosie | SNL | 33 | 30 |
| 2019–20 | (No championship held) | | | |
| 2022 | (Suriname) Garvey Kwelling (Suriname) Finidi Masidjan | PVV; SV Notch | 20 | 22 |
| 2022–23 | (Suriname) Shaquille Cairo | SV Robinhood | 29 | 21 |

== Records ==
- Robert "Muis" Lawrence (Laurens) previously held the record for scoring the most goals in a single calendar year, with 30 in the 1998–99 season, but that long-standing record was broken in the 2018–19 season by Renzo Akrosie from Sportvereniging Nationaal Leger (SNL) with 33 goals.

== See also ==
- Surinamese Footballer of the Year
