= Germaine van Dijk =

Surinamese footballer

Personal information
- Full name: Germaine Sergio van Dijk
- Date of birth: 4 August 1983 (age 43)
- Place of birth: Paramaribo, Suriname
- Height: 1.71 m (5 ft 7 in)
- Position: Midfielder

Senior career*
Years	Team	Apps	(Gls)
2004–2009	FCS Nacional		
2009–2011	WBC		
2011–2016	Inter Moengotapoe		
2016–2018	Jong Rambaan		
2018–2019	Bintang Lahir		

International career
2006–2011	Suriname	29	(1)
- * Club domestic league appearances and goals

Germaine Sergio van Dijk (born 4 August 1983) is a Surinamese former professional footballer who played as a midfielder.

== International career ==
Van Dijk played a total of 29 matches for Suriname from 2006 to 2011. He only scored one goal for the national team.

== Career statistics ==
=== International ===
Appearances and goals by national team and year
National team	Year	Apps	Goals
Suriname	2006	5	0
Suriname	2007	–	
Suriname	2008	13	1
Suriname	2009	1	0
Suriname	2010	6	0
Suriname	2011	4	0
Total		29	0

Scores and results list Suriname's goal tally first, score column indicates score after each van Dijk goal.

List of international goals scored by Germaine van Dijk
No.	Date	Venue	Cap	Opponent	Score	Result	Competition	Ref.
1	22 June 2008	Providence Stadium, Providence, Guyana	8	Guyana	1–0	2–1	2010 FIFA World Cup qualification	

== Honours ==
FCS Nacional

- SVB Cup: 2004–05
- Suriname President's Cup: 2005

WBC

- Suriname President's Cup: 2009

Inter Moengotapoe

- SVB Hoofdklasse: 2012–13, 2013–14, 2014–15, 2015–16
- SVB Cup: 2011–12
- Suriname President's Cup: 2011, 2012, 2013
