= Surinamese football clubs in international competitions =

This is a list of Surinamese football clubs in international competitions. Surinamese clubs have participated in competitive international soccer competitions since at least 1968, when Transvaal entered the 1968 CONCACAF Champions' Cup.

Despite being geographically part of South America, Suriname has played in international competitions in CONCACAF due to cultural ties to the Caribbean.

== Results by competition ==
=== CONCACAF Champions Cup / Champions League ===
Year	Team	Progress	Aggregate	Opponent(s)	Results	Ref.
1968	Transvaal	Final	w/o	(Mexico) Toluca	Disqualified by CONCACAF	
1970	Transvaal	Final	2nd	(Mexico) Cruz Azul, (Costa Rica) Saprissa		
1971	Transvaal	Final round	5th	(Costa Rica) Alajuelense, (Guatemala) Comunicaciones, (Mexico) Cruz Azul, (Netherlands Antilles) Estrella, (United States) Rochester Lancers		
1972	Robinhood	Final	0–1	(Honduras) Olimpia	0–0 home, 0–1 away	
1972	Transvaal	First round	2–3	(Suriname) Robinhood	1–0 home, 1–3 away	
1973	Robinhood	First round	2–4	(Netherlands Antilles) Jong Colombia	2–3 home, 0–1 away	
1973	Transvaal	Winners	w/o	(Costa Rica) Saprissa	Walkover	
1974	Robinhood	First round	2–3	(Netherlands Antilles) Jong Colombia	2–2 home, 0–1 away	
1974	Transvaal	Final	2–4	(Guatemala) Municipal	1–2 home, 1–2 away	
1975	Transvaal	Final	1–5	(Mexico) Atlético Español	1–2 home, 0–3 away	
1976	Robinhood	Final	3–8	(El Salvador) Águila	2–3 home, 1–5 away	
1976	Voorwaarts	Semifinals	0–3	(Suriname) Robinhood	0–0 home, 0–3 away	
1977	Robinhood	Final	1–2	(Mexico) América	1–1 home, 0–1 away	
1977	Voorwaarts	Second round	0–2	(Suriname) Robinhood	0–1 home, 0–1 away	
1978	Transvaal	Quarterfinals	2–4	(Trinidad and Tobago) Defence Force	1–1 home, 1–3 away	
1978	Voorwaarts	Semifinals	1–4	(Trinidad and Tobago) Defence Force	1–2 home, 0–2 away	
1979	Leo Victor	Second round	2–3	(Netherlands Antilles) Jong Colombia	2–1 home, 0–2 away	
1979	Robinhood	Semifinals	0–1	(Netherlands Antilles) Jong Colombia	0–0 home, 0–1 away	
1980	Robinhood	Final round	3rd	(Honduras) UNAH, (Mexico) UNAM		
1980	Transvaal	Semifinals	0–3	(Suriname) Robinhood	0–0 home, 0–3 away	
1981	Robinhood	Quarterfinals	0–0 (3–4 p)	(Suriname) Transvaal	0–0 home, 0–0 away	
1981	Transvaal	Winners	2–1	(El Salvador) Atlético Marte	1–0 home, 1–1 away	
1982	Robinhood	Final	2–3	(Mexico) UNAM	0–0 home, 2–3 away	
1982	Transvaal	First round	2–7	(Netherlands Antilles) Jong Holland	2–4 home, 0–3 away	
1983	Leo Victor	First round	4–5	(Aruba) Dakota	3–0 home, 1–5 away	
1983	Robinhood	Final	1–6	(Mexico) Atlante	1–1 home, 0–5 away	
1985	Transvaal	First round	0–0 (3–4 p)	(Netherlands Antilles) Jong Holland	0–0 home, 0–0 away	
1986	Robinhood	Quarterfinals	2–3	(Suriname) Transvaal	0–1 home, 2–2 away	
1986	Transvaal	Final	2–4	(Costa Rica) Alajuelense	1–2 home, 1–2 away	
1988	Leo Victor	First round	2–3	(French Guiana) ASL Sport Guyanais	2–1 home, 0–2 away	
1988	Robinhood	Semifinals	2–3	(Trinidad and Tobago) Defence Force	1–0 home, 1–3 away	
1990	Robinhood	First round	1–2	(Suriname) Transvaal	0–0 home, 1–2 away	
1990	Transvaal	Semifinals	w/o	(Cuba) Pinar del Río	Walkover	
1991	Robinhood	First round	2–3	(Trinidad and Tobago) Defence Force	1–0 home, 1–3 away	
1991	Transvaal	Second round	0–4	(Trinidad and Tobago) Police	0–2 home, 0–2 away	
1992	Robinhood	Semifinals	0–7	(Mexico) América	0–7 neutral	
1992	Transvaal	Second round	2–2 (2–3 p)	(Netherlands Antilles) Sithoc	1–0 home, 1–2 away	
1993	Leo Victor	First round	1–3	(French Guiana) ASL Sport Guyanais	1–3 home, 0–0 away	
1993	Robinhood	Final round	4th	(Mexico) León, (Guatemala) Municipal, (Costa Rica) Saprissa		
1994	Leo Victor	Second round	1–1 (4–5 p)	(Netherlands Antilles) Jong Colombia	1–0 home, 0–1 away	
1994	Robinhood	First round	3–4	(Suriname) Leo Victor	1–0 home, 2–4 away	
1995	Coronie Boys	Second round	1–1 (2–4 p)	(Guadeloupe) Moulien	1–0 home, 0–1 away	
1996	Prakash	Second round	0–1	(Suriname) Transvaal	0–0 home, 0–1 away	
1996	Transvaal	Third round	0–10	(United States) Seattle Sounders	0–10 neutral	
2024	Robinhood	Round of 16	1–3	(Costa Rica) Herediano	1–1 home, 0–2 away	

=== CONCACAF League ===
Year	Team	Progress	Aggregate	Opponent(s)	Results	Ref.
2019	Robinhood	Round of 16	2–3	(Panama) Independiente	1–1 home, 1–2 away	
2021	Inter Moengotapoe	Round of 16	DSQ.	(Honduras) Olimpia	0–6 home, disqualified	

=== CONCACAF Cup Winners Cup / Giants Cup ===
Year	Team	Progress	Aggregate	Opponent(s)	Results	Ref.
1996	Robinhood	First round	1–6	(Trinidad and Tobago) United Petrotrin	0–2 home, 1–4 away	
2001	Transvaal	First round	2–6	(Jamaica) Arnett Gardens	1–1 home, 1–5 away	

=== CONCACAF Caribbean Cup ===
Year	Team	Progress	Aggregate	Opponent(s)	Results	Ref.
1997	Transvaal	Group stage	3rd	(Martinique) Franciscain, (Jamaica) Seba United, (Saint Vincent and the Grenadines) Stubborn Youth		
2000	Robinhood	Group stage	2nd	(Dominica) Harlem United, (Trinidad and Tobago) Joe Public, (Netherlands Antilles) Sithoc		
2001	SNL	Group stage	2nd	(Trinidad and Tobago) Defence Force, (Saint Kitts and Nevis) Garden Hotspurs, (Haiti) Roulado		
2001	Transvaal	Group stage	4th	(Netherlands Antilles) Jong Colombia, (Haiti) RC Haïtien, (Trinidad and Tobago) W Connection		
2003	Nacional	Second round	2–3	(Trinidad and Tobago) W Connection	2–0 home, 0–3 away	
2004	Inter Moengotapoe	Semifinals	6–9	(Jamaica) Harbour View	4–6 home, 2–3 away	
2004	WBC	Quarterfinals	1–3	(Trinidad and Tobago) San Juan Jabloteh	0–0 home, 1–3 away	
2005	Robinhood	Final	2–5	(Jamaica) Portmore United	2–1 home, 0–4 away	
2005	Royal '95	First round	1–3	(Netherlands Antilles) Victory Boys	1–3 home, 0–0 away	
2007	Inter Moengotapoe	Group stage	3rd	(Jamaica) Harbour View, Puerto Rico Islanders, (Antigua and Barbuda) SAP		
2007	Leo Victor	Quarterfinals	1–7	Puerto Rico Islanders	1–7 neutral	
2009	Inter Moengotapoe	Quarterfinals	2–5	(Trinidad and Tobago) San Juan Jabloteh	1–3 home, 1–2 away	
2010	Leo Victor	Group stage	3rd	(Saint Vincent and the Grenadines) Avenues United, (Trinidad and Tobago) Joe Public, (Bermuda) Devonshire Cougars		
2010	WBC	Second round	2nd	(Trinidad and Tobago) Joe Public, (Saint Vincent and the Grenadines) System 3		
2011	Inter Moengotapoe	First round	2–2 (a)	(Guyana) Milerock	1–2 home, 1–0 away	
2011	WBC	Second round	1–8	Puerto Rico Islanders	1–1 home, 0–7 away	
2012	Inter Moengotapoe	Second round	4th	(Antigua and Barbuda) Antigua Barracuda, (Haiti) Victory, (Trinidad and Tobago) W Connection		
2014	Inter Moengotapoe	Group stage	4th	(Trinidad and Tobago) Caledonia AIA, (Haiti) Mirebalais, (Jamaica) Waterhouse		
2014	Notch	Group stage	4th	(Guyana) Alpha United, (Trinidad and Tobago) Defence Force, (Jamaica) Harbour View		
2015	Excelsior	Group stage	4th	(Haiti) América, (Jamaica) Montego Bay United, (Guadeloupe) Moulien		
2015	Inter Moengotapoe	Group stage	3rd	(Guyana) Alpha United, (Trinidad and Tobago) Central		
2016	Notch	Group stage	4th	(Haiti) América, (Jamaica) Arnett Gardens, (Dominican Republic) Atlético Pantoja		
2016	Inter Moengotapoe	Group stage	2nd	(Dominican Republic) Atlántico, (Guadeloupe) Moulien, (Trinidad and Tobago) W Connection		
2017	Inter Moengotapoe	Group stage	2nd	(Saint Vincent and the Grenadines) Bequia United, (Antigua and Barbuda) Hoppers, (Haiti) Racing		
2017	Transvaal	Group stage	3rd	(Jamaica) Portmore United, Puerto Rico FC, (Cayman Islands) Scholars International		
2021	Inter Moengotapoe	Final	0–3	(Haiti) Cavaly	0–3 neutral	
2023	Robinhood	Winners	3–0	(Jamaica) Cavalier	2–0 home, 1–0 away	
2025	Robinhood	Group stage	3rd	(Trinidad and Tobago) Central, (Dominican Republic) Moca, (Jamaica) Mount Pleasant, (Dominican Republic) O&M		

=== CFU Club Shield ===
Year	Team	Progress	Aggregate	Opponent(s)	Results	Ref.
2018	Inter Moengotapoe	Final	1–2	(Martinique) Franciscain	1–2 neutral	
2019	Robinhood	Winners	1–0	(Martinique) Franciscain	1–0 neutral	
2020	Inter Moengotapoe	Cancelled due to the COVID-19 pandemic				
2022	Inter Moengotapoe	Final	1–2	(Puerto Rico) Bayamon	1–2 neutral	
2023	Robinhood	Winners	5–1	(Martinique) Golden Lion	5–1 neutral	
2024	Robinhood	Quarter-finals	1–2	(Antigua and Barbuda) Grenades	1–2 neutral	
2025	Transvaal	Group stage	2nd place	(British Virgin Islands) Wolues, (Antigua and Barbuda) All Saints United		

=== Paramaribo Cup ===
The Paramaribo Cup was a series of friendly matches held in Paramaribo between select Surinamese and Brazilian clubs.

Year	Team	Score	Opponents
1962	Transvaal	1–2	(Brazil) Fortaleza
1963	Transvaal	2–3	(Brazil) Fortaleza
1964	Transvaal	4–0	(Brazil) Olaria
1967	Transvaal	1–3	(Brazil) Tuna Luso

=== Parbo Bier Cup ===
Year	Team	Progress	Aggregate	Opponent(s)	Results	Ref.
2003	Robinhood	Group stage	4th	(Netherlands) NAC Breda, (Suriname) Transvaal, (Suriname) Voorwaarts		
2003	Voorwaarts	Group stage	3rd	(Netherlands) NAC Breda, (Suriname) Robinhood, (Suriname) Transvaal		
2003	Transvaal	Group stage	2nd	(Netherlands) NAC Breda, (Suriname) Robinhood, (Suriname) Voorwaarts		
2004	Leo Victor	Group stage	3rd	Netherlands Antilles NT, Suriname NT, Transvaal		
2004	Transvaal	Group stage	4th	Netherlands Antilles NT, Leo Victor, Suriname NT		
2005	Nacional	Group stage	3rd	(Netherlands) RKC Waalwijk, (Suriname) Robinhood, (Suriname) SBCS		
2005	Robinhood	Group stage	2nd	(Suriname) Nacional, (Netherlands) RKC Waalwijk, (Suriname) SBCS		
2005	SBCS	Group stage	4th	(Suriname) Nacional, (Netherlands) RKC Waalwijk, (Suriname) Robinhood		

== Appearances in CONCACAF competitions ==
As of 15 August 2021

Club	Total						CCL	CFU	CCS	CWC	First Appearance	Last Appearance
Club	Apps	Pld	W	D	L	Win%	CCL	CFU	CCS	CWC	First Appearance	Last Appearance
Coronie Boys	1	2	0	1	1	.250	1	0	0	0	1995 CONCACAF Champions' Cup	1995 CONCACAF Champions' Cup
Excelsior	1	3	0	0	3	.000	0	1	0	0	2015 CFU Club Championship	2015 CFU Club Championship
Inter Moengotapoe	10	39	17	5	17	.500	0	9	1	0	2004 CFU Club Championship	2021 Caribbean Club Shield
Leo Victor	7	19	7	2	11	.400	5	2	0	0	1979 CONCACAF Champions' Cup	2010 CFU Club Championship
Nacional	1	2	1	0	1	.500	0	1	0	0	2003 CFU Club Championship	2003 CFU Club Championship
Notch	2	6	0	0	6	.000	0	2	0	0	2014 CFU Club Championship	2016 CFU Club Championship
Prakash	1	4	1	2	1	.500	1	0	0	0	1996 CONCACAF Champions' Cup	1996 CONCACAF Champions' Cup
Robinhood	22	91	45	18	28	.593	17	3	2	1	1972 CONCACAF Champions' Cup	2019 CONCACAF League
Royal '95	1	2	0	1	1	.250	0	1	0	0	2005 CFU Club Championship	2005 CFU Club Championship
SNL	1	6	3	1	1	.700	0	1	0	0	2001 CFU Club Championship	2001 CFU Club Championship
Transvaal	21	95	56	9	30	.637	17	3	0	1	1968 CONCACAF Champions' Cup	2017 CFU Club Championship
Voorwaarts	3	0	0	0	0	.000	3	0	0	0	1976 CONCACAF Champions' Cup	1978 CONCACAF Champions' Cup
WBC	3	0	0	0	0	.000	0	3	0	0	2004 CFU Club Championship	2011 CFU Club Championship
