= Gregory Pokie =

Surinamese footballer

Personal information
- Full name: Gregory Craymen Pokie
- Date of birth: 29 July 1987 (age 39)
- Place of birth: Paramaribo, Suriname
- Height: 1.77 m (5 ft 10 in)
- Position: Midfielder

Team information
- Current team: Broki

Senior career*
Years	Team	Apps	(Gls)
2007–2008	FCS National		
2009–2017	Inter Moengotapoe		
2017–2018	Botopasi		
2018–2019	WBC		
2019	Happy Boys		
2019–	Broki		

International career
- Suriname U20
2009–2016	Suriname	23	(1)
- * Club domestic league appearances and goals

Gregory Pokie (born 29 July 1987) is a Surinamese professional footballer who plays as a midfielder for SVB Eerste Divisie club Broki.

== Club career ==
Pokie had a lengthy spell with Inter Moengotapoe from 2009 to 2017, and also played for FCS National and Botopasi before joining WBC. In the 2015–16 season, he was voted Surinamese Footballer of the Year, becoming the first Saramaccan player and the first from Brownsweg to win the trophy.

== International career ==
On 22 April 2009, Pokie made his debut for Suriname in a 0–0 friendly draw against French Guiana. He would go on to earn a total of 23 caps, scoring one goal.

=== International goals ===
Scores and results list Suriname's goal tally first.

No.	Date	Venue	Opponent	Score	Result	Competition	Ref
1.	30 January 2015	Dr. Ir. F. Essed Stadion, Paramaribo, Suriname	Bonaire	1–0	3–0	ABCS Tournament	

== Honours ==
Inter Moengotapoe

- SVB Eerste Divisie: 2009–10, 2010–11, 2012–13, 2013–14, 2014–15, 2015–16, 2016–17
- SVB Cup: 2011–12, 2016–17
- Suriname President's Cup: 2010, 2011, 2012, 2013
