= Gilberto Eind =

Surinamese footballer

Personal information
- Full name: Gilberto Eind
- Date of birth: 3 October 1983 (age 43)
- Place of birth: Paramaribo, Suriname
- Height: 1.83 m (6 ft 0 in)
- Position: Centre-back

Team information
- Current team: Broki

Senior career*
Years	Team	Apps	(Gls)
2006–2013	WBC		
2013–2015	SV Excelsior		
2015–2016	Nishan 42		
2016–2019	Robinhood		
2019–	Broki		

International career
2014–2017	Suriname	16	(0)
- * Club domestic league appearances and goals

Gilberto Eind (born 3 October 1983) is a Surinamese professional footballer who plays as a centre-back for SVB Eerste Divisie club Broki.

== International career ==
Eind played for Suriname from 2014 to 2017. His debut was against Bonaire on 5 September 2014. He was at one point the captain of the team.

== Honours ==
WBC

- SVB Hoofdklasse: 2008–09
- SVB Cup: 2008–09, 2012–13
- Suriname President's Cup: 2006, 2009

Nishan 42

- Suriname President's Cup: 2015

Robinhood

- SVB Eerste Divisie: 2017–18
- SVB Cup: 2017–18
- Suriname President's Cup: 2016, 2018
