= Parbo Bier Cup =

- Organiser(s): SIVS
- Founded: 2003
- Region: Worldwide
- Teams: 4
- Current champions: (Netherlands) Vitesse (1st title)

The Parbo Bier Cup is a bi-annual International football tournament, which is organized by the Stichting Internationaal Voetbal Suriname (SIVS) of which former Surinamese-Dutch International Stanley Menzo is the chairman. The beer brewery Parbo is the sponsor of the tournament after which it was named.

== History ==
Edition	Winner	Runner-up	Third-place	Fourth-place
2003	(Netherlands) NAC Breda	(Suriname) Transvaal	(Suriname) Voorwaarts	(Suriname) Robinhood
2004	Netherlands Antilles	Suriname	(Suriname) Leo Victor	(Suriname) Transvaal
2005	(Netherlands) RKC Waalwijk	(Suriname) Robinhood	(Suriname) FCS Nacional	(Suriname) SBCS
2007	Suriname-U23	(Suriname) Suriprofs	(France) French Guiana-U23	Guyana-U23
2009	(France) French Guiana	(Suriname) Natio/Suriprofs	Antigua and Barbuda	Guyana
2012	(Netherlands) Vitesse	Guyana	(Suriname) Natio/Suriprofs	-

=== Parbo Bier Cup 2003 ===
The 2003 Parbo Bier Cup marked the first edition of the tournament contested from the 15th to 19 January. The participants included Dutch Eredivisie side NAC Breda and Surinamese Hoofdklasse clubs S.V. Robinhood, S.V. Transvaal and S.V. Voorwaarts. NAC Breda won the first Parbo Bier Cup, winning all their matches, defeating Transvaal (5–0) in their final match. Transvall finished the tournament as runner-up, leaving Voorwaarts in third, and Robinhood in fourth place.

=== Parbo Bier Cup 2004 ===
The 2004 edition of the Parbo Bier Cup was contested by the national teams of the Netherlands Antilles and Suriname, plus two SVB Hoofdklasse clubs, S.V. Transvaal and S.V. Leo Victor. The Netherlands Antilles won the cup with seven points, defeating Transvaal (2–1), Leo Victor (3–2), and drawing with Suriname (1–1), clinching the second edition of the tournament.

=== Parbo Bier Cup 2005 ===
The Parbo Bier Cup 2005 was the third edition of the tournament. Participating teams were Dutch Eredivisie club RKC Waalwijk, and Surinamese Hoofdklasse clubs S.V. Transvaal, FCS Nacional and SBCS. RKC Waalwijk won all their matches thus winning the cup, followed by Transvaal, Nacional and SBCS, each having won one match, deciding the final placement on goal difference.

=== Parbo Bier Cup 2007 ===
The Parbo Bier Cup of 2007 was the fourth edition of the tournament. The participating teams were the under-23 teams of French Guiana-U23, Guyana-U23, Suriname-U23 and the Suriprofs, an unofficial team made up of Surinamese expatriates living in Europe. The Suriname under-23 team won the tournament with seven points, defeating Guyana (2–1), drawing with French Guiana (0–0) and defeating the Suriprofs (1–0).

=== Parbo Bier Cup 2009 ===
The Parbo Bier Cup of 2009 was the fifth edition of the tournament and was held on the 3rd, 5th and 7 June. The four participating teams were the national teams of Antigua and Barbuda, Guyana, French Guiana and Suriname which was represented by a selection of players of the Suriname national team and the Suriprofs.

==== Matches ====
3 June 2009

Antigua and Barbuda	2 - 1	Guyana
Fredericks 79'; Griffith 90'		34' Parks

André Kamperveen Stadion, Paramaribo
3 June 2009

Natio/Suriprofs (Suriname)	0 – 2	French Guiana
		Loan Azor 12' unknown

André Kamperveen Stadion, Paramaribo
5 June 2009
19:00 (UTC-3)

French Guiana	2 – 1	Antigua and Barbuda
unknown Yemounou		18' unknown

André Kamperveen Stadion, Paramaribo
5 June 2009
21:00 (UTC-3)

Natio/Suriprofs (Suriname)	5 – 1	Guyana
Lens 23', 48'; Drenthe 52'; Sordam 86'; Madramosto 93' (o.g.)		30' Grant

André Kamperveen Stadion, Paramaribo
7 June 2009

French Guiana	3 – 2	Guyana
onb. 21' onb. 53' unknown 72'		26' Gilkes; 64' Parks

André Kamperveen Stadion, Paramaribo
7 June 2009

Natio/Suriprofs (Suriname)	1 – 0	Antigua and Barbuda
Pokie

André Kamperveen Stadion, Paramaribo

==== Final table ====
Team	GP	W	D	L	GS	GA	GD	Pts
French Guiana	3	3	0	0	6	3	+6	9
(Suriname) Natio/Suriprofs	3	2	0	1	6	3	+3	6
Antigua and Barbuda	3	1	0	2	3	4	-1	3
Guyana	3	0	0	3	4	10	-6	0

==== Suriname (Natio/Suriprofs) selection ====
Pos.	Name	Club	Country	Apps ^{1}	Goals
GK	Rodney Ubbergen	Telstar	(Netherlands)	1	0
GK	André Zebeda	Robinhood	(Suriname)	0	0
DF	Marlon Felter	Walking Boyz Company	(Suriname)	1	0
DF	Rinaldo Lupson	Walking Boyz Company	(Suriname)	1	0
DF	Gregory Pokie	Walking Boyz Company	(Suriname)	0	0
DF	Naldo Kwasie	Transvaal	(Suriname)	0	0
DF	Steve Olfers	Aalborg BK	(Denmark)	0	0
DF	Milano Koenders	N.E.C.	(Netherlands)	1	0
DF	Kelvin Maynard	FC Volendam	(Netherlands)	0	0
DF	Hesdey Suart	Helmond Sport	(Netherlands)	1	0
DF	Edson Braafheid ^{2}	FC Twente	(Netherlands)	0	0
DF	Sigourney Bandjar	Excelsior	(Netherlands)	1	0
MF	Germain van Dijck	Robinhood	(Suriname)	1	0
MF	Emilio Limón	Robinhood	(Suriname)	1	0
MF	Ives Vlijter	Inter Moengotapoe	(Suriname)	1	0
MF	Romano Sordam	Transvaal	(Suriname)	0	0
MF	Edgar Davids	Unattached	(Netherlands)	3	0
MF	Anduele Pryor	Vitesse	(Netherlands)	0	0
FW	Giovanni Drenthe	Voorwaarts	(Suriname)	2	1
FW	Gregory Rigters	Voorwaarts	(Suriname)	0	0
FW	Claudio Pinas	Inter Moengotapoe	(Suriname)	1	0
FW	Touvarno Pinas	Telstar	(Netherlands)	0	0
FW	Leroy George	FC Utrecht	(Netherlands)	1	0
FW	Jeremain Lens	AZ Alkmaar	(Netherlands)	3	2

=== Parbo Bier Cup 2011 ===
In 2011 the Parbo Bier Cup was cancelled, due to the fact that the main sponsors of the Surinamese Football Association (SVB) at the André Kamperveen Stadion had left no room for the main sponsors of the tournament at the stadium.

=== Parbo Bier Cup 2012 ===
The participants for the 2012 edition of the Parbo Bier Cup were the Suriprofs/Natio, the national team of Guyana and Dutch Eredivisie club SBV Vitesse. Vitesse finished the tournament as winners of the cup, while Vitesse player Jonathan Reis was awarded the golden boot award as the most valuable player of the tournament.

Vitesse selection: Patrick van Aanholt, Just Berends, Alexander Büttner, Brahim Darri, Jan-Arie van der Heijden, Nicky Hofs, Julian Jenner, Mart Lieder, Alex Santos da Vitória, Anderson Santos da Vitória, Sander van de Streek, Frank van der Struijk, Jonathan Reis, Eloy Room, Piet Velthuizen, Wimilio Vink, Michihiro Yasuda.

==== Matches ====
23 May 2012
20:00 (UTC-3)

Vitesse (Netherlands)	4 – 2	Guyana
Reis 9' 16'; Van Aanholt 38'; Dennis 63' (e.d.)	Report	43' (pen.) Benfield; 69' Joseph

André Kamperveen Stadion, Paramaribo
Attendance: 1.000
Referee: (Suriname) Andy Pierau
25 May 2012
20:00 (UTC-3)

Suriprofs/Natio (Suriname)	1 – 2	Guyana
Koenders 80'	Report	49' (pen.) Benfield (?) Wilson

André Kamperveen Stadion, Paramaribo
Attendance: 2.500
27 May 2012
18:00 (UTC-3)

Suriprofs/Natio (Suriname)	1 – 2	(Netherlands) Vitesse
Schmeltz 86'	Report	54' Reis; 82' Berends

André Kamperveen Stadion, Paramaribo
Attendance: 3.900
Referee: (Suriname) Enrico Wijngaarde

Team	GP	W	D	L	GS	GA	GD	Pts
(Netherlands) Vitesse	2	2	0	0	6	3	+3	6
Guyana	2	1	0	1	4	5	-1	3
(Suriname) Suriprofs/Natio	2	0	0	2	2	4	-2	0

== Participation ==
=== By country ===
Rank	Country	Berths	Teams
1	Suriname	13	Suriname national team (3), Suriprofs (3), Robinhood (2), Transvaal (2), FCS Nacional (1), Leo Victor (1), SBCS (1), Suriname U-23 (1), Voorwaarts (1)
2	Guyana	3	Guyana national team (2), Guyana U-23 (1)
2	Netherlands	3	NAC Breda (1), RKC Waalwijk (1), Vitesse (1)
3	French Guiana	2	French Guiana national team (1), French Guiana U-23 (1)
4	Antigua and Barbuda	1	Antigua and Barbuda national team (1)
4	Netherlands Antilles	1	Netherlands Antilles national team (1)

== Titles and awards ==
=== Number of titles ===
Nr.	Club	Titles	Winning years
1	(Netherlands) Vitesse	1	2012
1	French Guiana	1	2009
1	Suriname U-23	1	2007
1	(Netherlands) RKC Waalwijk	1	2005
1	Netherlands Antilles	1	2004
1	(Netherlands) NAC Breda	1	2003

== See also ==
- Parbo Bier
