= Desi Samson =

Surinamese footballer (1919–2000)

Personal information
- Full name: Desiré Samson
- Date of birth: 10 February 1919
- Place of birth: Paramaribo, Suriname
- Date of death: 3 September 2000 (aged 81)
- Place of death: Paramaribo, Suriname
- Position: Forward

Senior career*
Years	Team	Apps	(Gls)
1933–1937	Cicerone		
1937–1938	S.V. Arsenal		
1938–1953	MVV		

International career
- Suriname

Managerial career
- Rio
- Maasstroom Commewijne
- Commewijne selection
- Voorwaarts
- Coronie Boys
- Suriname national youth selection
- MVV
- * Club domestic league appearances and goals

Desiré "Desi" Samson (10 February 1919 – 3 September 2000) was a Surinamese footballer, football manager and referee. A forward, he played club football for Cicerone, S.V. Arsenal and MVV and was a long-time member of the Suriname national team.

== Early life ==
Samson was born on 10 February 1919 on Weidestraat in Paramaribo. He attended St. Paulusschool and spent much of his youth near the Cultuurtuin, where he practised as a young footballer. In addition to football, Samson participated in several other sports, including athletics, swimming, cricket, boxing, basketball, volleyball and badminton.

== Club career ==
Samson began playing senior football with V.V. Cicerone as a teenager. After initially playing for the club's second team, he progressed to the first team, competing in the Hoofdklasse, the top flight of football in Suriname.

He played for Cicerone from 1933 to 1937, S.V. Arsenal from 1937 to 1938 and MVV from 1938 until the end of his playing career in 1953.

== International career ==
Samson was first selected for the Suriname national team in December 1935, but did not travel with the team to a tournament in Cayenne. In 1938, he missed a tour of the Netherlands Antilles, Trinidad and Demerara after his employer, De Surinaamsche Bank, refused to grant him permission to travel. He subsequently played regularly for Suriname until December 1952 and spent approximately eighteen years as a member of the national selection.

In November 1943, Samson played for Suriname against British Guiana. On 21 November he scored the only goal in a 1–0 victory and scored again the following day in a 4–0 win. Suriname won the Betty Brown Challenge Cup during the series. From 1946, Samson served on several occasions as vice-captain and captain of the national team.

In 1948, Samson travelled to the Netherlands with the Suriname national team, the team's first ever trip to Europe. On 5 August, Suriname drew 2–2 with Ajax at the Olympic Stadium in Amsterdam. Samson opened the scoring in the 17th minute, while André Kamperveen later scored Suriname's equaliser. Two days later, Suriname lost 3–1 to Feyenoord at De Kuip in Rotterdam. Additional games were played against Tilburg XI, Quick Nijmegen, Be Quick, DFC, and Den Haag XI. During the tour, Samson received a caution following a challenge on Dutch international Bertus de Harder. Samson later stated that it was the only caution he received during his playing career.

In 1950, Samson played for Suriname against Brazilian club Náutico. He and René Nelom scored Suriname's goals in a 2–2 draw on 9 May.

In December 1952, Samson suffered a knee injury. Continuing problems with the injury forced him to withdraw from a four-team tournament in Aruba in 1953. It was later determined that he had suffered a torn meniscus, and he ended his playing career in 1953.

== Refereeing and coaching career ==
Samson joined the Eerste Surinaamse Scheidsrechtersvereniging (First Surinamese Referees' Association) in 1937. Following his retirement as a player, he became a referee in the highest division of Surinamese football. He refereed until 1958 and also officiated international matches.

As a coach, Samson was involved with Rio, Maasstroom Commewijne, the Commewijne representative team, Voorwaarts, Coronie Boys, a Surinamese national youth selection and MVV. He was also involved in coaching football at the Inter-Guianese Games for schoolchildren.

== Football administration ==
Samson served for approximately ten years on a technical committee. He was a board member of MVV from 1948 to 1957 and was responsible for the club's technical management from 1953 to 1957. He also served on several committees within Surinamese football, including bodies concerned with youth football, refereeing and scouting.

== Personal life ==
Outside football, Samson worked for De Surinaamsche Bank for approximately two and a half years. In 1938, he became a career soldier, a career he continued for nineteen years. In 1957, he joined the Popular Education and Civic Education department of the Ministry of Education and retired from government service on 6 June 1980.

Samson married Margaret Emely "Rieke" Becker on 2 November 1940.

Samson also wrote about football for the sports magazine Sportarena. In 1989, he wrote the foreword, titled Woord van waardering, to Guno Hoen's book Onze sporthelden. Deel 2 ("Our sports heroes. Part 2").

Samson died in Paramaribo on 3 September 2000, aged 81.

A sports complex in Paramaribo, the Desi Samson Sportcomplex, was named after Samson. The complex is located in the Tamenga/Kasabaholo area and includes facilities used for sports and recreation.
