= Ferdinand Jap A Joe =

Surinamese footballer

Personal information
- Full name: Ferdinand Jap A Joe
- Date of birth: 13 February 1981 (age 45)
- Place of birth: Suriname
- Position: Defender

Senior career*
Years	Team	Apps	(Gls)
2000–2009	Robinhood		
2009–2019	WBC		

International career
2000–2009	Suriname	26	(1)
- * Club domestic league appearances and goals

Ferdinand Jap A Joe (born 13 February 1981) is a Surinamese former professional footballer who played as a defender. He played for the Suriname national team from 2000 to 2009, making 26 appearances and scoring one goal.

== International career ==
Out of his 26 caps for Suriname, Jap A Joe made 12 appearances in FIFA World Cup qualification. His only goal for the national team came in a 3–1 win over Dominica on 9 August 2008.

=== International goals ===
Suriname score listed first, score column indicates score after the Jap A Joe goal.

International goals by date, venue, opponent, score, result and competition
No.	Cap	Date	Venue	Opponent	Score	Result	Competition	Ref.
1	16	9 August 2008	Blaimont Ground, Ithaca, Guyana	Dominica	3–1	3–1	Caribbean Cup qualification	

== Honours ==
Robinhood

- SVB Hoofdklasse: 2004–05
- SVB Cup: 2000–01, 2005–06, 2006–07
- Suriname President's Cup: 2001

WBC

- SVB Cup: 2012–13
- Suriname President's Cup: 2009
