= Gerrit Niekoop =

Surinamese footballer

Personal information
- Full name: Arnod Gerrit Niekoop
- Place of birth: Diitabiki, Suriname
- Position: Forward

Senior career*
Years	Team	Apps	(Gls)
1954–1966	Robinhood		
1966–1970	MVV		

International career
1959–1965	Surinam	10	(4)
- * Club domestic league appearances and goals

Arnod Gerrit Niekoop is a Surinameseformer football player, referee and board member of the Surinamese Football Association, as well as board member and former chairman of the Surinamese Refereeing Commission.

During his playing career he played in the Surinamese Hoofdklasse for S.V. Robinhood and M.V.V., and for the Suriname national team. He spent most of his professional playing career with S.V. Robinhood, winning five national titles, finishing as the league top scorer in 1964.

== Club career ==
=== SV Robinhood ===
Born in Diitabiki, Surinam, Niekoop joined S.V. Robinhood in 1954. Playing together with Humphrey Mijnals, Siegfried Haltman and Kenneth Kluivert during his career with Robinhood, he helped form the dangerous attack of Robinhood, only rivaled by S.V. Transvaal at the time. In 1964 he led Robinhood to an undefeated season, winning the National championship and finishing as the leagues top goal scorer that same season.

=== MVV ===
In 1966, he joined M.V.V. (Militaire Voetbal Vereniging), the football club of the military. He would continue his goal scoring habits at his new club, playing with the likes of Armand Doesburg and George Headley, who were considered a dangerous attacking tandem.

== International career ==
Niekoop played for the Suriname national team, playing in the nation's first Olympic qualifiers following the foundation of the Surinamese Olympic Committee (S.O.C.) in 1959.

He made his first appearance in a friendly match on 20 September 1959 against Martinique scoring the winning goal on his debut. On 20 March 1964, he scored the equalizer in a 2–2 draw with the Netherlands Antilles in the countries first Olympic qualifying match. Niekoop scored additional goals in both losses against Argentina and Peru, before Suriname were eliminated in the second round. He also played in the CCCF Championship as well as the countries 1966 FIFA World Cup qualifying campaign.

== Refereeing career ==
Following his playing career, Niekoop became a referee in the SVB Hoofdklasse in Suriname. Licensed by both FIFA and CONCACAF, Niekoop has refereed for International tournaments, including the 2008 CONCACAF Women's U-17 Championship and the 2012 CONCACAF Men's Olympic qualifiers.

As a member of the Surinamese Refereeing Commission, he became the chairman of the board, as well as a board member of the Surinamese Football Association. No longer the chairman, he is still a member of the board and has been involved in the official training and licensing of referees in Suriname by FIFA.

In June 2012, Niekoop was present when former Jungle Commando leader and owner of football club Inter Moengotapoe, Ronnie Brunswijk, intimidated the assistant referee and tore his shirt during a match against S.V. Transvaal, in which Transvaal had been awarded a free kick.

== Career statistics ==
Scores and results list Suriname' goal tally first.

Goal	Date	Venue	Opponent	Score	Result	Competition
1.	20 September 1959	National Stadion, Paramaribo, Suriname	Martinique	1–0	1–0	Friendly
2.	10 October 1959	Rif Stadion, Willemstad, Netherlands Antilles	Netherlands Antilles	1–1	2–2	1960 Summer Olympics qualification
3.	16 April 1960	Estadio Nacional, Lima, Peru	Argentina	2–2	2–6	1960 Summer Olympics qualification
4.	19 April 1960	Estadio Nacional, Lima, Peru	Peru	1–0	1–3	1960 Summer Olympics qualification

== Honors ==
S.V. Robinhood

- SVB Hoofdklasse (5): 1955, 1956, 1959, 1961, 1964

Individual

- SVB Hoofdklasse Top Goalscorer (1): 1964
