= 1937 SVB Eerste Klasse =

Football season

Eerste Klasse
- Season: 1937
- Dates: 28 February 1937 – 13 August 1937
- Champions: Transvaal
- Matches: 17

The 1937 SVB Eerste Klasse was the twelfth season of the Eerste Klasse. Transvaal won their second title.

== Teams and locations ==
| Team | Location |
|---|---|
| Cicerone | Paramaribo |
| Go Ahead | Paramaribo |
| MVV | Paramaribo |
| Paramount | Paramaribo |
| PVV | Paramaribo |
| Remo | Paramaribo |
| Transvaal | Paramaribo |
| Vios | Paramaribo |
| Voorwaarts | Paramaribo |

== League table ==
Note: The following table is compiled from known results reported in the news media and RSSSF, and may not align with the official table. Not all results have been reported.

| Pos | Team | Pld | W | D | L | GF | GA | GD | Pts |
|---|---|---|---|---|---|---|---|---|---|
| 1 | Voorwaarts | 8 | | | | | | | 25 |
| 1 | Transvaal | 8 | | | | | | | 22 |
| 3 | Go Ahead | 6 | 6 | 4 | 1 | | | | 21 |
| 4 | Paramount | 7 | | | | | | | 5 |
| 5 | Cicerone | 4 | 1 | 2 | 1 | 5 | 2 | +3 | 4 |
| 6 | PVV | 5 | | | | | | | 4 |
| 7 | Vios | 4 | | | | | | | 2 |
| 8 | Remo | 4 | 0 | 1 | 3 | | | | 1 |
| 9 | MVV | 4 | 0 | 0 | 4 | | | | 0 |

== Championship play-off ==
13 August 1937

| Transvaal | 3–1 | Voorwaarts |

Transvaal won the SVB Eerste Klasse.
