= 1936–37 SVB Eerste Klasse =

Football season

Eerste Klasse
- Season: 1936–37
- Dates: 16 February 1936 – 12 January 1937
- Champions: Voorwaarts
- Matches: 22
- Goals: 53 (2.41 per match)

The 1936–37 SVB Eerste Klasse was the eleventh season of the Eerste Klasse. Voorwaarts won their first title.

== Teams and locations ==
Team	Location
Cicerone	Paramaribo
El Deportivo	Paramaribo
Go Ahead	Paramaribo
Jong Ajax	Paramaribo
MVV	Paramaribo
Paramount	Paramaribo
PVV	Paramaribo
Transvaal	Paramaribo
Voorwaarts	Paramaribo

== League table ==
Pos	Team	Pld	W	D	L	GF	GA	GD	Pts	
1	Voorwaarts	6	6	0	0	17	1	+16	12	Champions
2	Cicerone	6	4	0	2	14	10	+4	8	
3	PVV	6	3	1	2	9	6	+3	7	
4	Go Ahead	6	2	1	3	5	10	−5	5	
5	MVV	6	2	0	4	7	10	−3	4	
6	Paramount	6	1	1	4	6	13	−7	3	
7	Transvaal	6	1	1	4	6	13	−7	3	Dissolved
8	El Deportivo	0	0	0	0	0	0	0	0	Dissolved
9	Jong Ajax	0	0	0	0	0	0	0	0	Withdrew

Source: RSSSF
Rules for classification: 1) Points; 2) Head-to-head points; 3) Head-to-head goal difference; 4) Head-to-head goals scored; 5) Goal difference; 6) Goals scored
