= Leroy George =

Surinamese footballer

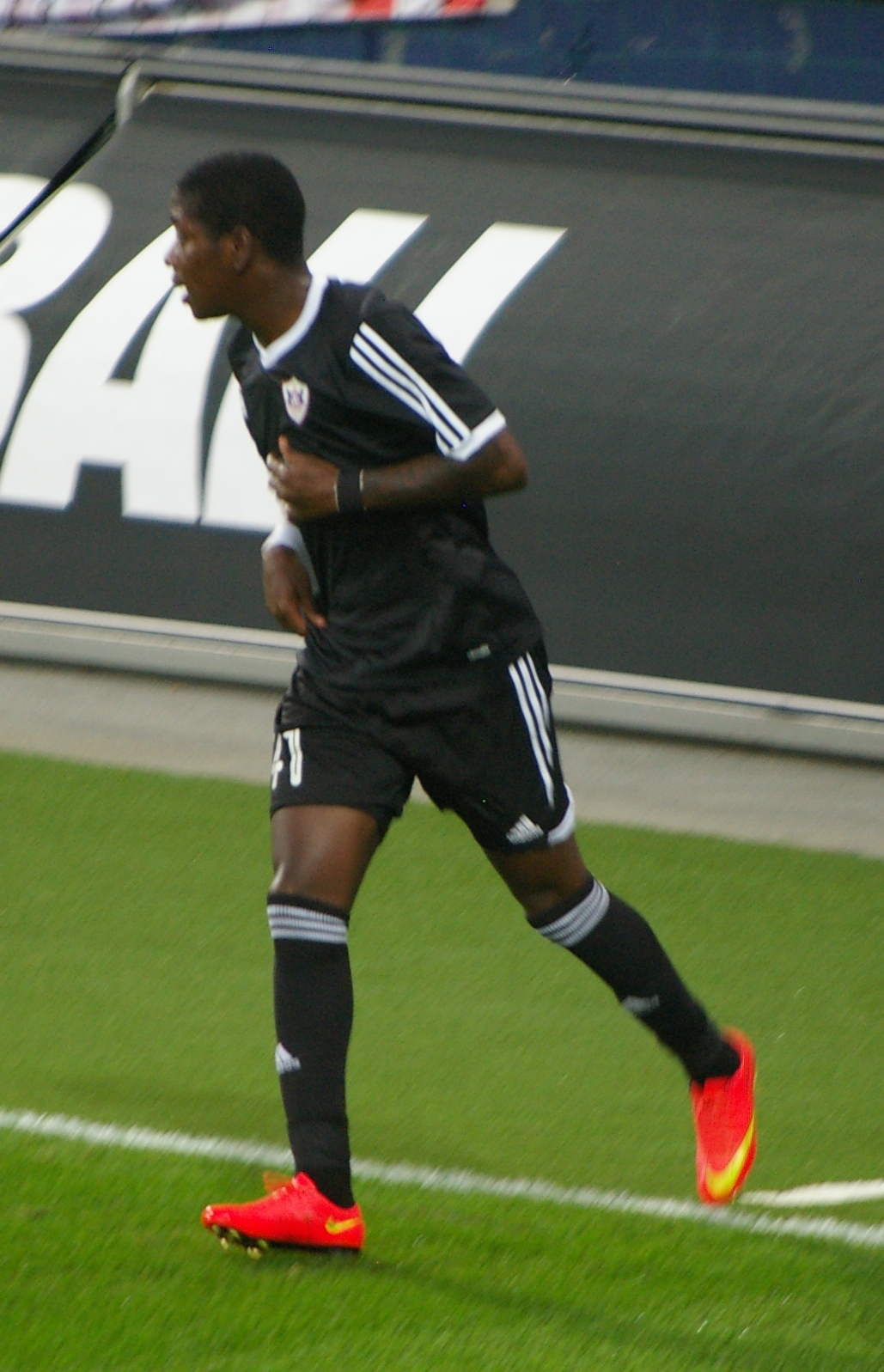
- George with Qarabağ in 2014

Personal information
- Full name: Leroy Martin Giovanni George
- Date of birth: 21 April 1987 (age 39)
- Place of birth: Paramaribo, Suriname
- Height: 1.75 m (5 ft 9 in)
- Position: Winger

Team information
- Current team: Real Sranang

Youth career
- DWS
- Fortius
- ZSGOWMS

Senior career*
Years	Team	Apps	(Gls)
2006–2010	Utrecht	73	(8)
2010–2013	NEC	81	(11)
2013–2015	Qarabağ	59	(19)
2015–2017	Göztepe	34	(6)
2017	Adana Demirspor	15	(2)
2017–2018	Melbourne Victory	29	(9)
2018–2020	Baniyas	25	(7)
2021	Fortuna Sittard	3	(0)
2021–2022	De Treffers	31	(4)

International career
2008	Netherlands U20	2	(0)
2007–2008	Netherlands U21	2	(0)
- * Club domestic league appearances and goals as of 09:36, 13 July 2022 (UTC)

Leroy Martin Giovanni George (born 21 April 1987) is a Dutch footballer who plays as a winger for Dutch amateur side Real Sranang. Aside from the Netherlands, he has played in Turkey, Australia, Azerbaijan, and the United Arab Emirates.

His natural position is as a right forward or right winger, but he has also proven to be useful on the left wing, as a striker and as an attacking midfielder while at FC Utrecht, NEC and the Victory.

== Club career ==
=== Youth career ===
Being born in Paramaribo, Suriname and growing up in Amsterdam, George started his youth career at the local clubs DWS, Fortius and ZSGOWMS before being noticed by FC Utrecht.

=== FC Utrecht ===
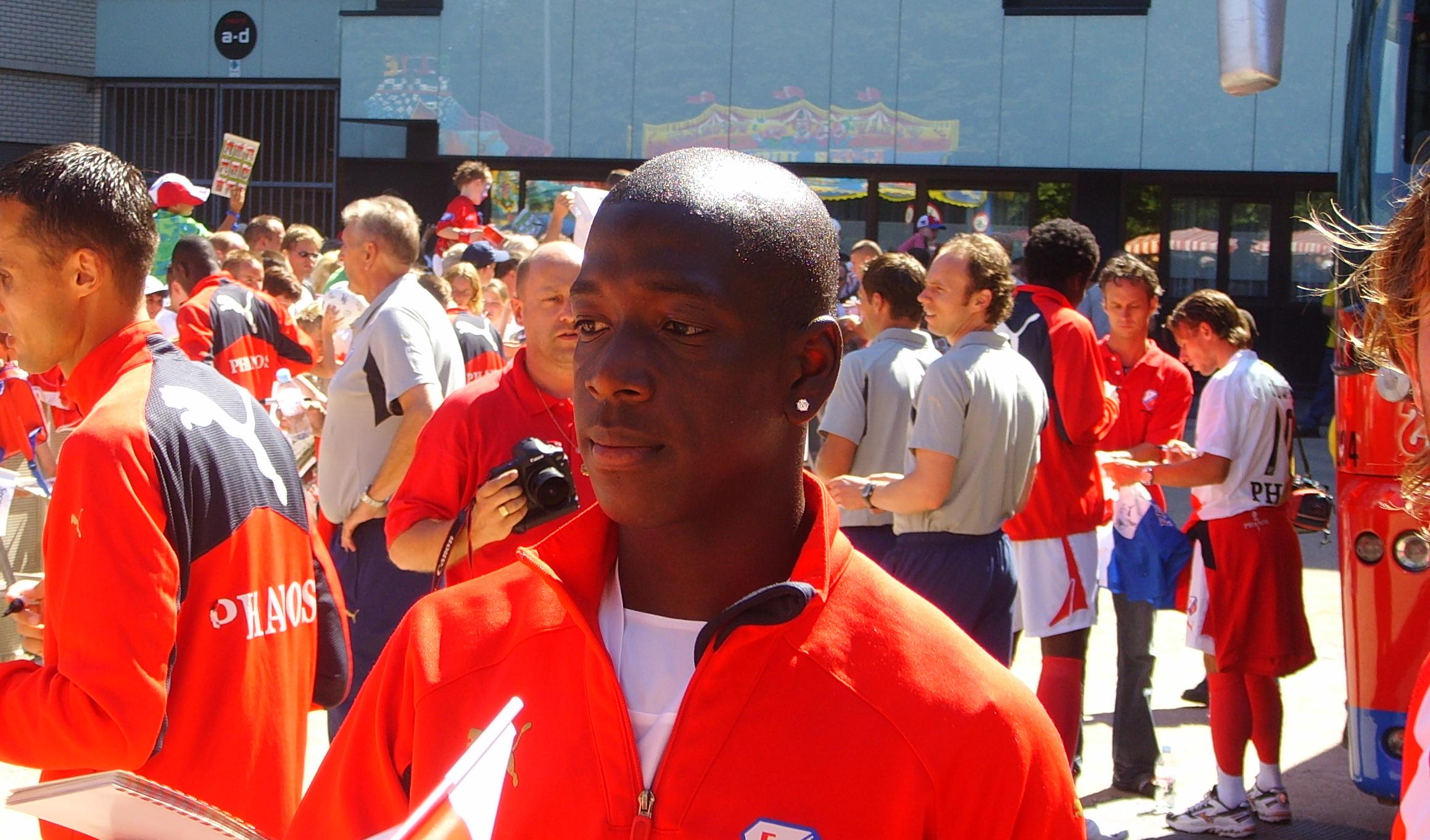
George with FC Utrecht in 2007

He made his debut for the senior side on 13 April 2007, in an away-match against Sparta Rotterdam, ending 1–1. He replaced Etienne Shew-Atjon in the beginning of the second half, and scored a debut goal in the 68th minute, sealing the draw. He played two more matches this season.

The following year, George had established himself into the starting lineup; he only missed one match because of a suspension, and scored seven times that season. At the end of the season, it was announced that he had signed a contract extension with Utrecht, keeping him in the Domstad until mid-2011, despite some problems with his agent. The forward started the 2008–09 season well, but because of growing problems with his physical shape, he lost his place in the starting eleven after a couple of weeks. After showing an unmotivated behavior, he was sent back to the reserve squad by manager Willem van Hanegem. A week later his behavior had improved, and he was forgiven and put back on the first team, and since then he played a majority of the games.

After the 2008–09 season, he lost track and almost never played anymore. In the 2009–10 season he only played eight matches, and after the season was over, he was told that he was not needed anymore at the club, and thus put on the transfer list.

=== NEC ===
On 20 July 2010, it was published that George had signed a one-year deal with NEC The club put an option in his contract to extend his contract with two more seasons if he lives up to the expectations of the club. In the second round of the 2010–11 Eredivisie season, George was awarded as the best player of the round, after having two assists in an away-match against Willem II. The match ended in a 3–5 victory for NEC.

=== Qarabağ ===
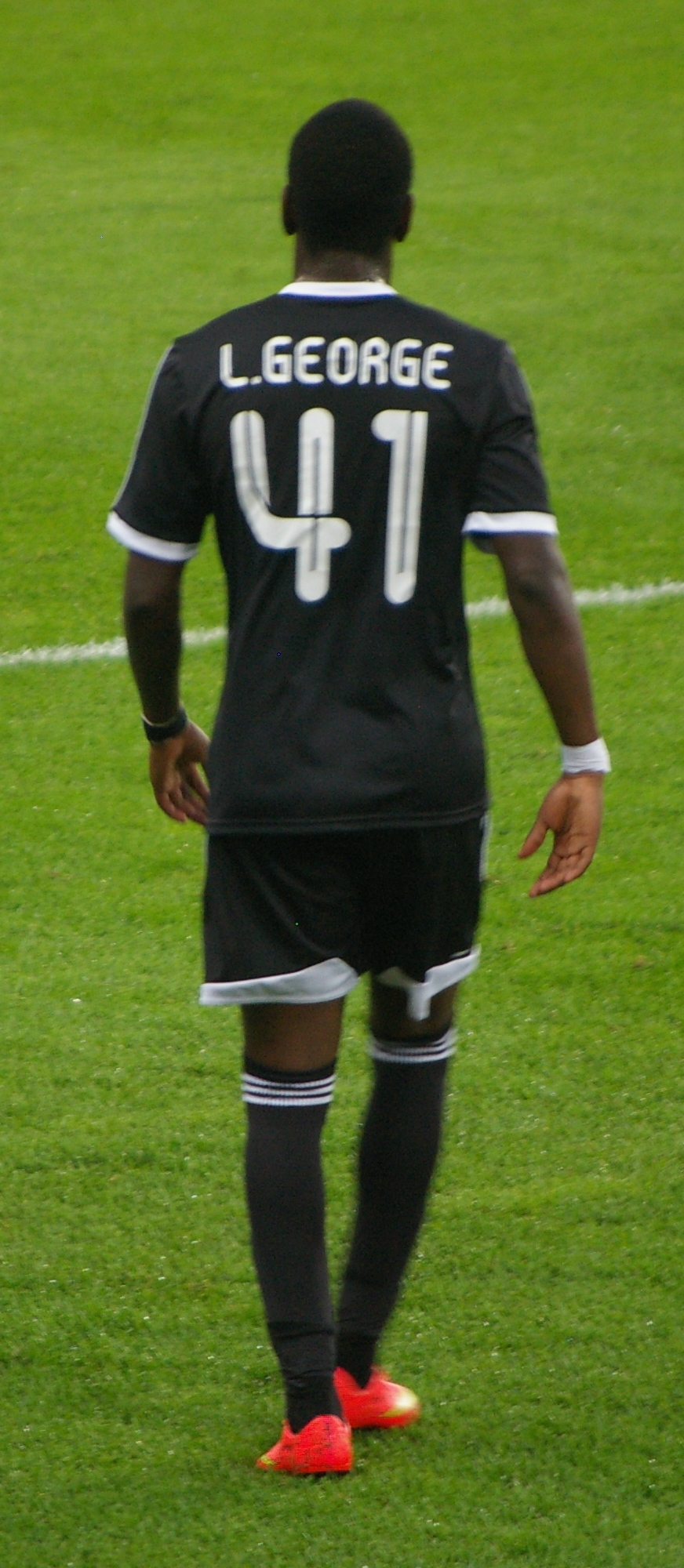
George with Qarabağ in 2014

On 6 June 2013, George signed a two-year contract with Azerbaijan Premier League side Qarabağ. George made his debut for Qarabağ away to Metalurg Skopje in the UEFA Europa League first qualifying round match on 2 July 2013, coming on as an 84th-minute substitute for fellow debutante Nikoloz Gelashvili.

George already scored twice for Qarabağ in the Europa League – one against Metalurg Skopje (11 July 2013, second leg) and another against Piast Gliwice (25 July 2013, second leg) on away match. George left Qarabağ at the end of his contract in June 2015.

=== Göztepe ===
On 8 July 2015, George signed a two-year contract with Göztepe S.K.

=== Melbourne Victory ===
Melbourne Victory announced that George had signed a one-year deal with the club on 16 September 2017.

He played a key role in the Victory's championship winning season, scoring 9 goals, and registering a league high 14 assists. His successful season saw him crowned as the 2017-18 Victory Medallist with 53 votes.

=== Baniyas ===
In July 2018, George signed with UAE First Division League club Baniyas.

=== Fortuna Sittard ===
On 26 January 2021, Fortuna Sittard announced that they had signed George for the remainder of the season. George made his debut two days after signing against RKC Waalwijk coming off the bench in a 2–1 win.

=== De Treffers ===
On 27 August 2021, he joined De Treffers in the Dutch third tier.

== International career ==
George was called up for the Netherlands under-21 team various times in 2007 and 2008 by national team coach, Foppe de Haan, but only managed to play twice.

Having been born in Paramaribo in Suriname, George was eligible to play for the Surinamese national team. He was called up for the Parbo Bier Cup in 2009 with a mixed team of Surinamese and Dutch-Surinamese players.

== Career statistics ==
=== Club ===
As of 3 June 2015

Club performance			League		Cup		League Cup		Continental		Total	
Season	Club	League	Apps	Goals	Apps	Goals	Apps	Goals	Apps	Goals	Apps	Goals
Netherlands			League		KNVB Cup		League Cup		Europe		Total	
2006–07	Utrecht	Eredivisie	3	1	4	0	-		-		7	1
2007–08	Utrecht	Eredivisie	33	7	3	0	-		-		36	7
2008–09	Utrecht	Eredivisie	31	1	3	1	-		-		34	2
2009–10	Utrecht	Eredivisie	7	0	0	0	-		-		7	0
2010–11	NEC	Eredivisie	22	3	0	0	-		-		22	3
2011–12	NEC	Eredivisie	28	5	3	0	-		-		31	5
2012–13	NEC	Eredivisie	31	3	1	1	-		-		32	4
Azerbaijan			League		Azerbaijan Cup		League Cup		Europe		Total	
2013–14	Qarabağ	Premier League	32	9	3	0	-		8	2	43	11
2014–15	Qarabağ	Premier League	27	10	5	0	-		10	2	42	12
Turkey			League		Turkish Cup		League Cup		Europe		Total	
2015–16	Göztepe	TFF First League	26	6	0	0	-		-		26	6
2016–17	Göztepe	TFF First League	8	0	7	1	-		-		15	1
2016–17	Adana Demirspor	TFF First League	15	2	-		-		-		15	2
Australia			League		Australia Cup		League Cup		Asia		Total	
2017–18	Melbourne Victory	A-League	29	9	0	0	-		5	3	34	12
United Arab Emirates			League		President's Cup		League Cup		Asia		Total	
2018–19	Baniyas	UAE Pro League	25	7	1	0	7	2	-		33	9
Netherlands			League		KNVB Cup		League Cup		Europe		Total	
2020–21	Fortuna Sittard	Eredivisie	3	0	0	0	-		-		3	0
2021–22	De Treffers	Tweede Divisie	31	4	2	0	-		-		33	4
Total	Netherlands		189	24	16	2	-		-		205	26
Total	Azerbaijan		59	19	8	0	-		18	4	85	23
Total	Turkey		49	8	7	1	-		-		56	9
Total	Australia		29	9	0	0	-		5	3	34	12
Total	United Arab Emirates		25	7	1	0	7	2	-		33	9
Career total			351	67	32	3	7	2	23	7	413	79

== Honours ==
=== Club ===
Qarabağ

- Azerbaijan Premier League (2): 2013–14, 2014–15
- Azerbaijan Cup (1): 2014–15

Melbourne Victory

- A-League Championship: 2017–18
