= Alex (footballer, born February 1982) =

Brazilian footballer

Personal information
- Full name: Alex Pereira Soares
- Date of birth: February 1, 1982 (age 44)
- Place of birth: Belém, Brazil
- Position: Forward

Senior career*
Years	Team	Apps	(Gls)
2005–2009	Jai Hanuman		
2009–2010	WBC		
- * Club domestic league appearances and goals as of 22:31, 26 January 2016 (UTC) ‡ National team caps and goals as of 22:31, 26 January 2016 (UTC)

Alex Pereira Soares (born February 1, 1982) known as Alex, is a Brazilian footballer who last played as a forward for Walking Boyz Company in the SVB Hoofdklasse. He finished the 2006–07 season as the league's top scorer while playing for SV Jai Hanuman.

== Career ==
Born in Belém, Brazil, Alex moved to Paramaribo, Suriname joining SV Jai Hanuman competing in the SVB Eerste Klasse, the 2nd tier of football in Suriname. Helping Jai Hanuman to win the league title, and thus promoting to the SVB Hoofdklasse, Alex provided 28 goals, finishing as the league top scorer while helping his side to a 5th-place finish in the league table once promoted to the top flight.

In 2009, he joined Walking Boyz Company, playing in the 2010 CFU Club Championship, making four appearances, against Guyana Defence Force (Guyana), Alpha United (Guyana), Joe Public (Trinidad and Tobago), and System 3 (Saint Vincent and the Grenadines) where his team were eliminated in the second round of the competition.

== Honors ==
=== Club ===
SV Jai Hanuman

- SVB Eerste Klasse: 2005–06

=== Individual ===
- SVB Hoofdklasse Top Goalscorer: 2006–07
