= Giovanni Waal =

Surinamese footballer

Personal information
- Date of birth: May 25, 1989 (age 37)
- Place of birth: Paramaribo, Suriname
- Position: Forward

Team information
- Current team: Inter Moengotapoe
- Number: 9

Senior career*
Years	Team	Apps	(Gls)
2009–2011	Voorwaarts	?	(?)
2011–2012	Leo Victor	?	(20)
2012–2014	Robinhood	?	(?)
2014–	Inter Moengotapoe	?	(?)

International career^{‡}
2010–	Suriname	26	(4)
- * Club domestic league appearances and goals as of October 8, 2015 ‡ National team caps and goals as of October 8, 2015

Giovanni Waal (born May 25, 1989) is a Surinamese footballer who plays as a forward for Inter Moengotapoe in the Hoofdklasse, and for the Suriname national team.

== Career ==
Waal began his career at SV Voorwaarts in Paramaribo, making his debut in the 2009-10 SVB Hoofdklasse season. After two season he transferred to SV Leo Victor, finishing the season as the league's joint top scorer together with Ulrich Reding (of SV Boskamp), both finishing with 20 goals each. The following season saw Waal transfer to SV Robinhood where he played for two seasons. In 2014 Waal transferred to Inter Moengotapoe winning the National championship in his first season with his new club.

== International career ==
Waal plays International football for Suriname, having made his debut in the final qualifying round of the 2010 Caribbean Cup, in the 2–1 loss against Antigua and Barbuda. He also participated in the team's 2014 FIFA World Cup qualification campaign, making four appearances against Cayman Islands, Dominican Republic and El Salvador, failing to help his team advance to further qualifying rounds. On 9 June 2012 he scored his first goal for the national team in a friendly match against French Guiana which ended in a 2–1 loss. He has also represented Suriname in the 2012 Caribbean Cup qualification, the 2018 FIFA World Cup qualification and the ABCS Tournament.

== Career statistics ==
=== International performance ===
Statistics accurate as of matches played on 16 June 2015,

Suriname national team
Year	Apps	Goals
2010	2	0
2011	8	0
2012	9	4
2013	2	0
2014	0	0
2015	5	0
Total	26	4

==== International goals ====
Scores and results list Suriname' goal tally first.

Goal	Date	Venue	Opponent	Score	Result	Competition
1.	9 June 2012	Stade de Baduel, Cayenne, French Guiana	French Guiana	1–2	1–2	Friendly match
2.	13 July 2012	Trinidad Stadium, Oranjestad, Aruba	Bonaire	3–0	8–0	ABCS Tournament
3.	6 September 2012	Stade Municipal Pierre-Aliker, Le Lamentin, Martinique	Montserrat	1–0	7–1	2014 FIFA World Cup qualification
4.	6 September 2012	Stade Municipal Pierre-Aliker, Le Lamentin, Martinique	Montserrat	2–0	7–1	2014 FIFA World Cup qualification

== Honors ==
=== Club ===
Inter Moengotapoe

- SVB Hoofdklasse (1): 2014–15

=== Individual ===
- SVB Hoofdklasse Top Goalscorer: 2011–12 (joint)
