= 2023 Suriname President's Cup =

2009 Suriname President's Cup
Robinhood	Inter Moengotapoe
3	0
- Date: 18 February 2024
- Venue: Frank Essed Stadion, Paramaribo

The 2023 Suriname President's Cup was the 26th edition of the Suriname President's Cup. It was won by Robinhood who beat Inter Moengotapoe 3–0 in the final.

== Match details ==
18 February 2024

Robinhood	3–0 (a.e.t.)	Inter Moengotapoe
Rigters 100'; Singodikromo 118' 119'	Report

Frank Essed Stadion, Paramaribo
Attendance: 3,500
