= 2014–15 SVB Hoofdklasse =

Hoofdklasse
- Season: 2014–15
- Champions: Inter Moengotapoe
- Relegated: Boma Star; SNL
- CONCACAF Champions League: TBD
- CFU Championship: Inter Moengotapoe; Notch
- Top goalscorer: (Suriname) Gregory Rigters (20 goals)

The 2014–15 Surinamese Hoofdklasse is the 82nd season of the SVB Hoofdklasse, the highest football league competition of Suriname. The season began in October 2014, and will finish in June 2015.

== Changes from 2013–14 ==
- Robinhood was relegated to the SVB Eerste Klasse; it was the first time Robinhood will be playing outside of the top division since 1948
- Botapaise was promoted to the Hoofdklasse, replacing relegated Robinhood

== League table ==
Pos	Team	Pld	W	D	L	GF	GA	GD	Pts	Qualification or relegation
1	Inter Moengotapoe (C)	18	12	4	2	40	12	+28	40	2016 CFU Club Championship
2	Notch	18	11	6	1	40	18	+22	39	2016 CFU Club Championship
3	Walking Bout Company	18	11	1	6	46	28	+18	34	
4	Leo Victor	18	9	3	6	42	29	+13	30	
5	Transvaal	18	7	2	9	24	37	−13	23	
6	Botapaise	18	6	4	8	31	37	−6	22	
7	Excelsior	18	6	4	8	25	33	−8	22	
8	Takdier Boys	18	5	3	10	30	44	−14	18	
9	Boma Star	18	4	4	10	25	40	−15	16	Qualification to Relegation playoffs
10	SNL (R)	18	2	3	13	18	43	−25	9	Relegation to 2015–16 SVB Eerste Klasse

Source: Soccerway
Rules for classification: 1) points; 2) goal difference; 3) number of goals scored.
(C) Champions; (R) Relegated

=== Relegation playoffs ===
The team which finishes 9th, will face the 2nd-placed 2014–15 SVB Eerste Klasse side for a two-legged play-off. The winner on aggregate score after both matches earns entry into the 2015–16 SVB Hoofdklasse. SV Robinhood defeated Boma Star in the two legged series.

==== First leg ====
12 June 2015
19:00 SST (UTC−03:00)

Boma Star	4–3	Robinhood
	Report

Dr. Ir. Franklin Essed Stadion, Paramaribo
Attendance: 3,500

==== Second leg ====
19 June 2015
19:00 SST (UTC−03:00)

Robinhood	3–0	Boma Star
	Report

Dr. Ir. Franklin Essed Stadion, Paramaribo
Attendance: 3,500

Robinhood won 6–4 on aggregate.
