= 2013–14 SVB Hoofdklasse =

SVB Hoofdklasse
- Season: 2013-14
- Champions: Inter Moengotapoe
- Matches: 80
- Goals: 272 (3.4 per match)
- Top goalscorer: (Suriname) Gregory Rigters (16 goals)

Statistics during the 2013–14 SVB Hoofdklasse season.

== League table ==
Pos	Team	Pld	W	D	L	GF	GA	GD	Pts	Qualification
1	Inter Moengotapoe (C)	18	14	2	2	42	17	+25	44	Qualification for 2014–15 Caribbean Club Championship
2	Excelsior	18	12	2	4	40	28	+12	38	Qualification for 2014–15 Caribbean Club Championship
3	Leo Victor	18	9	5	4	38	20	+18	32	
4	WBC	18	8	5	5	46	30	+16	29	
5	SNL	18	7	4	7	36	39	−3	25	
6	Notch	18	4	7	7	26	30	−4	19	
7	Takdier Boys	18	5	4	9	24	31	−7	19	
8	Transvaal (O)	18	4	6	8	19	30	−11	18	
9	Boskamp (R)	18	5	3	10	32	45	−13	18	Play-off relegation to Eerste Klasse
10	Robinhood (R)	18	0	6	12	20	53	−33	6	Relegation to Eerste Klasse

(C) Champions; (O) Play-off winners; (R) Relegated
