= Cleven Wanabo =

Surinamese footballer

Personal information
- Date of birth: 7 October 1976 (age 50)
- Place of birth: Paramaribo, Suriname
- Position: Forward

Senior career*
| Years | Team | Apps | (Gls) |
| 2001–2007 | Royal '95 | | (24) |
| 2007–2008 | Walking Boyz Company | | |
| 2008–2012 | Inter Moengotapoe | | |

International career^{‡}
| 2008 | Suriname | 6 | (2) |
- * Club domestic league appearances and goals as of 8 October 2015 ‡ National team caps and goals as of 8 October 2015

Cleven Wanabo (born 7 October 1976) was a Surinamese footballer playing as a forward for Inter Moengotapoe in the Hoofdklasse. He has also played for the Suriname national team.

== Career ==
Wanabo began his career at Royal '95 in Paramaribo, making his debut in the 2001-02 SVB Hoofdklasse season. He became the league's top goalscorer during the 2004–05 season, and in 2007 transferred to Walking Boyz Company where he played for one year before moving to Inter Moengotapoe winning the national title in 2015.

== International career ==
Wanabo plays International football for Suriname, having made his debut on 11 October 2008 in the 2010 FIFA World Cup qualification match against Costa Rica which ended in a 4-1 loss. He also participated in the teams' 2008 Caribbean Cup qualification campaign, scoring his first two goals against the Netherlands Antilles in a 2-1 win on 25 October 2008.

== Career statistics ==
=== International performance ===
Statistics accurate as of matches played on 16 June 2015,

Suriname national team
| Year | Apps | Goals |
|---|---|---|
| 2008 | 6 | 2 |
| Total | 6 | 2 |

==== International goals ====
Scores and results list Suriname' goal tally first.

| Goal | Date | Venue | Opponent | Score | Result | Competition |
|---|---|---|---|---|---|---|
| 1. | 25 October 2008 | Estadio Pedro Marrero, Havana, Cuba | Netherlands Antilles | 1–0 | 2–1 | 2008 Caribbean Cup qualification |
| 2. | 25 October 2008 | Estadio Pedro Marrero, Havana, Cuba | Netherlands Antilles | 2–0 | 2–1 | 2008 Caribbean Cup qualification |

== Honors ==
=== Club ===
Inter Moengotapoe

- SVB Hoofdklasse (1): 2014–15

=== Individual ===
- SVB Hoofdklasse Top Goalscorer: 2004–05
