= Clifton Sandvliet =

Surinamese footballer

Personal information
- Date of birth: August 18, 1977 (age 49)
- Place of birth: Paramaribo, Suriname
- Position: Midfielder

Senior career*
Years	Team	Apps	(Gls)
2000–2003	SNL	24	(27)
2003–2004	Transvaal	24	(10)
2004–2012	WBC	83	(57)

International career
2000–2008	Suriname	33	(12)
- * Club domestic league appearances and goals as of January 1, 2008

Clifton Sandvliet (born August 18, 1977) is a Surinamese retired professional footballer. He played for SV Transvaal, Walking Boys Company and the National Army. Sandvliet won three top scorer standings of the league SVB.

His record with the national football team of Suriname is 33 caps and 12 goals.

== Club career ==
For all of his three clubs; Sportvereniging Nationaal Leger, SV Transvaal and Walking Boys Company he has scored a massive 94 goals. He has played senior first-team club football since 2000.

== International career ==
Sandvliet played from 2000 until 2008 for the Surinamese football team. After a brief interruption from 2006, he returned to the team on June 14, 2008 during the World Cup qualifying match against Guyana. In this game he made the only goal.

== Career statistics ==
=== Club ===
season	Club	country	Competition	matches	Goals
2001/2002	SNL	Suriname	Hoofdklasse	24	27
2002/2003	SNL	Suriname	Hoofdklasse	?	?
2003/2004	SV Transvaal	Suriname	Hoofdklasse	24	10
2004/2005	Walking Boys Company	Suriname	Hoofdklasse	23	20
2005/2006	Walking Boys Company	Suriname	Hoofdklasse	25	27
2006/2007	Walking Boys Company	Suriname	Hoofdklasse	16	3
2007/2008	Walking Boys Company	Suriname	Hoofdklasse	19	7
2008/2009	Walking Boys Company	Suriname	Hoofdklasse	?	?
2009/2010	Walking Boys Company	Suriname	Hoofdklasse	?	?
2010/2011	Walking Boys Company	Suriname	Hoofdklasse	?	?
2011/2012	Walking Boys Company	Suriname	Hoofdklasse	?	?
Updated to June 21, 2009			Total	131	94

=== International ===
Appearances and goals by national team and year
National team	Year	Apps	Goals
Suriname	2000	3	0
Suriname	2001	4	2
Suriname	2002	2	1
Suriname	2003	–	
Suriname	2004	8	4
Suriname	2005	–	
Suriname	2006	3	0
Suriname	2007	–	
Suriname	2008	13	5
Total		33	12

Scores and results list Suriname's goal tally first, score column indicates score after each Sandvliet goal.

List of international goals scored by Clifton Sandvliet
No.	Date	Venue	Opponent	Score	Result	Competition
1	8 April 2001	André Kamperveen, Paramaribo, Suriname	Aruba	3–1	3–1	2001 Caribbean Cup qualification
2	16 May 2001	Marvin Lee Stadium, Macoya, Trinidad and Tobago	Cuba	3–4	3–4	2001 Caribbean Cup
3	28 July 2002	Trinidad Stadium, Oranjestad, Aruba	Aruba	2–0	2–0	2003 CONCACAF Gold Cup qualification
4	10 January 2004	Andrè Kamperveen Stadion, Paramaribo, Suriname	Netherlands Antilles	1–1	1–1	2003 Parbo Bier Cup
5	27 March 2004	André Kamperveen Stadion, Paramaribo, Suriname	Aruba	4–1	8–1	2006 FIFA World Cup qualification
6	24 November 2004	Marvin Lee Stadium, Macoya, Trinidad and Tobago	Grenada	2–2	2–2	2005 Caribbean Cup qualification
7	26 November 2004	Manny Ramjohn Stadium, Marabella, Trinidad and Tobago	Puerto Rico	1–0	1–1	2005 Caribbean Cup qualification
8	14 June 2008	André Kamperveen Stadion, Paramaribo, Suriname	Guyana	1–0	1–0	2010 FIFA World Cup qualification
9	22 June 2008	Providence Stadium, Providence, Guyana	Guyana	2–0	2–1	2010 FIFA World Cup qualification
10	9 August 2008	Blairmont Sports Club Ground, Blairmont, Guyana	Dominica	2–1	3–1	2008 Caribbean Cup qualification
11	11 October 2008	André Kamperveem Stadion, Paramaribo, Suriname	Costa Rica	1–3	1–4	2010 FIFA World Cup qualification
12	23 October 2008	Pedro Marrero Stadium, Havana, Cuba	Barbados	1–0	2–3	2008 Caribbean Cup qualification

== Honours and awards ==
=== Club (4) ===
Walking Boys Company

- Hoofdklasse: 2005/06, 2008/09
- Suriname President's Cup: 2006, 2009
- Beker van Suriname: 2004 (Runner up)

=== Individual (12 awards) ===
- Hoofdklasse Top Scorer (2): 2001/2002, 2005/06
- Top scorer of Suriname: 9 Goals
- Most caps of Suriname: 30 Caps
- Hoofdklasse Best player (2): 2005, 2006
- Hoofdklasse Golden Shoe (5): 2002, 2003, 2004, 2005, 2006
- All-Time Scorers in Hoofdklasse since 1999 (unofficial data)
