= Ifenildo Vlijter =

Surinamese footballer

Personal information
- Full name: Ifenildo Vlijter
- Date of birth: November 17, 1974 (age 51)
- Place of birth: Paramaribo, Suriname
- Position: Forward

Senior career*
Years	Team	Apps	(Gls)
1999–2000	House of Billiards		
2000–2001	Robinhood		
2001–2003	House of Billiards		
2003–2005	Inter Moengotapoe		
2005–2007	Royal '95		
2007–2008	Robinhood		(17)

International career^{‡}
2000–2006	Suriname	7	(0)
- * Club domestic league appearances and goals as of October 9, 2015 ‡ National team caps and goals as of October 9, 2015

Ifenildo Vlijter (born November 17, 1974) is a retired Surinamese footballer who played as a forward for House of Billiards, Robinhood, Inter Moengotapoe and Royal '95 in the Hoofdklasse, and for the Suriname national team.

== Club career ==
Vlijter began his career in the 1999–2000 Hoofdklasse season, playing for House of Billiards in Paramaribo finishing his first season as the league's joint top goalscorer together with Benny Kejansi (of Inter Moengotapoe) finishing with 24 goals each. The following year he transferred to S.V. Robinhood. Returning to House of Billiards where he remained for two seasons before transferring to Inter Moengotapoe for two seasons, followed by two seasons with Royal '95. In 2007, he returned to Robinhood where he would end his last season as a player as league top scorer once more with 17 goals scored.

== International career ==
Vlijter has played for the Suriname national team, having made his debut in 2000. He has made 7 official appearances in qualifying campaigns for the FIFA World Cup, CONCACAF Gold Cup and the Caribbean Cup.

== Honors ==
=== Individual ===
- SVB Hoofdklasse Top Goalscorer (2): 1999–00, 2007–08
