= 2012–13 SVB Hoofdklasse =

Hoofdklasse
- Season: 2012–13
- Champions: Inter Moengotapoe
- Top goalscorer: (Suriname) Galgyto Talea (18 goals)

The 2012–13 Surinamese Hoofdklasse was the 80th season of the SVB Hoofdklasse, the highest football league competition of Suriname. The season began in October 2012, and finished in June 2013.

== League table ==
=== Regular season stage ===
Pos	Team	Pld	W	D	L	GF	GA	GD	Pts	Qualification or relegation
1	Inter Moengotapoe (C)	18	14	3	1	49	13	+36	45	Qualification for CFU Club Championship
2	Notch	18	11	3	4	35	21	+14	36	
3	Leo Victor	18	9	3	6	34	21	+13	30	
4	Excelsior	18	8	3	7	32	36	−4	27	
5	Transvaal	18	8	2	8	33	32	+1	26	
6	WBC	18	8	3	7	40	32	+8	24	3 points deducted (for fielding an ineligible player)
7	Boskamp	18	6	1	11	18	34	−16	19	
8	Robinhood	18	5	3	10	18	29	−11	18	
9	SNL	18	5	2	11	33	40	−7	17	Relegation playoff
10	Randjiet Boys	18	3	3	12	16	50	−34	12	Relegation to SVB Eerste Klasse

Source: RSSSF
