= André Kamperveen =

Surinamese footballer and politician

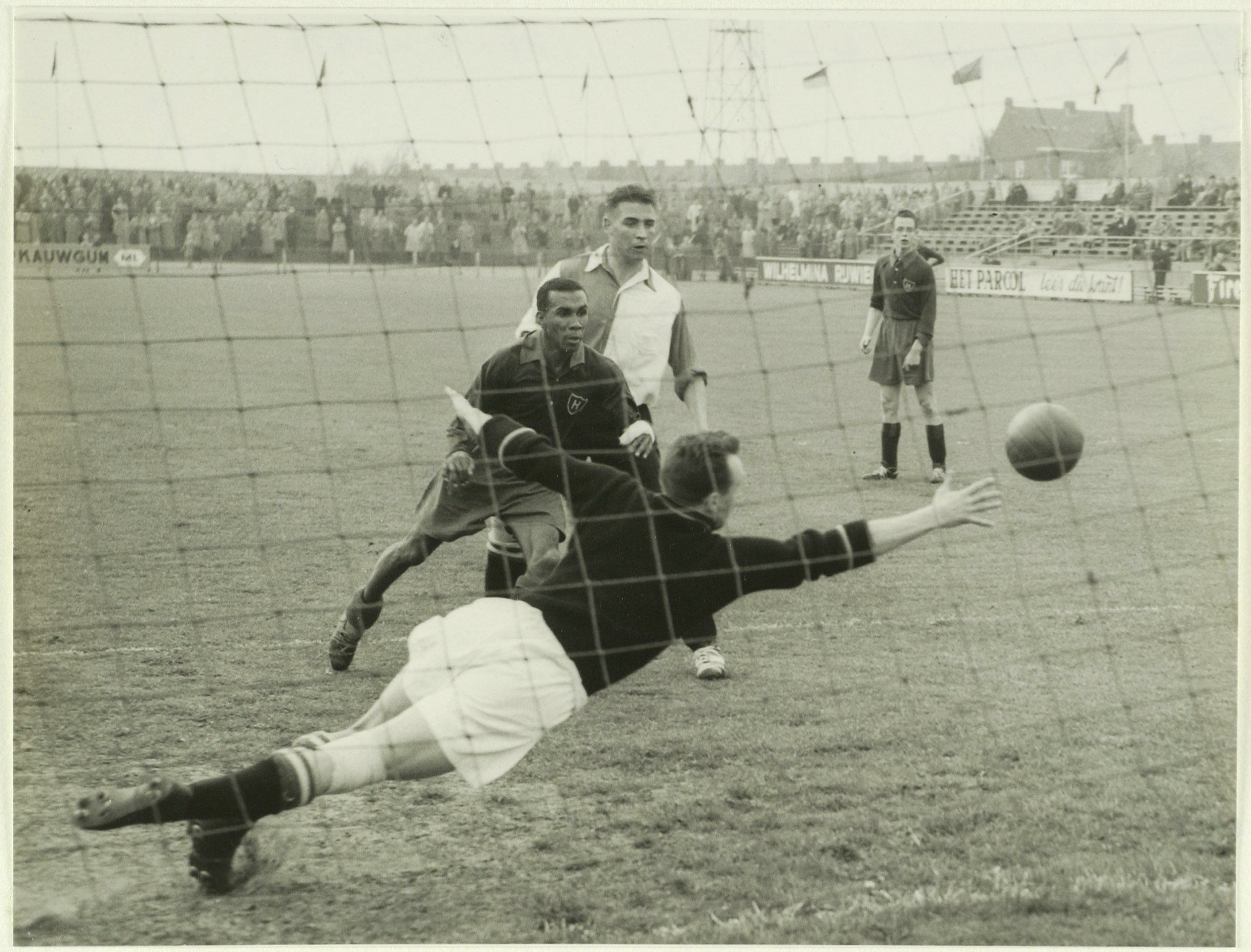
- Kamperveen scores (1955)
- Born: Rudi André Kamperveen; 27 September 1924; Paramaribo, Surinam
- Died: 8 December 1982 (aged 58); Fort Zeelandia, Paramaribo, Suriname
- Occupations: Footballer; Basketball player; Judoka; Sports administrator; Politician; Businessman; Broadcaster; Journalist; Minister; Entrepreneur
- Political party: Progressive National Party
- Spouse: Lea van Leuvenum (m. 1980–1982)
Association football career
- Position: Forward
Senior career*
Years	Team	Apps	(Gls)
1945–1948	MVV	?	(?)
1950–1951	Paysandu	?	(?)
1954–1957	HFC Haarlem	?	(?)
Total		?	(?)
International career
1945–1954	Suriname	?	(8)
Managerial career
- 1958–1962: Suriname
- 1958–1964: SV Transvaal
- * Club domestic league appearances and goals
- Basketball career
- Position: Point guard

Career history
- 1945–1948: Nationaal Leger

Rudi André Kamperveen (27 September 1924 – 8 December 1982) was a Surinamese football player, sports administrator, politician and businessman.

During his playing career, the centre forward represented and captained the Suriname national football team in the 1940s. He played professionally in Brazil (Paysandu Sport Club) and Netherlands during his playing career, becoming the first Surinamese player to play professionally in the Netherlands in the process while plying his trade for HFC Haarlem.

After his playing career he became Minister for Sport in Suriname. He also helped establish the Caribbean Football Union which was formed in 1978 and he was selected as the union's first President. He was also a vice-president of FIFA.

He was killed in 1982 as part of the December murders. His body reportedly showed injuries to the jaw and a swollen face, 18 bullet wounds in the chest, a shot wound in the right temple, a fractured femur and a fractured arm.

He was inducted into the CONCACAF hall of fame. The André Kamperveen Stadion is named in his honour.

== Early life ==
Known as "Suriname's Man of the People", Kamperveen or 'Ampie' as he was more commonly called was born 27 September 1924 in Paramaribo, Surinam. Having pursued athletics, basketball, boxing and judo, football was his first love and the sport he was best at. He started playing as an 11-year-old on the Dr. Sophie Redmond Straat and signs of potential were noticeable at an early age. In 1942 he was called up for military service at the age of 18.

== Association football career ==
=== Club career ===
==== MVV ====
Kamperveen joined the military club MVV during his service, competing in the Hoofdklasse, the top flight of football in Suriname. He was a crowd favorite, scoring many goals and helping MVV to win a national championship in 1948.

==== Paysandu SC ====
In 1950, he joined Paysandu Sport Club from Belém, Brazil where he signed on a 1-year contract. He became the first professional football player from Suriname, joining a club that was used to winning, this proved to be a big change for Kamperveen, where he learned Brazilian Portuguese in order to communicate with his teammates.

In December 1952 a Caribbean All-Stars team came to Suriname to play exhibition matches at the Cultuurtuinlaan. Kamperveen was called up to play for the Caribbean All-Star team together with Michel Kruin and Humphrey Mijnals from Suriname. He scored two goals in the opening match for the Caribbean All-Stars against the Suriname national team in a 2–2 draw. Two more matches were played against the national team, which ended in a draw and a loss for the All-Stars, while two additional matches played were lost to S.V. Robinhood and S.V. Voorwaarts. It is worth mentioning that Kamperveen had already played for the Suriname national team prior to being called up for the Caribbean regional team.

==== HFC Haarlem ====
In 1954, Kamperveen relocated to the Netherlands to study at the CIOS in Overveen. Aside from football he took classes in boxing, judo, jiu-jitsu and basketball. After completion of his studies he attended the Sporthochschule in Cologne, West Germany. During his period in the Netherlands he signed with HFC Haarlem competing in the Netherlands Football League Championship and in the KNVB Cup and becoming the first Surinamese player to compete in the Netherlands. He scored two goals against Racing Club Heemstede on 19 August 1956 in a 2–1 win in the first round of the KNVB Cup. Haarlem were however eliminated in the second round by Alkmaar '54. That same year, Kamperveen graduated with an A-level diploma from the KNVB, the highest level diploma issued by the Dutch governing body of football. At the end of the season he returned to Suriname.

=== International career ===
==== Suriname ====
Kamperveen played for the Suriname national team. He made his debut in 1945 at the age of 21. Playing as a center forward, he earned the captain armband in his first year with the team. In 1946 the national team travelled to Willemstad, Curaçao to participate in a tournament with Curaçao, Aruba and Colombia and Dutch club Feyenoord. Suriname were able to draw 1–1 with Colombia in their opening match, losing to Curaçao 6–0, and suffering record loses to Aruba and Feyenoord (8–1). The tournament was won by Feyenoord. On 2 February 1947 he scored four goals in a 9–0 win over French Guiana, the record highest win recorded by the Suriname national team.

In July 1948, Kamperveen travelled to the Netherlands with the Suriname national team, the team's first ever trip to Europe. Kamperveen scored a goal in the opening match, which saw the national team play Ajax at the De Meer Stadion ending in a 2–2 draw. Additional games were played against Feyenoord, Tilburg XI, DFC and Den Haag XI. Kamperveen scored four goals on the tour in total.

In 1951, the Suriname national team played a series of friendly matches against Náutico from Recife, Brazil. Kamperveen scored once in two matches played. On 1 August 1954 the Netherlands played Suriname at the newly built National Stadion in Paramaribo. Kamperveen played the full match in the 4–3 loss at home. Two days later the two teams played again ending in 2–0 loss to the Netherlands for Suriname. In 1957 he played in a friendly match for the national team against visiting SK Rapid Wien from Austria winning the match 3–1 at home.

=== Managerial career ===
==== Suriname ====
In 1958, Kamperveen took over as manager of the Suriname national team. On 30 July 1958 the national team suffered its biggest loss under Kamperveen, when they were defeated 9–2 by the Netherlands at the National Stadion. He managed the team in their first ever World Cup qualifications ahead of the 1962 FIFA World Cup in Chile.

==== SV Transvaal ====
He took over the managerial position at S.V. Transvaal in 1958 as well, leading the team to the national championship in the Hoofdklasse in 1962.

=== Career statistics ===
==== International goals ====
Scores and results list Suriname' goal tally first.

Goal	Date	Venue	Opponent	Score	Result	Competition
1.	2 February 1947	Cultuurtuinlaan, Paramaribo, Suriname	French Guiana	2–0	9–0	International friendly
2.	2 February 1947	Cultuurtuinlaan, Paramaribo, Suriname	French Guiana	3–0	9–0	International friendly
3.	2 February 1947	Cultuurtuinlaan, Paramaribo, Suriname	French Guiana	6–0	9–0	International friendly
4.	2 February 1947	Cultuurtuinlaan, Paramaribo, Suriname	French Guiana	8–0	9–0	International friendly
5.	29 August 1953	National Stadion, Paramaribo, Suriname	(Netherlands) Aruba	1–0	3–3	International friendly
6.	1 September 1953	National Stadion, Paramaribo, Suriname	(Netherlands) Aruba	1–1	3–3	International friendly
7.	1 September 1953	National Stadion, Paramaribo, Suriname	(Netherlands) Aruba	2–1	3–3	International friendly
8.	1 September 1953	National Stadion, Paramaribo, Suriname	(Netherlands) Aruba	3–3	3–3	International friendly

=== Honours ===
==== Player ====
MVV

- Hoofdklasse: 1948

==== Manager ====
SV Transvaal

- Hoofdklasse: 1962

==== Individual ====
- SVB Golden ball award: 1960

== Basketball career ==
Kamperveen played many sports apart from football. Basketball was one of his favorites, having joined the basketball team of the Surinamese military after enlisting. Basketball had arrived in Suriname in 1941 when the U.S. military arrived on November 24th. Games were organized between teams of the battalions of both militaries and local community teams. The local basketball teams 'Surinam' and 'Chung Fa Foei Kon', a Chinese basketball club from Suriname and one of the strongest in the sports national history, were among the first teams to register in the country. Kamperveen played point guard for the basketball team of the Nationaal Leger.

The Surinamese Basketball Association was founded in 1947 with Kamperveen competing in the first official season. Kamperveen also played for the Suriname national basketball team at the same time that he was playing for the national football team.

29 November 1957 was the first time the national basketball team played inside an arena. The game was between the national teams of Suriname and Trinidad and Tobago. Kamperveen officiated the game which ended in an 81–78 loss to Trinidad and Tobago for Suriname.

== Judo career ==
Kamperveen became the first black belt in the history of judo in Suriname. While studying in the Netherlands at CIOS, Kamperveen took up judo graduating to 2nd dan in 1957. On 3 May 1957 Kamperveen opened the first dojo in Paramaribo, known as Kodokan on the Mgr. Wulfingstraat. Named after the original Kodokan in Tokyo, Japan, the Kodokan dojo is of great importance to the development of the practice in Suriname, organizing the first tournaments, it is the dojo where judoka Eddy Murray was given his first belts. Murray would go on to play a much bigger role in the Sport.

In 1964, Kamperveen made an attempt at founding the first national judo/jiu-jitsu association in Suriname. Although the attempt failed it did serve to further promote judo in the outlying districts of Suriname. That year he graduated judoka in Nieuw Nickerie during half time of a football match as manager of S.V. Transvaal. In 1968, he founded the Surinamese Judo Association, becoming the first chairman of the organization.

== Broadcasting and Journalism ==
On 15 December 1950 the first edition of 'Sport Ontspannings Kroniek' (also known as SOK) was published as a weekly sports newspaper. Although not the first sports paper in Suriname, the previous publication folded after only two years in existence. Kamperveen and Jules Defares were the directors of the new paper. Initially a weekly, it was eventually published twice a week, becoming a weekly once more by 1955. Kamperveen contributed a great deal to sports journalism in Suriname. He was heavily involved in some of the earliest live radio broadcasting of football matches as well, working with Surinamese radio stations Rapar, Apintie and SRS. He founded the VSJS (Vereniging van Sportjournalisten in Suriname, meaning 'Association of Sports journalists in Suriname'), becoming the first chairman of the organization in 1963.

On 20 October 1966 the first Surinamese television station went on air, the Surinaamse Televisie Stichting (STVS), and two years later, Kamperveen produced the first weekly sports show in Suriname for the station called 'Sportrevue'.

=== Radio ABC ===
On 6 December 1975 Kamperveen's dream, to one day own his own radio station, finally came true. Ampies Broadcasting Corporation Suriname, commonly known as ABC, the lovestation was born. After years of working for Apintie, Kamperveen finally owned his own station. Both his sons, Johnny and Henk Kamperveen joined him to work at the station, Johnny as a host, and Henk as a director. Radio ABC is a popular station in Suriname, blending news, activities, sports, humor and a lot of music.

== Administrative roles in Sports ==
Kamperveen held many administrative roles in regards to recreation, youth and sports throughout his entrepreneurial career. In 1957 he graduated with an A-level diploma from the Royal Dutch Football Association (KNVB), having completed studies at the CIOS and attending the Sportshochschule in West Germany. After becoming a board member of the Surinamese Football Association, he held various positions within the board of the CONCACAF, the continental governing body for association football in North America, Central America and the Caribbean. He also helped form the Caribbean Football Union becoming the first president of the organization, and was elected vice-president of FIFA, the global governing body for football.

Administrative positions held over the years include:

- In 1964 Kamperveen became a board member of the Surinamese Football Association.
- In 1968, he founded the Surinamese Judo Association, becoming the first chairman of the organization.
- In 1973, he was made a member of the CONCACAF disciplinary committee during the association meeting in Mexico.
- In 1974, he organized the country's first national billiards tournaments, setting a precedent of the sport.
- In 1975 on 6 August he became a board member of CONCACAF holding a chair on the board for one year.
- In 1976, he became the honorary chairman of the Association of Sports journalists in Suriname. That same year he became vice-president of FIFA.
- In 1978 on 27 January the Caribbean Football Union (CFU) was founded with Kamperveen becoming the first president of the organization.
- In 1980 on 1 March he became the Minister of Culture, Youth and Sports in Suriname. On 6 June of the same year he became a board member of CONCACAF once more, holding a chair on the board for two years until his untimely death.
- In 1982, he stepped down as Minister of Culture, Youth and Sports due to disagreements over the Sergeant's Coup.

That year Kamperveen as vice-president of FIFA appeared along the center circle at the Santiago Bernabéu Stadium in Madrid, Spain as king Juan Carlos I of Spain kicked off the 1982 FIFA World Cup opening ceremony. Kamperveen would also witness the beginning of Surinamese compatriots Frank Rijkaard and Ruud Gullit's International career with the Netherlands in the buildup to the tournament before losing his life in the December murders. He would not survive to witness the rise and influence of Surinamese footballers in Dutch football throughout the eighties and nineties.

== Personal life ==
Kamperveen is the father of three children from his first marriage. Two sons, Johnny and Henk, and a daughter Lilian. In 1976 his sons joined him at Radio ABC, Johnny became a popular radio host, while Henk became a director of the station. He was married to Lea van Leuvenum, his second wife. They were married in 1980 in New York City following his divorce from his previous marriage, they had no children together.

== Political activities ==
Following the 1980 Surinamese coup d'état, Kamperveen was appointed Minister of Culture, Youth and Sports under Minister-president Henk Chin A Sen. Due to disagreements over the political direction of the National Military Council (NMR), he denounced his position and became vocal about his opposition through writing and on live radio on his own ABC station. Kamperveen believed the country should head in a more democratic direction, while Dési Bouterse wanted a military dictatorship.

== Death ==
On 7 December 1982 at 2:00 am, he and his wife were interrupted from their sleep by soldiers of Dési Bouterse, the then dictator of Suriname. His guard dogs were shot and Kamperveen was taken away to Fort Zeelandia, where he and 14 other men who had voiced opposition to the military regime were heard as "suspects in a trial" by Bouterse and other sergeants in a self-appointed court. After these "hearings" they were tortured and shot dead. The circumstances have not yet become completely clear; on 10 December 1982, Bouterse claimed on national television that all of the detainees had been shot dead "in an attempt to flee". That day his Wife went to the hospital to identify the body. He had sustained injuries to the jaw and a swollen face, 18 bullet wounds in the chest, a shot wound in the right temple, a fractured femur and a fractured arm.

His son Johnny had initially been reported as one of the victims of the murders. He was however able to escape abduction and together with other family members fled to the Netherlands. The ABC Radio building had been torched to the ground and completely destroyed on the night of the abduction as well. Kamperveen's funeral was on 13 December 1982, buried at the Annette's Hof cemetery in Paramaribo, his funeral attracted thousands of people and was led by vicar Rudi Polanen of the Moravian Church.

== Posthumous ==
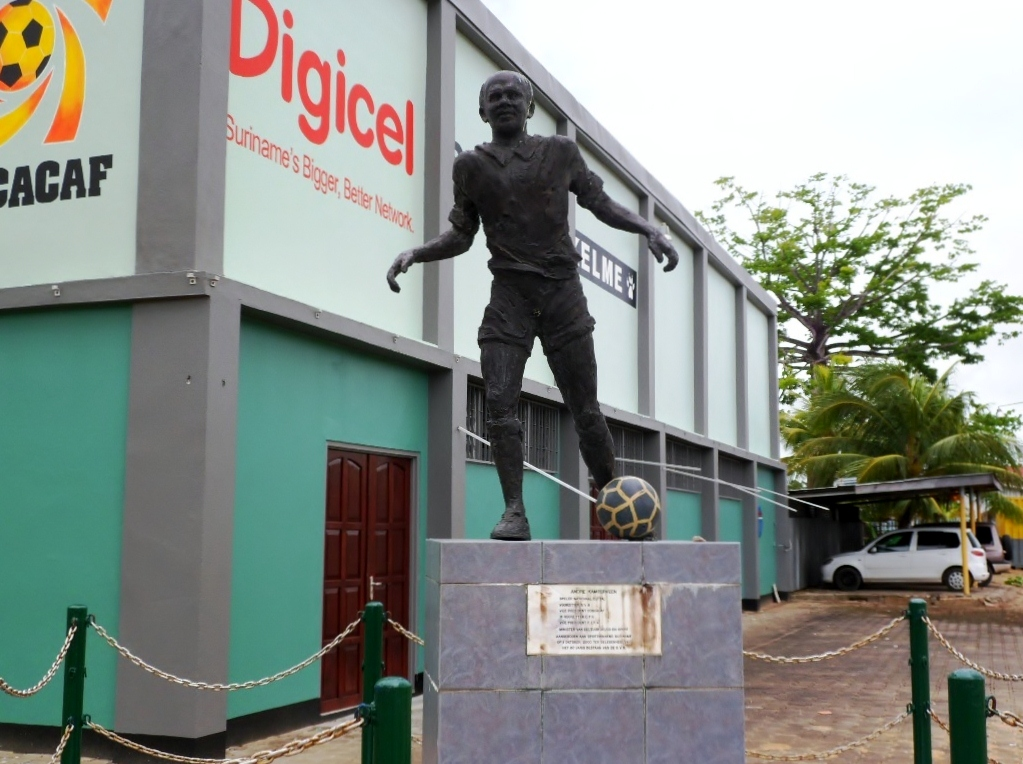
Bronze statue of André Kamperveen at the André Kamperveen Stadion in Paramaribo.

The Kamperveen family have long been involved with the prosecution of Bouterse, working with human rights organization and consulting with the United Nations Human Rights Committee in 1983 along with other victim families. The December murders trial - Suriname's trial of the century - commenced on 30 November 2007. This trial ended 12 years later, on 29 November 2019 with the sentencing of main multiple murder suspect Desi Bouterse to 20 years imprisonment. Judge Valstein-Montor motivated that `Bouterse had violated the right to life, by ordering the killings after extensive torture of the detained men. Valstein-Montnor: "The brutal murders enhanced the fear already omnipresent in 1982 Suriname". Bouterse's lawyer Irvin Kanhai objected to judgment a week after, meaning that he and his client object to the verdict by Court Martial, the body of 3 judges in the trial. Because of this object to judgement, Bouterse has to testify before court before the end of January 2020. If he fails to do so, he will be incarcerated. At the time of the murders, Bouterse was leading the so-called 'Blood Committee', a death squad. Judges in Suriname's 'court case of the century' made known on Friday 30 November 2019, the day that Bouterse and others were sentenced. Together with military sergeants Paul Bhagwandas and Roy Horb Bouterse decided over life and death at Fort Zeelandia, where 15 critics of Bouterse's military regime were killed by Bouterse's order, court findings showed. The murder victims were unarmed and completely defenseless, according to court findings. Dési Bouterse has long denied guilt and only accepted political responsibility for the murders as of 2007. In April 2012, Bouterse adjusted an existing 1992 'Amnesty law', granting all suspects in the December murder case amnesty. A few weeks later, on 12 May, Court Martial paused the trial because of this. On 29 June 2016, Public Prosecution requested Court Martial to end the Murder Trial upon request by the main murder suspect, president Bouterse himself. According to the main suspect in the trial, the state's security would be in danger in case of continuation of the court case. Bouterse made use of article 148 of Suriname's constitution. This order was made one day before the public prosecutor would make known his penalty requirement against main suspect Desi Bouterse. Ultimately, on 30 January 2017, Court Martial ordered for the continuation of the December murders trial. They found no issue in Bouterse's argument that 'state safety' would be in danger in case of continuation of the court case. On 28 June 2017, Bouterse heard his penalty requirement - 20 years jailtime - from Public Prosecution.

As of December 2018 the hearings in the court cases regarding the military men involved in the murders, were closed. From the end of 2018 into the following year, 2019, the lawsuit of the murder suspects who were tried as citizens because they had been government officials at the time of the murders. For instance former ministers John Hardjoprajitno and Harvey Naarendorp were tried in this manner, but with the judicial investigation in the December murder trial, it became clear that undeniably Bouterse is the main one responsible for the killings. He was the one whom decided over life and death, according to court findings. The investigation on the murders commenced in the year 2000 up until 2007. Suriname's 'trial of the century' addressed as such, by than minister of Justice and Police Chan Santokhi, back in 2007 has proven to indeed as Santokhi prophesied in an interview with Radio Netherlands Worldwide, that the multiple murder trial would function as 'testcase for the democratic state of law' in Suriname". This has proven indeed to be the case in the past 12 years. The outcome is that the main suspect, Desi Bouterse, 2 times president in row, has been convicted while being head of State. This shows that no one in this relatively young democracy, is above the law. Suriname is now known as the country where the main suspect in a multiple murder case, got convicted. In 1993, Johnny and Henk returned to Paramaribo to rebuild the ABC Radio station, and after 11 years of absence, the love station was back on air in Suriname. In 2003, Johnny died from a viral infection at his home after years as a host on his father's station.

In 1988, the National Stadium in Paramaribo was renamed the André Kamperveen Stadion to commemorate the stadiums 35th Anniversary, and on 1 October 2000 a bronze statue of Kamperveen was erected outside the stadium to commemorate the Surinamese Football Association's 80th Anniversary.
