= Surinaamse Brouwerij =

Surinamese beer producer

Coordinates: 05°48′12″N 55°10′53″W

- Location: Paramaribo, Suriname
- Opened: 1954
- Parent: Heineken International
- Website: Parbo Bier

Surinaamse Brouwerij (English: "Surinamese Brewery") is the primary beer producer in Suriname. The brewery produces Parbo Bier and Parbo Power Stout.

== History ==
The brewery was founded in 1954 in the Beekhuizen neighborhood of Paramaribo by two brothers, Pieter ("Piet") and Arthur ("Thuur") Dumoleyn, post-war immigrant brewers from the Dutch province of Zeeland, with support from the Amsterdam-based Amstel Brewery (acquired in 1968 by Heineken). Suriname was at the time still a Dutch colony. The brewery was officially opened in October 1955, by Prince Bernhard of the Netherlands. It was formerly part of Amstel Brewery.

== Parbo Bier ==
Parbo Bier is a 5% vol Surinamese beer. The basis of Parbo Beer includes pale malt that is partially complemented by specially grown rice, water and hops. In Suriname, Parbo Beer has 80% of the market share. Production in the early years was 15,000 hectoliters per year and grew to 120,000 hectoliters by 1973. Since 2003, production has grown to 150,000 hectoliters. Parbo Beer is exported to French Guiana, Guyana, Aruba and the Netherlands.

== Advertising campaigns ==
Parbo Bier beermat, circa 1975

In the past, the brewery used the Dutch rhyming advertising slogan Bierplezier: Parbo Bier (Beer pleasure: Parbo Beer). Present day slogans are in Sranantongo: Tru Sranan Prisiri (Real Surinamese Pleasure) and Parbo Biri: dat n'a biri (Parbo Beer: that's the beer).
