= 2009 Suriname President's Cup =

WBC	Inter Moengotapoe
3	0
- Date: 4 October 2009
- Venue: Andre Kamperveen Stadion, Paramaribo
- Referee: Enrico Wijngaarde (Suriname)

The 2009 Suriname President's Cup was won by WBC who beat Inter Moengotapoe 3–0 in the final on 4 October 2009.

== Match details ==
4 October 2009

WBC	3 – 0	Inter MT
Sandvliet 35'; Kempenaar 54'; Aroepa 60'	Report	Misiedjan (red card); Vlijter (red card)

Andre Kamperveen Stadion, Paramaribo
Attendance: ?
Referee: Enrico Wijngaarde (Suriname)

== Gallery ==
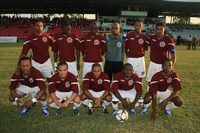
WBC President's Cup Winner
