= 2019–20 SVB Eerste Divisie =

SVB Eerste Divisie
- Season: 2019–20
- Champions: None
- Relegated: None
- Caribbean Club Shield: Inter Moengotapoe

The 2019–20 SVB Eerste Divisie was the 87th season of the SVB Eerste Divisie, the top division football competition in Suriname. The season began on 6 December 2019 and prematurely ended on 13 March 2020 due to concerns surrounding the COVID-19 pandemic, ultimately for the season to be abandon and null by the Surinamese Football Association. At the time of abandonment, Inter Moengotapoe led the league in points, and qualified for the 2021 Caribbean Club Shield.

== Clubs ==
=== Clubs that did not register for the season ===
Two clubs that were not relegated the previous season did not register for the 2019–20 season. This included Happy Boys and WBC.

== Table ==
Table at abandonment of the league.

1.Inter Moengotapoe           11   8  3  0  27- 9  27       [C]
2.Robinhood                   11   8  1  2  29-11  25
3.Notch                       11   6  2  3  26-21  20
4.Leo Victor                  11   6  2  3  20-17  20
5.Broki                       10   5  3  2  26-16  18
6.Transvaal                   11   5  3  3  20-19  18
7.PVV                         10   5  2  3  16-11  17
8.Bintang Lair                11   5  1  5  20-22  16       [P]
9.West United                 11   3  5  3  14-13  14
10.SNL                        12   3  2  7  12-28  11
11.Voorwaarts                 11   2  4  5  22-19  10
12.ACoconut                   10   1  3  6  12-24   6
13.Inter Wanica               11   1  3  7  13-28   6       [*]
-----------------------------------------------------
14.Santos                     11   0  2  9  16-35   2
