= Suriname President's Cup =

Football match in Suriname

- Founded: 1993
- Region: Suriname
- Teams: 2
- Current champions: Inter Moengotapoe (7th title)
- Most championships: Robinhood (7 titles); Inter Moengotapoe (7 titles)

The Suriname President's Cup is an association football super cup competition organized by the Surinamese Football Association. The match puts the winners of the SVB Eerste Divisie and the SVB Cup against each other.

== History ==
The tournament began in the 1993 season. The first champion was PVV. In 2018, SV Robinhood won the trophy for the seventh time, becoming the most successful club in the competition's history. Inter Moengotapoe matched the record in 2019.

== Past finals ==
Season	Winner	Scorers	Result	Runner-up	Scorers	Venue	Attendance
1993	PVV		2–1	Transvaal			
1994	Robinhood			Leo Victor			
1995	Robinhood		2–0	Coronie Boys			
1996	Robinhood		1–0	Transvaal			
1997	Transvaal		1–1 (pen)	Voorwaarts			
1998	Not held						
1999	Robinhood		3–2	Transvaal			
2000	Not held						
2001	Robinhood		3–2	Transvaal			
2002	Voorwaarts		2–1	Transvaal			
2003	Leo Victor		4–2	FCS Nacional			
2004	WBC		5–0	Super Red Eagles			
2005	FCS Nacional		1–0	Robinhood			
2006	WBC		4–2	Robinhood			
2007	Inter Moengotapoe		4–2	Robinhood			
2008	Transvaal		3–0	Inter Moengotapoe			
2009	WBC	Sandvliet 35' (pen); Kempenaar 54'; Aroepa 60'	3–0	Inter Moengotapoe		Andre Kamperveen Stadion	
2010	Inter Moengotapoe		1–0	Excelsior			
2011	Inter Moengotapoe		2–2 ns (5–4)	Notch			
2012	Inter Moengotapoe		3-2	Robinhood			
2013	Inter Moengotapoe		3-1	WBC			
2014	Leo Victor		1–1 (5–3 pen.)	Inter Moengotapoe			
2015	Nishan 42	da Silva 70'	1–0	Inter Moengotapoe		Andre Kamperveen Stadion	1800
2016	Robinhood	Djimisie 35' (pen) Rozenblad 88'; Fer 94'	3–1	Inter Moengotapoe	Vallei 14' (pen)	Andre Kamperveen Stadion	3000
2017	Inter Moengotapoe		4–2	Papatam			
2018	Robinhood		4–0	West United			
2019	Inter Moengotapoe		2–0	Flora			
2023	Robinhood	Rigters 100'; Singodikromo 118', 119'	3–0 (aet)	Inter Moengotapoe		Franklin Essed Stadion	3,500

=== Number of titles ===
	Club	# Wins	Winning years
1	Robinhood	7	1994, 1995, 1996, 1999, 2001, 2016, 2018, 2023
1	Inter Moengotapoe	7	2007, 2010, 2011, 2012, 2013, 2017, 2019
3	WBC	3	2004, 2006, 2009
4	Transvaal	2	1997, 2008
4	Leo Victor	2	2003, 2014
6	FCS Nacional	1	2005
6	Voorwaarts	1	2002
6	PVV	1	1993
6	Nishan 42	1	2015
