= S.V. Arsenal =

Surinamese football club

Arsenal
- Full name: Sport Vereniging Arsenal
- Nickname: Gunners
- Founded: 13 June 1937; 89 years ago
- Ground: Mr. Bronsplein, Paramaribo, Suriname
- League: Domburg Sportbond League
- 2015/16: 3rd
Home colours	Away colours

Sport Vereniging Arsenal (English: Sports Union Arsenal) commonly abbreviated as S.V. Arsenal, is a Surinamese football club based in Nieuw Amsterdam that played in the Surinamese Hoofdklasse, the highest level of football in Suriname. They play their home games on the Mr. Bronsplein in Paramaribo. Named after the English football club Arsenal, the club was founded on 13 June 1937, as a split-off from Cicerone and won the National championship twice, in the 1938–39 and the 1939–40 season.

The club currently compete in the Domburg Sportbond (DSB) league, one of the amateur district leagues in Suriname.

== Honours ==
- Hoofdklasse

Champions (2):1938–39, 1939–40
