= Renzo Akrosie =

Surinamese footballer (born 1996)

Personal information
- Full name: Lorenzo Akrosie
- Date of birth: 12 September 1996 (age 30)
- Place of birth: Paramaribo, Suriname
- Height: 1.60 m (5 ft 3 in)
- Position: Midfielder

Team information
- Current team: PVV

Senior career*
Years	Team	Apps	(Gls)
2015–2019	SNL		
2019–	PVV		

International career
2018–2019	Suriname	5	(0)
- * Club domestic league appearances and goals

Lorenzo "Renzo" Akrosie (born 12 September 1996) is a Surinamese professional footballer who plays as a midfielder for Suriname Major League club PVV.

== Club career ==
During the 2018–19 season with Sportvereniging Nationaal Leger (known as SNL), Akrosie scored a total of 33 goals.

In 2019, after leaving SNL, Akrosie joined PVV.

== International career ==
Akrosie's debut for Suriname came in a 4–0 friendly win against French Guiana on 18 August 2018.
