= Royal '95 =

Surinamese football club

- Full name: Royal '95
- Ground: Dr. Ir. Franklin Essed Stadion; Paramaribo
- Capacity: 3,000
- League: Eerste Klasse

Royal '95 is a Surinamese football club based in Paramaribo. The club presently competes in the Eerste Klasse, the 2nd tier of Surinamese football.

In the 2004–05 SVB Hoofdklasse season, Cleven Wanabo finished as the league top goal scorer with 24 goals scored while playing for Royal '95.

== Performance in CONCACAF competitions ==
- 2005 CFU Club Championship

First round v. (Netherlands Antilles) Victory Boys – 0:0, 1:3
