= Ivanildo Rozenblad =

Surinamese footballer (1996–2021)

Ivanildo Rozenbald
Personal information
- Date of birth: 16 May 1996
- Place of birth: Paramaribo, Suriname
- Date of death: 12 May 2021 (aged 24)
- Place of death: Totness, Coronie District, Suriname
- Height: 1.72 m (5 ft 8 in)
- Position: Forward

Senior career*
Years	Team	Apps	(Gls)
2015–2019	S.V. Robinhood		

International career
2016–2018	Suriname	5	(2)
- * Club domestic league appearances and goals

Ivanildo Rozenblad (16 May 1996 – 12 May 2021) was a Surinamese footballer who played as a forward for S.V. Robinhood and the Suriname national team.

== Career ==
Playing for S.V. Robinhood, he scored 20 league goals in the 2016–17 season and 22 goals in 2017–18. The latter season he helped win the double, having also been cup champion in 2016.

Rozenblad came to prominence during the 2016 match against Guyana. The game was deadlocked 1–1. During the 30 minutes extra time, Rozenblad managed to secure a decisive victory.

== Death ==
The career of Rozenblad started promising. Henk Fraser, trainer of Sparta Rotterdam, disclosed in an interview that Rozenblad was one of the two players he wanted to see in action during his visit to Suriname. Rozenblad had to stop playing football due to heart disease. On 12 May 2021, it was confirmed that he had died while playing football in Coronie. The cause of death has not yet been disclosed.

== Career statistics ==
Scores and results list Suriname's goal tally first, score column indicates score after each Rozenblad goal.

List of international goals scored by Ivanildo Rozenblad
No.	Date	Venue	Opponent	Score	Result	Competition
1	8 October 2016	André Kamperveen Stadion, Paramaribo, Suriname	Guyana	3–1	3–2	2017 Caribbean Cup qualification
2	4 January 2017	Ato Boldon Stadium, Couva, Trinidad and Tobago	Trinidad and Tobago	2–1	2–1	2017 CONCACAF Gold Cup qualification
