= Gregory Rigters =

Surinamese footballer

Personal information
- Full name: Gregory Walter Rigters
- Date of birth: 26 February 1985
- Place of birth: Paramaribo, Suriname
- Date of death: 4 December 2017 (aged 32)
- Place of death: Paramaribo, Suriname
- Position: Forward

Senior career*
Years	Team	Apps	(Gls)
2007–2009	Voorwaarts		
2009–2010	The Brothers		
2010–2013	Voorwaarts		
2013–2017	WBC	56	(40)

International career^{‡}
2009–2015	Suriname	7	(1)
- * Club domestic league appearances and goals as of 9 October 2015 ‡ National team caps and goals as of 9 October 2015

Gregory Walter Rigters (26 February 1985 – 4 December 2017) was a Surinamese footballer.

Rigters last played as a forward for Walking Boyz Company in the Hoofdklasse, and for the Suriname national team. He died following a traffic collision on 4 December 2017.

== Career ==
Rigters began his career in the 2007–08 SVB Hoofdklasse, playing for SV Voorwaarts. After two seasons he transferred to SV The Brothers returning to his former club after two seasons. In 2013, he transferred to Walking Boyz Company finishing his first season at his new club as the league top goal scorer with 16 goals, Rigters would finish as the league's top goal scorer once more with 20 goals scored the following season.

== International career ==
Rigters played for the Suriname national team having made his debut on 22 April 2009 in a friendly match against French Guiana which ended in a 0–0 draw. He scored his only goal for the national team on 30 April 2015 in a friendly match against Guyana.
