= SVB Eerste Divisie =

Association football league in Suriname

Eerste Divisie
- Founded: 1914; 112 years ago
- First season: 1914–15
- Country: Suriname
- Confederation: CONCACAF
- Number of clubs: 11
- Level on pyramid: 1 (1914–2024); 2 (2024–)
- Promotion to: Major League
- Relegation to: Lidbondentoernooi
- Domestic cup(s): Beker van Suriname; Suriname President's Cup
- Current champions: SV Robinhood (2023)
- Most championships: Robinhood (26 titles)
- Current: 2024

The SVB Eerste Divisie is the second highest football championship for clubs run by the Surinaamse Voetbal Bond. The league currently comprises twelve teams and operates a system of promotion and relegation. Seasons run from November to June, with each team playing 30 games in the regular season. The league was previously known as the Hoofdklasse but was rebranded as the Topklasse for the 2016–17 season, before being renamed the Eerste Divisie starting in the 2017–18 season. In 2024, the SVB introduced a new professional competition, the Suriname Major League, with the Eerste Divisie now serving as the nation's top amateur competition.

The competition was founded in 1924 when Suriname was still a Dutch colony.

== History ==
At the beginning of the 20th century, the NGVB (Guyaneesche Dutch Football Association) was founded. The rival Suriname Football Association was founded on 1 October 1920. There was animosity between the two unions, but with the opening of the stadium by M. de la Fuente a reconciliation was brought about between the unions. The first club formed by the SVB, which still occupies an important place within the Surinamese top flight, was Voorwaarts. On 15 January 1921, Transvaal was established. Before the SVB was founded, there was already another association with the same name. It was founded in 1914. With the creation of the current SVB came a newfound momentum in the development of Surinamese football.

In 2016 the Hoofdklasse was formed into Topklassse. To develop a professional league in Suriname and to get the Surinamese people to support the league and national selection, the SVB signed a deal with Telecommunications Company of Suriname Telesur on 30 September 2016. In this deal, Telesur's daughter company ATV received the rights to broadcast all Surinamese matches live. ATV will also establish a program that will provide viewers with soccer news to keep them up to date with the SVB and football in Suriname.

== Members for 2023 ==
Club	City	Position in 2022	First season in the Eerste Divisie	Top division titles ^{1}	Last title
Broki	Abrabroki	9th	2018–19	–	–
Flora	Flora	Promoted	2023	–	–
Inter Moengotapoe	Moengo	2nd	1993–94	10	2018–19
Inter Wanica	Kwatta	6th	2014–15	–	–
Leo Victor	Paramaribo	3rd	1957–58	5	1992–93
Notch	Moengo	4th	2011–12	–	–
PVV	Paramaribo	7th	2016–17	–	–
Robinhood	Paramaribo	1st	1947–50	25	2022
Santos	Nieuw Nickerie	10th	2018–19	–	–
Slee Juniors	Paramaribo	Promoted	2023	–	–
SNL	Paramaribo	11th	1926	3	1998–99
Transvaal	Paramaribo	8th	1924–25	17	1999–2000
Voorwaarts	Paramaribo	5th	1923–24	6	2001–02

== Champions ==
=== S.V.B. ===
Ed.	Season	Champion	Runner-up
1	1923–24	Olympia	Blauw-Wit
2	1925	Transvaal	Excelsior
3	1926	Ajax	MVV
–	1927	no competition	
4	1928	Ajax	
5	1929	not finished	
6	1930–31	Blauw-Wit-Excelsior	Ajax
7	1932	Cicerone	Voorwaarts
8	1933	Cicerone	Voorwaarts
9	1934	Cicerone	Voorwaarts
10	1935	Cicerone	Go Ahead
11	1936–37	Voorwaarts	Cicerone
12	1937	Transvaal	Voorwaarts
–	1938	no competition	
13	1939–40	Arsenal	
14	1940–41	Voorwaarts	Transvaal
15	1941–42	not finished	
–	1942–45	no competition	
16	1946	MVV	
17	1947–50	MVV	Robinhood
18	1950–51	Transvaal	Robinhood
19	1952	Voorwaarts	Robinhood
20	1953	Robinhood	MVV
21	1954–55	Robinhood	Voorwaarts
22	1955	S.V.B. competition abandoned after merger with N.G.V.B.	
23	1955–56	Robinhood	Voorwaarts
24	1956	Robinhood	
25	1957–58	Voorwaarts	Robinhood
26	1958	no champion	
27	1959	Robinhood	Sonny Boys
28	1960	not finished	
29	1961	Leo Victor	Transvaal
30	1962	Transvaal	Leo Victor
31	1963–64	Leo Victor	Robinhood
32	1964	Robinhood	Transvaal
33	1965	Transvaal	Robinhood
34	1966	Transvaal	Leo Victor
35	1967	Transvaal	MVV
36	1968	Transvaal	Robinhood
37	1969	Transvaal	MVV
38	1970	Transvaal	Robinhood

=== K.S.V.B. ===
Ed.	Season	Champion	Runner-up
39	1971	Robinhood	Transvaal
–	1972	no competition	
40	1973–74	Transvaal	Robinhood
41	1974	Transvaal	Robinhood
42	1975–76	Robinhood	Voorwaarts

=== S.V.B. ===
Ed.	Season	Champion
43	1976–77	Robinhood
44	1977–78	Voorwaarts
45	1978	Leo Victor
46	1979–80	Robinhood
47	1980–81	Robinhood
48	1981–82	Robinhood
49	1982–83	Leo Victor
50	1983–84	Robinhood
51	1984	Robinhood
52	1985–86	Robinhood
53	1986	Robinhood
54	1987–88	Robinhood
55	1988	Robinhood
56	1989–90	Robinhood
57	1990–91	Transvaal
58	1991–92	Transvaal
59	1992–93	Leo Victor
60	1993–94	Robinhood
61	1994–95	Robinhood
62	1995–96	Transvaal
63	1997	Transvaal
64	1998–99	SNL
65	1999–00	Transvaal
–	2000–01	no competition
66	2001–02	Voorwaarts
67	2002–03	Nacional
68	2003–04	Walking Boyz Company
69	2004–05	Robinhood
70	2005–06	Walking Boyz Company
71	2006–07	Inter Moengotapoe
72	2007–08	Boskamp
73	2008–09	Walking Boyz Company
74	2009–10	Inter Moengotapoe
75	2010–11	Inter Moengotapoe
76	2011–12	Robinhood
77	2012–13	Inter Moengotapoe
78	2013–14	Inter Moengotapoe
79	2014–15	Inter Moengotapoe
80	2015–16	Inter Moengotapoe
81	2016–17	Inter Moengotapoe
82	2017–18	Robinhood
83	2018–19	Inter Moengotapoe
84	2019–20	Not finished due to COVID-19 pandemic
–	2020–21	No competition
85	2022	Robinhood
86	2023	Robinhood
87	2024	Robinhood

Source for list of champions: RSSSF

== Titles by club ==
Club	City	Titles	Winning years
Robinhood	Paramaribo	27	1953, 1954–55, 1955–56, 1956, 1959, 1964, 1971, 1975–76, 1976–77, 1979–80, 1980–81, 1981–82, 1983–84, 1984, 1985–86, 1986, 1987–88, 1988, 1989–90, 1993–94, 1994–95, 2004–05, 2011–12, 2017–18, 2022, 2023, 2024
Transvaal	Paramaribo	17	1925, 1937, 1950–51, 1962, 1965, 1966, 1967, 1968, 1969, 1970, 1973–74, 1974, 1990–91, 1991–92, 1995–96, 1997, 1999–2000
Inter Moengotapoe	Moengo	10	2006–07, 2007–08, 2009–10, 2010–11, 2012–13, 2013–14, 2014–15, 2015–16, 2016–17, 2018–19
Voorwaarts	Paramaribo	6	1936–37, 1940–41, 1952, 1957–58, 1977–78, 2001–02
Leo Victor	Paramaribo	5	1961, 1963–64, 1978, 1982–83, 1992–93
Cicerone	Paramaribo	4	1932, 1933, 1934, 1935
SNL (incl. MVV)	Paramaribo	3	1946, 1947–50, 1998–99
Walking Boyz Company	Paramaribo	3	2003–04, 2005–06, 2008–09
Ajax	Paramaribo	2	1926, 1928
Olympia	Paramaribo	1	1923–24
Blauw-Wit-Excelsior	Paramaribo	1	1930–31
Arsenal	Paramaribo	1	1939–40
Nacional	Paramaribo	1	2002–03

== Stadiums ==
The following is a current list of stadiums in the SVB Topklasse;

Stadium	Image	Club(s)	Location	Capacity	Ref.
André Kamperveen Stadion		Robinhood; Transvaal; WBC	Paramaribo	7,000	
Eddy Blackman Stadion	Image	Kamal Dewaker; Takdier Boys	Livorno	2,000	
Dr. Ir. Franklin Essed Stadion		Leo Victor	Paramaribo	3,500	Stadion
Ronnie Brunswijkstadion	Image	Inter Moengotapoe	Moengo	3,000	
Voorwaartsveld		Voorwaarts	Paramaribo	1,500	
J. Eliazer Stadion		Boskamp	Groningen	1,000	
Nacionello Stadion		Nacional Deva Boys	Houttuin	1,500	

== Top goalscorers ==
Season	Goalscorer	Club	Goals
2001–02	(Suriname) Clifton Sandvliet	SNL	27
2002–03	(Suriname) Gordon Kinsaini	SV Robinhood	18
2002–03	(Suriname) Amaktie Maasie	SV Leo Victor	18
2004–05	(Suriname) Cleven Wanabo	Royal '95	24
2005–06	(Suriname) Clifton Sandvliet	WBC	27
2006–07	(Brazil) Alex Pereira Soares	Jai Hanuman	28
2007–08	(Suriname) Ifenildo Vlijter	SV Robinhood	17
2008–09	(Suriname) Anthony Abraham	SV Leo Victor	22
2009–10	(Suriname) Amaktie Maasie	Inter Moengotapoe	12
2010–11	(Suriname) Amaktie Massie	Inter Moengotapoe	19
2011–12	(Suriname) Ulrich Reding	SV Boskamp	20
2011–12	(Suriname) Giovanni Waal	SV Leo Victor	20
2012–13	(Suriname) Galgyto Talea	SV Notch	18
2013–14	(Suriname) Gregory Rigters	WBC	16
2014–15	(Suriname) Gregory Rigters	WBC	20
2015–16	(Suriname) Romeo Kastiel	Inter Moengotapoe	18
2016–17	(Suriname) Ivanildo Rozenblad	SV Robinhood	21
2017–18	(Suriname) Ivanildo Rozenblad	SV Robinhood	22
2018–19	(Suriname) Renzo Akrosie	SNL	33
2022	(Suriname) Finidi Misiedjan	Notch	20
2022	(Suriname) Garvey Kwelling	PVV	20
2023	(Suriname) Shaquille Cairo	SV Robinhood	29

Most time top scorers

- 4 times
  - Delano Rigters (1984, 1987, 1988 and 1989)

Most goals scored by a player in a single season

- 33 goals
  - Renzo Akrosie (2018–19)

Most goals scored by a player in a single game

- 6 goals
  - Taffarel Doekoe (Leo Victor) 10–3 against Inter Wanica, (2023)

== Multiple hat-tricks ==
Rank	Country	Player	Hat-tricks
1	(Suriname)	Finidi Misiedjan	4
2	(Suriname)	Shaquille Cairo	3
3	(Suriname)	Taffarel Doekoe	2
3	(Suriname)	Rievaldo Doorson	2
3	(Suriname)	Garvey Kwelling	2
3	(Suriname)	Ra I Penas	2
3	(Suriname)	Jetro Rees	2
8	(Suriname)	Shelton Akooi	1
8	(Suriname)	Romeo Kastiel	1
8	(Suriname)	Otniel Koulen	1
8	(Suriname)	Mechino Libretto	1
8	(Suriname)	Gillian Maatrijk	1
8	(Suriname)	Savgensa Miseidjan	1
8	(Suriname)	Rötger Neiden	1
8	(Suriname)	Quilliano Stebenburg	1
8	(Suriname)	Lalanie Tooy	1

Most hat-tricks in a single season

- 19 hat-tricks (2022)

Most hat-tricks by a player in a single season

- 4 hat-tricks
  - Finidi Misiedjan (2022)

== See also ==
- List of SVB Hoofdklasse top scorers
- Surinamese Footballer of the Year
