= S.V. Excelsior =

Surinamese football club

Excelsior
- Full name: Sporting Voetbal Excelsior
- Nickname: The Kralingers of Suriname
- Founded: 7 June 1918; 108 years ago
- Ground: Meerzorg Stadion; Meerzorg
- Capacity: 1,300
- Chairman: (Suriname)
- Manager: (Suriname)
- League: Lidbondentoernooi
- 2015–16: Hoofdklasse, 10th (relegated)
Home colours	Away colours

SV Excelsior is an amateur football club from the Commewijne District town of Meerzorg, Suriname. The club was founded in 1918 and spent most of its tenure in the top flight of Surinamese football. Recently, the club had been in a dry spell, and spent time in the second tier of Surinamese football, only recently to be promoted back into the Hoofdklasse. For the 2013/2014 season the Excelsior club finished in second place behind champions Inter Moengotapoe (Moengo).

== Honors ==
- SVB Hoofdklasse

Champions: 1930–31

- SVB Eerste Klasse

Runners-up: 2009–10

- Beker van Suriname: 1

Winners: 2010

== Current squad ==
Note: Flags indicate national team as defined under FIFA eligibility rules; some limited exceptions apply. Players may hold more than one non-FIFA nationality.

No.	Pos.	Nation	Player
—	DF	SUR	Jetro Fer
—	FW	SUR	Wensley Christoph
—	FW	SUR	Giovanni Drenthe
—	FW	BRA	Ailton Paiva
