= Sportvereniging Nationaal Leger =

Surinamese football club

SNL
- Full name: Sportvereniging Nationaal Leger
- Founded: 5 January 1926; 100 years ago (as Militaire Voetbal Vereniging)
- Ground: Dr. Ir. Franklin Essed Stadion, Paramaribo, Suriname
- Capacity: 3,500
- Chairman: R. Samuel
- League: Eerste Divisie
- 2023: Eerste Divisie, 9th of 14
Home colours	Away colours	Third colours

Sportvereniging Nationaal Leger, known as SNL, is the Surinamese football club of the national military, which currently plays in the Eerste Divisie. They play their home games in Paramaribo at the Dr. Ir. Franklin Essed Stadion.

== History ==
=== Early years ===
In 1926, the military football club M.V.V. (Militaire Voetbal Vereniging) was founded, out of which SNL amalgamated. Prior to the establishment of M.V.V. however, there was another football club of the Surinamese military, namely M.V.C.J. (Militaire Voetbal Club Juliana), founded in 1909. The club was founded by Captain Hirschman, who felt that playing football was an ideal military practice, training the capacity to oversee the dynamic on a playing field, while training speed and accuracy.

MVCJ were the first official football club in Suriname, considered the team to beat in the heyday of the sport, they played a major role in the development of football in the country.

In 1911, they won the first football competition held in Suriname, while finishing as runners-up in the SVB Tweede Klasse. Other military clubs from the beginning years of football in Suriname include Zeelandia, Concordia and U.D.I. (Uitspanning Door Inspanning). The aforementioned clubs were eventually all dissolved, with MVCJ going under in 1926. Notable former players of MVCJ include Steenlage, van Lint, Rijzenbrei, Remens, Dijkstra, Bulting, Greeneveld, van der Elst, Rovers, J. Arentz, Graat, Donckers, Smit, Kroes, Lijssen, de Roo, Meyer, Dijkstra, Smeulders and Blom.

=== Foundation ===
On 5 January 1926 the Militaire Voetbal Vereniging (English: Military Football Union) was founded. The goal was to create a club, where soldiers were able to exercise their mental and physical condition amongst the top footballing athletes in the country while building camaraderie. In 1929, the club finished as runners-up in the National competition.

=== 1940s–1950s ===
During the forties and fifties, MVV were known as the bear in the competition, due to the physical strength the team brought to the competition. MVV finished atop the league table in both 1948 and 1949, winning consecutive National championships.

In 1975, MVV had reached a deep point when they finished at the bottom of the league table, thus relegating to the SVB Eerste Klasse, they returned to the SVB Hoofdklasse the following year. Notable players of MVV during the forties and fifties include A. Nijman, A. Babb, E. Paton, R. Zorgvol, H. Leeuwin, R. de Clerq, D. Samson, R. Nelom, Ch. Knel, H. Alberga, A. Kamperveen, P. Mac Donald, C. Orna, G. Cairo, Belfor, Amelo, Derby, Schrijvers, Niekoop, Wouter, Letbom, Triel, Hedly, Doesburg, Plein and Oosterdorp.

=== Expansion and name change ===
Due to the expansion in sports of the National military, the club was renamed S.N.L. (Sportvereniging Nationaal Leger) in 1982. Seeing the club expand to include divisions for Athletics, Korfbal, Basketball and Boxing. In 1985, the football team finished as league runner-up, and in 1998–99 won the league title once more.

== Honours ==
- Hoofdklasse
  - Champions (3): 1948*, 1949*, 1998–99
- Beker van Suriname
  - Runners-up (1): 1992
- Emancipatiebeker
  - Winners (2): 1927*, 1931*

* won as M.V.V.
