= S.V. Walking Boyz Company =

Surinamese football club

Walking Boyz Company
- Full name: Sport Vereniging Walking Boyz Company
- Nickname(s): WBC, WBC Paramaribo, Walking Boyz Company
- Founded: 16 January 1997
- Dissolved: 2019
- Ground: Franklin Essed Stadion; Paramaribo
- Capacity: 3,500
- President: Glenn Ramautar
- League: Topklasse
- 2017–18: 5th
Home colours	Away colours

S.V. Walking Boyz Company (also SV WBC or WBC), was a Surinamese association football club based in Paramaribo. They have won the Surinamese Hoofdklasse title three times. The club play at the Essed Stadion with a capacity of 3,500 spectators, which is also the National Stadium and is shared with several clubs.

== History ==
Walking Boyz Company were founded on 16 January 1997 in Paramaribo. Seven years later the team won its first national championship, winning the first Championship-Super Cup double in Suriname in 2004. WBC went on to win two more national titles in 2006 and 2009, winning the Super Cup (Suriname President's Cup) as well on both occasions.

Due to their results, the club were able to participate in the CFU Club Championship, the International Caribbean club competition which leads to qualification for the CONCACAF Champions League. Their best result was a second round finish of the tournament on two occasions. Losing to Joe Public from Trinidad and Tobago in 2010, and to the Puerto Rico Islanders in the 2011 edition.

== Roster ==
=== First team squad ===
as of 30 March 2011
Note: Flags indicate national team as defined under FIFA eligibility rules; some limited exceptions apply. Players may hold more than one non-FIFA nationality.

No.	Pos.	Nation	Player
1	GK	(Suriname) SUR	Dewkumar Somai
2	DF	(Suriname) SUR	Ferdinand Jap-A-Joe
3	MF	(Suriname) SUR	Clifton Sandvliet
4	DF	(Suriname) SUR	Renando Lupson
5	DF	(Suriname) SUR	Clifton Tijn Liep Shie
6	DF	(Suriname) SUR	Johannes Asaimi
7	FW	(Netherlands) NED	Fabian van Dijk
8	MF	(Suriname) SUR	Vangelino Sastrodimedjo
9	MF	(Peru) PER	Piero Gonzales
10	FW	(Suriname) SUR	Gregory Rigters
11	FW	(Suriname) SUR	Bebeto Odang
12	DF	(Trinidad and Tobago) TRI	Marlon Filter
14	MF	(Trinidad and Tobago) TRI	Mitchel Lynch

No.	Pos.	Nation	Player
15	MF	(Suriname) SUR	Vernon Etnel
18	GK	(Grenada) GRN	Robert Perre
20	FW	(Suriname) SUR	Gino Brandon
20	FW	(Suriname) SUR	Iwan Ave
21	FW	(Brazil) BRA	Alex
22	GK	(Suriname) SUR	Andrew Zebeda
23	MF	(Netherlands) NED	Milton Koenders
91	GK	(Netherlands) NED	Aron Kogel
24	FW	(Curaçao) CUW	Regillo Kemper
25	FW	(Suriname) SUR	Garry Sordjo
26	FW	(Suriname) SUR	Elias Afonsoewa
30	GK	(Suriname) SUR	Jerrell Robert
33	MF	(Suriname) SUR	Romano Sordam

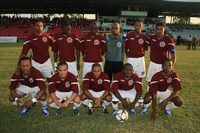
WBC lining up ahead of the 2009 Suriname President's Cup final against Inter Moengotapoe

== List of coaches ==
- (Suriname) Andy Atmodimedjo (2003–05)
- (Suriname) Roy Vanenburg (2007–10)
- (Suriname) Jimmy Hoepel (2010–12)

== Results ==
=== International competitions ===
- 2010 CFU Club Championship

First Round v. (Guyana) Defense Force – 2:1
First Round v. (Guyana) Alpha United – 1:1
First Round v. (Dominica) Centre Bath Estate – 3:0
Second Round v. (Trinidad and Tobago) Joe Public – 0:5
Second Round v. (Saint Vincent and the Grenadines) System 3 – 2:0

- 2011 CFU Club Championship

First Stage v. (Saint Lucia) Northern United All Stars – 3:1, 3:0
Second Stage v. Puerto Rico Islanders – 1:1, 0:7

== Honours ==
=== National ===
- Hoofdklasse: 3

2004, 2006, 2009

- Beker van Suriname: 1

2009

- Suriname President's Cup: 3

2004, 2006, 2009

=== Other ===
- Paramaribo Cup: 3

2007, 2008, 2009
