= List of CONCACAF Champions Cup and Champions League finals =

- Organiser(s): CONCACAF
- Founded: 1962; 64 years ago
- Region: North America; Central America; Caribbean
- Teams: 27; 2 (finalists)
- Current champions: (Mexico) Toluca (3rd title)
- Most championships: (Mexico) América (Mexico) Cruz Azul (7 titles each)
- 2026 CONCACAF Champions Cup final

The CONCACAF Champions Cup is a seasonal association football competition established in 1962. From its foundation until 2008, it was known as the CONCACAF Champions' Cup. Prior to the 2024 season, the tournament was named the CONCACAF Champions League (2008–2023). It is the top continental football competition organized by CONCACAF for clubs from North America, Central America and the Caribbean. The participating clubs qualify for the tournament, based on their performance in its national leagues. The competition has been held in 61 editions, from 1962 to 2026, with 63 titles awarded due to the shared title for three clubs in the 1978 edition. The tournament has had 30 clubs from nine nations, that have won at least one title, with Mexican clubs being the most successful with 14 clubs winning 41 titles in total.

From 1962 to 1991, the final was contested over two legs, one match at each stadium of the finalist clubs. Guadalajara won the inaugural edition in 1962, defeating Comunicaciones 6–0 on aggregate score. The first edition with a single final match played at a neutral venue was held in 1992, in which América defeated Alajuelense at the Santa Ana Stadium in Santa Ana, California. The format returned to two-legged matches from the 2003 edition, except for the 2020 edition that was affected by the COVID-19 pandemic. In the 2021 and starting with the 2024 editions, a single-leg final match was played at the home of the club with the best performance in the tournament.

In 10 editions of the tournament, a final match for the title was not held (1963, 1968, 1970, 1973, 1978, 1980, 1984, 1993, 1995 and 1996). In 16 editions, the final was contested between clubs from the same national association, with 15 finals between Mexican clubs (1996, 2002, 2003, 2006, 2007, 2009, 2010, 2012, 2013, 2014, 2016, 2017, 2019, 2021, and 2026) and one final between Costa Rican clubs (2004).

América and Cruz Azul are the most successful in titles won, winning seven titles each, followed by Pachuca with six titles. Only four clubs have won two or more consecutive titles and all of them Mexican clubs, Cruz Azul is the only club to achieve it twice (1969, 1970, 1971 and 1996, 1997), Pachuca (2007, 2008), Monterrey (2011, 2012, 2013), and América (2015, 2016).

Pachuca were the last champions before the competition was renamed as CONCACAF Champions League in 2008, defeating Saprissa 3–2 on aggregate score in the 2008 finals. Under the Champions League format, only clubs from Liga MX and Major League Soccer (three clubs from the United States and two from Canada) have reached the final. From 2006 to 2021, all titles were won by Mexican clubs. Seattle Sounders FC became the first and only non-Mexican club to win the title under the name Champions League, defeating Pumas UNAM in the 2022 final.

== List of finals ==
Key
| ‡ | Finals decided in a playoff |
| * | Finals decided by a penalty shoot-out |
| † | Match went to extra time |
| & | Finals decided on away goals |

- The "Season" column refers to the season the competition was held, and wikilinks to the article about that season.
- Finals are listed in the order they were played.

List of CONCACAF Champions Cup and Champions League finals
| Season | Winners | | Score | Runners-up | | Venue |
| Season | Country | Team | Score | Team | Country | Venue |
|---|---|---|---|---|---|---|
| 1962 | Mexico | Guadalajara | 1–0 | Comunicaciones | Guatemala | Estadio Mateo Flores, Guatemala City |
| 1962 | Mexico | Guadalajara | 5–0 | Comunicaciones | Guatemala | (Mexico) Estadio Jalisco, Guadalajara |
| 1963 | Haiti | Racing Club Haïtien | (Note: Difficulties in securing passports for Racing players in time for the September final in Guadalajara caused the match to be postponed three times. After Guadalajara protested to CONCACAF in February 1964, they were declared champions, but after a counter-protest, CONCACAF decided in April that both legs of the final should be played within two months. This forced Guadalajara to withdraw because they were on a tour of Europe at that time: therefore, the final was scratched, and Racing were declared champions.) | Guadalajara | Mexico | |
| 1964 | Not awarded | | | | | |
| 1965 | Not awarded | | | | | |
| 1966 | Not held | | | | | |
| 1967 | El Salvador | Alianza | 1–2 | Jong Colombia | Netherlands Antilles | (Netherlands Antilles) Ergilio Hato Stadium, Willemstad |
| 1967 | El Salvador | Alianza | 3–0 | Jong Colombia | Netherlands Antilles | (El Salvador) Estadio Nacional Flor Blanca, San Salvador |
| 1967 | El Salvador | Alianza | 5–3^{‡} | Jong Colombia | Netherlands Antilles | (El Salvador) Estadio Nacional Flor Blanca, San Salvador |
| 1968 | Mexico | Toluca | (Note: The final was scratched and Toluca were declared champions after Aurora and Transvaal were ejected from the competition.) | | | |
| 1969 | Mexico | Cruz Azul | 0–0 | Comunicaciones | Guatemala | Estadio Mateo Flores, Guatemala City |
| 1969 | Mexico | Cruz Azul | 1–0 | Comunicaciones | Guatemala | Estadio Azul, Mexico City |
| 1970 | Mexico | Cruz Azul | (Note: The semi-finals and final were scratched and Cruz Azul were declared champions after Saprissa and Transvaal withdrew.) | | | |
| 1971 | Mexico | Cruz Azul | 5–1^{‡} (Note: The championship was to be decided by a final hexagonal, but Cruz Azul and Alajuelense finished level on points, meaning a playoff match was required.) | Alajuelense | Costa Rica | Estadio Azul, Mexico City |
| 1972 | Honduras | Olimpia | 1–0 | Robinhood | Suriname | (Honduras) Estadio General Francisco Morazán, San Pedro Sula |
| 1972 | Honduras | Olimpia | 0–0 | Robinhood | Suriname | (Honduras) Estadio Tiburcio Carías Andino, Tegucigalpa |
| 1973 | Suriname | Transvaal | (Note: The semi-finals and final were scratched and Transvaal were declared champions after Saprissa and Alajuelense withdrew.) | | | |
| 1974 | Guatemala | Municipal | 2–1 | Transvaal | Suriname | Estadio Mateo Flores, Guatemala City |
| 1974 | Guatemala | Municipal | 2–1 | Transvaal | Suriname | Estadio Mateo Flores, Guatemala City |
| 1975 | Mexico | Atlético Español | 3–0 | Transvaal | Suriname | (Suriname) National Stadium, Paramaribo |
| 1975 | Mexico | Atlético Español | 2–1 | Transvaal | Suriname | (Suriname) National Stadium, Paramaribo |
| 1976 | El Salvador | Águila | 5–1 | Robinhood | Suriname | (El Salvador) Estadio Cuscatlán, San Salvador |
| 1976 | El Salvador | Águila | 3–2^{†} | Robinhood | Suriname | (El Salvador) Estadio Cuscatlán, San Salvador |
| 1977 | Mexico | América | 1–0 | Robinhood | Suriname | (Suriname) National Stadium, Paramaribo |
| 1977 | Mexico | América | 1–1 | Robinhood | Suriname | (Suriname) National Stadium, Paramaribo |
| 1978 | Mexico | Leones Negros UdeG | (Note: The final triangular was scratched and Universidad de Guadalajara, Comunicaciones, and Defence Force were declared joint winners due to administrative problems and disagreement on match dates.) | | | |
| 1978 | Guatemala | Comunicaciones | (Note: The final triangular was scratched and Universidad de Guadalajara, Comunicaciones, and Defence Force were declared joint winners due to administrative problems and disagreement on match dates.) | | | |
| 1978 | Trinidad and Tobago | Defence Force | (Note: The final triangular was scratched and Universidad de Guadalajara, Comunicaciones, and Defence Force were declared joint winners due to administrative problems and disagreement on match dates.) | | | |
| 1979 | El Salvador | FAS | 1–1 | Jong Colombia | Netherlands Antilles | (Netherlands Antilles) Ergilio Hato Stadium, Willemstad |
| 1979 | El Salvador | FAS | 7–1 | Jong Colombia | Netherlands Antilles | (El Salvador) Estadio Cuscatlán, San Salvador |
| 1980 | Mexico | Pumas UNAM | (Note: The championship was decided by a final triangular.) | UNAH | Honduras | |
| 1981 | Suriname | Transvaal | 1–0 | Atlético Marte | El Salvador | (Suriname) National Stadium, Paramaribo |
| 1981 | Suriname | Transvaal | 1–1 | Atlético Marte | El Salvador | (Suriname) National Stadium, Paramaribo |
| 1982 | Mexico | Pumas UNAM | 0–0 | Robinhood | Suriname | (Mexico) Estadio Corregidora, Querétaro |
| 1982 | Mexico | Pumas UNAM | 3–2 | Robinhood | Suriname | Estadio Olímpico Universitario, Mexico City |
| 1983 | Mexico | Atlante | 1–1 | Robinhood | Suriname | (Suriname) National Stadium, Paramaribo |
| 1983 | Mexico | Atlante | 5–0 | Robinhood | Suriname | Estadio Olímpico Universitario, Mexico City |
| 1984 | Haiti | Violette | (Note: The final triangular was scratched and Violette were awarded the championship after CD Guadalajara and New York Pancyprian-Freedoms were both disqualified for failing to agree on match dates.) | | | |
| 1985 | Trinidad and Tobago | Defence Force | 2–0 | Olimpia | Honduras | (Trinidad and Tobago) National Stadium, Port of Spain |
| 1985 | Trinidad and Tobago | Defence Force | 0–1 | Olimpia | Honduras | (Honduras) Estadio General Francisco Morazán, San Pedro Sula |
| 1986 | Costa Rica | Alajuelense | 4–1 | Transvaal | Suriname | (Costa Rica) Estadio Alejandro Morera Soto, Alajuela |
| 1986 | Costa Rica | Alajuelense | 2–1 | Transvaal | Suriname | (Costa Rica) Estadio Alejandro Morera Soto, Alajuela |
| 1987 | Mexico | América | 1–1 | Defence Force | Trinidad and Tobago | (Trinidad and Tobago) National Stadium, Port of Spain |
| 1987 | Mexico | América | 2–0 | Defence Force | Trinidad and Tobago | Estadio Azteca, Mexico City |
| 1988 | Honduras | Olimpia | 2–0 | Defence Force | Trinidad and Tobago | (Honduras) Estadio Tiburcio Carías Andino, Tegucigalpa |
| 1988 | Honduras | Olimpia | 2–0 | Defence Force | Trinidad and Tobago | (Honduras) Estadio Tiburcio Carías Andino, Tegucigalpa |
| 1989 | Mexico | Pumas UNAM | 1–1 | Pinar del Río | Cuba | (Cuba) Estadio Capitán San Luis, Pinar del Río |
| 1989 | Mexico | Pumas UNAM | 3–1 | Pinar del Río | Cuba | Estadio Olímpico Universitario, Mexico City |
| 1990 | Mexico | América | 2–2 | Pinar del Río | Cuba | (Cuba) Estadio Capitán San Luis, Pinar del Río |
| 1990 | Mexico | América | 6–0 | Pinar del Río | Cuba | Estadio Azteca, Mexico City |
| 1991 | Mexico | Puebla | 3–1 | Police | Trinidad and Tobago | (Mexico) Estadio Cuauhtémoc, Puebla |
| 1991 | Mexico | Puebla | 1–1 | Police | Trinidad and Tobago | (Trinidad and Tobago) National Stadium, Port of Spain |
| 1992 | Mexico | América | 1–0 | Alajuelense | Costa Rica | (United States) Santa Ana Stadium, Santa Ana |
| 1993 | Costa Rica | Saprissa | (Note: The championship was decided by a final quadrangular.) | León | Mexico | |
| 1994 | Costa Rica | Cartaginés | 3–2 | Atlante | Mexico | (United States) Spartan Stadium, San José |
| 1995 | Costa Rica | Saprissa | | Municipal | Guatemala | (Costa Rica) Estadio Ricardo Saprissa Aymá, San Juan de Tibás |
| 1996 | Mexico | Cruz Azul | | Necaxa | Mexico | |
| 1997 | Mexico | Cruz Azul | 5–3 | LA Galaxy | United States | (United States) Robert F. Kennedy Memorial Stadium, Washington, D.C. |
| 1998 | United States | D.C. United | 1–0 | Toluca | Mexico | (United States) Robert F. Kennedy Memorial Stadium, Washington, D.C. |
| 1999 | Mexico | Necaxa | 2–1 | Alajuelense | Costa Rica | (United States) Sam Boyd Stadium, Whitney |
| 2000 | United States | LA Galaxy | 3–2 | Olimpia | Honduras | (United States) Los Angeles Memorial Coliseum, Los Angeles |
| 2001 | Not held | | | | | |
| 2002 | Mexico | Pachuca | 1–0 | Monarcas Morelia | Mexico | Estadio Azul, Mexico City |
| 2003 | Mexico | Toluca | 3–3 | Monarcas Morelia | Mexico | (Mexico) Estadio Morelos, Morelia |
| 2003 | Mexico | Toluca | 2–1 | Monarcas Morelia | Mexico | (Mexico) Estadio Nemesio Díez, Toluca |
| 2004 | Costa Rica | Alajuelense | 1–1 | Saprissa | Costa Rica | (Costa Rica) Estadio Eladio Rosabal Cordero, Heredia |
| 2004 | Costa Rica | Alajuelense | 4–0 | Saprissa | Costa Rica | (Costa Rica) Estadio Alejandro Morera Soto, Alajuela |
| 2005 | Costa Rica | Saprissa | 2–0 | Pumas UNAM | Mexico | (Costa Rica) Estadio Ricardo Saprissa Aymá, San Juan de Tibás |
| 2005 | Costa Rica | Saprissa | 1–2 | Pumas UNAM | Mexico | Estadio Olímpico Universitario, Mexico City |
| 2006 | Mexico | América | 0–0 | Toluca | Mexico | (Mexico) Estadio Nemesio Díez, Toluca |
| 2006 | Mexico | América | 2–1^{†} | Toluca | Mexico | Estadio Azteca, Mexico City |
| 2007 | Mexico | Pachuca | 2–2 | Guadalajara | Mexico | (Mexico) Estadio Jalisco, Guadalajara |
| 2007 | Mexico | Pachuca | 0–0* (Note: Score was 2–2 aggregate after 90 minutes and extra time. Pachuca won the penalty shoot-out 7–6.) | Guadalajara | Mexico | (Mexico) Estadio Hidalgo, Pachuca |
| 2008 | Mexico | Pachuca | 1–1 | Saprissa | Costa Rica | (Costa Rica) Estadio Ricardo Saprissa Aymá, San Juan de Tibás |
| 2008 | Mexico | Pachuca | 2–1 | Saprissa | Costa Rica | (Mexico) Estadio Hidalgo, Pachuca |
| 2008–09 | Mexico | Atlante | 2–0 | Cruz Azul | Mexico | Estadio Azul, Mexico City |
| 2008–09 | Mexico | Atlante | 0–0 | Cruz Azul | Mexico | (Mexico) Estadio Andrés Quintana Roo, Cancún |
| 2009–10 | Mexico | Pachuca | 1–2 | Cruz Azul | Mexico | Estadio Azul, Mexico City |
| 2009–10 | Mexico | Pachuca | 1–0^{&} | Cruz Azul | Mexico | (Mexico) Estadio Hidalgo, Pachuca |
| 2010–11 | Mexico | Monterrey | 2–2 | Real Salt Lake | United States | (Mexico) Estadio Tecnológico, Monterrey |
| 2010–11 | Mexico | Monterrey | 1–0 | Real Salt Lake | United States | (United States) Rio Tinto Stadium, Sandy |
| 2011–12 | Mexico | Monterrey | 2–0 | Santos Laguna | Mexico | (Mexico) Estadio Tecnológico, Monterrey |
| 2011–12 | Mexico | Monterrey | 1–2 | Santos Laguna | Mexico | (Mexico) Estadio Corona, Torreón |
| 2012–13 | Mexico | Monterrey | 0–0 | Santos Laguna | Mexico | (Mexico) Estadio Corona, Torreón |
| 2012–13 | Mexico | Monterrey | 4–2 | Santos Laguna | Mexico | (Mexico) Estadio Tecnológico, Monterrey |
| 2013–14 | Mexico | Cruz Azul | 0–0 | Toluca | Mexico | Estadio Azul, Mexico City |
| 2013–14 | Mexico | Cruz Azul | 1–1^{&} | Toluca | Mexico | (Mexico) Estadio Nemesio Díez, Toluca |
| 2014–15 | Mexico | América | 1–1 | Montreal Impact | Canada | Estadio Azteca, Mexico City |
| 2014–15 | Mexico | América | 4–2 | Montreal Impact | Canada | (Canada) Olympic Stadium, Montreal |
| 2015–16 | Mexico | América | 2–0 | Tigres UANL | Mexico | (Mexico) Estadio Universitario, San Nicolás de los Garza |
| 2015–16 | Mexico | América | 2–1 | Tigres UANL | Mexico | Estadio Azteca, Mexico City |
| 2016–17 | Mexico | Pachuca | 1–1 | Tigres UANL | Mexico | (Mexico) Estadio Universitario, San Nicolás de los Garza |
| 2016–17 | Mexico | Pachuca | 1–0 | Tigres UANL | Mexico | (Mexico) Estadio Hidalgo, Pachuca |
| 2018 | Mexico | Guadalajara | 2–1 | Toronto FC | Canada | (Canada) BMO Field, Toronto |
| 2018 | Mexico | Guadalajara | 1–2* (Note: Score was 3–3 aggregate after 90 minutes. Guadalajara won the penalty shoot-out 4–2.) | Toronto FC | Canada | (Mexico) Estadio Akron, Guadalajara |
| 2019 | Mexico | Monterrey | 1–0 | Tigres UANL | Mexico | (Mexico) Estadio Universitario, San Nicolás de los Garza |
| 2019 | Mexico | Monterrey | 1–1 | Tigres UANL | Mexico | (Mexico) Estadio BBVA Bancomer, Guadalupe |
| 2020 | Mexico | Tigres UANL | 2–1 | Los Angeles FC | United States | (United States) Exploria Stadium, Orlando |
| 2021 | Mexico | Monterrey | 1–0 | América | Mexico | (Mexico) Estadio BBVA Bancomer, Guadalupe |
| 2022 | United States | Seattle Sounders FC | 2–2 | Pumas UNAM | Mexico | Estadio Olímpico Universitario, Mexico City |
| 2022 | United States | Seattle Sounders FC | 3–0 | Pumas UNAM | Mexico | (United States) Lumen Field, Seattle |
| 2023 | Mexico | León | 2–1 | Los Angeles FC | United States | (Mexico) Estadio León, León |
| 2023 | Mexico | León | 1–0 | Los Angeles FC | United States | (United States) BMO Stadium, Los Angeles |
| 2024 | Mexico | Pachuca | 3–0 | Columbus Crew | United States | (Mexico) Estadio Hidalgo, Pachuca |
| 2025 | Mexico | Cruz Azul | 5–0 | Vancouver Whitecaps FC | Canada | Estadio Olímpico Universitario, Mexico City |
| 2026 | Mexico | Toluca | 1–1* (Note: Score was 1–1 after extra time. Toluca won the penalty shoot-out 6–5.) | Tigres UANL | Mexico | (Mexico) Estadio Nemesio Díez, Toluca |

== Performances ==
=== By club ===
Performance by club
| Club | Titles | Runners-up | Years won | Years runners-up |
|---|---|---|---|---|
| (Mexico) Cruz Azul | 7 | 2 | 1969, 1970, 1971, 1996, 1997, 2013–14, 2025 | 2008–09, 2009–10 |
| (Mexico) América | 7 | 1 | 1977, 1987, 1990, 1992, 2006, 2014–15, 2015–16 | 2021 |
| (Mexico) Pachuca | 6 | 0 | 2002, 2007, 2008, 2009–10, 2016–17, 2024 | — |
| (Mexico) Monterrey | 5 | 0 | 2010–11, 2011–12, 2012–13, 2019, 2021 | — |
| (Mexico) Toluca | 3 | 3 | 1968, 2003, 2026 | 1998, 2006, 2013–14 |
| (Costa Rica) Saprissa | 3 | 2 | 1993, 1995, 2005 | 2004, 2008 |
| (Mexico) Pumas UNAM | 3 | 2 | 1980, 1982, 1989 | 2005, 2022 |
| (Suriname) Transvaal | 2 | 3 | 1973, 1981 | 1974, 1975, 1986 |
| (Costa Rica) Alajuelense | 2 | 3 | 1986, 2004 | 1971, 1992, 1999 |
| (Mexico) Guadalajara | 2 | 2 | 1962, 2018 | 1963, 2007 |
| (Honduras) Olimpia | 2 | 2 | 1972, 1988 | 1985, 2000 |
| (Trinidad and Tobago) Defence Force | 2 | 2 | 1978^{1}, 1985 | 1987, 1988 |
| (Mexico) Atlante | 2 | 1 | 1983, 2008–09 | 1994 |
| (Mexico) Tigres UANL | 1 | 4 | 2020 | 2015–16, 2016–17, 2019, 2026 |
| (Guatemala) Comunicaciones | 1 | 2 | 1978^{1} | 1962, 1969 |
| (Guatemala) Municipal | 1 | 1 | 1974 | 1995 |
| (Mexico) Necaxa | 1 | 1 | 1999 | 1996 |
| (United States) LA Galaxy | 1 | 1 | 2000 | 1997 |
| (Mexico) León | 1 | 1 | 2023 | 1993 |
| (Haiti) Racing CH | 1 | 0 | 1963 | — |
| (El Salvador) Alianza | 1 | 0 | 1967 | — |
| (Mexico) Atlético Español | 1 | 0 | 1975 | — |
| (El Salvador) Águila | 1 | 0 | 1976 | — |
| (Mexico) UdeG | 1 | 0 | 1978^{1} | — |
| (El Salvador) FAS | 1 | 0 | 1979 | — |
| (Haiti) Violette | 1 | 0 | 1984 | — |
| (Mexico) Puebla | 1 | 0 | 1991 | — |
| (Costa Rica) Cartaginés | 1 | 0 | 1994 | — |
| (United States) D.C. United | 1 | 0 | 1998 | — |
| (United States) Seattle Sounders FC | 1 | 0 | 2022 | — |
| (Suriname) Robinhood | 0 | 5 | — | 1972, 1976, 1977, 1982, 1983 |
| (Curaçao) Jong Colombia | 0 | 2 | — | 1967, 1979 |
| (Cuba) Pinar del Río | 0 | 2 | — | 1989, 1990 |
| (Mexico) Morelia | 0 | 2 | — | 2002, 2003 |
| (Mexico) Santos Laguna | 0 | 2 | — | 2011–12, 2012–13 |
| (United States) Los Angeles FC | 0 | 2 | — | 2020, 2023 |
| (Honduras) Universidad | 0 | 1 | — | 1980 |
| (El Salvador) Atlético Marte | 0 | 1 | — | 1981 |
| (Trinidad and Tobago) Police | 0 | 1 | — | 1991 |
| (United States) Real Salt Lake | 0 | 1 | — | 2010–11 |
| (Canada) CF Montréal | 0 | 1 | — | 2014–15 |
| (Canada) Toronto FC | 0 | 1 | — | 2018 |
| (United States) Columbus Crew | 0 | 1 | — | 2024 |
| (Canada) Vancouver Whitecaps FC | 0 | 1 | — | 2025 |

Notes

1. Title shared, the final round was not held, the winners of the North American, Central American and Caribbean zones were declared joint champions.

=== By nation ===
Performance by nation
| Nation | Titles | Runners-up | Total |
|---|---|---|---|
| Mexico^{1} | 41 | 21 | 62 |
| Costa Rica | 6 | 5 | 11 |
| United States | 3 | 5 | 8 |
| El Salvador | 3 | 1 | 4 |
| Suriname | 2 | 8 | 10 |
| Honduras | 2 | 3 | 5 |
| Trinidad and Tobago^{1} | 2 | 3 | 5 |
| Guatemala^{1} | 2 | 3 | 5 |
| Haiti | 2 | 0 | 2 |
| Canada | 0 | 3 | 3 |
| Cuba | 0 | 2 | 2 |
| Curaçao | 0 | 2 | 2 |

Notes

1. Includes 1 title shared
