= 1974 CONCACAF Champions' Cup =

10th edition of premier club football tournament organized by CONCACAF

Copa de Campeones Concacaf

Tournament details
- Dates: 5 May – 27 October
- Teams: 17 (from 9 associations)

Final positions
- Champions: (Guatemala) Municipal
- Runners-up: (Suriname (Kingdom of the Netherlands)) Transvaal

The 1974 CONCACAF Champions' Cup was the 10th edition of the annual international club football competition held in the CONCACAF region (North America, Central America and the Caribbean), the CONCACAF Champions' Cup. It determined that year's club champion of association football in the CONCACAF region and was played from 5 May till 27 October 1974 with all the matches played under the home/away match.

The teams were split in 3 zones (North American, Central American and Caribbean), each one qualifying the winner to the final tournament. As no clubs entered in the North American section, the winner of the two remaining zones gained the qualification to the final. Municipal from Guatemala won the tournament, becoming CONCACAF champion for the first time.

== North American Zone ==
Entrants included:
(Bermuda) Devonshire Colts
(Bermuda) North Village CC
(United States) Maccabi Los Angeles

As all clubs withdrew, the zone was cancelled.

== Central American Zone ==
=== First round ===
Torneo Centroamericano de Concacaf 1974

Team 1	Agg.	Team 2	1st leg	2nd leg
Saprissa (Costa Rica)	3–3	(Guatemala) Aurora	2–1	1–2
Motagua (Honduras)	3–0	(Costa Rica) Cartaginés	1–0	2–0
Marathón (Honduras)	0–4	(Guatemala) Municipal	0–1	0–3
Alianza (El Salvador)	5–0*	(Nicaragua) CD UCA	5–0	
Deportivo Santa Cecilia (Nicaragua)	4–5	(El Salvador) Negocios Internacionales	4–1	0–4

12 May 1974	Saprissa (Costa Rica)	2–1	(Guatemala) Aurora	San Juan de Tibás
	Carlos Solano; Gerardo Solano		Fernando Solano (o.g.)	Stadium: Estadio Ricardo Saprissa Aymá

19 May 1974	Aurora (Guatemala)	2–1 (3–3 agg.)	(Costa Rica) Saprissa	Guatemala City, Guatemala
	René Morales; Gerardo Granja		Gerardo Solano	Stadium: Estadio del Ejército

(Guatemala) Aurora advanced to the Second Round

5 May 1974	Motagua (Honduras)	1–0	(Costa Rica) Cartaginés	Tegucigalpa
	Oscar Hernandez 40'			Stadium: Estadio Nacional Chelato Uclés

19 May 1974	Cartaginés (Costa Rica)	0–2 (2–3 agg.)	(Honduras) Motagua	Cartago
			Mario Artica; Ruben Guifarra	Stadium: Estadio José Rafael "Fello" Meza Ivankovich

(Honduras) Motagua advanced to the Second Round

19 May 1974	Marathón (Honduras)	0–1	(Guatemala) Municipal	San Pedro Sula
			José Emilio Mitrovich	Stadium: Estadio Francisco Morazán

26 May 1974	Municipal (Guatemala)	3–0 (4–0 agg.)	(Honduras) Marathón	Guatemala City
	José Emilio Mitrovich; Julio César Anderson			Stadium: Estadio Doroteo Guamuch Flores

(Guatemala) Municipal advance to the Second Round

5 May 1974	Alianza (El Salvador)	5–0	(Nicaragua) CD UCA	San Salvador
	Manuel Cañada; Miguel González; Roberto Guerra; Miguel Hermosilla; Ninon Osorio			Stadium: Estadio Flor Blanca

CD UCA (Nicaragua)	w/o (0–5 agg.)	(El Salvador) Alianza	San Salvador
	The 2nd leg of Alianza FC vs. Universidad Centroamericana was cancelled by mutual agreement, and the 1st leg results stood.		Stadium: Estadio Flor Blanca

(El Salvador) Alianza advanced to the Third Round

19 May 1974	Deportivo Santa Cecilia (Nicaragua)	4–1	(El Salvador) Negocios Internacionales	Diriamba
	Goal		Goal	Stadium: Estadio Colegio La Salle

26 May 1974	Negocios Internacionales (El Salvador)	4–0 (5–4 agg.)	(Nicaragua) Deportivo Santa Cecilia	San Salvador
	Goal			Stadium: Estadio Flor Blanca

(El Salvador) Negocios Internacionales advanced to the Second Round

=== Second round ===
Team 1	Agg.	Team 2	1st leg	2nd leg
Motagua (Honduras)	0–4	(Guatemala) Municipal	0–0	0–4
Aurora (Guatemala)	5–3	(El Salvador) Negocios Internacionales	3–1	2–2

- Alianza FC: Bye

21 June 1974	Motagua (Honduras)	0–0	(Guatemala) Municipal	Tegucigalpa, Honduras
				Stadium: Estadio Nacional Chelato Uclés

28 June 1974	Municipal (Guatemala)	4–0 (4–0 agg.)	(Honduras) Motagua	Guatemala City, Guatemala
	Emilio Mitrovich; Cesar Anderson; Raul Benitez			Stadium: Estadio Doroteo Guamuch Flores

(Guatemala) Municipal advance to the Fourth Round

22 June 1974	Aurora (Guatemala)	3–1	(El Salvador) Negocios Internacionales	Guatemala City, Guatemala
	René Morales; Selvin Pennant		Goal	Stadium: Estadio Doroteo Guamuch Flores

28 June 1974	Negocios Internacionales (El Salvador)	2–2 (3–5 agg.)	(Guatemala) Aurora	San Salvador, El Salvador
	Mauricio Meneses; Ricardo Sosa		Carlos Diaz; René Morales	Stadium: Estadio Flor Blanca

(Guatemala) Aurora advanced to the Third Round

=== Third round ===
Team 1	Agg.	Team 2	1st leg	2nd leg
Aurora (Guatemala)	2–4	(El Salvador) Alianza	2–3	0–1

- Municipal: Bye

21 August 1974	Aurora (Guatemala)	2–3	(El Salvador) Alianza	Guatemala City
	Goal		Hugo Ottensen; Miguel Gonzalez	Stadium: Estadio Doroteo Guamuch Flores

1 September 1974	Alianza (El Salvador)	1–0 (4–2 agg.)	(Guatemala) Aurora	San Salvador, El Salvador
	Manuel Canadas			Stadium: Estadio Flor Blanca

(El Salvador) Alianza FC advance to the fourth round.

=== Fourth round ===
Team 1	Agg.	Team 2	1st leg	2nd leg
Alianza (El Salvador)	0–3	(Guatemala) Municipal	0–1	0–2

29 September 1974	Alianza (El Salvador)	0–1	(Guatemala) Municipal	San Salvador, El Salvador
			Goal	Stadium: Estadio Flor Blanca

6 October 1974	Municipal (Guatemala)	2–0 (3–0 agg.)	(El Salvador) Alianza	Guatemala City, Guatemala
	Raúl Washington Benítez; Felipe Carias			Stadium: Estadio Doroteo Guamuch Flores

(Guatemala) Municipal advances to the CONCACAF Final.

== Caribbean Zone ==
=== First round ===
Team 1	Agg.	Team 2	1st leg	2nd leg
Jong Colombia (Netherlands Antilles)	3–2	(Suriname (Kingdom of the Netherlands)) Robinhood	2–2	1–0
Transvaal (Suriname (Kingdom of the Netherlands))	12–1	(Netherlands Antilles) Real Rincon	6–1	6–0

Jong Colombia (Netherlands Antilles)	2–2	(Suriname (Kingdom of the Netherlands)) Robinhood

Robinhood (Suriname (Kingdom of the Netherlands))	0–1 (2–3 agg.)	(Netherlands Antilles) Jong Colombia

(Netherlands Antilles) Jong Colombia advance to second round.

Transvaal (Suriname (Kingdom of the Netherlands))	6–1	(Netherlands Antilles) Real Rincon

Real Rincon (Netherlands Antilles)	0–6 (1–12 agg.)	(Suriname (Kingdom of the Netherlands)) Transvaal

(Suriname (Kingdom of the Netherlands)) Transvaal advanced to the second round

=== Second round ===
Team 1	Agg.	Team 2	1st leg	2nd leg
Jong Colombia (Netherlands Antilles)	3–5	(Suriname (Kingdom of the Netherlands)) Transvaal	1–2	2–3

Jong Colombia (Netherlands Antilles)	1–2	(Suriname (Kingdom of the Netherlands)) Transvaal

Transvaal (Suriname (Kingdom of the Netherlands))	3–2 (5–3 agg.)	(Netherlands Antilles) Jong Colombia

(Suriname (Kingdom of the Netherlands)) Transvaal advances to the CONCACAF Final.

== Final ==
=== First leg ===
1974 CONCACAF Champions' Cup Final
October 24, 1974
First leg

Transvaal (Suriname (Kingdom of the Netherlands))	1–2	(Guatemala) Municipal
Roy Vanenburg 55'	Report	Cesar Anderson 48'; Raul Benítez 75'

Mateo Flores, Guatemala City

=== Second leg ===
October 27, 1974
Second leg

Municipal (Guatemala)	2–1	(Suriname (Kingdom of the Netherlands)) Transvaal
Mitrovich 33', 73'	Report	Vanenburg 43' (pen.)

Mateo Flores, Guatemala City
Referee: Javier Galindo (Mexico)

Municipal won 4–0 on points, and 4–2 on goal difference.

Team details

Municipal
Transvaal

GK	(Guatemala) Adrián Lorenzo Fernández
DF	(Guatemala) Leonardo McNish
DF	(Guatemala) Carlos Monterroso
DF	(Guatemala) Lijón León
DF	(Guatemala) Armando Melgar Retolaza
MF	(Guatemala) Benjamín Monterroso
MF	(Guatemala) Miguel Ángel Pérez
MF	(Uruguay) Raúl W. Benítez
FW	(Argentina) José Emilio Mitrovich
FW	(Argentina) Miguel Ángel Cobián	Substituted off
FW	(Guatemala) Julio César Anderson
Substitutions:
FW	(Guatemala) Carlos Valdez	Substituted on
Manager:
(Uruguay) Rubén Amorín

GK	(Suriname (Kingdom of the Netherlands)) Emile Barron
DF	(Suriname (Kingdom of the Netherlands)) Goodrrief
DF	(Suriname (Kingdom of the Netherlands)) Gesser
DF	(Suriname (Kingdom of the Netherlands)) Fraam
DF	(Suriname (Kingdom of the Netherlands)) Regilio Doest
MF	(Suriname (Kingdom of the Netherlands)) Roy Vanenburg
MF	(Suriname (Kingdom of the Netherlands)) Gerrit Waal
MF	(Suriname (Kingdom of the Netherlands)) Headley	Substituted off
MF	(Suriname (Kingdom of the Netherlands)) Edwin Schal
FW	(Suriname (Kingdom of the Netherlands)) Wensley Bundel
FW	(Suriname (Kingdom of the Netherlands)) Humphrey Castillion	Substituted off
Substitutions:
FW	(Suriname (Kingdom of the Netherlands)) Theo Klein	Substituted on
FW	(Suriname (Kingdom of the Netherlands)) Schenlers	Substituted on
Manager:
(Suriname (Kingdom of the Netherlands)) Jules Lagadeau

== Champion ==
CONCACAF Champions' Cup
1974 Champion
(Guatemala)
Municipal
First title
