= Harald Reumel =

Surinamese footballer

Personal information
- Full name: Harald Reumel
- Place of birth: Albina, Surinam
- Position: Forward

Senior career*
Years	Team	Apps	(Gls)
1961–1963	TGG	?	(?)
1963–1981	Transvaal	?	(?)

International career^{‡}
1963–1966	Surinam	8	(3)
- * Club domestic league appearances and goals as of (21:04, 7 January 2016 (UTC)) ‡ National team caps and goals as of (21:04, 7 January 2016 (UTC))

Harald Reumel, known by his nickname Brammerloo is a former Surinamese football player, who played in the Surinamese Hoofdklasse for The Goal Getters and S.V. Transvaal, and for the Suriname national team. He spent most of his professional playing career with S.V. Transvaal, winning six consecutive national titles, and two CONCACAF Champions Cup, finishing as the league top scorer in 1966.

== Career ==
=== TGG ===
Reumel began his football career in 1961, playing for The Goal Getters (TGG) from Moengo, before joining S.V. Transvaal in the capital Paramaribo in 1963.

=== SV Transvaal ===
At Transvaal he became known as one third of the infamous trio together with Roy Vanenburg and Edwin Schal. The club dominated the league, winning six consecutive national titles from 1965 to 1970. The 1966 season saw Reumel finish as league top goal scorer. He helped Transvaal to qualify for the 1968 CONCACAF Champions' Cup, facing Aurora F.C. from Guatemala in the semi-finals, where they would be eliminated after a brawl between the supporters of both teams. In 1971, he helped Transvaal to win their first CONCACAF Champions' Cup, becoming the first Surinamese club to win the Continental title by defeating CRKSV Jong Colombia from the Netherlands Antilles 4–2 on aggregate score in the final, Transvaal would also win the national title that same year undefeated.

Transvaal won the national title again the following year, earning the team another berth in the Champions Cup. Making it to the finals once more, Transvaal finished as runners-up in the competition, losing to Atlético Español from Mexico 5–1 on aggregate score in the final. In 1981 Reumel helped Transvaal to the 1981 CONCACAF Champions' Cup finals once more, winning the title 2–1 on aggregate score against C.D. Atlético Marte from El Salvador.

Considered one of the best football players in the clubs' history, Reumel helped his team secure six national titles, and two CONCACAF Champions Cup trophies during the span of his career, while finishing as the league top goal scorer once.

== International career ==
=== Suriname ===
Reumel played for the Suriname national team. He made his debut on 13 October 1963, playing in the qualifiers for the 1964 Summer Olympics, against the Netherlands Antilles with the match ending in a 3–0 win, and Reumel scoring on his debut. He scored his second goal in the qualifiers against Panama, scoring the third goal in a 6–1 win. He also played a part in the country's 1966 FIFA World Cup qualifying campaign, having also played in the 1966 Coupe Duvalier in Port-au-Prince, Haiti.

== Career statistics ==
=== International goals ===
Scores and results list Suriname' goal tally first.

Goal	Date	Venue	Opponent	Score	Result	Competition
1.	13 October 1963	National Stadion, Paramaribo, Suriname	Netherlands Antilles	3–0	3–0	1964 Summer Olympics qualification
2.	20 March 1964	Estadio Olímpico Universitario, Mexico City, Mexico	Panama	3–1	6–1	1964 Summer Olympics qualification
3.	25 July 1965	National Stadion, Paramaribo, Suriname	French Guiana	7–0	7–0	International friendly

== Honors ==
=== Club ===
S.V. Transvaal

- SVB Hoofdklasse (6): 1967, 1968, 1969, 1970, 1973, 1974
- CONCACAF Champions Cup (2): 1973, 1981

=== Individual ===
- SVB Hoofdklasse Top Goalscorer (1): 1966
