= Roy Vanenburg =

Surinamese footballer and manager

Personal information
- Date of birth: 1948 (age 77–78)
- Place of birth: Paramaribo, Surinam
- Position: Midfielder

Youth career
- 1961–1963: Ajax
- 1963–1964: NAKS

Senior career*
Years	Team	Apps	(Gls)
1964–1965	Hercules		
1965–1967	Robinhood		
1967–1981	Transvaal		

International career
1965–1981	Suriname	10	(4)

Managerial career
- 1981–?: Transvaal
- Takdier Boys
- Paloeloe
- SNL
- 2006–2007: FCS Nacional
- 2007–2010: WBC
- 2011–2012: Robinhood
- 2012–2014: Notch
- 2014–2016: Transvaal
- * Club domestic league appearances and goals

Roy Vanenburg (born 1948) is a Surinamese football manager and former player, who was last manager of Hoofdklasse club Transvaal. He spent most of his professional playing career with S.V. Transvaal, winning six Hoofdklasse titles, and two CONCACAF Champions Cups, finishing as the league top scorer in both 1968 and in 1971. He had previously played for H.V.V. and S.V. Robinhood before joining Transvaal in 1967.

After retiring from playing, he went into management with Transvaal. followed by spells with Takdier Boys, Paloeloe, SNL, FCS Nacional, Walking Boyz Company, SV Robinhood and SV Notch. With Walking Boyz Company he managed to win the National title, the Surinamese Cup and the Suriname President's Cup all in 2009.

He is the uncle of former Dutch International football player and manager Gerald Vanenburg.

== Club career ==
=== Early career ===
Vanenburg began his football career in 1961, at age 13, on the Mr. Bronsplein, in Paramaribo, Surinam, playing in the youth ranks of V.V. Ajax. In 1963 he joined NAKS, playing for Jong NAKS in the youth league, receiving guidance from the likes of Frits Purperhart and Imro Pengel, before transferring to Hercules a year later.

=== Hercules ===
In 1964, Vanenburg joined Hercules Voetbal Vereniging, making his debut in the Surinamese Hoofdklasse at age 16. While at Hercules he would play with the likes of Rinaldo Krenten, Franklin ‘Jeep’ Kranenburg and George Barron, reputable players in the competition at the time. His performance earned him a move to S.V. Robinhood a year later, transferring in November 1965.

=== Robinhood ===
From 1965 to 1967, Vannenburg played for SV Robinhood. His performance earned him the captain arm band, at the Kingdom Games in 1966, playing for the Surinamese national team. Vanenburg subsequently transferred to Transvaal, the dominating club in Suriname at the time, a year later.

=== Transvaal ===
Vanenburg played the remainder of his career for Transvaal, where he would play with Wensley Bundel and Pauli Corte in the midfield in the sixties. In 1968, he finished as the league top scorer together with teammate Edwin Schal with 14 goals each. In 1971, he finished as the league top scorer once more with 16 goals. Together with Harald Reumel and Schal, he formed a trio that posed a major threat for the opponents. 1973 proved to be the most successful year for Vanenburg, helping his side to win the CONCACAF Champions Cup, thus becoming the first Surinamese club to win the Continental title by defeating CRKSV Jong Colombia from the Netherlands Antilles 4–2 on aggregate score in the final, Transvaal would also win the national title that same year undefeated.

Transvaal won the national title again the following year, earning the team another berth in the Champions Cup. Making it to the finals once more, Transvaal finished as runners-up in the competition, losing to Atlético Español from Mexico 5–1 on aggregate score in the final. In 1981 Vanenburg helped Transvaal to the 1981 CONCACAF Champions' Cup finals once more, winning the title 2–1 on aggregate score against Atlético Marte from El Salvador.

Considered one of the greatest football players in the clubs' history, Vanenburg helped his team secure six national titles, and two CONCACAF Champions Cup trophies during the span of his career, while finishing as the league top goal scorer twice.

== International career ==
=== Suriname ===
Vanenburg played for the Suriname national team. He made his debut in 1965 and became the team captain in the 1966 Kingdom Games a year later. He scored his first International goal against the Netherlands on 14 August 1966, scoring the equalizer in a 1–1 draw. He played an important role in the countries 1970 and 1978 FIFA World Cup qualifying campaigns, also helping his team to win the 1978 CFU Championship.

== Managerial career ==
In 1981, Vanenburg retired as a player, taking a coaching position with Transvaal. He later coached Takdier Boys, Paloeloe and SV SNL in the Surinamese Hoofdklasse. From 2006 to 2007 he managed FCS Nacional, followed by four seasons managing the Walking Boyz Company. In 2009, he would help the club to win the National championship, the Surinamese Cup and the Suriname President's Cup.

In 2011, he took over as manager of SV Robinhood, parting ways with the club, halfway through his second season, in 2012 he took over the position at SV Notch where he stayed until 2014, returning to SV Transvaal the following year. In December 2015 the club changed ownership and Vanenburg was relieved of his managerial duties, being replaced by Dennis Baino.

== Personal life ==
Vanenburg is the uncle of Dutch International football player Gerald Vanenburg. Born in Utrecht, his nephew would go on to have a successful career in Europe, winning the 1988 UEFA European Championship with the Netherlands, while winning the Dutch Golden Boot award two consecutive seasons (1988 and 1989). His Nephew also helped PSV Eindhoven to win the European Cup in 1988.

== Career statistics ==
Scores and results list Suriname' goal tally first.

Goal	Date	Venue	Opponent	Score	Result	Competition
1.	14 August 1966	National Stadion, Paramaribo, Suriname	Netherlands	1–1	1–1	1966 Kingdom Games
2.	14 April 1968	Stade d'Honneur de Dillon, Fort-de-France, Martinique	Martinique	1–1	2–3	International friendly
3.	24 November 1968	National Stadion, Paramaribo, Suriname	Netherlands Antilles	5–0	6–0	1970 FIFA World Cup qualification
4.	24 November 1968	National Stadion, Paramaribo, Suriname	Netherlands Antilles	6–0	6–0	1970 FIFA World Cup qualification

== Honors ==
=== Player ===
Transvaal

- SVB Hoofdklasse (6): 1967, 1968, 1969, 1970, 1973, 1974
- CONCACAF Champions Cup: 1973, 1981

Suriname

- CFU Championship: 1978

Individual

- SVB Hoofdklasse top goalscorer: 1968 (joint), 1971

=== Manager ===
FCS Nacional

- Royal Cup: 2006

Walking Boyz Company

- SVB Hoofdklasse: 2009
- Beker van Suriname: 2009
- Suriname President's Cup: 2009
- Paramaribo Cup: 2007, 2008
