= Jules Lagadeau =

Surinamese footballer (1939–2019)

Personal information
- Full name: Jules Theodorus Lagadeau
- Place of birth: Paramaribo, Surinam
- Position: Forward

Youth career
- Benjamin Boys

Senior career*
Years	Team	Apps	(Gls)
1955–1968	Transvaal		

International career
1959–1968	Suriname	15	(2)

Managerial career
- 1968: Transvaal
- * Club domestic league appearances and goals

Jules Theodorus Lagadeau (31 July 1939 – 27 August 2019) was a Surinamese football player and manager who played for S.V. Transvaal in the Hoofdklasse and for the Suriname national team.

== Club career ==
Lagadeau was born 1939 in Paramaribo. He grew up playing for the Benjamin Boys on the Mr. Bronsplein. As an admirer of local star Humphrey Mijnals, Lagadeau joined S.V. Robinhood but parted ways with the club soon after his idol left to play professionally in the Netherlands, joining S.V. Transvaal shortly thereafter. In 1963 he went on a three-month trial period with Eredivisie club PSV Eindhoven, and in 1965 he was on trial for three months with F.C. Dom Basil from Trinidad and Tobago.

At Transvaal he was the team captain leading the club to five national championships in 1962, 1965, 1966, 1967 and 1968. His final season as a player he led Transvaal to the final of the 1968 CONCACAF Champions' Cup after defeating Aurora F.C. from Guatemala. However after fans invaded the pitch, Transvaal were disqualified finishing as runner-up in the tournament and Toluca from Mexico winning the cup.

== International career ==
Lagadeau made his debut for the Suriname national team at the age of 19 on 4 January 1959 in a friendly match against Swedish club Malmö FF. On 20 September 1959, he made his official debut in a friendly match against Martinique. The match ended in a 1–0 win at the National Stadium. Another highlight of his first year with the national team was the 2–2 draw against the Netherlands Antilles, which was the first time the national team did not lose when playing in Curaçao. He was a part of the team that made a fourth place finish at the 1960 CCCF Championship in Cuba. Playing alongside Gerrit Niekoop, Leo Marcet and Siegfried Haltman, Lagadeau scored his first goals on 22 December 1968 against El Salvador in a 4–1 win at home.

== Managerial career ==
After his playing career Lagadeau took over as manager of S.V. Transvaal, seceding Ronald Kolf who had left to take over at S.V. Robinhood. Lagadeau successfully led Transvaal to four consecutive national titles. The 1973 season was his most successful as a manager, going undefeated in winning the national championship, while winning the 1973 CONCACAF Champions' Cup, the first Continental title won by a club from Suriname.

== Career statistics ==
Scores and results list Suriname' goal tally first.

Goal	Date	Venue	Opponent	Score	Result	Competition
1.	22 December 1968	National Stadion, Paramaribo, Suriname	El Salvador	1–1	4–1	1970 FIFA World Cup qualification
2.	22 December 1968	National Stadion, Paramaribo, Suriname	El Salvador	2–1	4–1	1970 FIFA World Cup qualification

== Honours ==
=== Player ===
S.V. Transvaal

- SVB Hoofdklasse: 1962, 1965, 1966, 1967, 1968
- CONCACAF Champions' Cup runner-up: 1968

Suriname

- CCCF Championship fourth place: 1960

=== Manager ===
S.V. Transvaal

- SVB Hoofdklasse: 1969, 1970, 1973, 1974
- CONCACAF Champions' Cup: 1973
