= Adrián Lorenzo Fernández =

Guatemalan footballer (1943–2026)

Personal information
- Date of birth: 19 September 1943
- Place of birth: Antigua Guatemala, Guatemala
- Date of death: 17 May 2026 (aged 82)
- Position: Goalkeeper

Senior career*
Years	Team	Apps	(Gls)
1963–1964	Antigua		
1965	Universidad de San Carlos		
1966–1971	Tipografía Nacional		
1972–1974	Municipal		
1975	Juventud Retalteca		
1976	Deportivo Tiquisate		

International career
- Guatemala
Medal record
Men's football
Representing Guatemala
CONCACAF Championship
Runner-up	1969 Costa Rica
- * Club domestic league appearances and goals

Adrián Lorenzo Fernández (19 September 1943 – 17 May 2026), also known as Chito Fernández, was a Guatemalan footballer who played as a goalkeeper.

== Career ==
In 1974, Fernández was part of the Municipal side that won the CONCACAF Champions' Cup against Surinamese side Transvaal, as part of their 1974 treble which included the Liga Nacional and the Copa Fraternidad.

He was part of the Guatemala national team's squad at the 1969 CONCACAF Championship in Costa Rica, where they finished as runners-up.

== Death ==
Fernández died on 17 May 2026, at the age of 82.
