= 1970 CONCACAF Champions' Cup =

6th edition of premier club football tournament organized by CONCACAF

Copa de Campeones Concacaf

Tournament details
- Dates: 26 April – 5 June
- Teams: 12 (from 12 associations)

Final positions
- Champions: (Mexico) Cruz Azul (2nd title)

The 1970 CONCACAF Champions' Cup was the 6th edition of the annual international club association football competition held in the CONCACAF region (North America, Central America and the Caribbean), the CONCACAF Champions' Cup

It was played from 26 April to 5 June 1970 under the home/away match system. The teams were split into three zones (North American, Central American and Caribbean), each qualifying the winner to the final tournament. The final tournament was not held and Cruz Azul were declared CONCACAF Champions after Deportivo Saprissa and SV Transvaal withdrew.

Cruz Azul from Mexico won the competition for the second time in their history, having also won the 1969 Champions' Cup the previous year.

== North American Zone ==
30 June 1970 1st leg	NY Greek Americans (United States)	0–1	(Mexico) Cruz Azul	New York City, United States
EST			76' Muciño

12 July 1970 2nd leg	Cruz Azul (Mexico)	5–0	(United States) NY Greek Americans	Mexico City, Mexico
CST	Muciño 12' 58'; Bidalis 16' (o.g.); Guerrero 77' 87'			Stadium: Estadio Olímpico

- Cruz Azul won 6–0 on aggregate score.

== Central American Zone ==
=== First round ===
Torneo Centroamericano de Concacaf 1970 Group A

Pos	Team	Pld	W	D	L	GF	GA	GD	Pts	Qualification
1	(Costa Rica) Saprissa	4	3	1	0	15	2	+13	7	Central American Zone final round
2	(El Salvador) Atlético Marte	4	2	1	1	10	5	+5	5	
3	(Nicaragua) Diriangén	4	0	0	4	1	19	−18	0	

26 April 1970	Atlético Marte (El Salvador)	5–0	(Nicaragua) Diriangén	San Salvador, El Salvador
CST	Elenilson Franco			Stadium: Estadio Flor Blanca

28 April 1970	Diriangén (Nicaragua)	1–3	(El Salvador) Atlético Marte	Diriamba, Nicaragua
CST	TBD		Elenilson Franco; Sergio Mendez	Stadium: Estadio Colegio La Salle

3 May 1970	Atlético Marte (El Salvador)	1–1	(Costa Rica) Saprissa	San Salvador, El Salvador
CST	Elenilson Franco 34'		Luis Aguilar 57'	Stadium: Estadio Flor Blanca

12 May 1970	Saprissa (Costa Rica)	3–1	(El Salvador) Atlético Marte	San José, Costa Rica
CST	Luis Aguilar 30'; Jimenez 35' 57'		Ricardo Sepulveda 75'	Stadium: Estadio Nacional de Costa Rica

24 May 1970	Saprissa (Costa Rica)	9–0	(Nicaragua) Diriangén	San José, Costa Rica
CST	Umaña 13'; Marín 25' 50'; Chico 27' (pen.); Aguilar 42' 78'; Heriberto 55'; Jiménez 67'; Grant 74'			Stadium: Estadio Nacional de Costa Rica

31 May 1970	Diriangén (Nicaragua)	0–2	(Costa Rica) Saprissa	Diriamba, Nicaragua
CST			Edgar Marin	Stadium: Estadio Colegio La Salle

- Saprissa advance to final round.

Group B

17 May 1970	Olimpia (Honduras)	3–2	(Guatemala) Municipal	Tegucigalpa, Honduras
CST	Urquía; Brand; Suazo		Toninho; López	Stadium: Estadio Tiburcio Carías Andino

24 May 1970	Municipal (Guatemala)	0–0	(Honduras) Olimpia	Guatemala City, Guatemala
CST				Stadium: Estadio Mateo Flores

- Olimpia won 3–2 on aggregate score.

=== Final Round ===
21 June 1970	Saprissa (Costa Rica)	1–0	(Honduras) Olimpia	San José, Costa Rica
CST	TBD			Stadium: Estadio Nacional de Costa Rica

5 July 1970	Olimpia (Honduras)	1–4	(Costa Rica) Saprissa	Tegucigalpa, Honduras
CST	Urquía 12'		10' Grant; 15' Ruiz; 46' Marín; 90' Aguilar	Stadium: Estadio Tiburcio Carías Andino

- Saprissa won 5–1 on aggregate score and advance to final round.

== Caribbean Zone ==
=== First round ===
9 June 1970	Transvaal (Suriname (Kingdom of the Netherlands))	2–0	(Trinidad and Tobago) Maple	Paramaribo, Suriname
SRT				Stadium: André Kamperveen Stadion

14 June 1970	Maple (Trinidad and Tobago)	1–2	(Suriname (Kingdom of the Netherlands)) Transvaal	Port of Spain, Trinidad and Tobago
AST	TBD		Edwin Schal; Harald Reumel “Brammerloo”

- Transvaal won 4–1 on aggregate score.

3 July 1970	SUBT (Netherlands Antilles)	2–5	(Haiti) Racing Haïtien	Willemstad, Netherlands Antilles
AST				Stadium: Stadion dr. Antoine Maduro

5 July 1970	Racing Haïtien (Haiti)	1–1	(Netherlands Antilles) SUBT	Port-au-Prince, Haiti
EST				Stadium: Stade Sylvio Cator

- Racing Haïtien won 6–3 on aggregate score.

=== Second round ===
Team 1	Score	Team 2
Racing Haïtien (Haiti)	?–?	(Jamaica) Santos

- Unknown results; Santos wins round.

=== Final Round ===
20 September 1970	Santos (Jamaica)	0–2	(Suriname (Kingdom of the Netherlands)) Transvaal	Kingston, Jamaica
EST			Vanenburg; Corte

27 September 1970	Transvaal (Suriname (Kingdom of the Netherlands))	3–1	(Jamaica) Santos	Paramaribo, Suriname
SRT	Corte; Lagadeau; Vanenburg		Campbell	Stadium: André Kamperveen Stadion

- Transvaal won 5–1 on aggregate score.

== Semi-finals ==
The semi-finals and final were scratched and Cruz Azul were declared CONCACAF Champions after Deportivo Saprissa and Transvaal both withdrew.

== Champion ==
CONCACAF Champions' Cup
1970 Champions
(Mexico)
Cruz Azul
Second title
