= Edwin Schal =

Surinamese footballer (born 1943)

Personal information
- Full name: Edwien Reinier Schal
- Date of birth: October 3, 1943 (age 83)
- Place of birth: Paramaribo, Surinam
- Position: Forward

Youth career
- Tuna
- Transvaal

Senior career*
Years	Team	Apps	(Gls)
1966–1981	Transvaal	?	(?)

International career^{‡}
1976	Suriname Olympic	2	(2)
1966–1977	Suriname	19	(8)
- * Club domestic league appearances and goals as of December 15, 2015 ‡ National team caps and goals as of December 15, 2015

Edwien Reinier Schal (born October 3, 1943), known as Wiene Schal is a retired Surinamese footballer who started his career as a forward for SV Transvaal in the Hoofdklasse, and for the Suriname national team. A striker for the majority of his career, he was utilized more as defender towards the end of his career. He is considered one of the greatest footballers in the countries history, having captained SV Transvaal to two CONCACAF Champions Cups and five national titles, in what is considered the golden age of the club's history.

== Career ==
Schal started his career in Paramaribo, Suriname on the Plein van 12 Mei, playing in the youth ranks of S.V. Tuna, before transferring to S.V. Transvaal. He progressed through the youth ranks of Transvaal, playing for the reserves' team before making his debut for the first team in 1966. As one of the countries most prolific strikers, he helped Tarnsvaal to become the first regional champion of the Caribbean, leading Transvaal to the semi-finals of the 1970 CONCACAF Champions' Cup before the team withdrew from the tournament. In 1973, In 1973, S.V. Transvaal clinched the SVB Hoofdklasse national title undefeated, also winning the Caribbean Championship and the 1973 CONCACAF Champions' Cup after Costa Rica side Saprissa withdrew from the tournament. Schal finished the season as the top scorer of the Hoofdklasse with 20 goals, a feat he had accomplished 1968 together with his teammate Roy Vanenburg with 14 goals each.

As the team captain for S.V. Transvaal for 15 years, Schal helped his side to five national titles in 1968, 1969, 1970, 1973 and 1974, while winning the Surinamese Footballer of the Year award twice, in 1968 and 1972. He also won the CONCACAF Champions' Cup twice, once more in 1981 when Transvaal defeated C.D. Atlético Marte from El Salvador 2-1 on aggregate score in the final.

== International career ==
Schal made his debut for the Suriname national team on 10 June 1966 at the Coupe Duvalier tournament against Trinidad and Tobago in a 3–2 loss at the Sylvio Cator Stadium in Port-au-Prince, Haiti. He scored his first goal against Haiti three days later in a 4–1 win. Suriname eventually finished as runners-up in the tournament. He played an integral role in the countries 1970, 1974 and 1978 FIFA World Cup qualification campaigns, and in 1978 helped Suriname to win the CFU Championship hosted in Trinidad and Tobago.

In 1976, Schal played for the Suriname Olympic team, competing in two matches against the Olympic team of Trinidad and Tobago while scoring twice.

== Career statistics ==
=== International goals ===
Scores and results list Suriname' goal tally first.

Goal	Date	Venue	Opponent	Score	Result	Competition
1.	13 June 1966	Sylvio Cator Stadium, Port-au-Prince, Haiti	Haiti	3–1	4–1	1966 Coupe Duvalier
2.	15 June 1966	Sylvio Cator Stadium, Port-au-Prince, Haiti	Guadeloupe	1–0	4–0	1966 Coupe Duvalier
3.	15 June 1966	Sylvio Cator Stadium, Port-au-Prince, Haiti	Guadeloupe	2–0	4–0	1966 Coupe Duvalier
4.	17 June 1966	Sylvio Cator Stadium, Port-au-Prince, Haiti	Jamaica	3–2	5–3	1966 Coupe Duvalier
5.	22 December 1968	André Kamperveen Stadion, Paramaribo, Dutch Guyana	El Salvador	4–1	4–1	1970 FIFA World Cup qualification
6.	3 December 1972	Antigua Recreation Ground, St. John's, Antigua and Barbuda	Antigua and Barbuda	3–0	6–0	1974 FIFA World Cup qualification
7.	3 December 1972	Antigua Recreation Ground, St. John's, Antigua and Barbuda	Antigua and Barbuda	4–0	6–0	1974 FIFA World Cup qualification
8.	10 August 1975	André Kamperveen Stadion, Paramaribo, Suriname	Trinidad and Tobago	2–0	2–0	1976 Summer Olympics qualification
9.	24 August 1975	Queen's Park Oval, Port of Spain, Trinidad and Tobago	Trinidad and Tobago	1–1	1–1	1976 Summer Olympics qualification
10.	8 October 1977	Estadio Universitario, Monterrey, Mexico	Guatemala	1–0	2–3	1978 FIFA World Cup qualification

== Honors ==
=== Club ===
S.V. Transvaal

- SVB Hoofdklasse (5): 1968, 1969, 1970, 1973, 1974
- CONCACAF Champions' Cup (2): 1973, 1981

=== International ===
Suriname

- CFU Championship (1): 1978

=== Individual ===
- Surinamese Sportsman of the Year (1): 1968
- Surinamese Footballer of the Year (2): 1968, 1972
- SVB Hoofdklasse Top Goalscorer (2): 1968 (joint), 1973
