= Wensley Bundel =

Surinamese footballer (1948–2024)

Personal information
- Full name: Wensley Rinaldo Bundel
- Date of birth: 26 June 1948
- Place of birth: Paramaribo, Surinam
- Date of death: 2 June 2024 (aged 75)
- Position: Midfielder

Senior career*
Years	Team	Apps	(Gls)
1968–1982	Transvaal		

International career
1970–1978	Suriname	6	(0)

Managerial career
- 20??–2003: House Of Billiards
- 2005: Suriname
- 2007–2008: Suriname U19
- 2008–2010: Suriname
- 2010–2014: Transvaal
Medal record
Men's association football
Representing Suriname
CFU Championship
Gold medal – first place	1978 Trinidad and Tobago	Team
- * Club domestic league appearances and goals

Wensley Rinaldo Bundel (26 June 1948 – 2 June 2024) was a Surinamese football manager and player.

As a player, he played in the Hoofdklasse for Transvaal, and for the Suriname national team, helping Transvaal to five national titles, and two CONCACAF Champions Cups, during one of the club's most successful periods. He also managed House Of Billiards, Transvaal and the Suriname national team during the span of his career. He also helped Suriname to win the CFU Championship in 1978.

== Club career ==
Bundel began his football career in Paramaribo, playing with Transvaal in the SVB Hoofdklasse, the top flight of football in Suriname. He played in the midfield with Roy Vanenburg and Pauli Corte in the sixties. He was best friends with Roy George, of arch rivals S.V. Robinhood except for on the pitch, where competition was fierce. In 1973, Transvaal went undefeated, winning the league title, as well as the CONCACAF Champions Cup, the first for a Surinamese club. They defeated CRKSV Jong Colombia from the Netherlands Antilles 4–2 on aggregate score in the final. In 1974, Transvaal won the league title again, and in 1975 they finished as runners-up in the CONCACAF Champions Cup, losing to Atlético Español from Mexico 5–1 on aggregate score in the final. He also helped Transvaal to the 1981 CONCACAF Champions' Cup finals once more, winning the title 2–1 on aggregate score against Atlético Marte from El Salvador. On 10 January 1982, he played in a friendly match between Transvaal and Ajax, which ended in a 3–0 loss at the National Stadion.

== International career ==
Bundel played for the Suriname national team. He made his debut on 4 October 1970 in a 3–2 win against Trinidad and Tobago, in a friendly match hosted at the National Stadion. He played an important role in the country's 1970 and 1978 FIFA World Cup qualifying campaigns, also helping his team to win the 1978 CFU Championship.

== Managerial career ==
After his playing career, Bundel started in coaching. He was the manager for House Of Billiards, competing in the Hoofdklasse in 2003. In 2005, Bundel coached the Suriname national team at the annual Suriprofs Tournament in Amsterdam, finishing in second place.

In 2007, he coached the Suriname national under-19 team to a first place finish at the Inter-Guyana Games. In 2008, he became the manager of the Suriname national team, ahead of the nations' 2010 FIFA World Cup qualifying campaign. He also managed the team for the 2008 and 2010 Caribbean Cup qualifiers, and the 2010 Parbo Bier Cup.

In 2010, he became the manager of his former club Transvaal. After four turbulent seasons, and with the club at one point nearly facing relegation, Bundel resigned in 2014. He was succeeded by former Transvaal player Jimmy Letnom.

== Personal life and death ==
Bundel was the father of former Surinamese International Rosano Bundel who also played for Transvaal. On 24 March 2012, his son was sentenced to life in prison for the murder of George Tabetando in Atlanta, Georgia, United States, in what was known as the Cumberland Mall shootings of 2011. He was 28.

Wensley Bundel died on 2 June 2024, at the age of 75.

== Honours ==
=== Player ===
Transvaal

- SVB Hoofdklasse: 1968, 1969, 1970, 1973, 1974
- CONCACAF Champions Cup: 1973, 1981

Suriname

- CFU Championship: 1978

=== Coach ===
Suriname U19

- Inter-Guyana Games: 2007
