= Emile Barron =

Surinamese footballer

Personal information
- Full name: Ewald Emile Barron
- Date of birth: 10 April 1937 (age 89)
- Place of birth: Paramaribo, Surinam
- Date of death: 13 April 2015 (aged 78)
- Place of death: Amsterdam, Netherlands
- Position: Goalkeeper

Senior career*
Years	Team	Apps	(Gls)
1959–1976	Transvaal	?	(?)

International career^{‡}
1964–1975	Suriname	7	(0)
- * Club domestic league appearances and goals as of (18:15, 13 March 2016 (UTC)) ‡ National team caps and goals as of (18:15, 13 March 2016 (UTC))

Ewald Emile Barron (10 April 1937 – 13 April 2015) was a Surinamese footballer who played as a goalkeeper for S.V. Transvaal in the Surinamese Hoofdklasse and for the Suriname national team.

== Club career ==
Born in Paramaribo, Barron played for S.V. Transvaal in the Surinamese Hoofdklasse, becoming the first choice keeper in his first season with the first team in 1959. He won a total of 9 national championships with Transvaal, winning trophies in 1962, 1965 to 1970, 1973 and 1974. The Goalkeeper of the Year award in Suriname is awarded to the goalkeeper who concedes the fewest goals, with Barron winning the award on 6 occasions. From 1964 to 1968 and in 1970.

In 1968, Barron helped Transvaal to the finals of the CONCACAF Champions' Cup helping to beat Aurora F.C. from Guatemala 3–1 on aggregate score. The final against Toluca from Mexico however was cancelled, and Transvaal disqualified due to supporters of both clubs invading the pitch in a brawl during the semi-finals. In 1973, Barron helped Transvaal win the country's first CONCACAF Champions' Cup after both Costa Rican clubs L.D. Alajuelense and Saprissa withdrew in what would be the club's most successful season to date. That year Transvaal went on to win the Hoofdklasse undefeated, as well as going undefeated in the club's first successful continental race. Three years later Barron retired from football and moved to the Netherlands.

== International career ==
Barron has represented the Suriname national team during his career, having made his debut in 1959. He was the first choice keeper for the country's 1966 and 1970 FIFA World Cup qualification process. On 24 November 1968 he kept a clean sheet against the Netherlands Antilles in a 6–0 win at the National Stadion.

== Honours ==
=== Club ===
S.V. Transvaal

- Hoofdklasse (9): 1962, 1965, 1966, 1967, 1968, 1969, 1970, 1973, 1974
- CONCACAF Champions' Cup (1): 1973

=== Individual ===
- Surinamese Goalkeeper of the Year (6): 1964, 1965, 1966, 1967, 1968, 1970
