= Kingdom Games =

Multi-sport event in the Kingdom of the Netherlands

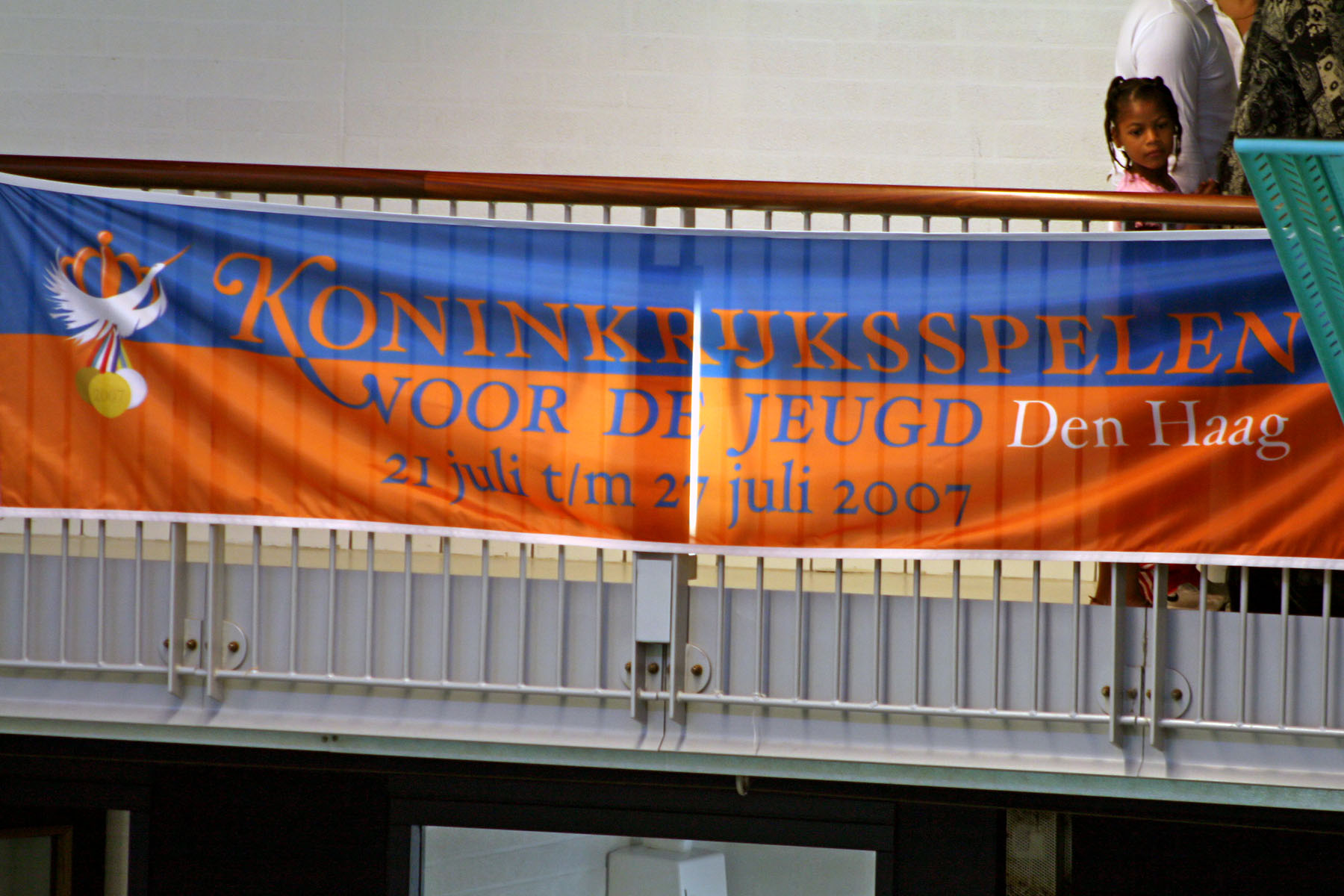
Flag at the 2007 Kingdom Games

The Kingdom Games (Dutch: Koninkrijksspelen, Papiamento: Weganan di Reino) was a multi-sport event, held every two years between the youth of the countries in the Kingdom of the Netherlands. At the final edition in 2009, these countries were the Netherlands, the Netherlands Antilles and Aruba. The 2010 dissolution of the Netherlands Antilles led to the cancellation of the 2011 and 2013 editions of the Games, and ultimately the Games were discontinued in 2014.

In addition to creating a sportive atmosphere, respect and fraternization were also central themes of the Games. The contact between the countries and their cultures was the main theme.

== History ==
The first ever Kingdom Games were held in 1965. It was an attempt to bring the parts of the Kingdom closer together. These parts were the Netherlands, Suriname and the Netherlands Antilles. In 1975, Suriname gained independence and did no longer take part in the Games. Between 1979 and 1983, the Games included the Netherlands and the Antilles. In 1995, the Games were refounded by former swimmer and politician Erica Terpstra to bring the youth of the countries closer together.

== Locations of the Games ==
- 1995: Aruba
- 1997: Curaçao (Netherlands Antilles)
- 1999: Sint Maarten (Netherlands Antilles)
- 2001: Rotterdam (Netherlands)
- 2003: Aruba
- 2005: Willemstad (Netherlands Antilles)
- 2007: The Hague (Netherlands)
- 2009: Aruba
- 2011: Curaçao – cancelled

== Popularity ==
In the Netherlands Antilles and Aruba, the Games were popular. In 2005, the Ergilio Hato-stadion in Curaçao was almost sold out during the opening ceremony. It was much less popular in the Netherlands. In 2007, the opening ceremony was not held in a stadium but at the Spuiplein. A few thousand people showed up, and the events were visited by several hundreds of people per day.

== Sports ==
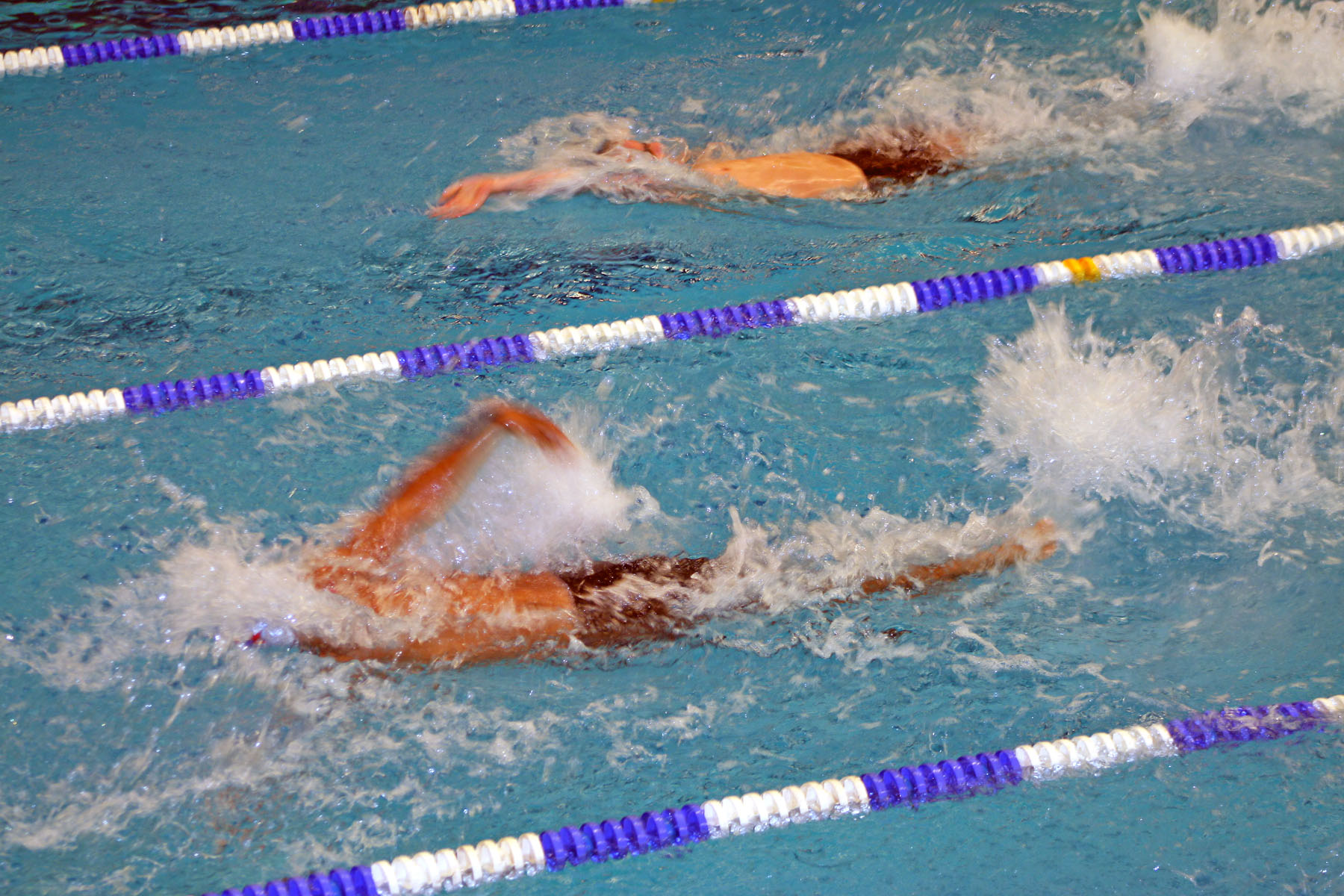
Two swimmers compete at the 2007 Kingdom Games

The following sports were scheduled at the Games:

- Baseball
- Bowling
- Football
- Judo
- Softball
- Swimming
- Tennis

The strength of the team of the Netherlands used to be adjusted to the strength of the other teams, because normally the level of the Dutch team would have been much higher compared to the other participants. The Dutch normally participated with regional teams or younger sportspeople to close the gap in quality.

== Participating teams ==
- Aruba
- Netherlands Antilles
- Netherlands
- Suriname – Participated between 1965 and 1975 until independence.
