= Dennis Baino =

Surinamese footballer

Personal information
- Date of birth: 12 January 1975 (age 51)
- Position: Midfielder

Senior career*
Years	Team	Apps	(Gls)
1996–1998	Transvaal		
1998–2000	Verbroedering Denderhoutem	42	(8)
2000–2002	Cappellen	58	(18)
2002–2004	KV Wevelgem City	54	(14)
2004–2006	Tournai	47	(7)
2006–2007	KSV Rumbeke	24	(5)
2007–2008	KV Wevelgem City	12	(3)
2008–2009	USV Elinkwijk		
Total		237	(55)

International career
1996–2004	Suriname		

Managerial career
- 2016–2017: Transvaal
- 2017–2018: Inter Moengotapoe
- 2017: Suriname U15
- * Club domestic league appearances and goals

Dennis Baino (born 12 January 1975) is a Surinamese former footballer who played at both professional and international levels as a midfielder.

== Playing career ==
Baino played club football in Suriname, Belgium and the Netherlands for Transvaal, Verbroedering Denderhoutem, Cappellen, KV Wevelgem City, Tournai, KSV Rumbeke and USV Elinkwijk.

He was also a member of the Suriname national team between 1996 and 2004, appearing in three FIFA World Cup qualifying matches.

== Managerial career ==
In January 2016, it was announced that Baino signed a two-year contract with Transvaal. His first official match was in 'De Klassieker'(the El Clasico of Suriname) between SV Robinhood and Transvaal. Baino reached the second place with Transvaal in the 2015–16 season. On 29 January 2017, the board of Transvaal decided to replace Baino, because after eight games played in the new Topklasse league in the 2016–17 season, he failed to keep the club in mid-table. In the same season, Baino went on to become the manager of Inter Moengotapoe winning the title. Later he became the manager of the Surinamese Under 15 side.

== Honours ==
=== As manager ===
- 2017 – Champion of Topklasse with Inter Moengotapoe
