= S.V. Transvaal =

Surinamese football club

Transvaal
- Full name: Sport Vereniging Transvaal
- Nicknames: Transie; Groen-Witte formatie (green-white formation)
- Founded: 15 January 1921; 105 years ago
- Ground: André Kamperveen Stadion; Paramaribo, Suriname
- Capacity: 7,100
- Owner: Rudisa Holding NV
- Chairman: Ryan Torilal
- Manager: Raymond Mannen
- League: Suriname Major League
- 2024: SML, Regular season: 2nd Playoffs: Runners-up
Home colours	Away colours	Third colours

Sport Vereniging Transvaal is a Surinamese professional association football club which plays in the domestic top level competition Suriname Major League. They play their home games in Paramaribo at André Kamperveen Stadion to a capacity of 7,100.

The team is one of Suriname's most successful, having won their first league championship in 1925, and having won a total of 19, good for second most in Suriname after Robinhood. Transvaal have also won the Beker van Suriname (Surinamese Cup) three times and the Suriname President's Cup twice (1997 and 2008). The biggest international successes were in 1973 and 1981, both resulting in CONCACAF Champions Cup victories. To date, they are the only Surinamese club to win the Champions Cup.

Since the launch of professional football on February 22, 2024, S.V. Transvaal is competing in the professional Suriname Major League.

== History ==
=== Early years ===
Former club crest

Founded on 15 January 1921 by Hendrik School students, a middle school in Paramaribo, Suriname, S.V. Transvaal is named after the former province of South Africa, Transvaal Province. It was founded in the same year as two other clubs from Paramaribo, namely Olympia and Ajax. The first three years prior to the foundation of organized football in Suriname, Transvaal played on the Gouvernementsplein in Paramaribo amongst various other clubs, competing in leagues of different associations. 1923 marked the official start of organized football in Suriname, with Transvaal starting in the Tweede Klasse (present day Eerste Klasse), the second flight of football in Suriname. 1923 also marked the inauguration of the Cultuurtuinlaan, the new football facility, built by Dr. E. Snellen, the director of agriculture in Suriname. Transvaal participated in the inaugural ceremony, where they beat Juliana in a 2–0 win. Transvaal remained tenants of the Cultuurtuinlaan for the next 30 years until completion of the National Stadium.

In 1924, Transvaal won their first title, winning the Tweede Klasse undefeated in its maiden season. The club were able to win all six matches played, earning 12 points in the competition, and scoring 16 goals while conceding none. It was the first time a team had gone undefeated or played a season without conceding any goals. Transvaal were subsequently promoted to the SVB Hoofdklasse, the top flight of football in Suriname, after only one season in the second tier.

In 1925, SV Transvaal won their second consecutive title and first national championship, winning the Hoofdklasse in its third season. After a period of dominance by Ajax and Cicerone, Transvaal won the title once more in 1937. That same year the SVB organized their first trip to Brazil, with Transvaal player Waldy Goedhart joining the national team to play exhibition matches against Tuna Luso, Paysandu and Remo.

On 28 March 1947 matches were played at night in Suriname for the first time, with light fixtures assembled at the Cultuurtuinlaan, the matches played on that night were NAKS vs. Robinhood at 19:00 and Transvaal vs. Paramaribo at 20:00. Key players of the forties and fifties include Tjokrosendjojo Kamsoe, Ronald Breinburg and Walther Braithwaite, who would later become manager of the club.

=== Rise to dominance ===
The 1960s marked a decade of success for Transvaal, winning 7 out of 10 titles beginning in 1962, only conceding the 1961 and 1963 titles to Leo Victor and the 1964 edition to Robinhood. The team was managed by André Kamperveen, one of the country's most famous players and Transvaal's most famous managers, who had taken over the position in 1958. In 1967 he was succeeded by Ronald Kolf who helped Transvaal to two national titles before relinquishing the position to Jules Lagadeau. Both Kolf and Lagadeau earned their stripes as players on the pitch prior to taking their respective managerial roles. Transvaal boasted some of the country's best players at the time, with players such as Edwin Schal, Iwan Fränkel, Harald Reumel, Roy Vanenburg and Armand Sahadewsing.

==== Matches against Brazilian clubs (1960–1967) ====
Throughout the 1960s the SVB organized friendly tournaments and exhibition matches with the Suriname national team and invited clubs from Brazil to partake. Aside from the national team, clubs from the Hoofdklasse were invited to participate as well, including Transvaal, Robinhood and Leo Victor.

In 1962 Transvaal participated in the first edition of the Paramaribo Cup. They played Fortaleza, losing 2–1 to the visiting team from Brazil. On 10 April 1962 they played Santa Cruz from Brazil, losing 2–1 as well. The 1964 edition of the Paramaribo Cup saw Transvaal losing to visitors Botafogo from Brazil in a 4–1 loss. Apart from a 4–0 win against Olaria, Transvaal were unable to secure any wins in the series.

===== Match results =====
2 February 1962	Transvaal (Suriname (Kingdom of the Netherlands))	1–2	(Brazil) Fortaleza	National Stadion, Paramaribo
	Kamsoe	Report

10 April 1962	Transvaal (Suriname (Kingdom of the Netherlands))	1–2	(Brazil) Santa Cruz	National Stadion, Paramaribo
	Breinburg	Report

27 February 1963	Transvaal (Suriname (Kingdom of the Netherlands))	2–3	(Brazil) Fortaleza	National Stadion, Paramaribo
	Breinburg	Report

7 April 1964	Transvaal (Suriname (Kingdom of the Netherlands))	4–0	(Brazil) Olaria	National Stadion, Paramaribo
	Bramerloo; Grootfaam; Monsanto; Schal	Report

17 June 1964	Transvaal (Suriname (Kingdom of the Netherlands))	1–4	(Brazil) Botafogo	National Stadion, Paramaribo
	Lagadeau	Report

23 January 1966	Transvaal (Suriname (Kingdom of the Netherlands))	1–1	(Brazil) Náutico	National Stadion, Paramaribo
	Lagadeau	Report

8 February 1966	Transvaal (Suriname (Kingdom of the Netherlands))	1–1	(Brazil) Paulista	National Stadion, Paramaribo
	Schal	Report

17 May 1966	Transvaal (Suriname (Kingdom of the Netherlands))	2–2	(Brazil) Fluminense	National Stadion, Paramaribo
	Lagadeau; Sahadewsingh	Report

19 May 1966	Transvaal (Suriname (Kingdom of the Netherlands))	2–3	(Brazil) Fluminense	National Stadion, Paramaribo
	Schal; Satimin	Report

14 February 1967	Transvaal (Suriname (Kingdom of the Netherlands))	1–3	(Brazil) Tuna Luso	National Stadion, Paramaribo
	Oehlers	Report

=== 1968: First trip to Europe ===
In 1968, Transvaal travelled to Europe for the first time, scheduling games in the Netherlands and Belgium, against Dutch Eredivisie clubs Sparta, Ajax, Elinkwijk, AZ'67 and NAC, and against Belgian Pro League side Royal Antwerp. Transvaal were able to secure 4 wins, and 1 draw only losing to Ajax on their tour.

==== Tour results ====
1 August 1968	Ajax (Netherlands)	4–1	(Suriname (Kingdom of the Netherlands)) Transvaal	De Meer Stadion, Amsterdam
		Report

2 August 1968	Sparta (Netherlands)	1–2	(Suriname (Kingdom of the Netherlands)) Transvaal	Het Kasteel, Rotterdam
		Report

4 August 1968	Royal Antwerp (Belgium)	2–2	(Suriname (Kingdom of the Netherlands)) Transvaal	Bosuilstadion, Antwerp
		Report

6 August 1968	NAC (Netherlands)	1–3	(Suriname (Kingdom of the Netherlands)) Transvaal	NAC Stadion, Breda
		Report

9 August 1968	Elinkwijk (Netherlands)	1–2	(Suriname (Kingdom of the Netherlands)) Transvaal	Sportpark Elinkwijk, Utrecht
		Report

11 August 1968	AZ'67 (Netherlands)	1–3	(Suriname (Kingdom of the Netherlands)) Transvaal	Alkmaarderhout, Alkmaar
		Report

=== 1968 CONCACAF Champions' Cup ===
In 1968, Transvaal participated in their first Continental tournament, qualifying for the 1968 CONCACAF Champions' Cup. The team were able to make it to the final in their first berth in the competition, defeating Scherpenheuvel from the Netherlands Antilles 4–2 on aggregate score and Aurora from Guatemala 3–1 on aggregate score in the process thus qualifying for the finals. The final against Toluca from Mexico however never happened due to a brawl that had ensued after the final match against Aurora when supporters from both clubs had invaded the pitch. Transvaal were disqualified for disorderly conduct.

In 1969, Flamengo from Rio de Janeiro, Brazil came to Paramaribo to play pre-season friendly matches against Robinhood and Transvaal at the National Stadium. Brazilian International Garrincha was playing for Flamengo at the time. While Robinhood lost the first match 3–1 to the visitors, Transvaal were able to secure a 3–2 win against the visiting team.

28 January 1969	Transvaal (Suriname (Kingdom of the Netherlands))	3–2	(Brazil) Flamengo	National Stadion, Paramaribo
		Report

=== 1971: Pelé's 1000th match ===
On 27 January 1971, O Rei himself Pelé and Santos F.C. from Santos, São Paulo came to Suriname to play Transvaal at the National Stadion. The match on 28 January 1971 was of historic significance as it was the 1000th career match played by Pelé. The Transvaal line-up included Emile Barron, Nortan, Gesser, Sordam, Boschman, Lagadeau, Bundel, Vanenburg, Schal, Brammerloo and Klimsop, while Santos line-up for the match included Cejos. Lima, Ramon Delgodo, Olando, Hildo Leo, Mene, Arken, Pi Colé, Pelé and Edu. Santos won the match 4–1 against Transvaal.

28 January 1971	Transvaal (Suriname (Kingdom of the Netherlands))	1–4	(Brazil) Santos	National Stadion, Paramaribo
		Report

In 1972, Edwin 'Wiene' Schal became the first Transvaal player to be called up for the CONCACAF All-Star team, considered to be one of the top players in the confederation at the time.

=== 1973 Season: Highest accolades ===
Showing steady improvement by each season, the 1973 season proved to be Transvaal's most successful to date. Under guidance of Jules Lagadeau, Transvaal went on to win the national title undefeated also winning the country's first ever CONCACAF Champions' Cup following the withdrawal of both Costa Rican clubs Alajuelense and Saprissa.

Accolades of the 1973 season include:

- Undefeated champions of the SVB Hoofdklasse.
- Undefeated champions in the SVB Junior League (youth team).
- Undefeated champions in the Sterrentoernooi (English, Stars Tournament).
- Undefeated champions of the Caribbean region (CFU).
- Undefeated winners of the CONCACAF Champions' Cup.
- Edwin 'Wiene' Schal finished as top scorer of the Hoofdklasse with 20 goals.
- Dennis van la Parra finished as top scorer of the Junior League.
- Imro Pengel wins Surinamese Goalkeeper of the Year, having conceded the fewest goals.
- Ricardo Sylvester wins Surinamese Goalkeeper of the Year in the Junior League.
- Dutch footballer and Transvaal striker Theo Klein is voted Surinamese Footballer of the Year.
- Match of the Year: Robinhood vs. Transvaal ended in a 1–1 draw with Transvaal winning 4–2 on penalties

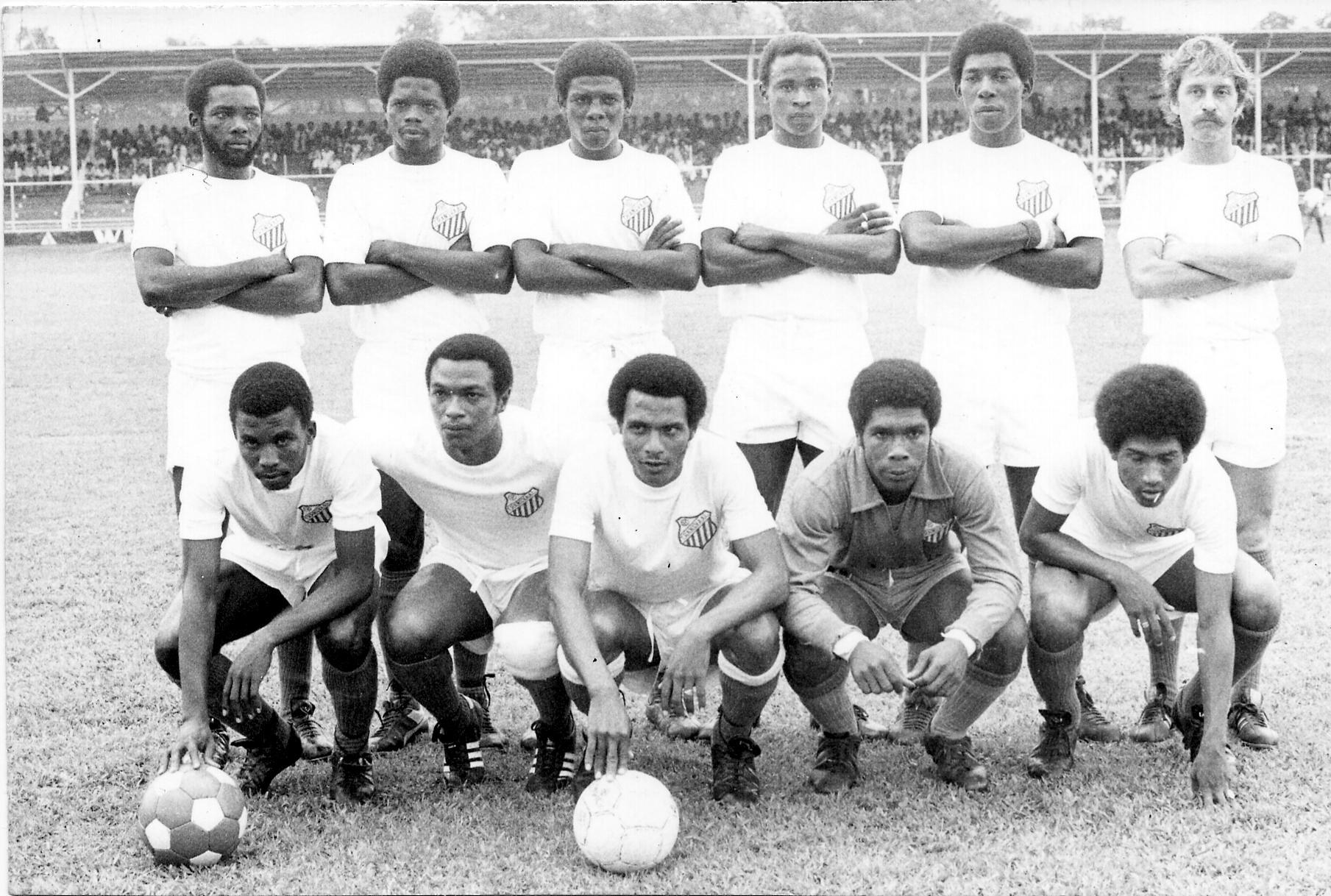
The team from the 1975 CONCACAF Champions' Cup, who reached second place, at the National Stadion in Paramaribo before the first leg of the final

The Transvaal first team players who contributed to the 1973 season were Wiene Schal (captain), Castillion, Theo Klein, Wensley Bundel, Gesser, Pauli Corte, Headly, Roy Vanenburg, Nortan, Del Prado, Lagadeau, Sordam, Monsanto, Grootfaam, Schenkers, Anches and Boschman. The manager of the club in 1973 was Jules Lagadeau. To this date no club in Suriname have been able to match the success of Transvaal in the 1973 season.

=== 1981 Season: The Golden Age ===
By 1981, Transvaal had become one of the most successful sides in Surinamese football. They had amassed 14 league titles already and held the only CONCACAF Champions League win for a Surinamese side back in 1971. With this season they would add their most recent international triumph over none other than Atlético Marte of El Salvador.

The 1981 CONCACAF Champions' Cup final took place in the city of Paramaribo, the capital of Suriname. According to former players, the onset of civil war in El Salvador was the reason CONCACAF decided to hold both games in the Andre Kamperveen Stadion in Suriname.

The first game was played with great difficulty. "The lawn was ugly [for lack of rain] and affected both teams," says Wensley Bundel, a midfielder who played in both games.

"Atlético Marte wanted to play short passes, but could not, so we took advantage of them," he said.

Wensley Bundel scored for Transvaal in the first game, which ended in 1–1 draw. Regarding the shot, he said, "It was a free kick. I remember that was barely hit the mark, but I gave it my all and I think [the] goalie is still looking for where the ball went."

For the second game, Johan Leisberger scored the winner. Transvaal played quick and fast and it paid off with raising the trophy under guidance of coach Humbert Boerleider. Thanks to an excellent performance, striker Theo Klein was hailed as the man of the match and was awarded player of the year in Suriname as well. Wensley Bundel to have won both CONCACAF titles with Transvaal.

There is a rumor amongst supporters of the club, that Transvaal actually defeated Cruz Azul from Mexico in the 1970 edition of the cup. This is not a known fact, but should this be the case then Bundel was the only player to have played in all three cup matches.

1981 Concacaf Champions Final Starting Lineup

The Transvaal Lineup 1981:

- (Suriname) Emile Barron (GK)
- (Suriname) Jules Lagadeau (DF)
- (Suriname) Edwin Schal (DF)
- (Suriname) Remie Olmberg (DF)
- (Suriname) Harald Brammerloo (DF)
- (Suriname) Wensley Bundel (MF)
- (Suriname) Johan Leisberger (MF)
- (Suriname) Roy Vanenburg (MF)
- (Suriname) Wong Sai Sang (MF)
- (Suriname) Pauli Corte (FW)
- (Netherlands) Theo Klein (FW)
- (Suriname) Humbert Boerleider Coach

=== 1986 CONCACAF Champions' Cup ===
In 1986, Transvaal made it to the finals of the Continental tournament for the fourth time. By defeating SV Juventus (Netherlands Antilles), UNDEBA (Netherlands Antilles) and rivals Robinhood (Suriname), thus clinching the Caribbean region, Transvaal then defeated Trintoc (Trinidad and Tobago) in the semi-final to face Alajuelense (Costa Rica) in the final. Losing the series 4–2 on aggregate score, it would be the fourth time the two clubs would be drawn together in the history of the tournament.

=== 1990–2000s and the end of an era ===
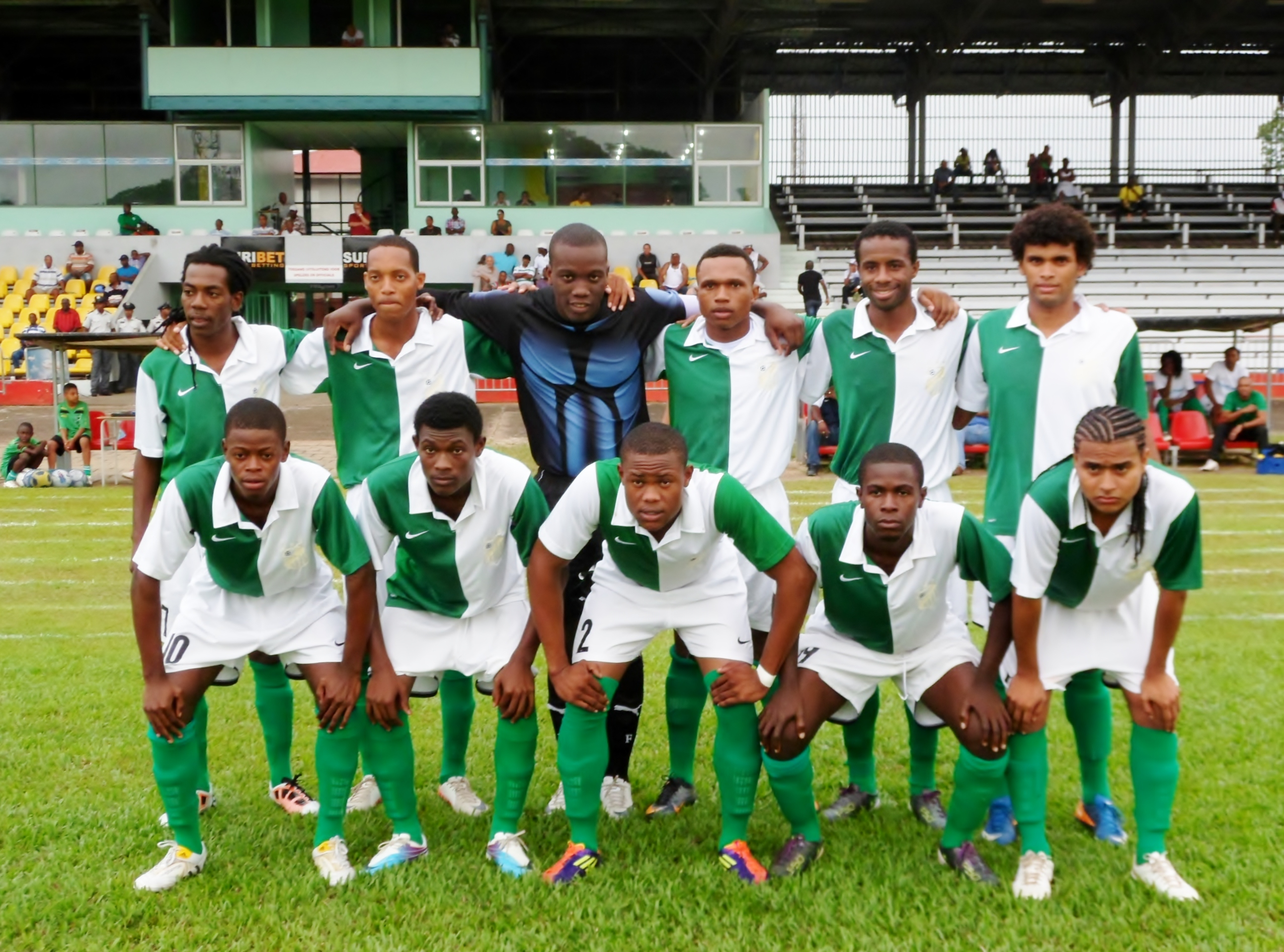
SV Transvaal team that played rivals SV Robinhood in the André Kamperveen Stadion, March 2012

Although Transvaal were unable to proceed past the rounds of the Caribbean region in the CONCACAF Champions' Cup during the nineties, the club did win five national titles in the decade, winning the Hoofdklasse in 1990, 1991, 1996, 1997 and 2000. The closest Transvaal came to advancing in the Continental tournament was a 10–0 aggregate defeat against the Seattle Sounders in the USA/Caribbean playoff round introduced to the tournament that year. The loss against the team from Seattle marked the end of Transvaal's firm presence within the tournament, having suffered an unprecedented loss.

A year later a new format to the tournament was introduced as well as the CFU Club Championship. Transvaal failed to advance past the first group stage of the tournament. They qualified for the 2001 edition but were forced to withdraw due to complications in their domestic league which saw no matches contested that year.

=== New ownership, new coaches 2015-present ===
After witnessing how Transvaal almost got relegated to the Eerste Klasse in the 2014–15 season, many wondered if Transie would rise to dominance again.

On 22 December 2015, Rudisa bought the club and in 2016 appointed Dennis Baino as head coach. The new owner and manager brought some changes to the club, such as training players four times a week. At the end of the 2016 season, Transie ended in second and punched a ticket to the CFU Club Championship, for the first time in 20 years.

On 29 January 2017, the board of Transvaal decided to replace Baino, after eight games played in the new Topklasse league, because he failed to keep the club in mid table. Two days later the board appointed Baino's assistant, Raymond Mannen as the new head coach. The next day Transie played against SNL under the new manager and won the match with two goals to one.

In September 2019 Transvaal signed a 3-year contract with trainer Kenneth Jaliens. Jaliens is considered to be the most educated trainer from Suriname and his objective is to bring back the glory from the old days that this club has seen.

== Stadium ==
Transvaal play their home matches at the André Kamperveen Stadion (formerly known as the National Stadion) in Paramaribo to a capacity of 7,100 people. They share the stadium with the Suriname national team. Transvaal have been tenants of the AK Stadium since construction was completed in 1953. Prior to the National Stadium, Transvaal played their home games on the Cultuurtuinlaan, across the street from where the stadium sits today. From 1953 to 2014, Transvaal shared the stadium with rivals S.V. Robinhood, before they suffered relegation in 2014, moving to the Frank Essed Stadion, together with S.V. Walking Boyz Company who had played at the Kamperveen stadium since 1997.

=== Youth stadium ===
Due to the high volume of activity at the clubs' home stadium, a result of the stadium being shared with the Surinamese athletics and cycling associations, a new stadium was erected in 1966 to serve as the training grounds for the youth teams of various clubs around Paramaribo. Transvaal were amongst the first tenants of the George W. Streepy Stadion, which serves as additional training facilities, as well as being the official stadium for the SVB Junior League, the youth league of the Surinamese Football Association.

== Crest and colors ==
The club colors are green and white and the team is named after the former province of South Africa, Transvaal Province. The badge white and green stripes with 'S.V. Transvaal' written across the shield from the bottom left to the top right. There is also a football in the top left corner of the badge. The club's playing kits are always a combination of green and white. Having had varying patterns over the years, including shirt stripes and patches, the typical outfit warn is white for home and green for away colors, which are two of the national colors of Suriname.

== Managerial history ==
- (Suriname (Kingdom of the Netherlands)) André Kamperveen (1958–64)
- (Suriname (Kingdom of the Netherlands)) Ronald Kolf (1967–68)
- (Suriname (Kingdom of the Netherlands)) Jules Lagadeau (1968–75)
- (Suriname) Humbert Boerleider (1975–81)
- (Suriname) Ricardo Landveld (2008–10)
- (Suriname) Wensley Bundel (2010–14)
- (Suriname) Jimmy Letnom (2014)
- (Suriname) Roy Vanenburg (2014–16)
- (Suriname) Dennis Baino (2016–2017)
- (Netherlands) Raymond Mannen (2017–2019)
- (Suriname) Kenneth Jaliens (2019–2022)
- (Suriname) Ashween Achaibersing (2022–2023)
- (Netherlands) Raymond Mannen (2023–)

== Honours ==
=== Official trophies (recognized by CONCACAF and FIFA) ===
==== National ====
- Hoofdklasse
  - Champions (19):1925, 1937, 1938, 1950, 1951, 1962, 1965, 1966, 1967, 1968, 1969, 1970, 1973, 1974, 1990, 1991, 1996, 1997, 2000
- Tweede Klasse
  - Champions (1):1924
- Beker van Suriname
  - Winners (3):1996, 2002, 2008
- Suriname President's Cup
  - Winners (2):1997, 2008

==== International ====
- CONCACAF Champions Cup
  - Winners (2):1973, 1981
  - Runners-up (3): 1974, 1975, 1986

==== Other ====
- Royal Cup
  - Winners (1):2009

== Performance in CONCACAF competitions ==
=== CONCACAF Champions' Cup ===
CONCACAF Champions' Cup: 14 appearances

Titles (2):1973, 1981

- 1968 CONCACAF Champions' Cup

First Round (Caribbean) v. (Netherlands Antilles) Scherpenheuvel – 1:1, 3:1
Semi-final v. (Guatemala) Aurora – 1:1, 2:0
Final (2nd place) v. (Mexico) Toluca – Disqualified

- 1970 CONCACAF Champions' Cup

First Round (Caribbean) v. (Trinidad and Tobago) Maple Club – 2:0, 2:1
Second Round (Caribbean) v. (Jamaica) Santos – 2:0, 3:1
Third Round (Caribbean) v. (Haiti) Racing CH – Unknown
Semi-final v. (Mexico) Cruz Azul – Withdrew

- 1971 CONCACAF Champions' Cup

First Round (Caribbean) v. (Guyana) Thomas United – 3:1, 3:0
Final Tournament v. (United States) Rochester Lancers – 0:2
Final Tournament v. (Mexico) Cruz Azul – 1:1
Final Tournament v. (Guatemala) Comunicaciones – 1:3
Final Tournament v. (Costa Rica) Alajuelense – 0:2
Final Tournament v. (Netherlands Antilles) Estrella – 1:0

- 1973 CONCACAF Champions' Cup

First Round (Caribbean) v. (Dominican Republic) Universidad Catolica – 8:0, 6:0
Second Round (Caribbean) v. (Netherlands Antilles) SUBT – 5:2, 4:1
Third Round (Caribbean) v. (Netherlands Antilles) Jong Colombia – 2:1, 2:1
Final Round v. (Costa Rica) Alajuelense – Alajuelense Withdrew
Final Round (1st place) v. (Costa Rica) Saprissa – Saprissa Withdrew

- 1974 CONCACAF Champions' Cup

First Round (Caribbean) v. (Netherlands Antilles) Real Rincon – 6:1, 6:0
Second Round (Caribbean) v. (Netherlands Antilles) Jong Colombia – 2:1, 3:2
Final (2nd place) v. (Guatemala) Municipal – 1:2, 1:2

- 1975 CONCACAF Champions' Cup

First Round (Caribbean) v. (Haiti) Violette – Violette Withdrew
Second Round (Caribbean) v. (Jamaica) Santos – 4:1, 1:0
Final (2nd place) v. (Mexico) Atlético Español – 0:3, 1:2

- 1978 CONCACAF Champions' Cup

First Round (Caribbean) v. (Netherlands Antilles) Jong Holland – 0:0, 4:2
Second Round (Caribbean) v. (Trinidad and Tobago) Defence Force – 1:1, 1:3

- 1980 CONCACAF Champions' Cup

First Round (Caribbean) v. (Trinidad and Tobago) Police – 3:1, 1:1
Second Round (Caribbean) v. (Netherlands Antilles) Jong Colombia – 1:0, 4:0
Third Round (Caribbean) v. (Suriname) Robinhood – Unknown

- 1981 CONCACAF Champions' Cup

First Round (Caribbean) v. (Trinidad and Tobago) Defence Force – Unknown
Second Round (Caribbean) v. (Suriname) Robinhood – Unknown
Third Round (Caribbean) v. (Netherlands Antilles) SUBT – 1:0, 2:0
Final (1st place) v. (El Salvador) Atlético Marte – 1:0, 1:1

- 1986 CONCACAF Champions' Cup

First Round (Caribbean) v. (Netherlands Antilles) Juventus – 5:0, 4:0
Second Round (Caribbean) v. (Netherlands Antilles) UNDEBA – 5:1, 1:2
Third Round (Caribbean) v. (Suriname) Robinhood – 2:2, 1:0
Semi-final v. (Trinidad and Tobago) Trintoc – 4:2, 0:2 (4:3 pen.)
Final (2nd place) v. (Costa Rica) Alajuelense – 1:2, 1:2

- 1990 CONCACAF Champions' Cup

First Round (Caribbean) v. (Suriname) Robinhood – 0:0, 2:1
Second Round (Caribbean) v. (Barbados) Paradise – 2:0, 0:3

- 1991 CONCACAF Champions' Cup

First Round (Caribbean) v. (Netherlands Antilles) SUBT – 3:0, 3:0
Second Round (Caribbean) v. (Trinidad and Tobago) Police – 0:2, 0:2

- 1992 CONCACAF Champions' Cup

First Round (Caribbean) v. (Trinidad and Tobago) Trintoc – 2:0, 0:1
Second Round (Caribbean) v. (Netherlands Antilles) Sithoc – 1:2, 1:0 (2:3 pen.)

- 1996 CONCACAF Champions' Cup

First Round (Caribbean) v. (Guadeloupe) Red Star – Red Star Withdrew
Second Round (Caribbean) v. (Suriname) Prakash – 0:0, 1:0
USA/Caribbean playoff v. (United States) Seattle Sounders – 0:10

=== CFU Club Championship ===
CFU Club Championship: 2 appearances

Titles:None

- 1997 CFU Club Championship

Group Stage v. (Saint Vincent and the Grenadines) Stubborn Youth – 1:0
Group Stage v. (Martinique) Club Franciscain – 0:1
Group Stage v. (Jamaica) Seba United – 0:2

- 2017 CFU Club Championship

Group Stage v. Puerto Rico FC 0:1
Group Stage v. (Cayman Islands) Scholars International 4:0
Group Stage v. (Jamaica) Portmore United 1:6

=== Caribbean Club Shield ===
- 2025 CFU Club Shield

Group Stage v. (British Virgin Islands) Wolues – 3:0
Group Stage v. (Antigua and Barbuda) All Saints United – 0:0

== Team records ==
- First team to win the Tweede Klasse championship undefeated in 1924.
- First team to concede no goals in a Tweede Klasse season in 1924, keeping a clean sheet in every match.
- Transvaal were the opponent of Santos FC from Brazil in Pelé's 1000th match played on 28 January 1971.
- First team to win the Hoofdklasse national championship undefeated in 1973.
- First team from Suriname to win the CONCACAF Champions' Cup in 1973.
