= 1968 CONCACAF Champions' Cup =

4th edition of premier club football tournament organized by CONCACAF

Tournament details
- Dates: 26 May – 1 December 1968
- Teams: 10

Final positions
- Champions: (Mexico) Toluca (1st title)

The 1968 CONCACAF Champions' Cup was the 4th edition of the annual international club football competition held in the CONCACAF region (North America, Central America and the Caribbean), the CONCACAF Champions' Cup. It determined that year's football club champion in the CONCACAF region.

The tournament was played by 10 teams of 10 nations: Netherlands Antilles, Bermuda, El Salvador, United States, Guatemala, Mexico, Honduras, Suriname, Nicaragua, Costa Rica.

It was played from 26 May till 1 December 1968 under the home/away match system. The tournament was split in 3 zones (North American, Central American and Caribbean), each one qualifying the winner to the final tournament, where the winners of the Central and Caribbean zones played a semi-final to decide who was going to play against the Northern champion in the final. The final was scratched and Toluca were declared champions after both semi-finalists, Aurora and Transvaal, were ejected from the competition (Aurora due to crowd violence and Transvaal for using ineligible players).

Toluca FC from Mexico thus became for the first time in its history CONCACAF champion.

== Caribbean zone ==
22 April 1968 1st leg	Scherpenheuvel (Netherlands Antilles)	1–1	(Suriname (Kingdom of the Netherlands)) Transvaal
	TBD		TBD

2 May 1968 2nd leg	Transvaal (Suriname (Kingdom of the Netherlands))	3–1	(Netherlands Antilles) Scherpenheuvel
	TBD; TBD; TBD		TBD

- Transvaal won 4–2 on aggregate score.

== Northern zone ==
=== First round ===
26 May 1968 1st leg	Somerset Trojans (Bermuda)	2–1	(United States) NY Greek American
	TBD; TBD		TBD

2 June 1968 2nd leg	NY Greek American (United States)	1–0	(Bermuda) Somerset Trojans
	TBD		Nil

Play-off	NY Greek American (United States)	2–1	(Bermuda) Somerset Trojans	New York, New York
	TBD; TBD		TBD

- NY Greek American won 4–3 on aggregate score.

=== Second round ===
29 September 1968 1st leg	Toluca (Mexico)	4–1	(United States) NY Greek American	Mexico
CST	Amaury Epaminondas 14' 85' (pen.); Felipe Ruvalcaba 25'; Francisco Linares 59'		Tonorezos 33' (pen.)

6 October 1968 2nd leg	NY Greek American (United States)	2–3	(Mexico) Toluca	United States
EST	Víctor Jurisenvik; John Kosmidis		Felipe Ruvalcaba; Juan Dosal; Amaury Epaminondas

- Toluca won 7–3 on aggregate score.

== Central American Zone ==
=== First round ===
Torneo Centroamericano de Concacaf 1968

3 April 1968 1st leg	Alajuelense (Costa Rica)	0–2	(Guatemala) Aurora	San José, Costa Rica
CST			Oscar Molina; Jorge Roldán	Stadium: Estadio Nacional de Costa Rica

7 April 1968 2nd leg	Aurora (Guatemala)	0–1	(Costa Rica) Alajuelense	Guatemala City, Guatemala
CST			Goal	Stadium: Estadio Doroteo Guamuch Flores

- Aurora won 2–1 on aggregate score.

21 April 1968 1st leg	Alianza (El Salvador)	1–2	(Honduras) Olimpia	San Salvador, El Salvador
CST	Odir Jacques		Ricardo Taylor; Donaldo Rosales	Stadium: Estadio Flor Blanca

28 April 1968 2nd leg	Olimpia (Honduras)	1–0	(El Salvador) Alianza	Tegucigalpa, Honduras
CST	Conrado Flores			Stadium: Estadio Nacional Chelato Uclés

- Olimpia won 3–1 on aggregate score.

=== Second round ===
3 November 1968 1st leg	Olimpia (Honduras)	1–1	(Guatemala) Aurora	Tegucigalpa, Honduras
CST	TBD		TBD	Stadium: Estadio Nacional Chelato Uclés

10 November 1968 2nd leg	Aurora (Guatemala)	4–0	(Honduras) Olimpia	Guatemala City, Guatemala
CST	TBD; TBD; TBD; TBD			Stadium: Estadio Doroteo Guamuch Flores

- Aurora won 5–1 on aggregate score.

== Semi-final ==
27 November 1968 1st leg	Transvaal (Suriname (Kingdom of the Netherlands))	1–1	(Guatemala) Aurora	Paramaribo, Dutch Guiana
AST	Iwan Wong Swie San		TBD

1 December 1968 2nd leg	Aurora (Guatemala)	0–2	(Suriname (Kingdom of the Netherlands)) Transvaal	Paramaribo, Dutch Guiana
AST	Nil		TBD; TBD

The semi-final was declared null and void, and both teams were ejected from the competition: Aurora after their fans invaded the pitch following the end of the 2nd leg and caused a mass brawl between celebrating Transvaal fans, and Transvaal for using three ineligible players in both legs.

== Final ==
After Aurora and Transvaal were both ejected from the competition, the final was scratched and Toluca were declared champions.

== Champion ==
CONCACAF Champions' Cup
1968 champion

1st title
