= 1973 CONCACAF Champions' Cup =

9th edition of premier club football tournament organized by CONCACAF

Tournament details
- Dates: 1 June 1973 – 10 January 1974
- Teams: 16 (from 9 associations)

Final positions
- Champions: (Suriname (Kingdom of the Netherlands)) Transvaal (1st title)
- Runners-up: (Costa Rica) Saprissa

The 1973 CONCACAF Champions' Cup was the 9th edition of the top international club competition organized by CONCACAF for clubs from North America, Central America and the Caribbean, the CONCACAF Champions' Cup. It determined the 1973 continental football champions in the CONCACAF region. The tournament was originally scheduled to be played by 16 teams of 9 national associations, from 1 June to 3 August 1973 with the matches in the tournament played under the home/away match, but a final series was set up for 8 and 10 January 1974, after no team from either of the other two sections participated.

The teams were split into three zones (North American, Central American and Caribbean), each one qualifying the winner to participate in the final tournament. As no clubs entered in the North American section, the winner of the two remaining zones gained the qualification to the final, but both Central American teams withdrew; therefore the final was scratched and the Caribbean winner, Transvaal from Suriname, won the tournament, becoming CONCACAF champion for the first time.

== North American Zone ==
The zone was cancelled as no clubs entered.

== Central American Zone ==
=== First round ===
Torneo Centroamericano de Concacaf 1973

Team 1	Agg.	Team 2	1st leg	2nd leg
Vida (Honduras)	0–3	(Costa Rica) Saprissa	0–2	0–1
Municipal (Guatemala)	1–0^{1}	(Honduras) Olimpia	0–0	1–0
Alajuelense (Costa Rica)	4–0	(El Salvador) Águila	3–0	1–0^{2}
Comunicaciones (Guatemala)	1–0	(El Salvador) Juventud Olímpica	0–0	1–0

Saprissa, Alajuelense and Comunicaciones advanced to the Central American Zone second round.
^{1} CSD Municipal later withdrew.
^{2} The match was abandoned in the 68th minute with Alajuelense leading 1–0 due to torrential rain which flooded the pitch; the result was allowed to stand.

1 June 1973	Vida (Honduras)	0–2	(Costa Rica) Saprissa	San Pedro Sula
			Carlos Solano; Gerardo Solano	Stadium: Estadio Francisco Morazán

24 June 1973	Saprissa (Costa Rica)	1–0 (3–0 agg.)	(Honduras) Vida	San Juan de Tibás
	Gerardo Solano			Stadium: Estadio Ricardo Saprissa Aymá

(Costa Rica) Saprissa advanced to the Second Round

18 July 1973	Municipal (Guatemala)	0–0	(Honduras) Olimpia	Guatemala City
				Stadium: Estadio Doroteo Guamuch Flores

25 July 1973	Olimpia (Honduras)	0–1 (0–1 agg.)	(Guatemala) Municipal	Tegucigalpa
			Leonardo McNish	Stadium: Estadio Nacional Chelato Uclés

(Guatemala) Municipal advanced to the Second Round

24 June 1973	Alajuelense (Costa Rica)	3–0	(El Salvador) Águila	Alajuela
	Roy Saénz; Walter Elizondo			Stadium: Estadio Alejandro Morera Soto

29 June 1973	Águila (El Salvador)	0–1 (0–4 agg.)	(Costa Rica) Alajuelense	San Salvador
			Walter Elizondo	Stadium: Estadio Jorge "Mágico" González

(Costa Rica) Alajuelense advanced to the Second Round

11 June 1973	Comunicaciones (Guatemala)	0–0	(El Salvador) Juventud Olímpica	Guatemala City
				Stadium: Estadio Doroteo Guamuch Flores

3 August 1973	Juventud Olímpica (El Salvador)	0–1 (0–1 agg.)	(Guatemala) Comunicaciones	San Salvador
			Erwin Torres	Stadium: Estadio Jorge "Mágico" González

(Guatemala) Comunicaciones advance to the Second Round

=== Second round ===
Team 1	Agg.	Team 2	1st leg	2nd leg
Deportivo Santa Cecilia^{1} (Nicaragua)	1–8	(Costa Rica) Alajuelense	0–5	1–3
Comunicaciones (Guatemala)	1–4	(Costa Rica) Saprissa	1–0	0–4

^{1}Deportivo Santa Cecilia replaced Municipal, who withdrew.

3 August 1973	Alajuelense (Costa Rica)	5–0	(Nicaragua) Deportivo Santa Cecilia	Alajuela, Costa Rica
	Richard González; Alfredo Piedra; Roy Sáenz; Javier Jimenez			Stadium: Estadio Alejandro Morera Soto

10 September 1973	Deportivo Santa Cecilia (Nicaragua)	1–3 (1–8 agg.)	(Costa Rica) Alajuelense	Diriamba, Nicaragua
	Gerardo Barrios		Alfonso Obregón; Javier Jimenez	Stadium: Estadio La Salle

(Costa Rica) Alajuelense advanced to the Third Round

8 October 1973	Comunicaciones (Guatemala)	1–0	(Costa Rica) Saprissa	Guatemala City, Guatemala
	Félix McDonald			Stadium: Estadio Mateo Flores

15 October 1973	Saprissa (Costa Rica)	4–0 (4–1 agg.)	(Guatemala) Comunicaciones	San Juan de Tibás, Costa Rica
	Wilberth Barquero; Hernán Morales; Gerardo Solano; Carlos Solano			Stadium: Estadio Ricardo Saprissa Aymá; Attendance: 5,586

(Costa Rica) Saprissa advanced to the Third Round

=== Third round ===
Team 1	Agg.	Team 2	1st leg	2nd leg
Alajuelense (Costa Rica)	0–2	(Costa Rica) Saprissa	0–1	0–1

Saprissa won the series, but later withdrew.

21 November 1973	Saprissa (Costa Rica)	1–0	(Costa Rica) Alajuelense	San Juan de Tibás
	Goal			Stadium: Estadio Ricardo Saprissa Aymá

5 December 1973	Alajuelense (Costa Rica)	0–1 (0–2 agg.)	(Costa Rica) Saprissa	San José, Costa Rica
			Goal	Stadium: Estadio Nacional de Costa Rica

== Caribbean Zone ==
=== First round ===
Team 1	Agg.	Team 2	1st leg	2nd leg
Robinhood (Suriname (Kingdom of the Netherlands))	2–4	(Netherlands Antilles) Jong Colombia	2–3	0–1
Transvaal (Suriname (Kingdom of the Netherlands))	14–0	(Dominican Republic) Universidad Católica	8–0	6–0
Devonshire Colts (Bermuda)	6–5	(Bermuda) North Village CC	3–1	3–4

Bye: S.V. SUBT

29 June 1973	Robinhood (Suriname (Kingdom of the Netherlands))	2–3	(Netherlands Antilles) Jong Colombia
	Goal		Goal

15 July 1973	Jong Colombia (Netherlands Antilles)	1–0 (2–4 agg.)	(Suriname (Kingdom of the Netherlands)) Robinhood
	Nil		Goal

24 June 1973	Transvaal (Suriname (Kingdom of the Netherlands))	8–0	(Dominican Republic) Universidad Católica	Paramaribo’s National Stadion
	Edwin Schal; Theo Klein; Musanto; Corte; Nortan; Own goal		Nil

28 June 1973	Universidad Católica (Dominican Republic)	0–6 (0–14 agg.)	(Suriname (Kingdom of the Netherlands)) Transvaal	Paramaribo’s National Stadion
	Nil		Edwin Schal; Klein; Hedley; Del Prado

28 June 1973	Devonshire Colts (Bermuda)	3–1	(Bermuda) North Village CC	Bermuda National Stadium
	Goal		Goal

1 July 1973	North Village CC (Bermuda)	4–3 (5–6 agg.)	(Bermuda) Devonshire Colts	Bermuda National Stadium
	Goal		Goal

=== Second round ===
Team 1	Agg.	Team 2	1st leg	2nd leg
SUBT (Netherlands Antilles)	3–9	(Suriname (Kingdom of the Netherlands)) Transvaal	2–5	1–4
Jong Colombia (Netherlands Antilles)	w/o^{1}	(Bermuda) Devonshire Colts		

^{1} Devonshire Colts withdrew.

- Transvaal and Jong Colombia advance to the third round.

12 July 1973	SUBT (Netherlands Antilles)	2–5	(Suriname (Kingdom of the Netherlands)) Transvaal	Willemstad
	Goal		Wiene Schal; Humphrey Castillion; Theo Klein; Wesley Bundel

Transvaal (Suriname (Kingdom of the Netherlands))	4–1 (9–3 agg.)	(Netherlands Antilles) SUBT
Wiene Schal; Humphrey Castillion; Theo Klein; Vanenburg		Goal

=== Third round ===
Team 1	Agg.	Team 2	1st leg	2nd leg
Transvaal (Suriname (Kingdom of the Netherlands))	4–2	(Netherlands Antilles) Jong Colombia	2–1	2–1

Transvaal (Suriname (Kingdom of the Netherlands))	2–1	(Netherlands Antilles) Jong Colombia
TBD; TBD		TBD

4 August 1973	Jong Colombia (Netherlands Antilles)	1–2 (2–4 agg.)	(Suriname (Kingdom of the Netherlands)) Transvaal
	TBD		George Headley; Edwin Schal

=== Fourth round ===
Team 1	Agg.	Team 2	1st leg	2nd leg
Transvaal (Suriname (Kingdom of the Netherlands))	7–3	(Bermuda) Devonshire Colts	4–2	3–1

^{1} Devonshire Colts were reinstated as all other clubs from the Central Zone withdrew, since the Northern Zone had been cancelled due to no clubs having entered.

8 January 1974	Transvaal (Suriname (Kingdom of the Netherlands))	4–2	(Bermuda) Devonshire Colts
	Wiene Schal; Wensley Bundel; Theo Klein; Humphrey Castillion		Lambert; Darrel

10 January 1974	Transvaal (Suriname (Kingdom of the Netherlands))	3–1 (7–3 agg.)	(Bermuda) Devonshire Colts
	Theo Klein; Wiene Schal; Roy Vanenburg		Lambert

== Final round ==
The final round was scratched and Transvaal, the winners of the Caribbean Zone, were declared CONCACAF champions after the winners of the Central American Zone, Saprissa, withdrew on 15 December 1973.

Champions
(Suriname (Kingdom of the Netherlands))
Transvaal
1st title
