= CONCACAF Champions Cup =

North American association football tournament

- Organizer(s): CONCACAF
- Founded: 1962; 64 years ago
- Region: North America; Central America; Caribbean
- Teams: 27 (since 2024)
- Qualifier for: FIFA Club World Cup; FIFA Intercontinental Cup
- Current champion(s): (Mexico) Toluca (3rd title)
- Most championships: (Mexico) América (Mexico) Cruz Azul (7 titles each)
- Broadcaster: CONCACAF (YouTube)
- Website: CONCACAF Champions Cup
- 2026 CONCACAF Champions Cup

The CONCACAF Champions Cup, formerly known as the CONCACAF Champions League (2008–2023), is an international association football competition organized by CONCACAF as its top continental tournament for clubs from North America, Central America, and the Caribbean. The champions automatically qualify for the FIFA Club World Cup and the FIFA Intercontinental Cup.

The tournament currently uses a knockout format; it had a group stage prior to the 2018 edition. Unlike Europe's UEFA Champions League and South America's Copa Libertadores, the winner of the CONCACAF Champions Cup does not automatically qualify for the following edition of the tournament.

Thirty clubs have won the competition at least once, with 14 of them having won the title more than once. Mexican clubs have won the title 41 times, the most of any nation in the confederation. The second most successful nation is Costa Rica, with six titles in total, followed by clubs from the United States and El Salvador with three for each country. América and Cruz Azul are the most successful clubs in the competition, winning seven titles each. The most successful non-Mexican club is Saprissa of Costa Rica, which has won three titles. The only four teams to successfully defend the title are all Mexican: América, Cruz Azul, Pachuca and Monterrey.

The current champions of the competition are Toluca, who defeated Tigres UANL in the 2026 final.

== Competition format ==
Currently, each round of competition consists of a two-leg home-and-away series with the winners determined by aggregate goals over both legs. If aggregate goals are equal, the away goals rule is applied. If away goals are also equal, the game goes to an extra time period. If it is still tied, the game is decided through a penalty shoot-out.

Prior to 2018, the tournament had two parts: a group stage held from August to October, and a knockout phase held from March to May of the following year. The group stage consisted of 24 teams playing in eight groups of three teams each, with each team playing the other two teams in its group twice. American and Mexican sides could not be drawn into the same group. The winners of each of the eight groups advanced to the quarterfinals. Each phase of the knockout rounds (quarterfinals, semifinals, finals) consisted of a two-leg home-and-away series with the winner determined by aggregate goal differential. Seeding in the knockout phase was determined by performance during the group stage.

Prior to the 2012–13 season, the competition had involved four groups of four, with one Mexican team and one U.S. team in each group. A preliminary round was used to reduce the number of teams from 24 to 16.

== History ==
| Edition | Champions |
CONCACAF Champions' Cup
| 1962 | (Mexico) Guadalajara |
| 1963 | (Haiti) Racing CH |
| 1967 | (El Salvador) Alianza |
| 1968 | (Mexico) Toluca |
| 1969 | (Mexico) Cruz Azul |
| 1970 | (Mexico) Cruz Azul (2) |
| 1971 | (Mexico) Cruz Azul (3) |
| 1972 | (Honduras) Olimpia |
| 1973 | (Suriname (Kingdom of the Netherlands)) Transvaal |
| 1974 | (Guatemala) Municipal |
| 1975 | (Mexico) Atlético Español |
| 1976 | (El Salvador) Águila |
| 1977 | (Mexico) América |
| 1978 | (Mexico) UdeG (Guatemala) Comunicaciones (Trinidad and Tobago) Defence Force |
| 1979 | (El Salvador) FAS |
| 1980 | (Mexico) Pumas |
| 1981 | (Suriname) Transvaal (2) |
| 1982 | (Mexico) Pumas (2) |
| 1983 | (Mexico) Atlante |
| 1984 | (Haiti) Violette |
| 1985 | (Trinidad and Tobago) Defence Force (2) |
| 1986 | (Costa Rica) Alajuelense |
| 1987 | (Mexico) América (2) |
| 1988 | (Honduras) Olimpia (2) |
| 1989 | (Mexico) Pumas (3) |
| 1990 | (Mexico) America (3) |
| 1991 | (Mexico) Puebla |
| 1992 | (Mexico) América (4) |
| 1993 | (Costa Rica) Saprissa |
| 1994 | (Costa Rica) Cartaginés |
| 1995 | (Costa Rica) Saprissa (2) |
| 1996 | (Mexico) Cruz Azul (4) |
| 1997 | (Mexico) Cruz Azul (5) |
| 1998 | (United States) D.C. United |
| 1999 | (Mexico) Necaxa |
| 2000 | (United States) LA Galaxy |
| 2002 | (Mexico) Pachuca |
| 2003 | (Mexico) Toluca (2) |
| 2004 | (Costa Rica) Alajuelense (2) |
| 2005 | (Costa Rica) Saprissa (3) |
| 2006 | (Mexico) América (5) |
| 2007 | (Mexico) Pachuca (2) |
| 2008 | (Mexico) Pachuca (3) |
CONCACAF Champions League
| 2008–09 | (Mexico) Atlante (2) |
| 2009–10 | (Mexico) Pachuca (4) |
| 2010–11 | (Mexico) Monterrey |
| 2011–12 | (Mexico) Monterrey (2) |
| 2012–13 | (Mexico) Monterrey (3) |
| 2013–14 | (Mexico) Cruz Azul (6) |
| 2014–15 | (Mexico) América (6) |
| 2015–16 | (Mexico) América (7) |
| 2016–17 | (Mexico) Pachuca (5) |
| 2018 | (Mexico) Guadalajara (2) |
| 2019 | (Mexico) Monterrey (4) |
| 2020 | (Mexico) Tigres UANL |
| 2021 | (Mexico) Monterrey (5) |
| 2022 | (United States) Seattle Sounders FC |
| 2023 | (Mexico) León |
CONCACAF Champions Cup
| 2024 | (Mexico) Pachuca (6) |
| 2025 | (Mexico) Cruz Azul (7) |
| 2026 | (Mexico) Toluca (3) |

=== Champions' Cup era (1962–2008) ===
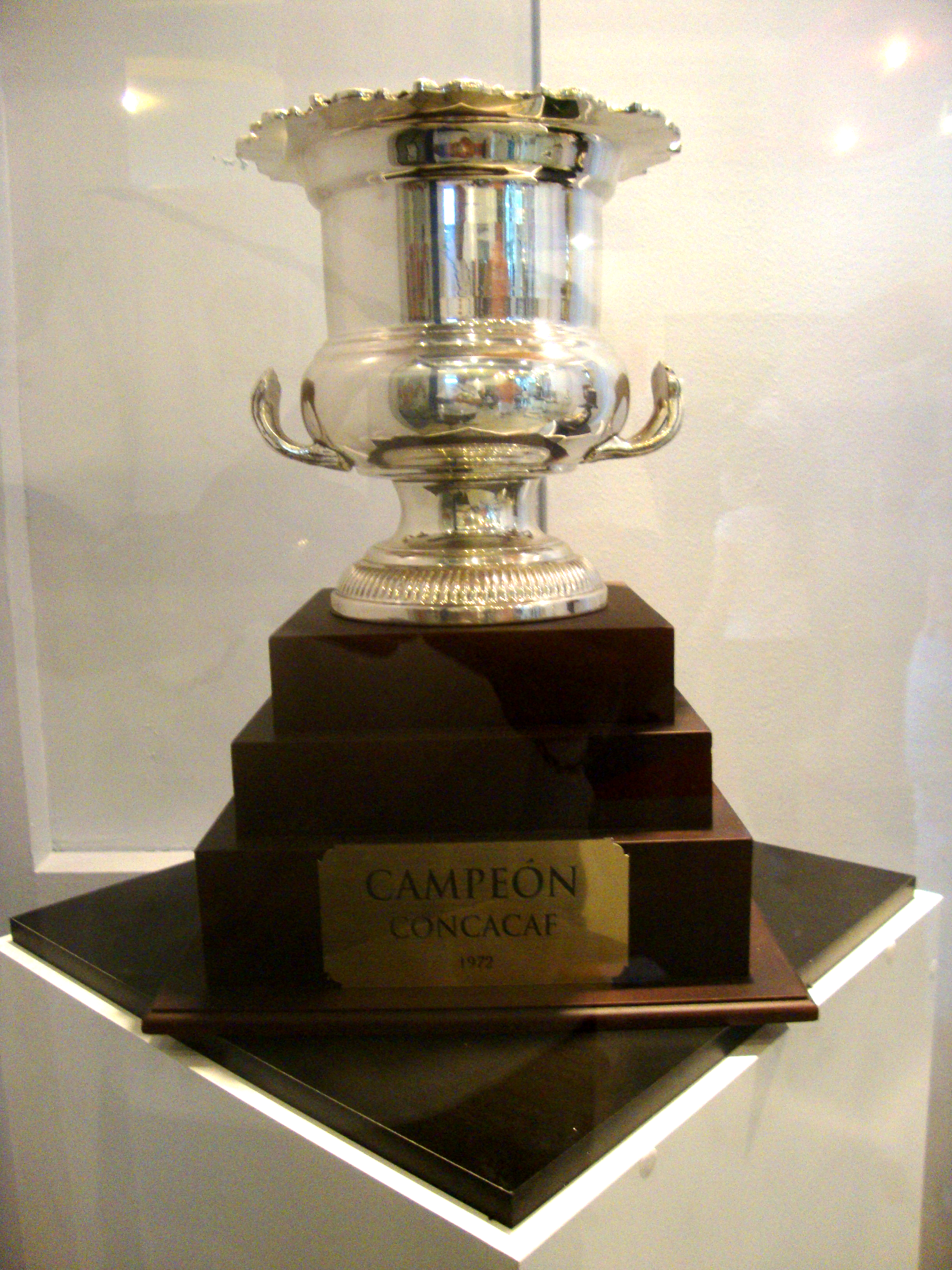
Champions' Cup trophy won by CD Olimpia in 1972

Prior to 2008, the tournament was called the CONCACAF Champions' Cup, but was usually referred to simply as the Champions' Cup. The competition began play in 1962.

The competition had several different formats over its lifetime. Initially, only the champions of the North American leagues participated. In 1971, the runners-up of a few North American leagues began to join and the tournament began to be expanded, incorporating round-robin group phases and more teams.

==== Initial formats (1962–1996) ====
During the opening rounds of the tournament, teams would compete within one of three regional zones: North America, Central America, and the Caribbean. Typically the winner of one zone would receive a bye to the Champions' Cup final while the winner of the other two zones would compete in a semifinal. From 1981, the North and Central American zones were usually combined meaning that the winner of the joint zone would face the winner of the Caribbean zone in the final. From 1993 to 1996, three clubs from the North/Central American zone and one club from the Caribbean zone qualified for the final round of the tournament which was held in a central location.

==== Knockout formats (1997–2008) ====
After the creation of the Major League Soccer, the competition became an eight-team knockout tournament with zonal qualification. The first four editions were hosted in a central location with single leg ties before changing to a home-and-away format in 2002. Four North American zone clubs qualified from Liga MX or Major League Soccer, three Central American clubs from the UNCAF Interclub Cup, and one Caribbean club from the CFU Club Championship. In 2002 and 2003, the tournament consisted of 16 teams with twice as many qualifying from each zone. Since 2005, the champion of the competition gained entry into the FIFA Club World Cup, giving clubs an added incentive for a strong participation and greater interest from fans.

=== Champions League era (2008–2023) ===
At their 2006 November meeting, the CONCACAF Executive Committee decided to "act upon" a proposal at their next meeting by the CONCACAF Secretariat to develop the CONCACAF Champions' Cup into a larger "Champions League" style event. On 14 November 2007, the CONCACAF Executive Committee reported some of the details.

==== Initial format: preliminary round and group stage (2008–2012) ====
The last eight-team Champions' Cup format was used as planned in March and April 2008. Then, a newly expanded 24-team Champions League tournament was conducted starting in August 2008 and concluding in May 2009. The expanded tournament meant that Central American clubs would qualify directly and thus the UNCAF Interclub Cup was ended after 2007.

In the new Champions League tournament, there was a two-legged preliminary round for 16 clubs, with the eight winners advancing to the group stage. They were joined by the other eight teams who qualified directly to the group stage. The clubs involved in the group stage were placed into four groups of four with each team playing the others in its group in both home and away matches. The top two teams from each group advanced to quarterfinals of the knockout rounds, which consisted of two-legged ties. The final round was also two-legged. Also, unlike the previously contested CONCACAF Champions' Cup, the away goals rule is used in the CONCACAF Champions League, but does not apply after a tie goes into extra time.

==== Elimination of the preliminary round (2012–2017) ====
On January 12, 2012, CONCACAF announced that the 2012–13 tournament would be played under a different format than previous editions, where the preliminary round is eliminated and all qualified teams enter the group stage. In the group stage, the 24 teams are drawn into eight groups of three, with each group containing one team from each of the three pots. The allocation of teams into pots are based on their national association and qualifying berth. Teams from the same association (excluding "wildcard" teams which replace a team from another association) cannot be drawn with each other in the group stage, and each group is guaranteed to contain a team from either the United States or Mexico, meaning U.S. and Mexican teams cannot play each other in the group stage. Each group is played on a home-and-away round-robin basis. The winners of each group advance to the quarterfinal round of the championship stage.

In the championship stage, the eight teams play a single-elimination tournament. Each tie is played on a home-and-away two-legged basis. The away goals rule is used if the aggregate score is level after normal time of the second leg, but not after extra time, and so a tie is decided by penalty shoot-out if the aggregate score is level after extra time of the second leg. Unlike previous years where a second draw was conducted to set the pairings for the championship stage, the bracket is determined by the teams' record in the group stage. The quarterfinals match the team with the best record against the team with the worst record, while the second-best team faces the seventh-best, third against sixth and fourth against fifth. The top four teams play the second leg at home. In the semi-finals, the winner of 1-vs-8 faces the winner of 4-vs-5, with the 1-vs-8 winner hosting the second leg, and likewise 2-vs-7 plays 3-vs-6, with the 2-vs-7 winner hosting the second leg. In the finals, the team that prevails out of the upper bracket of 1–8–4–5 hosts the second leg. This means that the higher-seeded team does not necessarily host the second leg in the semi-finals and finals.

==== Elimination of group stage (2018–2023) ====
In December 2016, Manuel Quintanilla, president of the Nicaraguan Football Federation, spoke of a possible new format for the competition, a statement that was later corroborated by Garth Lagerwey, the general manager of Seattle Sounders FC. On 23 January 2017, CONCACAF confirmed the new 16-team format beginning with the 2018 edition, eliminating the group stage which had been employed since the re-branding of the competition to the CONCACAF Champions League in 2008.

Under the new CONCACAF competition platform, a new secondary tournament called CONCACAF League would be played from August to December beginning in 2017. The winner of CONCACAF League would qualify to the following year's Champions League where they would be joined by nine North American teams, the Caribbean Club Championship winner, and five Central American league champions who qualified directly. For the 2019–20 competition cycle, the direct Central American berths were removed and CONCACAF League was expanded so that the top-six clubs would qualify to Champions League.

The CONCACAF Champions League under this format had four rounds – round of 16, quarterfinals, semi-finals, and a final – with each being a home-and-away two-legged basis with the away goals rule. However, beginning in 2019, the away goals rule would not be applied for the final round.

=== Second Champions Cup era (2024–present) ===
In February 2021, CONCACAF announced a major overhaul of the tournament which would have included 50 teams and a regional group stage. Twenty teams from North America, twenty from Central America, and ten from the Caribbean would have been divided into groups of five, and a total of 16 teams would advance to the knockout stage. This format was abandoned and was never used.

In September of that year, CONCACAF announced an expansion of the tournament to begin in 2024. The tournament will retain the all-knockout format used since 2018 but will now consist of five rounds and 27 teams participating:

- 6 Liga MX clubs
- 5 MLS clubs
- 2 Canadian Premier League clubs
- 1 U.S. Open Cup winner
- 1 Canadian Championship winner
- 3 Leagues Cup clubs
- 6 Central America Cup clubs
- 3 Caribbean Cup clubs

Twenty-two clubs will enter the tournament in Round One while five clubs (the winners of MLS Cup, Liga MX, Leagues Cup, Central American Cup, and Caribbean Cup) receive byes to the round of 16.

Teams may qualify for the CONCACAF Champions League through their domestic leagues or cups, or through their regional cup competitions: the Leagues Cup for teams from North America, the Central American Cup for teams from Central America, and a CONCACAF Caribbean Cup for teams from the Caribbean. All matches will include home and away series between the first round to the semi-finals, with the final being a single match. The CONCACAF League would also cease in 2022 with this new format.

On 6 June 2023, it was announced that to coincide with the new format, the competition had been renamed back to CONCACAF Champions Cup.

== Stadium standards ==
If a club fails to meet the standards for its home stadium, the club must find a suitable stadium in its own country, and if the club fails to provide the adequate facilities, it runs the risk of being replaced by another team. Real Esteli of Nicaragua failed stadium requirements and was replaced by another team for the 2009–10 and 2010–11 seasons. Estadio Independencia in Nicaragua has since been renovated, including upgrades to stadium lighting, and Nicaraguan teams now participate. The qualifying team from Belize failed stadium requirements and was replaced by another team in each season from 2009–2010 through 2014–15.

On 8 April 2015, Mexican side Club América broke the all time CONCACAF Champions League match attendance record when a reported 66,208 spectators gathered at the Estadio Azteca in Mexico City to watch América play Costa Rican club Herediano in the second leg of the semi-finals of the 2015 edition of the tournament. This was surpassed by the Seattle Sounders FC on 4 May 2022, at Lumen Field in the final against Pumas with an announced attendance of 68,741.

== Prizes and sponsorship ==
=== Prize money ===
Starting with the 2024 edition of the competition, the winning club will receive over US$5,000,000 in prize money and financial distributions. In addition, the winning club qualifies for the FIFA Club World Cup, which includes additional prize money.

In 2022, the prize money paid to clubs was $500,000 for the champions, $300,000 for the runners-up, and $200,000 for each semi-finalist.

=== Trophy and medals ===
Each year, the winning team is presented with the CONCACAF Champions Cup trophy. The current trophy design was introduced in 2018 and was designed and made by Thomas Lyte.

=== Sponsorship ===
The CONCACAF Champions Cup has several corporate sponsors: Scotiabank (which was a title sponsor of the Champions League from 2014–2015 until 2023), Miller Lite, MoneyGram, Maxxis Tires, and Nike. The sponsors' names appear on the boards around the perimeter of the field, and boards for pre-game and post-game interviews and press conferences. As of 2024, Molten is the official provider of game balls through 2030.

American Airlines was the title sponsor for the Champions' Cup in the 1990s.

== Broadcasting ==
The CONCACAF Champions Cup broadcast is also available in English through Concacaf GO for the countries without broadcasting rights.

| Region | Broadcaster | Language |
|---|---|---|
| Africa | ESPN | English |
| Austria | Sportdigital | German |
| Germany | Sportdigital | German |
| Switzerland | Sportdigital | German |
| Brunei | Astro SuperSport | English |
| Malaysia | Astro SuperSport | English |
| Cambodia | Monomax | Thai |
| Laos | Monomax | Thai |
| Thailand | Monomax | Thai |
| Canada | OneSoccer | English/French |
| Caribbean | Flow Sports | English |
| Costa Rica | ESPN; Repretel; Teletica | Spanish |
| Croatia | Sport Klub | Croatian |
| Slovenia | Sport Klub | Slovenian |
| El Salvador | ESPN; Canal 4 | Spanish |
| Guatemala | ESPN; RTVG | Spanish |
| Honduras | ESPN; Televicentro | Spanish |
| Indian subcontinent | Fancode | English |
| Israel | Charlton | Hebrew |
| Japan | NTV | Japanese |
| Mexico | Fox | Spanish |
| Netherlands | ESPN | Dutch |
| Panama | ESPN; Mediapro (NexTV) | Spanish |
| Poland | Polsat Sport | Polish |
| Portugal | Sport TV | Portuguese |
| South America | ESPN | Portuguese (BRA only) and Spanish (exc. BRA) |
| South Korea | Coupang Play | Korean |
| Spain | Movistar Plus+ | Spanish |
| Turkey | D-Smart | Turkish |
| United States | CBS Sports | English and Spanish |

== Results ==
From the inaugural edition in 1962, the tournament has been held in 61 editions, only not held or completed on four occasions (1964, 1965, 1966 and 2001).

44 clubs from 12 national associations have competed for the title as champions or runners-up, of which 30 clubs from nine national associations have won at least one title (Mexico, Costa Rica, United States, El Salvador, Suriname, Honduras, Trinidad and Tobago, Guatemala, and Haiti).

Under the finals format, 39 clubs from 11 national associations have played in the finals for the title, of which 26 clubs from eight national associations have won at least one title.

Since the 2008–09 season, only clubs from Mexico, United States, and Canada have reached the finals, with Mexican clubs winning 17 of the 18 titles contested and one title won by a club from the United States. The last team from Central America to reach the final was Saprissa in 2008, and Saprissa was also the last Central American team to win the title in 2005. The last Caribbean appearance at the final was in 1991 with Police of Trinidad and Tobago, and the last Caribbean title was in 1985 with Defence Force, also of Trinidad and Tobago.

== Performances ==
Performance by club
| Club | Titles | Runners-up | Years won | Years runners-up |
|---|---|---|---|---|
| (Mexico) Cruz Azul | 7 | 2 | 1969, 1970, 1971, 1996, 1997, 2013–14, 2025 | 2008–09, 2009–10 |
| (Mexico) América | 7 | 1 | 1977, 1987, 1990, 1992, 2006, 2014–15, 2015–16 | 2021 |
| (Mexico) Pachuca | 6 | 0 | 2002, 2007, 2008, 2009–10, 2016–17, 2024 | — |
| (Mexico) Monterrey | 5 | 0 | 2010–11, 2011–12, 2012–13, 2019, 2021 | — |
| (Mexico) Toluca | 3 | 3 | 1968, 2003, 2026 | 1998, 2006, 2013–14 |
| (Costa Rica) Saprissa | 3 | 2 | 1993, 1995, 2005 | 2004, 2008 |
| (Mexico) Pumas | 3 | 2 | 1980, 1982, 1989 | 2005, 2022 |
| (Suriname) Transvaal | 2 | 3 | 1973, 1981 | 1974, 1975, 1986 |
| (Costa Rica) Alajuelense | 2 | 3 | 1986, 2004 | 1971, 1992, 1999 |
| (Mexico) Guadalajara | 2 | 2 | 1962, 2018 | 1963, 2007 |
| (Honduras) Olimpia | 2 | 2 | 1972, 1988 | 1985, 2000 |
| (Trinidad and Tobago) Defence Force | 2 | 2 | 1978, (Note: Title shared. The final round was not held, with the winners of the North American, Central American and Caribbean zones all declared joint champions.) 1985 | 1987, 1988 |
| (Mexico) Atlante | 2 | 1 | 1983, 2008–09 | 1994 |
| (Mexico) Tigres UANL | 1 | 4 | 2020 | 2015–16, 2016–17, 2019, 2026 |
| (Guatemala) Comunicaciones | 1 | 2 | 1978 | 1962, 1969 |
| (Guatemala) Municipal | 1 | 1 | 1974 | 1995 |
| (Mexico) Necaxa | 1 | 1 | 1999 | 1996 |
| (United States) LA Galaxy | 1 | 1 | 2000 | 1997 |
| (Mexico) León | 1 | 1 | 2023 | 1993 |
| (Haiti) Racing CH | 1 | 0 | 1963 | — |
| (El Salvador) Alianza | 1 | 0 | 1967 | — |
| (Mexico) Atlético Español | 1 | 0 | 1975 | — |
| (El Salvador) Águila | 1 | 0 | 1976 | — |
| (Mexico) UdeG | 1 | 0 | 1978 | — |
| (El Salvador) FAS | 1 | 0 | 1979 | — |
| (Haiti) Violette | 1 | 0 | 1984 | — |
| (Mexico) Puebla | 1 | 0 | 1991 | — |
| (Costa Rica) Cartaginés | 1 | 0 | 1994 | — |
| (United States) D.C. United | 1 | 0 | 1998 | — |
| (United States) Seattle Sounders FC | 1 | 0 | 2022 | — |
| (Suriname) Robinhood | 0 | 5 | — | 1972, 1976, 1977, 1982, 1983 |
| (Curaçao) Jong Colombia | 0 | 2 | — | 1967, 1979 |
| (Cuba) Pinar del Río | 0 | 2 | — | 1989, 1990 |
| (Mexico) Morelia | 0 | 2 | — | 2002, 2003 |
| (Mexico) Santos Laguna | 0 | 2 | — | 2011–12, 2012–13 |
| (United States) Los Angeles FC | 0 | 2 | — | 2020, 2023 |
| (Honduras) Universidad | 0 | 1 | — | 1980 |
| (El Salvador) Atlético Marte | 0 | 1 | — | 1981 |
| (Trinidad and Tobago) Police | 0 | 1 | — | 1991 |
| (United States) Real Salt Lake | 0 | 1 | — | 2010–11 |
| (Canada) CF Montréal | 0 | 1 | — | 2014–15 |
| (Canada) Toronto FC | 0 | 1 | — | 2018 |
| (United States) Columbus Crew | 0 | 1 | — | 2024 |
| (Canada) Vancouver Whitecaps FC | 0 | 1 | — | 2025 |

Performance by nation
| Nation | Titles | Runners-up | Total |
|---|---|---|---|
| Mexico (Note: includes one shared title.) | 41 | 21 | 62 |
| Costa Rica | 6 | 5 | 11 |
| United States | 3 | 5 | 8 |
| El Salvador | 3 | 1 | 4 |
| Suriname | 2 | 8 | 10 |
| Honduras | 2 | 3 | 5 |
| Trinidad and Tobago | 2 | 3 | 5 |
| Guatemala | 2 | 3 | 5 |
| Haiti | 2 | 0 | 2 |
| Canada | 0 | 3 | 3 |
| Cuba | 0 | 2 | 2 |
| Curaçao | 0 | 2 | 2 |

== See also ==
- CONCACAF
- CONCACAF Cup Winners Cup
- CONCACAF Giants Cup
- CONCACAF League
- CONCACAF Central American Cup
- CONCACAF Caribbean Cup
- Leagues Cup
- Continental football championships
- List of association football competitions
