= CONCACAF Champions Cup and Champions League records and statistics =

This page details statistics of the CONCACAF Champions Cup/Champions League. Unless notified, these statistics concern all editions since the inaugural edition of the competition in 1962.

== Champions and runners-up ==
Performances by club
Club	Titles	Runners-up	Winning editions
(Mexico) Cruz Azul	7	2	1969, 1970, 1971, 1996, 1997, 2013–14, 2025
(Mexico) América	7	1	1977, 1987, 1990, 1992, 2006, 2014–15, 2015–16
(Mexico) Pachuca	6	0	2002, 2007, 2008, 2009–10, 2016–17, 2024
(Mexico) Monterrey	5	0	2010–11, 2011–12, 2012–13, 2019, 2021
(Mexico) Toluca	3	3	1968, 2003, 2026
(Costa Rica) Saprissa	3	3	1993, 1995, 2005
(Mexico) Pumas UNAM	3	2	1980, 1982, 1989
(Suriname) Transvaal	2	3	1973, 1981
(Costa Rica) Alajuelense	2	3	1986, 2004
(Mexico) Guadalajara	2	2	1962, 2018
(Honduras) Olimpia	2	2	1972, 1988
(Trinidad and Tobago) Defence Force	2	2	1978,^{1} 1985
(Mexico) Atlante	2	1	1983, 2008–09
(Mexico) Tigres UANL	1	4	2020
(Guatemala) Comunicaciones	1	2	1978^{1}
(Guatemala) Municipal	1	1	1974
(Mexico) Necaxa	1	1	1999
(United States) LA Galaxy	1	1	2000
(Mexico) León	1	1	2023
(Haiti) Racing CH	1	0	1963
(El Salvador) Alianza	1	0	1967
(Mexico) Atlético Español	1	0	1975
(El Salvador) Águila	1	0	1976
(Mexico) UdeG	1	0	1978^{1}
(El Salvador) FAS	1	0	1979
(Haiti) Violette	1	0	1984
(Mexico) Puebla	1	0	1991
(Costa Rica) Cartaginés	1	0	1994
(United States) D.C. United	1	0	1998
(United States) Seattle Sounders FC	1	0	2022
(Suriname) Robinhood	0	5	–
(Curaçao) Jong Colombia	0	2	–
(Cuba) Pinar del Río	0	2	–
(Mexico) Morelia	0	2	–
(Mexico) Santos Laguna	0	2	–
(United States) Los Angeles FC	0	2	–
(Honduras) UNAH	0	1	–
(El Salvador) Atlético Marte	0	1	–
(Trinidad and Tobago) Police	0	1	–
(United States) Real Salt Lake	0	1	–
(Canada) CF Montréal	0	1	–
(Canada) Toronto FC	0	1	–
(United States) Columbus Crew	0	1	–
(Canada) Vancouver Whitecaps FC	0	1	–

Notes

1. Title shared, the winners of the North American, Central American and Caribbean zones were declared joint champions.

Performances by nation
Nation	Titles	Runners-up	Champions	Runners-up
Mexico	41	21	América (7); Cruz Azul (7); Pachuca (6); Monterrey (5); Pumas UNAM (3); Toluca (3); Atlante (2); Guadalajara (2); Necaxa (1); León (1); Puebla (1); Tigres UANL (1); Atlético Español (1); UdeG (1)	Tigres UANL (4); Toluca (3); Cruz Azul (2); Guadalajara (2); Morelia (2); Pumas UNAM (2); Santos Laguna (2); América (1); Atlante (1); Necaxa (1); León (1)
Costa Rica	6	6	Saprissa (3); Alajuelense (2); Cartaginés (1)	Saprissa (3); Alajuelense (3)
United States	3	5	D.C. United (1); LA Galaxy (1); Seattle Sounders FC (1)	Los Angeles FC (2); LA Galaxy (1); Real Salt Lake (1); Columbus Crew (1)
El Salvador	3	1	Águila (1); Alianza (1); FAS (1)	Atlético Marte (1)
Suriname	2	8	Transvaal (2)	Robinhood (5); Transvaal (3)
Guatemala	2	3	Municipal (1); Comunicaciones (1)	Comunicaciones (2); Municipal (1)
Trinidad and Tobago	2	3	Defence Force (2)	Defence Force (2); Police (1)
Honduras	2	3	Olimpia (2)	Olimpia (2); UNAH (1)
Haiti	2	0	Racing CH (1); Violette (1)	–
Cuba	0	2	–	Pinar del Río (2)
Curaçao	0	2	–	Jong Colombia (2)
Canada	0	3	–	CF Montréal (1); Toronto FC (1); Vancouver Whitecaps FC (1)

== Records and statistics ==
As of 2023 CONCACAF Champions League

In this ranking 3 points are awarded for a win, 1 for a draw and 0 for a loss. As per statistical convention in football, matches decided in extra time are counted as wins and losses, while matches decided by penalty shoot-outs are counted as draws. Teams are ranked by total points, then by goal difference, then by goals scored.

This table includes only Final Rounds as listed by CONCACAF.

Champions' Cup Club all time records (Top 50)
Rank	Club	Pld	W	D	L	GF	GA	GD	Pts
1	(Mexico) Cruz Azul	78	47	17	14	176	61	+115	148
2	(Mexico) Santos Laguna	69	38	11	20	156	86	+70	122
3	(Mexico) Monterrey	54	34	13	7	105	38	+67	113
4	(Mexico) América	59	33	14	12	127	56	+71	100
5	(Costa Rica) Saprissa	81	29	24	28	118	113	+5	99
6	(Costa Rica) Alajuelense	70	35	13	22	102	78	+24	96
7	(Mexico) Pachuca	53	32	10	11	112	49	+63	93
8	(Mexico) Pumas UNAM	57	28	16	13	119	64	+55	92
9	(Honduras) Olimpia	71	28	15	28	99	87	+12	90
10	(Mexico) Tigres UANL	46	24	11	11	81	41	+40	83
11	(United States) Seattle Sounders FC	50	21	11	18	87	75	+12	74
12	(Mexico) Toluca	50	23	13	14	90	56	+34	73
13	(United States) D.C. United	49	24	9	16	70	59	+23	68
14	(United States) LA Galaxy	42	21	8	13	69	55	+14	65
15	(Costa Rica) Herediano	40	16	10	14	65	63	+2	58
16	(Guatemala) Comunicaciones	53	18	10	25	70	86	−16	58
17	(Canada) Toronto FC	36	15	10	11	49	48	+1	55
18	(Canada) CF Montréal	32	13	10	9	42	36	+6	49
19	(United States) Houston Dynamo	36	14	10	12	44	43	+1	49
20	(Panama) Árabe Unido	34	16	2	16	47	52	−5	49
21	(Guatemala) Municipal	44	14	11	19	102	73	+25	47
22	Puerto Rico Islanders	34	12	10	12	45	51	−6	46
23	(Honduras) Marathón	32	14	3	15	48	62	−14	45
24	(United States) Real Salt Lake	22	11	6	5	34	22	+12	39
25	(United States) Sporting Kansas City	28	12	6	10	40	41	−1	39
26	(Mexico) Guadalajara	22	12	4	6	39	16	+23	35
27	(United States) New York Red Bulls	22	8	8	6	27	19	+8	32
28	(United States) FC Dallas	18	9	3	6	27	24	+3	30
29	(Mexico) Tijuana	20	8	6	6	26	23	+3	30
30	(El Salvador) Isidro Metapán	36	9	3	24	44	92	−48	30
31	(Mexico) Atlante	18	9	5	4	28	16	+12	32
32	(Mexico) Monarcas Morelia	25	12	3	10	54	26	+30	39
33	(United States) Columbus Crew	20	8	4	8	26	30	−4	28
34	(Mexico) León	18	6	7	5	25	18	+7	25
35	(Panama) Tauro	20	6	6	18	31	53	−22	24
36	(Trinidad and Tobago) W Connection	30	5	7	18	33	66	−33	22
37	(United States) Portland Timbers	12	6	3	3	31	19	+10	21
38	(Canada) Vancouver Whitecaps FC	12	6	2	4	16	12	+4	20
39	(El Salvador) FAS	24	6	8	12	24	41	-17	26
40	(Honduras) Real España	21	5	4	12	26	39	−13	19
41	(Mexico) Necaxa	12	7	4	1	23	17	+6	25
42	(United States) San Jose Earthquakes	14	7	2	5	16	16	0	23
43	(El Salvador) Alianza	16	6	3	7	22	20	+2	21
44	(El Salvador) Luis Ángel Firpo	12	4	5	3	14	13	+1	17
45	(Panama) San Francisco	18	5	2	11	25	33	−8	17
46	(United States) Chicago Fire	10	6	0	4	16	12	+4	16
47	(United States) New York City FC	10	5	1	4	19	17	+2	16
48	(Honduras) Motagua	24	3	7	14	17	40	−23	16
49	(Trinidad and Tobago) Joe Public	16	4	2	10	22	41	−19	14
50	(United States) Atlanta United FC	8	4	1	3	11	10	+1	13
51	(Mexico) Querétaro	8	3	3	2	14	5	+9	12

Champions' Cup Club all time records (Bottom 50)
Rank	Club	Pld	W	D	L	GF	GA	GD	Pts
52	(United States) Colorado Rapids	10	3	2	5	10	15	−5	11
53	(United States) Philadelphia Union	6	3	1	2	9	5	+4	10
54	(Suriname) Transvaal	16	3	4	9	15	25	−10	10
55	(United States) Los Angeles FC	5	3	0	2	9	6	+3	9
56	(Guatemala) Xelajú	8	2	3	3	10	13	−3	9
57	(Mexico) Atlético Español	4	4	0	0	9	3	+6	8
58	(Trinidad and Tobago) Defence Force	10	3	2	5	7	13	−6	8
59	(Costa Rica) Cartaginés	7	2	2	3	7	20	-13	8
60	(Panama) Independiente	4	2	1	1	7	5	+2	7
61	Honduras Progreso	4	2	1	1	4	4	0	7
62	(United States) New England Revolution	8	2	1	5	7	15	−8	7
63	(Nicaragua) Real Estelí	20	0	7	13	9	30	−21	7
64	(Jamaica) Waterhouse	4	2	0	2	7	5	+2	6
65	(Guatemala) Heredia	4	2	0	2	2	3	−1	6
66	(Suriname) Robinhood	17	0	6	11	6	45	−39	6
67	(United States) Rochester Lancers	5	2	1	2	6	5	+1	5
68	(Guatemala) Suchitepéquez	4	1	2	1	4	6	−2	5
69	(El Salvador) Santa Tecla	6	1	2	3	5	10	−5	5
70	(El Salvador) Águila	7	2	1	4	9	19	-10	5
71	(Trinidad and Tobago) Central	8	1	2	5	7	17	−10	5
72	(Trinidad and Tobago) Police	4	1	2	1	3	4	−1	4
73	(Panama) Plaza Amador	4	1	1	2	3	6	−3	4
74	(Panama) Universitario	8	1	1	6	4	20	−16	4
75	(Belize) Verdes	6	1	1	4	2	29	−27	4
76	(Mexico) Puebla	2	1	1	0	4	2	+2	3
77	(United States) Austin FC	2	1	0	1	2	3	–1	3
78	(Costa Rica) Liberia	2	1	0	1	3	6	−3	3
79	(Panama) Sporting San Miguelito	4	1	0	3	1	6	−5	3
80	(Guatemala) Jalapa	4	1	0	3	2	15	−13	3
81	(Trinidad and Tobago) San Juan Jabloteh	12	2	0	10	12	31	−19	5
82	(Trinidad and Tobago) United Petrotrin	2	1	0	1	4	4	0	2
83	(United States) Orlando City SC	2	0	2	0	1	1	0	2
84	(Costa Rica) Puntarenas	2	1	0	1	1	2	−1	2
85	(Bermuda) Pembroke Hamilton	2	1	0	1	1	4	−3	2
86	(Guatemala) Antigua	4	0	2	2	2	7	−5	2
87	(Cuba) Pinar del Río	4	0	2	2	4	12	−8	2
88	(Curaçao) Jong Colombia	5	1	0	4	5	18	−13	2
89	(Guatemala) Aurora	1	0	1	0	1	1	0	1
90	(Guadeloupe) US Robert	1	0	1	0	0	0	0	1
91	(El Salvador) Atlético Marte	2	0	1	1	1	2	−1	1
92	(Jamaica) Arnett Gardens	2	0	1	1	0	1	−1	1
93	(Curaçao) RKV Sithoc	2	0	1	1	1	3	−2	1
94	(Costa Rica) Brujas	2	0	1	1	4	6	−2	1
95	(United States) Chivas USA	2	0	1	1	1	3	−2	1
96	(Jamaica) Montego Bay United	4	0	1	3	4	11	−7	1
97	(El Salvador) Dragón	4	0	1	3	2	10	−8	1
98	(Trinidad and Tobago) Caledonia AIA	8	0	1	7	5	21	−16	1
99	(Guyana) Alpha United	6	0	1	5	3	27	−24	1
100	(Costa Rica) San Carlos	2	0	0	2	3	6	−3	0
101	(Canada) Forge FC	2	0	0	2	1	4	−3	0
102	(Jamaica) Harbour View	1	0	0	1	0	3	−3	0
103	(Jamaica) Portmore United	2	0	0	2	1	6	−5	0
104	(Guatemala) Guastatoya	4	0	0	4	1	6	−5	0
105	(Dominican Republic) Atlético Pantoja	2	0	0	2	0	5	−5	0
106	(Nicaragua) Walter Ferretti	4	0	0	4	2	8	−6	0
107	(Costa Rica) Santos de Guápiles	2	0	0	2	0	6	−6	0
108	(Haiti) Tempête	2	0	0	2	0	7	−7	0
109	(Dominican Republic) Cibao	2	0	0	2	0	7	−7	0
110	(Haiti) Valencia	4	0	0	4	4	15	−11	0
111	(Honduras) Victoria	4	0	0	4	4	15	−11	0
112	(Haiti) Don Bosco	4	0	0	4	2	13	−11	0
113	Puerto Rico Bayamón	4	0	0	4	2	23	−21	0
114	(Belize) Police United	4	0	0	4	1	23	−22	0

=== Records since the beginning of the CONCACAF Champions League era ===
==== By club ====
Participation by club
Nation	Clubs	No.	Seasons
United States (25)	Seattle Sounders FC	9	2010–11, 2011–12, 2012–13, 2015–16, 2018, 2020, 2022, 2025, 2026
United States (25)	LA Galaxy	7	2010–11, 2011–12, 2012–13, 2013–14, 2015–16, 2025, 2026
United States (25)	Houston Dynamo FC	6	2008–09, 2009–10, 2012–13, 2013–14, 2019, 2024
United States (25)	New York Red Bulls	5	2009–10, 2014–15, 2016–17, 2018, 2019
United States (25)	Columbus Crew	5	2009–10, 2010–11, 2021, 2024, 2025
United States (25)	Sporting Kansas City	5	2013–14, 2014–15, 2016–17, 2019, 2025
United States (25)	D.C. United	4	2008–09, 2009–10, 2014–15, 2015–16
United States (25)	New England Revolution	4	2008–09, 2022, 2024, 2027
United States (25)	Real Salt Lake	4	2010–11, 2012–13, 2015–16, 2025
United States (25)	Colorado Rapids	4	2011–12, 2018, 2022, 2025
United States (25)	Los Angeles FC	4	2020, 2023, 2025, 2026
United States (25)	Philadelphia Union	4	2021, 2023, 2024, 2026
United States (25)	Inter Miami CF	4	2024, 2025, 2026, 2027
United States (25)	FC Dallas	3	2011–12, 2016–17, 2018
United States (25)	Portland Timbers	3	2014–15, 2016–17, 2021
United States (25)	Atlanta United FC	3	2019, 2020, 2021
United States (25)	FC Cincinnati	3	2024, 2025, 2026
United States (25)	Nashville SC	3	2024, 2026, 2027
United States (25)	New York City FC	2	2020, 2022
United States (25)	Orlando City SC	2	2023, 2024
United States (25)	St. Louis City SC	2	2024, 2027
United States (25)	Chivas USA	1	2008–09
United States (25)	San Jose Earthquakes	1	2013–14
United States (25)	Austin FC	1	2023
United States (25)	San Diego FC	1	2026
Mexico (15)	Cruz Azul	11	2008–09, 2009–10, 2010–11, 2013–14, 2014–15, 2020, 2021, 2022, 2025, 2026, 2027
Mexico (15)	Tigres UANL	11	2012–13, 2015–16, 2016–17, 2018, 2019, 2020, 2023, 2024, 2025, 2026, 2027
Mexico (15)	Monterrey	10	2010–11, 2011–12, 2012–13, 2016–17, 2019, 2021, 2024, 2025, 2026, 2027
Mexico (15)	América	10	2013–14, 2014–15, 2015–16, 2018, 2020, 2021, 2024, 2025, 2026, 2027
Mexico (15)	Pumas UNAM	8	2008–09, 2009–10, 2011–12, 2016–17, 2022, 2025, 2026, 2027
Mexico (15)	Santos Laguna	7	2008–09, 2010–11, 2011–12, 2012–13, 2015–16, 2019, 2022
Mexico (15)	Toluca	7	2009–10, 2010–11, 2013–14, 2019, 2024, 2026, 2027
Mexico (15)	Pachuca	6	2009–10, 2014–15, 2016–17, 2023, 2024, 2027
Mexico (15)	León	6	2014–15, 2020, 2021, 2022, 2023, 2027
Mexico (15)	Guadalajara	5	2012–13, 2018, 2024, 2025, 2027
Mexico (15)	Tijuana	2	2013–14, 2018
Mexico (15)	Atlante	1	2008–09
Mexico (15)	Atlético Morelia	1	2011–12
Mexico (15)	Querétaro	1	2015–16
Mexico (15)	Atlas	1	2023
Guatemala (8)	Comunicaciones	8	2009–10, 2011–12, 2013–14, 2014–15, 2015–16, 2020, 2022, 2024
Guatemala (8)	Municipal	6	2008–09, 2010–11, 2011–12, 2012–13, 2014–15, 2015–16
Guatemala (8)	Xelajú	3	2010–11, 2012–13, 2026
Guatemala (8)	Jalapa	2	2008–09, 2009–10
Guatemala (8)	Antigua	2	2016–17, 2025
Guatemala (8)	Guastatoya	2	2019, 2022
Guatemala (8)	Heredia	1	2013–14
Guatemala (8)	Suchitepéquez	1	2016–17
Costa Rica (8)	Saprissa	13	2008–09, 2009–10, 2010–11, 2014–15, 2015–16, 2016–17, 2018, 2020, 2021, 2022, 2024, 2025, 2027
Costa Rica (8)	Alajuelense	11	2008–09, 2011–12, 2012–13, 2013–14, 2014–15, 2021, 2023, 2024, 2025, 2026, 2027
Costa Rica (8)	Herediano	11	2009–10, 2011–12, 2012–13, 2013–14, 2014–15, 2015–16, 2016–17, 2018, 2019, 2024, 2025
Costa Rica (8)	Cartaginés	3	2013–14, 2026, 2027
Costa Rica (8)	Municipal Liberia	1	2009–10
Costa Rica (8)	Brujas	1	2010–11
Costa Rica (8)	San Carlos	1	2020
Costa Rica (8)	Santos de Guápiles	1	2022
Canada (7)	Toronto FC	7	2009–10, 2010–11, 2011–12, 2012–13, 2018, 2019, 2021
Canada (7)	Vancouver Whitecaps FC	7	2015–16, 2016–17, 2023, 2024, 2025, 2026, 2027
Canada (7)	Montreal Impact/CF Montréal	5	2008–09, 2013–14, 2014–15, 2020, 2022
Canada (7)	Forge FC	5	2022, 2024, 2025, 2026, 2027
Canada (7)	Cavalry FC	2	2024, 2025
Canada (7)	Atlético Ottawa	2	2026, 2027
Canada (7)	Vancouver FC	1	2026
El Salvador (7)	Isidro Metapán	8	2008–09, 2009–10, 2010–11, 2011–12, 2012–13, 2013–14, 2014–15, 2015–16
El Salvador (7)	Alianza	5	2011–12, 2016–17, 2019, 2020, 2023
El Salvador (7)	Luis Ángel Firpo	3	2008–09, 2009–10, 2013–14
El Salvador (7)	FAS	3	2010–11, 2012–13, 2014–15
El Salvador (7)	Santa Tecla	2	2015–16, 2018
El Salvador (7)	Águila	1	2012–13
El Salvador (7)	Dragón	1	2016–17
Panama (7)	Tauro	7	2008–09, 2010–11, 2011–12, 2012–13, 2014–15, 2018, 2023
Panama (7)	San Francisco	5	2008–09, 2009–10, 2010–11, 2011–12, 2015–16
Panama (7)	Árabe Unido	5	2009–10, 2010–11, 2013–14, 2015–16, 2016–17
Panama (7)	Universitario	2	2012–13, 2014–15
Panama (7)	Sporting San Miguelito	2	2013–14, 2026
Panama (7)	Independiente	2	2019, 2024
Panama (7)	Plaza Amador	1	2016–17
Haiti (7)	Tempête	1	2011–12
Haiti (7)	Valencia	1	2013–14
Haiti (7)	Don Bosco	1	2016–17
Haiti (7)	Arcahaie	1	2021
Haiti (7)	Cavaly	1	2022
Haiti (7)	Violette	1	2023
Haiti (7)	Real Hope	1	2025
Honduras (6)	Olimpia	15	2008–09, 2009–10, 2010–11, 2011–12, 2012–13, 2013–14, 2014–15, 2015–16, 2016–17, 2018, 2020, 2021, 2023, 2026, 2027
Honduras (6)	Motagua	9	2010–11, 2011–12, 2015–16, 2018, 2020, 2022, 2023, 2025, 2027
Honduras (6)	Marathón	7	2008–09, 2009–10, 2010–11, 2012–13, 2019, 2021, 2027
Honduras (6)	Real España	5	2009–10, 2011–12, 2014–15, 2023, 2026
Honduras (6)	Victoria	1	2013–14
Honduras (6)	Honduras Progreso	1	2016–17
Trinidad and Tobago (6)	W Connection	5	2009–10, 2012–13, 2013–14, 2015–16, 2016–17
Trinidad and Tobago (6)	Joe Public	2	2008–09, 2010–11
Trinidad and Tobago (6)	San Juan Jabloteh	2	2009–10, 2010–11
Trinidad and Tobago (6)	Morvant Caledonia United	2	2012–13, 2013–14
Trinidad and Tobago (6)	Central	2	2015–16, 2016–17
Trinidad and Tobago (6)	Defence Force	1	2026
Jamaica (6)	Portmore United	2	2020, 2027
Jamaica (6)	Cavalier	2	2024, 2025
Jamaica (6)	Mount Pleasant	2	2026, 2027
Jamaica (6)	Harbour View	1	2008–09
Jamaica (6)	Waterhouse	1	2014–15
Jamaica (6)	Montego Bay United	1	2015–16
Dominican Republic (4)	Cibao	2	2018, 2025
Dominican Republic (4)	Atlético Pantoja	2	2019, 2021
Dominican Republic (4)	Moca	1	2024
Dominican Republic (4)	O&M	1	2026
Nicaragua (2)	Real Estelí	9	2008–09, 2011–12, 2012–13, 2013–14, 2014–15, 2016–17, 2021, 2024, 2025
Nicaragua (2)	Walter Ferretti	1	2015–16
Puerto Rico (2)	Puerto Rico Islanders	5	2008–09, 2009–10, 2010–11, 2011–12, 2012–13
Puerto Rico (2)	Bayamón	1	2014–15
Belize (2)	Verdes	2	2008–09, 2015–16
Belize (2)	Police United	1	2016–17
Guyana (1)	Alpha United	2	2011–12, 2014–15
Suriname (1)	Robinhood	1	2024

Clubs by semi-final appearances
Club	No.	Years
(Mexico) Cruz Azul	7	**2009**, **2010**, 2011, **2014**, 2021, 2022, **2025**
(Mexico) Tigres UANL	7	**2016**, **2017**, **2019**, **2020**, 2023, 2025, **2026**
(Mexico) Monterrey	6	**2011**, **2012**, **2013**, **2019**, **2021,** 2024
(Mexico) América	6	**2015**, **2016**, 2018, 2020, **2021,** 2024
(Mexico) Santos Laguna	5	2009, **2012**, **2013**, 2016, 2019
(Mexico) Pumas UNAM	3	2010, 2012, **2022**
(Mexico) Toluca	3	2010, **2014**, **2026**
(Mexico) Pachuca	3	**2010**, **2017, 2024**
(United States) Los Angeles FC	3	**2020**, **2023**, 2026
(Canada) Toronto FC	2	2012, **2018**
(United States) Seattle Sounders FC	2	2013, **2022**
(Costa Rica) Alajuelense	2	2014, 2015
(Canada) Vancouver Whitecaps FC	2	2017, **2025**
(United States) Philadelphia Union	2	2021, 2023
Puerto Rico Islanders	1	2009
(Mexico) Atlante	1	**2009**
(United States) Real Salt Lake	1	**2011**
(Costa Rica) Saprissa	1	2011
(United States) LA Galaxy	1	2013
(Mexico) Tijuana	1	2014
(Canada) CF Montréal	1	**2015**
(Costa Rica) Herediano	1	2015
(Mexico) Querétaro	1	2016
(United States) FC Dallas	1	2017
(Mexico) Guadalajara	1	**2018**
(United States) New York Red Bulls	1	2018
(United States) Sporting Kansas City	1	2019
(Honduras) Olimpia	1	2020
(United States) New York City FC	1	2022
(Mexico) León	1	**2023**
(United States) Columbus Crew	1	**2024**
(United States) Inter Miami CF	1	2025
(United States) Nashville SC	1	2026

Year in Bold: Club was finalist in that year

==== By country ====
Performances in finals by country
Nation	Titles	Runners-up	Total
Mexico	17	11	28
United States	1	4	5
Canada	0	3	3

Best results by country
Rank	Country	Best result	Teams with result (years)
1	Mexico	Champions (x17)	Monterrey (2011, 2012, 2013, 2019, 2021); Pachuca (2010, 2017, 2024); Cruz Azul (2014, 2025); América (2015, 2016); Atlante (2009); Guadalajara (2018); Tigres UANL (2020); León (2023); Toluca (2026)
2	United States	Champions	Seattle Sounders FC (2022)
3	Canada	Runners-up (x3)	Montreal Impact (2015); Toronto FC (2018); Vancouver Whitecaps FC (2025)
4	Costa Rica	Semi-finals (x4)	Alajuelense (2014, 2015); Saprissa (2011); Herediano (2015)
5	Puerto Rico	Semi-finals	Puerto Rico Islanders (2009)
5	Honduras	Semi-finals	Olimpia (2020)
7	Panama	Quarter-finals (x5)	Árabe Unido (2010, 2014, 2017); Tauro (2018); Independiente (2019)
8	Guatemala	Quarter-finals (x3)	Comunicaciones (2010, 2022); Xelajú (2013)
9	El Salvador	Quarter-finals	Isidro Metapán (2012)
9	Haiti	Quarter-finals	Violette (2023)
11	Dominican Republic	Round of 16 (x3)	Atlético Pantoja (2019, 2021); Cibao (2018)
11	Jamaica	Round of 16 (x3)	Portmore United (2020); Cavalier (2025); Mount Pleasant (2026)
13	Nicaragua	Round of 16	Real Estelí (2021)
13	Suriname	Round of 16	Robinhood (2024)
15	Trinidad and Tobago	Final 16 (Note: Reached 16-team group stage; second round of the tournament) (x4)	W Connection (2010); Joe Public (2009, 2011); San Juan Jabloteh (2010)
16	Belize	Final 24 (Note: Reached preliminary round (2009–2012) or 24-team group stage (2013–2017); first round of the tournament) (x2)	Verdes (2009, 2016); Police United (2017)
17	Guyana	Final 24	Alpha United (2012, 2015)

== Club records ==
These records are only from the Champions League era.

=== Biggest wins ===
- Home:

FC Cincinnati 9–0 O&M (2026)

- Away:

Police United 0–11 Pachuca (2016–17)

=== Highest scoring ===
- Police United 0–11 Pachuca (2016–17)
- Puerto Rico Bayamón 1–10 América (2014–15)

=== Most minutes without conceding a goal ===
- (United States) Real Salt Lake – 587

=== Most consecutive matches unbeaten ===
- (Mexico) Monterrey – 18 matches between 21 April 2004 and 18 August 2011.

== Players ==
These records are only from the Champions League era (2008–09 onwards).

=== All-time top scorers ===
Preliminary round goals included.

Rank	Player	Club(s) (goals)	Goals
1	(Mexico) Javier Orozco	Cruz Azul (23); Santos Laguna (1)	24
2	(Colombia) Darwin Quintero	Santos Laguna (17); América (6)	23
3	(Mexico) Oribe Peralta	Santos Laguna (12); América (10)	22
4	(France) André-Pierre Gignac	Tigres UANL	20
4	(Mexico) Carlos Hermosillo	América (8); Cruz Azul (12)	20
6	(Argentina) Emanuel Villa	Cruz Azul (11); Querétaro (6)	17
7	(Mexico) Aldo de Nigris	Monterrey	16
7	(Chile) Humberto Suazo	Monterrey	16
9	(Gabon) Denis Bouanga	Los Angeles FC	15
10	(Mexico) Ángel Sepúlveda	Cruz Azul (9); Morelia (3); Querétaro (1)	13
11	(Mexico) Darío Carreño	Monterrey (9); Pachuca (3)	12
11	(Mexico) Christian Giménez	Cruz Azul (6); Pachuca (6)	12
11	(United States) Herculez Gomez	Santos Laguna (9); Tijuana (3)	12
11	(Mexico) Octavio Muciño	Cruz Azul (12)	12
11	(Panama) Nicolás Muñoz	Isidro Metapán	12
11	(Costa Rica) Álvaro Saborío	Real Salt Lake (10); Saprissa (2)	12
17	(Paraguay) Édgar Benítez	Pachuca (5); Toluca (4); Querétaro (1)	10
17	(Mexico) Jesús Gallardo	Monterrey (5); Toluca (3); Pumas UNAM (2)	10
17	(Mexico) Raúl Nava	Toluca	10
17	(Guatemala) Guillermo Ramírez	Municipal (9); Motagua (1)	10
17	(Costa Rica) Yendrick Ruiz	Herediano	10
17	(Ecuador) Enner Valencia	Tigres UANL	10

- Last updated: 15 April 2026.

=== Top scorers by season ===
Season	Top scorer(s)	Club(s)	Goals
2008–09	(Mexico) Javier Orozco	(Mexico) Cruz Azul	7
2009–10	(Mexico) Ulises Mendivil	(Mexico) Pachuca	9
2010–11	(Mexico) Javier Orozco	(Mexico) Cruz Azul	11
2011–12	(Chile) Humberto Suazo (Mexico) Oribe Peralta	(Mexico) Monterrey (Mexico) Santos Laguna	7
2012–13	(Panama) Nicolás Muñoz (Colombia) Carlos Quintero	(El Salvador) Isidro Metapán (Mexico) Santos Laguna	6
2013–14	(Mexico) Raúl Nava	(Mexico) Toluca	7
2014–15	(Argentina) Darío Benedetto (Mexico) Oribe Peralta	(Mexico) América	7
2015–16	(Argentina) Emanuel Villa	(Mexico) Querétaro	6
2016–17	(Mexico) Hirving Lozano	(Mexico) Pachuca	8
2018	(Italy) Sebastian Giovinco (Canada) Jonathan Osorio	(Canada) Toronto FC	4
2019	(Ecuador) Enner Valencia	(Mexico) Tigres UANL	7
2020	(France) André-Pierre Gignac	(Mexico) Tigres UANL	6
2021	(Poland) Kacper Przybyłko	(United States) Philadelphia Union	5
2022	(Argentina) Juan Dinenno	(Mexico) Pumas UNAM	9
2023	(Gabon) Denis Bouanga	(United States) Los Angeles FC	7
2024	(Venezuela) Salomón Rondón	(Mexico) Pachuca	9
2025	(Mexico) Ángel Sepúlveda	(Mexico) Cruz Azul	9
2026	(Portugal) Paulinho	(Mexico) Toluca	8

=== Most goals in a single game ===
- 5 goals: Emanuel Villa (Querétaro), 8–0 against Verdes, group stage, 2015–16

=== Most goals in a single season ===
- (Mexico) Javier Orozco – 11 goals (2010–11)

=== Most hat-tricks ===
- (Mexico) Javier Orozco – 5

==== List of hat-tricks ====
Player	For	Against	Result	Date
(Mexico) Javier Orozco	(Mexico) Cruz Azul	(Belize) Hankook Verdes	6–0	27 August 2008
(Guatemala) Guillermo Ramírez	(Guatemala) Municipal	(Mexico) Santos Laguna	4–4	30 October 2008
(Mexico) Agustín Herrera	(Mexico) Santos Laguna	(Guatemala) Municipal	4–4	30 October 2008
(Mexico) Javier Orozco	(Mexico) Cruz Azul	(Costa Rica) Herediano	6–2	30 July 2009
(Mexico) Ulises Mendivil	(Mexico) Pachuca	(Guatemala) Jalapa	7–1	4 August 2009
(Honduras) Carlos Pavón	(Honduras) Real España	(Costa Rica) Liberia Mía	6–0	6 August 2009
(Mexico) Guillermo Ramírez	(Mexico) Cruz Azul	(United States) Columbus Crew	5–0	26 August 2009
(Paraguay) Dante López	(Mexico) Pumas UNAM	(Honduras) Real España	5–1	27 August 2009
(Dominican Republic) Jonathan Faña	(Trinidad and Tobago) W Connection	(Guatemala) Comunicaciones	3–0	23 September 2009
(Panama) Orlando Rodríguez	(Panama) Árabe Unido	(El Salvador) Isidro Metapán	6–0	29 September 2009
(Honduras) Jerry Palacios	(Honduras) Marathón	(Trinidad and Tobago) San Juan Jabloteh	4–2	22 October 2009
(Argentina) Emanuel Villa	(Mexico) Cruz Azul	(Costa Rica) Liberia Mía	3–2	27 July 2010
(Mexico) Javier Orozco	(Mexico) Cruz Azul	(Panama) San Francisco	6–0	3 August 2010
(Mexico) José María Cárdenas	(Mexico) Santos Laguna	(United States) Columbus Crew	5–2	18 August 2010
(Mexico) Javier Orozco	(Mexico) Cruz Azul	(United States) Real Salt Lake	5–4	25 August 2010
(Mexico) Javier Orozco	(Mexico) Cruz Azul	(Panama) Árabe Unido	6–0	15 September 2010
(Chile) Héctor Mancilla	(Mexico) Toluca	(El Salvador) FAS	5–0	20 October 2010
(Costa Rica) Jorge Barbosa	(Costa Rica) Herediano	(Guyana) Alpha United	8–0	26 July 2011
(Mexico) Darío Carreño	(Mexico) Monterrey	(Costa Rica) Herediano	5–0	17 August 2011
(Argentina) Martín Bravo	(Mexico) Pumas UNAM	(Canada) Toronto FC	4–0	14 September 2011
(Mexico) Ángel Reyna	(Mexico) Monterrey	(Panama) Chorrillo	5–0	31 July 2012
(Panama) Nicolás Muñoz	(El Salvador) Isidro Metapán	Puerto Rico Islanders	3–1	1 August 2012
(Colombia) Darwin Quintero	(Mexico) Santos Laguna	(El Salvador) Águila	5–0	21 August 2012
(Mexico) Marco Fabián	(Mexico) Guadalajara	(Trinidad and Tobago) W Connection	4–0	29 August 2012
(Mexico) Alan Pulido	(Mexico) Tigres UANL	(Costa Rica) Alajuelense	5–0	24 October 2012
(Costa Rica) Pablo Herrera	(Costa Rica) Cartaginés	(El Salvador) Isidro Metapán	4–2	8 August 2013
(Uruguay) Paolo Suárez	(Guatemala) Comunicaciones	(Trinidad and Tobago) Caledonia AIA	6–0	29 August 2013
(Cameroon) Achille Emaná	(Mexico) Cruz Azul	(Haiti) Valencia	3–0	24 September 2013
(United States) Herculez Gomez	(Mexico) Tijuana	(Honduras) Victoria	6–0	26 September 2013
(Panama) Nicolás Muñoz ^{4}	(El Salvador) Isidro Metapán	(United States) LA Galaxy	4–0	24 October 2013
(Argentina) Mariano Pavone	(Mexico) Cruz Azul	(United States) Sporting Kansas City	5–1	19 March 2014
(Panama) Rolando Blackburn	(Guatemala) Comunicaciones	Puerto Rico Bayamón	5–0	7 August 2014
(Costa Rica) Ariel Rodríguez	(United States) Sporting Kansas City	(Nicaragua) Real Estelí	3–0	26 August 2014
(Mexico) Darío Carreño	(Mexico) Pachuca	(Guatemala) Municipal	7–3	27 August 2014
(Honduras) Fredixon Elvir	(Honduras) Olimpia	(Guyana) Alpha United	6–0	28 August 2014
(Guatemala) Marvin Ávila	(Guatemala) Municipal	(Honduras) Real España	3–0	17 September 2014
(Colombia) Luis Gabriel Rey	(Mexico) América	Puerto Rico Bayamón	10–1	17 September 2014
(Mexico) Martín Zúñiga	(Mexico) América	Puerto Rico Bayamón	10–1	17 September 2014
(Argentina) Darío Benedetto	(Mexico) América	(Costa Rica) Herediano	5–0	8 April 2015
(Argentina) Darío Benedetto	(Mexico) América	(Canada) Montreal Impact	4–2	29 April 2015
(Argentina) Emanuel Villa ^{5}	(Mexico) Querétaro	(Belize) Verdes	8–0	17 September 2015
(Colombia) Johny Ruiz	(Panama) San Francisco	(Belize) Verdes	8–0	22 October 2015
(Mexico) Hirving Lozano ^{4}	(Mexico) Pachuca	(Belize) Police United	11–0	13 September 2016
(Colombia) Óscar Guerrero	(Mexico) Cruz Azul	(Panama) San Francisco	3–1	18 October 2016
(Argentina) Javier Correa	(Mexico) Santos Laguna	(Honduras) Marathón	6–2	20 February 2019
(Ecuador) Enner Valencia	(Mexico) Tigres UANL	(Costa Rica) Saprissa	5–1	26 February 2019
(Costa Rica) Johan Venegas	(Costa Rica) Saprissa	(Panama) Independiente	3–2	24 September 2019
(Brazil) Héber	(United States) New York City FC	(Costa Rica) San Carlos	5–3	20 February 2020
(Costa Rica) Johan Venegas ^{4}	(Costa Rica) Saprissa	(Guatemala) Municipal	4–1	5 November 2020
(Colombia) Yimmi Chará	(United States) Portland Timbers	(Honduras) Marathón	5–0	13 April 2021
(Gabon) Denis Bouanga	(United States) Los Angeles FC	(Costa Rica) Alajuelense	3–0	9 March 2023
(Argentina) Julián Carranza	(United States) Philadelphia Union	(Costa Rica) Saprissa	3–2	20 February 2024
(Venezuela) Salomón Rondón	(Mexico) Pachuca	(United States) Philadelphia Union	6–0	12 March 2024
(Venezuela) Salomón Rondón	(Mexico) Pachuca	(Costa Rica) Herediano	5–0	3 April 2024
(Gabon) Denis Bouanga	(United States) Los Angeles FC	(Honduras) Real España	6–1	17 February 2026
(Brazil) Gabriel Pec	(United States) LA Galaxy	(Jamaica) Mount Pleasant	3–0	11 March 2026
(Portugal) Paulinho	(Mexico) Toluca	(United States) LA Galaxy	4–2	8 April 2026

- ^{4} Player scored 4 goals
- ^{5} Player scored 5 goals

== Winning managers ==
=== By season ===
Season	Manager	Club
1962	(Mexico) Javier de la Torre	(Mexico) Guadalajara
1963	(Haiti) Antoine Tassy	(Haiti) Racing Haïtien
1967	(Chile) Hernán Carrasco	(El Salvador) Alianza
1968	(Mexico) Ignacio Trelles	(Mexico) Toluca
1969	(Mexico) Raúl Cárdenas	(Mexico) Cruz Azul
1970	(Mexico) Raúl Cárdenas	(Mexico) Cruz Azul
1971	(Mexico) Raúl Cárdenas	(Mexico) Cruz Azul
1972	(Colombia) Carlos Viera	(Honduras) Olimpia
1973	(Suriname (Kingdom of the Netherlands)) Jules Lagadeau	(Suriname (Kingdom of the Netherlands)) Transvaal
1974	(Uruguay) Rubén Amorín	(Guatemala) Municipal
1975	(Uruguay) Dagoberto Moll	(Mexico) Atlético Español
1976	(El Salvador) Conrado Miranda	(El Salvador) Águila
1977	(Mexico) Raúl Cárdenas	(Mexico) América
1978	(Uruguay) Rubén Amorín (Mexico) Gustavo Peña (Trinidad and Tobago) George Joseph	(Guatemala) Comunicaciones (Mexico) Leones Negros (Trinidad and Tobago) Defence Force
1979	(El Salvador) José Eugenio Castro	(El Salvador) FAS
1980	(Socialist Federal Republic of Yugoslavia) Bora Milutinović	(Mexico) Pumas UNAM
1981	(Suriname) Humbert Boerleider	(Suriname) Transvaal
1982	(Socialist Federal Republic of Yugoslavia) Bora Milutinović	(Mexico) Pumas UNAM
1983	(Mexico) Ignacio Trelles	(Mexico) Atlante
1984	(Haiti) Charles Vorbe	(Haiti) Violette
1985	(Trinidad and Tobago) Kenny Joseph	(Trinidad and Tobago) Defence Force
1986	(Czech Republic) Josef Bouska	(Costa Rica) Alajuelense
1987	(Argentina) Cayetano Rodríguez	(Mexico) América
1988	(Uruguay) Estanislao Malinowski	(Honduras) Olimpia
1989	(Mexico) Miguel Mejía Barón	(Mexico) Pumas UNAM
1990	(Uruguay) Carlos Miloc	(Mexico) América
1991	(Mexico) Manuel Lapuente	(Mexico) Puebla
1992	(Argentina) Miguel Ángel Lopez	(Mexico) América
1993	(Costa Rica) Carlos Watson	(Costa Rica) Saprissa
1994	(Honduras) Flavio Ortega	(Costa Rica) Cartaginés
1995	(Colombia) Luis Augusto García	(Costa Rica) Saprissa
1996	(Mexico) Luis Fernando Tena	(Mexico) Cruz Azul
1997	(Mexico) Luis Fernando Tena	(Mexico) Cruz Azul
1998	(United States) Bruce Arena	(United States) D.C. United
1999	(Mexico) Raúl Arias	(Mexico) Necaxa
2000	(Germany) Sigi Schmid	(United States) LA Galaxy
2002	(Mexico) Alfredo Tena	(Mexico) Pachuca
2003	(Brazil) Ricardo Ferretti	(Mexico) Toluca
2004	(Costa Rica) Javier Delgado	(Costa Rica) Alajuelense
2005	(Costa Rica) Hernán Medford	(Costa Rica) Saprissa
2006	(Mexico) Manuel Lapuente	(Mexico) América
2007	(Mexico) Enrique Meza	(Mexico) Pachuca
2008	(Mexico) Enrique Meza	(Mexico) Pachuca
2008–09	(Mexico) José Guadalupe Cruz	(Mexico) Atlante
2009–10	(Argentina) Guillermo Rivarola	(Mexico) Pachuca
2010–11	(Mexico) Víctor Manuel Vucetich	(Mexico) Monterrey
2011–12	(Mexico) Víctor Manuel Vucetich	(Mexico) Monterrey
2012–13	(Mexico) Víctor Manuel Vucetich	(Mexico) Monterrey
2013–14	(Mexico) Luis Fernando Tena	(Mexico) Cruz Azul
2014–15	(Uruguay) Gustavo Matosas	(Mexico) América
2015–16	(Mexico) Ignacio Ambríz	(Mexico) América
2016–17	(Uruguay) Diego Alonso	(Mexico) Pachuca
2018	(Argentina) Matías Almeyda	(Mexico) Guadalajara
2019	(Uruguay) Diego Alonso	(Mexico) Monterrey
2020	(Brazil) Ricardo Ferretti	(Mexico) Tigres UANL
2021	(Mexico) Javier Aguirre	(Mexico) Monterrey
2022	(United States) Brian Schmetzer	(United States) Seattle Sounders FC
2023	(Argentina) Nicolás Larcamón	(Mexico) León
2024	(Uruguay) Guillermo Almada	(Mexico) Pachuca
2025	(Uruguay) Vicente Sánchez	(Mexico) Cruz Azul
2026	(Argentina) Antonio Mohamed	(Mexico) Toluca

=== Managers with multiple titles ===
Rank	Manager	Wins	Years won	Club(s)
1	(Mexico) Raúl Cárdenas	4	1969, 1970, 1971, 1977	(Mexico) Cruz Azul (3) (Mexico) América
2	(Mexico) Víctor Manuel Vucetich	3	2010–11, 2011–12, 2012–13	(Mexico) Monterrey
2	(Mexico) **Luis Fernando Tena**	3	1996, 1997, 2013–14	(Mexico) Cruz Azul
4	(Uruguay) Rubén Amorín	2	1974, 1978	(Guatemala) Municipal (Guatemala) Comunicaciones
4	(Suriname) Humbert Boerleider	2	1973, 1981	(Suriname) Transvaal
4	(Socialist Federal Republic of Yugoslavia) Bora Milutinović	2	1980, 1982	(Mexico) Pumas UNAM
4	(Mexico) Ignacio Trelles	2	1968, 1983	(Mexico) Toluca (Mexico) Atlante
4	(Mexico) Manuel Lapuente	2	1991, 2006	(Mexico) Puebla (Mexico) América
4	(Mexico) Enrique Meza	2	2007, 2008	(Mexico) Pachuca
4	(Uruguay) **Diego Alonso**	2	2016–17, 2019	(Mexico) Pachuca (Mexico) Monterrey
4	(Brazil) **Ricardo Ferretti**	2	2003, 2020	(Mexico) Toluca (Mexico) Tigres UANL

**Bold**	=	Still active as manager

=== By nationality ===
This table lists the total number of titles won by managers of each country. Accurate as of the 2026 final.

Nationality	Wins
Mexico	24
Uruguay	10
Argentina	6
Costa Rica	3
El Salvador	2
Suriname	2
Yugoslavia	2
Haiti	2
Trinidad and Tobago	2
Colombia	2
Brazil	2
United States	2
Chile	1
Czech Republic	1
Honduras	1
Germany	1
