= List of S.V. Robinhood seasons =

Sport Vereniging Robinhood is a Surinamese football club based in Paramaribo that competes in the Surinamese Hoofdklasse, the highest level of football in Suriname. Founded on 6 February 1945, Robinhood has built a reputation of being one of the strongest Surinamse football clubs in history and has won the most league and domestic titles in Surinamese football

Statistically, Robinhood is the most successful club in Surinamese football, having won a record 23 league titles, and a record of five Beker van Surinames and President's Cups apiece. The club was the first Surinamese club to make the final of a North American tournament, reaching the 1972 CONCACAF Champions' Cup final. Though making five North American club championship finals in their history, Robinhood has never won a continental title.

A majority of the club's success was during the 1970s and 1980s at the helm of longtime manager, Ronald Kolf, who led the club to the 15 of the 31 honors received. Following Kolf's departure in 2003, many cite a regression in Robinhood's form, as the club has failed to win any major trophy since 2005, when the club earned the double with the Hoofdklasse and Beker van Suriname titles.

Below is a list of seasons played by Robinhood and their performance in all domestic cup, league and continental competitions.

== Key ==
Champions	Runners-up	Third place	Wooden Spoon

Key to regular season record

- Pld. = Played
- W = Won
- D = Tied
- L = Lost
- GF = Goals for
- GA = Goals against
- Pts = Points
- Pos = Final league position

Key to competitions

- Hoofdklasse = Suriname first division
- Eerste Klasse = Suriname second division
- CONCACAF = The CONCACAF Champions' Cup or CONCACAF Champions League
- CFU = The CFU Club Championship

Key to domestic cup rounds (Note: This pertains to the Beker van Suriname and the President's Cup)

- R1 = First Round
- R2 = Second Round
- R3 = Third Round
- QF = Quarterfinals
- SF = Semifinals

Key to CFU/CONCACAF

- QR1 = First Qualifying Round
- QR2 = Second Qualifying Round
- QR3 = Third Qualifying Round
- R4 = Fourth Round
- R3 = Third Round
- QF = Quarterfinals
- SF = Semifinals

== Seasons ==
Season	League										Beker van Suriname	President's Cup	CFU Club Championship (Note: Prior to 2000, the Caribbean champions was determined by the champions of the Caribbean region in the CONCACAF Champions' Cup)	CFU Club Shield	CONCACAF Champions League (Note: Prior to 2008, the tournament was known as the CONCACAF Champions' Cup)	CONCACAF League	Top goalscorer(s)	
Season	League	Div.	Pld.	W	D	L	GF	GA	Pts	Pos	Beker van Suriname	President's Cup	CFU Club Championship	CFU Club Shield	CONCACAF Champions League	CONCACAF League	Name	Goals
1945	Derde Klasse	4								6th		N/A	N/A	N/A	N/A	N/A		
1946	Derde Klasse	4								1st		N/A	N/A	N/A	N/A	N/A		
1947	Tweede Klasse	3								1st		N/A	N/A	N/A	N/A	N/A		
1948	Eerste Klasse	2								1st		N/A	N/A	N/A	N/A	N/A		
1949	Hoofdklasse	1								2nd		N/A	N/A	N/A	N/A	N/A		
1950	Hoofdklasse	1								3rd		N/A	N/A	N/A	N/A	N/A		
1951	Hoofdklasse	1								2nd		N/A	N/A	N/A	N/A	N/A		
1952	Hoofdklasse	1								2nd		N/A	N/A	N/A	N/A	N/A		
1953	Hoofdklasse	1								1st		N/A	N/A	N/A	N/A	N/A		
1954	Hoofdklasse	1								1st		N/A	N/A	N/A	N/A	N/A		
1955	Hoofdklasse	1								1st		N/A	N/A	N/A	N/A	N/A		
1956	Hoofdklasse	1								1st		N/A	N/A	N/A	N/A	N/A		
1957–58	Hoofdklasse	1								2nd		N/A	N/A	N/A	N/A	N/A		
1958–59	Hoofdklasse	1								1st		N/A	N/A	N/A	N/A	N/A		
1960	Hoofdklasse		Competition abandoned									N/A	N/A	N/A	—	N/A		
1961	Hoofdklasse	1								3rd		N/A	N/A	N/A	—	N/A		
1962	Hoofdklasse	1								2nd		N/A	—	N/A	—	N/A		
1963–64	Hoofdklasse	1								2nd		N/A	—	N/A	—	N/A		
1964	Hoofdklasse	1								1st		N/A	—	N/A	—	N/A		
1965–66	Hoofdklasse	1								3rd		N/A	Withdrew	N/A	—	N/A		
1966	Hoofdklasse	1								2nd		N/A	—	N/A	—	N/A		
1967	Hoofdklasse	1								2nd		N/A	—	N/A	—	N/A		
1968	Hoofdklasse	1								4th		N/A	—	N/A	—	N/A		
1969	Hoofdklasse	1										N/A	—	N/A	—	N/A		
1970	Hoofdklasse	1										N/A	—	N/A	—	N/A		
1971	Hoofdklasse	1										N/A	—	N/A	—	N/A		
1972	Hoofdklasse	1	No competition held									N/A	Champions	N/A	Runners-up	N/A		
1973	Hoofdklasse	1										N/A	—	N/A	—	N/A		
1974	Hoofdklasse	1										N/A	Quarterfinals	N/A	First round	N/A		
1975–76	Hoofdklasse	1								1st		N/A	—	N/A	—	N/A		
1976	Hoofdklasse	1								1st		N/A	Champions	N/A	Runners-up	N/A		
1977	Hoofdklasse	1										N/A	Champions	N/A	Runners-up	N/A		
1978	Hoofdklasse	1								2nd		N/A	—	N/A	—	N/A		
1979	Hoofdklasse	1								1st		N/A	Runners-up	N/A	Quarterfinals	N/A		
1980	Hoofdklasse	1								1st		N/A	Champions	N/A	Third place	N/A		
1981	Hoofdklasse	1								1st		N/A	—	N/A	—	N/A		
1982	Hoofdklasse	1								3rd		N/A	Champions	N/A	Runners-up	N/A		
1983	Hoofdklasse	1								1st		N/A	Champions	N/A	Runners-up	N/A		
1984–85	Hoofdklasse	1								1st		N/A	Withdrew	N/A	Withdrew	N/A		
1985–86	Hoofdklasse	1								1st		N/A	Withdrew	N/A	Withdrew	N/A		
1986	Hoofdklasse	1								1st		N/A	Semifinals	N/A	Second round	N/A		
1987	Hoofdklasse	1								1st		N/A	Withdrew	N/A	Withdrew	N/A		
1988	Hoofdklasse	1								1st		N/A	Runners-up	N/A	Semifinals	N/A		
1989	Hoofdklasse	1								1st		N/A	Withdrew	N/A	Withdrew	N/A		
1990–91	Hoofdklasse	1								2nd		N/A	Semifinals	N/A	First round	N/A		
1991–92	Hoofdklasse	1								2nd		N/A	—	N/A	—	N/A		
1991–92	Hoofdklasse	1								2nd		N/A	Champions	N/A	Semifinals	N/A		
1992–93	Hoofdklasse	1								2nd		N/A		N/A	—	N/A		
1993–94	Hoofdklasse	1								1st		Champions	Runners-up	N/A	—	N/A		
1994–95	Hoofdklasse	1								1st		Champions		N/A	—	N/A		
1995–96	Hoofdklasse	1								4th		Champions		N/A	—	N/A		
1997	Hoofdklasse	1	27	19	3	5	42	17	60	2nd	Champions	Runners-up		N/A	—	N/A		
1998–99	Hoofdklasse	1	26	17	2	8	59	35	53	2nd	Champions	Champions		N/A	—	N/A		
1999–00	Hoofdklasse	1	26	13	8	5	59	31	47	5th	Not held	Not held		N/A	—	N/A		
2000–01	Hoofdklasse	1	No competition held								Champions	Champions	Group stage	N/A	—	N/A		
2001–02	Hoofdklasse	1	26	15	1	10	47	27	46	4th	QF	—	—	N/A	—	N/A		
2002–03	Hoofdklasse	1	26	16	2	6	58	35	50	2nd	Runners-up	—	—	N/A	—	N/A		
2003–04	Hoofdklasse	1	26	13	2	9	50	39	41	5th	R3	Runners-up	—	N/A	—	N/A		
2004–05	Hoofdklasse	1	26	19	5	2	71	28	62	1st	Runners-up	Runners-up	Runners-up	N/A	—	N/A		
2005–06	Hoofdklasse	1	26	16	8	2	78	35	56	2nd	Champions	Runners-up	—	N/A	—	N/A		
2006–07	Hoofdklasse	1	24	12	7	5	55	38	43	4th	Champions	Runners-up	Withdrew	N/A	—	N/A		
2007–08	Hoofdklasse	1	22	11	5	6	43	39	38	2nd	R3	—	—	N/A	—	N/A		
2008–09	Hoofkdlasse	1	20	8	3	9	32	43	27	7th	R3	—	—	N/A	—	N/A		
2009–10	Hoofkdlasse	1	18	7	5	6	29	26	25	4th	R2	—	—	N/A	—	N/A	Clifford Alleyne	5
2010–11	Hoofkdlasse	1	18	5	3	10	32	44	18	8th		—	—	N/A	—	N/A	Rendwig Kinsaini	15
2011–12	Hoofkdlasse	1	27	19	4	4	75	29	61	1st		—	—	N/A	—	N/A		
2012–13	Hoofkdlasse	1	18	4	3	11	16	31	15	9th		Runners-up	Withdrew	N/A	—	N/A		
2013–14	Hoofkdlasse	1	18	0	6	12	20	53	6	10th		—	—	N/A	—	N/A		
2014–15	Eerste Klasse	2	22	13	4	5	45	29	43	2nd		—	—	N/A	—	N/A		
2015–16	Hoofdklasse	1	18	6	3	9	27	31	21	7th		—	—	N/A	—	N/A		
2016–17	Topklasse	1	22	12	7	3	59	29	43	4th	R2	Champions	—	N/A	—	—		
2017–18	Toplkasse	1	24	17	6	1	74	27	57	1st	Champions	—	—	—	—	—		
2018–19	Toplkasse	1	29	22	7	0	89	22	73	1st		Champions	—	Champions	—	—		
2019–20	Toplkasse	1														First round		
