= List of Charlotte FC seasons =

Since its inaugural 2022 season, the American soccer club Charlotte FC has competed in Major League Soccer.

== Key ==
Key to competitions

- Major League Soccer (MLS) – The top-flight of soccer in the United States, established in 1996.
- U.S. Open Cup (USOC) – The premier knockout cup competition in U.S. soccer, first contested in 1914.
- CONCACAF Champions League (CCL) – The premier competition in North American soccer since 1962. It went by the name of Champions' Cup until 2008.

Key to colors and symbols

1st or W	Winners
2nd or RU	Runners-up
3rd	Third place
Last	Wooden Spoon
♦	MLS Golden Boot
	Highest average attendance
Italics	Ongoing competition

Key to league record

- Season = The year and article of the season
- Div = Division/level on pyramid
- League = League name
- Pld = Games played
- W = Games won
- L = Games lost
- D = Games drawn
- GF = Goals for
- GA = Goals against
- GD = Goal difference
- Pts = Points
- PPG = Points per game
- Conf. = Conference position
- Overall = League position

Key to cup record

- DNE = Did not enter
- DNQ = Did not qualify
- NH = Competition not held or canceled
- QR = Qualifying round
- PR = Preliminary round
- GS = Group stage
- R1 = First round
- R2 = Second round
- R3 = Third round
- R4 = Fourth round
- R5 = Fifth round
- Ro16 = Round of 16
- QF = Quarterfinals
- SF = Semifinals
- F = Final
- RU = Runners-up
- W = Winners

== Seasons ==
Season	League									Position		Playoffs	USOC	Continental		Average attendance (Note: Average attendance only includes statistics from regular season matches.)	Top goalscorer(s) (Note: Top goalscorer(s) includes all goals scored in the regular season, MLS Cup Playoffs, U.S. Open Cup, MLS is Back Tournament, CONCACAF Champions League, FIFA Club World Cup, and other competitive continental matches.)	
Season	Pld	W	L	D	GF	GA	GD	Pts	PPG	Conf.	Overall	Playoffs	USOC	CCL	LC	Average attendance	Name(s)	Goals
2022	34	13	18	3	44	52	-8	42	1.24	9th	19th	DNQ	Ro16	DNQ	NH	35,260	(Poland) Karol Świderski	10
2023	34	10	11	13	45	52	-7	43	1.26	9th	19th	WC	Ro16	DNQ	QF	36,337	(Poland) Karol Świderski	15
2024	34	14	11	9	46	37	+9	51	1.50	5th	11th	R1	DNE	DNQ	GS	33,383	(United States) Patrick Agyemang	11
2025	34	19	13	2	55	46	+9	59	1.74	4th	7th	R1	Ro16	DNQ	GS	30,664	(Israel) Idan Toklomati	11
Total	136	56	53	27	135	141	+3	195	1.43	—	—	—	—	—	—	—	(Poland) Karol Świderski	27
