= Jules Gersie =

Surinamese football manager

Personal information
- Full name: Jules Gersie
- Date of birth: 13 October 1917
- Place of birth: Paramaribo, Surinam
- Date of death: 23 September 2005 (aged 87)
- Place of death: Paramaribo, Suriname

Managerial career
- Years: Team
- 1952–1957: Robinhood
- ‡ National team caps and goals as of (12:36, 21 February 2016 (UTC))

Jules Gersie (13 October 1917 – 23 September 2005) was a Surinamese football manager, who managed S.V. Robinhood in the Surinamese Hoofdklasse from 1952 to 1957.

== Career ==
Born 13 October 1917 Paramaribo, Surinam, Gersie managed S.V. Robinhood in the Hoofdklasse starting in 1952, finishing as runner-up to S.V. Transvaal after the clubs' first season at the top flight. The following season saw Robinhood join Transvaal as tenants of the newly built National Stadium, where Gersie won his first national championship with Robinhood. He went on to win three more titles before ceding the managerial position to Humphrey Mac Nac.

== Honours ==
=== Manager ===
S.V. Robinhood

- Hoofdklasse (4): 1953, 1954, 1955, 1956
