= 1996 CONCACAF Cup Winners Cup =

- Dates: 1996

Final positions
- Champions: Abandoned

The 1996 CONCACAF Cup Winners Cup was the fifth edition of this defunct tournament contended between 1991 and 1998.

== Preliminary round ==
=== Northern Zone ===
Richmond Kickers qualified for interzonal playoff.

=== Caribbean Zone ===
==== Round 1 ====
November 17, 1995

(Trinidad and Tobago) United Petrotrin	4-1	(Suriname) Robinhood

December 1, 1995

(Suriname) Robinhood	0-2	(Trinidad and Tobago) United Petrotrin

United Petrotrin qualified for Next Round

==== Round 2 ====
December 8, 1995

(Trinidad and Tobago) United Petrotrin	0-1	(Guadeloupe) Siroco (Les Abymes)

December 18, 1995

(Guadeloupe) Siroco (Les Abymes)	1-0	(Trinidad and Tobago) United Petrotrin

Siroco qualified for interzonal playoff

=== Central Zone ===
==== Round 1 ====
1996

(Belize) Juventus	w/o	(Nicaragua) FC San Marcos
	FC San Marcos withdrew

==== Round 2 ====
May 31, 1996

(Panama) Árabe Unido	0-1	(Honduras) Olimpia

Estadio Armando Dely Valdés, Colón
June 2, 1996

(Honduras) Olimpia	2-0	(Panama) Árabe Unido

Estadio Armando Dely Valdés, Colón

C.D. Olimpia qualified for Next Round

May 27, 1996

(Belize) Juventus	3-4	(Guatemala) Municipal

Estadio Armando Dely Valdés, Colón
June 16, 1996

(Guatemala) Municipal	1-0	(Belize) Juventus

Estadio Armando Dely Valdés, Colón

C.S.D. Municipal qualified for Next Round

== Interzonal Playoff ==
(United States) Richmond Kickers	Not Played	(Guadeloupe) Siroco (Les Abymes)

== Final Round ==
Tournament was abandoned.
