= Svatopluk Bouška =

Czech footballer and manager

Personal information
- Date of birth: 29 April 1947 (age 79)
- Position: Midfielder

Senior career*
Years	Team	Apps	(Gls)
1963–1975	Sparta Prague		
1976–1979	Bohemians Prague		

Managerial career
- 1994: Dukla Prague
- 1995: Bohemians Prague
- * Club domestic league appearances and goals

Svatopluk Bouška (born 29 April 1947) is a Czech former football player and manager.

== Life and career ==
He had 164 appearances in the Czechoslovak First League and scored four goals. He represented his country at youth level. Moreover, Bouška became the third manager of Dukla Prague in the 1993–94 season, in which the club finished last. He managed Bohemians Prague in the 1994–95 season. His older brother, Josef Bouška, also played over 100 times in the Czechoslovak First League.
