= Josef Bouška =

Czech footballer (born 1945)

Jozef Bouška
Personal information
- Date of birth: 25 August 1945 (age 81)
- Place of birth: Trnava, Czechoslovakia
- Position: Midfielder

Senior career*
Years	Team	Apps	(Gls)
1963–1964	Sparta Praha	2	(0)
1964–1965	VTJ Tachov		
1965–1966	Sparta Praha	8	(1)
1966–1967	TJ Spartak Brno ZJŠ	24	(6)
1967–1971	Sparta Praha	30	(9)
1971–1972	Spartak BS Vlašim		
1972–1975	Slavia Praha	47	(3)

International career
1968	Czechoslovakia Olympic	5	(0)

Managerial career
- 1981: Slavia Praha
- 1983: FC Zbrojovka Brno
- 1986–1987: Alajuelense
- 1988–1991: Saprissa
- 1992: C.S. Herediano
- 1997: Limón F.C.
- * Club domestic league appearances and goals

Jozef Bouška (born 25 August 1945) is a former Czech footballer and trainer. He competed in the men's tournament at the 1968 Summer Olympics. His brother is the former football player and manager Svatopluk Bouška.

== Career ==
Bouška played for Sparta Praha, TJ Spartak Brno ZJŠ, and Slavia Praha. He played for Czechoslovakia during the 1968 Summer Olympics in Mexico City. He played 111 games in the Czechoslovak league and scored 19 goals. He participated in 5 European Cup matches, once in the European Cup Winners' Cup (1974/75 with Slavia Prague) and four times in the Fairs Cup (1966/67: 2-0 with Spartak ZJŠ Brno, 1969/70: 2-0 for Sparta Prague).

In 1980, he worked at Slavia Prague as assistant to Bohumil Musil, and a year later as head coach. He also trained at Zbrojovce Brno (in the spring of 1983 as an assistant coach in the 1st league, in the fall of the same year as a coach in the 2nd league). In the mid-1980s, he served as a coach in Costa Rica, first to Liga Deportiva Alajuelense, who under his leadership won the 1986 CONCACAF Champions' Cup, and later Deportivo Saprissa, who won the national championship in 1988 and 1989. In 1992 he coached Club Sport Herediano, followed by Limón in 1997.
