= Rubén Amorín =

Uruguayan footballer (1927–2014)

Rubén Darío Amorín Mattos (6 November 1927 – 24 December 2014) was a Uruguayan football player who played as a forward and coach.

== Playing career ==
Amorín was born in Rocha. He arrived in 1952 in Guatemala to play for Guatemala FC.

== Coaching career ==
Amorín spent the majority of his coaching career in Guatemala, where he won a record eight national titles with three clubs from 1964 to 1992, He guided Municipal and Comunicaciones to the CONCACAF Champions Cup in 1974 and 1978.

He also recorded five tenures as coach of the Guatemala national team, winning the 1967 NORCECA Championship (now the CONCACAF Gold Cup) which is the highest international honor for that national team to date. He retired in 1994.

Due to his success at both the club and international level, Amorín is considered the greatest coach in the history of Guatemalan football by the local press and football personalities.

== Death ==
On 24 December 2014, he died of Alzheimer's disease at the age of 87.
