= 1986 CONCACAF Champions' Cup =

22nd edition of premier club football tournament organized by CONCACAF

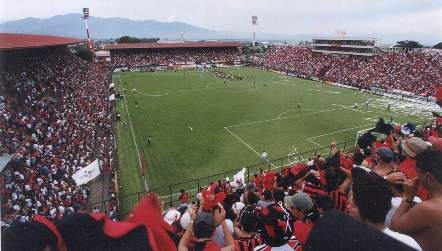
- The Estadio Alejandro Morera Soto in Alajuela hosted the final
- Dates: 22 March 1986 – 11 February 1987

Final positions
- Champions: (Costa Rica) Alajuelense
- Runners-up: (Suriname) Transvaal

The 1986 CONCACAF Champions' Cup was the 22nd edition of the annual international club football competition held in the CONCACAF region (North America, Central America and the Caribbean), the CONCACAF Champions' Cup. It determined that year's club champion of association football in the CONCACAF region and was played from 22 March 1986 till 11 February 1987.

The teams were split in 2 zones, North/Central America and Caribbean, (as North and Central America sections combined to qualify one team for the final), each one qualifying two teams to the final tournament. All the matches in the tournament were played under the home/away match system.

The North/Central American section was split too in 3 zones, North, Central 1 and Central 2, the winner of Central 1 directly qualifying to the final tournament, while the winners of North and Central 2, had to play an Intermediate round for the second spot. The Caribbean section was split in 2 zones, North and South group, qualifying one team from each group to the final tournament.

Costa Rican team Liga Deportiva Alajuelense defeated Surinamese Transvaal 6–2 on aggregate, becoming CONCACAF champions for the first time in their history.

== North/Central American Zone ==
=== Northern Group ===
==== First round ====
| 22 March 1986 1st leg | Pembroke Hamilton Club (Bermuda) | 1–0 | (United States) Greek-American A.C. | Warwick, Bermuda, Bermuda |
| | 88' | | | Stadium: PHC Field |

| 18 May 1986 2nd leg | Greek-American A.C. (United States) | 0–1 (0–2 agg.) | (Bermuda) Pembroke Hamilton Club | San Francisco, California |
| | | | Burt 70' | Stadium: Balboa Soccer Stadium |

- Club Verdes bye to the second round
- Pembroke Hamilton Club advanced to the second round.

==== Second round ====
| 22 June 1986 1st leg | Real Verdes FC (Belize) | 2–1 | (Bermuda) Pembroke Hamilton Club |

| 28 June 1986 2nd leg | Pembroke Hamilton Club (Bermuda) | 3–0 (4–2 agg.) | (Belize) Real Verdes FC |

- Pembroke Hamilton Club advances to Intermediate round.

=== Central Group 1 ===
==== First round ====
| 4 May 1986 1st leg | Juventud Retalteca (Guatemala) | 1–1 | (Costa Rica) Alajuelense | Retalhuleu, Guatemala |
| | Venancio Zelaya 68' | | José Mario Rodríguez 18' | Stadium: Estadio Dr. Óscar Monterroso Izaguirre; Attendance: 8.500; Referee: Rafael Alberto Rodríguez |

| 18 May 1986 2nd leg | Alajuelense (Costa Rica) | 2–0 (3–1 agg.) | (Guatemala) Juventud Retalteca | Alajuela, Costa Rica |
| | Omar Arroyo 59'; Elías Arias 90' pen | | | Stadium: Estadio Alejandro Morera Soto; Attendance: 4.628; Referee: José Efraín Rivera |

| 4 May 1986 1st leg | Marathón (Honduras) | 0–1 | (El Salvador) Alianza | San Pedro Sula, Honduras |
| | | | Ramón Alberto Ramírez 84' | Stadium: Estadio Francisco Morazán |

| 18 May 1986 2nd leg | Alianza (El Salvador) | 2–3 (3–3 agg.) (4–2 p) | (Honduras) Marathón | San Salvador, El Salvador |
| | Antonio García Prieto | | | Stadium: Estadio Cuscatlán |

- Alajuelense and Alianza advance to the second round.

==== Second round ====
| 27 July 1986 1st leg | Alajuelense (Costa Rica) | 1–0 | (El Salvador) Alianza | Alajuela, Costa Rica |
| | Álvaro E. Solano 70' | | Nil | Stadium: Estadio Alejandro Morera Soto; Attendance: 3.255; Referee: Rodolfo Martínez |

| 10 August 1986 2nd leg | Alianza (El Salvador) | 1–1 (1–2 agg.) | (Costa Rica) Alajuelense | San Salvador, El Salvador |
| | Rubén Alonso 49' | | Tomás Segura 76' | Stadium: Estadio Cuscatlán; Attendance: 30.000; Referee: Jorge Enrique Meléndez |

- Alajuelense advances to the CONCACAF Semi-Finals.

=== Central Group 2 ===
==== First round ====
| 4 May 1986 1st leg | Saprissa (Costa Rica) | 0–3 | (Guatemala) Comunicaciones | San José, Costa Rica |
| | | | Eric Aremengor; Raul Chacon; Oscar Sanchez | Stadium: Estadio Ricardo Saprissa Aymá |

| 18 May 1986 2nd leg | Comunicaciones (Guatemala) | 0–2 (3–2 agg.) | (Costa Rica) Saprissa | Guatemala City, Guatemala |
| | | | | Stadium: Estadio Doroteo Guamuch Flores |

| 4 May 1986 1st leg | Atlético Marte (El Salvador) | 1–0 | (Honduras) Motagua | San Salvador, El Salvador |
| | Guillermo Lorenzana Ragazzone | | | Stadium: Estadio Nacional Flor Blanca |

| 18 May 1986 2nd leg | Motagua (Honduras) | 4–1 (4–2 agg.) | (El Salvador) Atlético Marte | Tegucigalpa, Honduras |
| | Reynaldo Colón; Ángel Obando; William Rosales (o.g.) | | Jose Alvarado | Stadium: Estadio Tiburcio Carías Andino |

- Comunicaciones and Motagua advance to the second round.

==== Second round ====
| 27 July 1986 1st leg | Comunicaciones (Guatemala) | 1–1 | (Honduras) Motagua | Guatemala City, Guatemala |
| | Girón | | Chavarría | Stadium: Estadio Mateo Flores |

| 10 August 1986 2nd leg | Motagua (Honduras) | 2–1 (3–2 agg.) | (Guatemala) Comunicaciones | Tegucigalpa, Honduras |
| | Colón; Obando | | Contreras | Stadium: Estadio Tiburcio Carías Andino |

- Motagua advances to Intermediate round.

=== Intermediate Round ===
| 31 August 1986 1st leg | Motagua (Honduras) | 3–2 | (Bermuda) Pembroke Hamilton Club | Tegucigalpa, Honduras |
| | da Silva 52' 89'; Obando 60' | | 15' Dilla; 87' Dill | Stadium: Estadio Tiburcio Carías Andino; Attendance: 12,223 |

| 6 September 1986 2nd leg | Pembroke Hamilton Club (Bermuda) | 3–0 (5–3 agg.) | (Honduras) Motagua | Hamilton, Bermuda |
| | Dilla 15' 30'; Dill 75' | | Nil | Stadium: National Stadium |

- Pembroke Hamilton Club advances to the CONCACAF Semi-Finals.

== Caribbean Zone ==
=== Caribbean Group North ===
==== First round ====
| 26 March 1986 1st leg | Olympique (Martinique) | 0–1 | (Guadeloupe) Moulien | Martinique |

| 9 April 1986 2nd leg | Moulien (Guadeloupe) | 0–0 (1–0 agg.) | (Martinique) Olympique | Le Moule, Guadeloupe |
| | | | | Stadium: Stade Jacques Pontrémy |

| 26 March 1986 1st leg | Sirocco (Trinidad and Tobago) | 1–2 | (Trinidad and Tobago) Trintoc | Trinidad and Tobago |

| 9 April 1986 2nd leg | Trintoc (Trinidad and Tobago) | 2–1 (4–2 agg.) | (Trinidad and Tobago) Sirocco | Palo Seco, Trinidad and Tobago |
| | | | | Stadium: Palo Seco Velodrome |

- Moulien and Trintoc advance to the second round.

==== Second round ====
| Team 1 | Agg. | Team 2 | 1st leg | 2nd leg |
|---|---|---|---|---|
| Trintoc (Trinidad and Tobago) | 3–2 | (Guadeloupe) Moulien | 1–1 | 2–1 |

- Trintoc advance to the third round.

| Moulien (Guadeloupe) | 1–1 | (Trinidad and Tobago) Trintoc |

| Trintoc (Trinidad and Tobago) | 2–1 (3-2 agg.) | (Guadeloupe) Moulien |

==== Third round ====
| Team 1 | Agg. | Team 2 | 1st leg | 2nd leg |
|---|---|---|---|---|
| Seba United (Jamaica) | 1–2 | (Trinidad and Tobago) Trintoc | 1–1 | 0–1 |

- Trintoc advances to the CONCACAF Semi-Finals.

| Seba United (Jamaica) | 1–1 | (Trinidad and Tobago) Trintoc |

| Trintoc (Trinidad and Tobago) | 1-0 (2-1 agg.) | (Jamaica) Seba United |

=== Caribbean Group South ===
==== First round ====
| Team 1 | Agg. | Team 2 | 1st leg | 2nd leg |
|---|---|---|---|---|
| Kouroucien (French Guiana) | 0–3 | (Suriname) Transvaal | 0–1 | 0–2 |
| Juventus (Netherlands Antilles) | 0–9 | (Suriname) Robinhood | 0–5 | 0–4 |

- UNDEBA on a bye, to the second round.
- Transvaal advances to the second round.
- Robinhood on a bye, to the third round.

| Kouroucien (French Guiana) | 0-1 | (Suriname) Transvaal |

| Transvaal (Suriname) | 2–0 (3-0 agg.) | (French Guiana) Kouroucien |

| Juventus (Netherlands Antilles) | 0-5 | (Suriname) Robinhood |

| Robinhood (Suriname) | 4-0 (0-9 agg.) | (Netherlands Antilles) Juventus |

==== Second round ====
| Team 1 | Agg. | Team 2 | 1st leg | 2nd leg |
|---|---|---|---|---|
| Transvaal (Suriname) | 6–3 | (Netherlands Antilles) UNDEBA | 5–1 | 1–2 |

- Transvaal advances to the third round.

| Transvaal (Suriname) | 5-1 | (Netherlands Antilles) UNDEBA |

| UNDEBA (Netherlands Antilles) | 2–1 (3-6 agg.) | (Suriname) Transvaal |

==== Third round ====
| Team 1 | Agg. | Team 2 | 1st leg | 2nd leg |
|---|---|---|---|---|
| Robinhood (Suriname) | 2–3 | (Suriname) Transvaal | 2–2 | 0–1 |

- Transvaal advances to the CONCACAF Semi-Finals.

| Robinhood (Suriname) | 2-2 | (Suriname) Transvaal |

| Transvaal (Suriname) | 1-0 (2-3 agg.) | (Suriname) Robinhood |

== Semi-finals ==
| Team 1 | Agg. | Team 2 | 1st leg | 2nd leg |
|---|---|---|---|---|
| Alajuelense (Costa Rica) | 4–1 | (Bermuda) Pembroke Hamilton Club | 4–0 | 0–1 |
| Trintoc (Trinidad and Tobago) | 4–4 (3-4 pen) | (Suriname) Transvaal | 2–4 | 2–0 |

- Alajuelense and Transvaal advances to the CONCACAF Final.

| 21 September 1986 | Alajuelense (Costa Rica) | 4–0 | (Bermuda) Pembroke Hamilton Club | Alajuela, Costa Rica |
| | Luis Neco Fernández 32'; Omar Arroyo 38'; Jorge Gugui Ulate 57'; Óscar Macho Ramírez 69' | | | Stadium: Estadio Alejandro Morera Soto; Attendance: 8,451; Referee: Juan Pablo Escobar |

| 27 September 1986 | Pembroke Hamilton Club (Bermuda) | 1-0 (1-4 agg.) | (Costa Rica) Alajuelense | Hamilton, Bermuda, Bermuda |
| | Samuel Swan 75' | | | Stadium: Bermuda National Stadium; Attendance: 4,000; Referee: Angelo Bratsis |

| Trintoc (Trinidad and Tobago) | 2-4 | (Suriname) Transvaal | Port of Spain, Trinidad and Tobago |
| | | | Stadium: Hasely Crawford Stadium |

| Transvaal (Suriname) | 0-2 (4-4 agg.) | (Trinidad and Tobago) Trintoc | Paramaribo, Suriname |
| | | | Stadium: André Kamperveen Stadion |

== Finals ==
=== First leg ===
1986 CONCACAF Champions' Cup Final
February 7, 1987
First leg

| Transvaal (Suriname) | 1–4 | (Costa Rica) Alajuelense |
|---|---|---|
| Godlieb 22' | | Fernández 17'; Ulate 30'; Chávez 59'; Cayasso 80' |

Estadio Morera Soto, Alajuela
Attendance: 5,200
Referee: Juan P. Escobar (Guatemala)

=== Second leg ===
February 11, 1987
20:00 UTC
Second leg

| Alajuelense (Costa Rica) | 2–1 | (Suriname) Transvaal |
|---|---|---|
| Luis Fernández 63'; Cayasso 79' | | Regilio Doest 46' |

Estadio Morera Soto, Alajuela
Attendance: 4,000
Referee: Mario E. Escobar (Guatemala)

Team details

Alajuelense
Transvaal

| GK | (Costa Rica) Alejandro González |
| DF | (Costa Rica) Miguel Vargas |
| DF | (Costa Rica) Róger Flores |
| DF | (Costa Rica) Franco Benavides |
| DF | (Costa Rica) José Chaves |
| MF | (Costa Rica) Rodolfo Mills |
| MF | (Costa Rica) Víctor Sánchez | (substituted off) 60' |
| MF | (Costa Rica) Juan Cayasso |
| MF | (Costa Rica) Omar Arroyo |
| FW | (Costa Rica) Jorge Manuel Ulate |
| FW | (Costa Rica) Melvin Araya |
Substitutions:
| DF | (Costa Rica) Luis A. Fernández | (substituted in) 60' |
Manager:
(Czech Republic) Josef Bouska

| GK | (Suriname) R. Belford |
| DF | (Suriname) I. Vyent |
| DF | (Suriname) Sieven Tol |
| DF | (Suriname) R. Van Der Kust |
| DF | (Suriname) L. Simson |
| MF | (Suriname) J. Leisberger |
| MF | (Suriname) Regilio Doest |
| FW | (Suriname) Ricardo Peneux |
| FW | (Suriname) Glenn Kemble |
| FW | (Suriname) Eric Godlieb |
| FW | (Suriname) J. Lieveld |
Manager:
(Suriname) Frank Righters

- Alajuelense won 4–0 on points, (6–2 on aggregate).

== Champion ==
CONCACAF Champions' Cup
1986 Champions
(Costa Rica)
Alajuelense
First title
