= S.V. Robinhood =

Surinamese football club

Robinhood
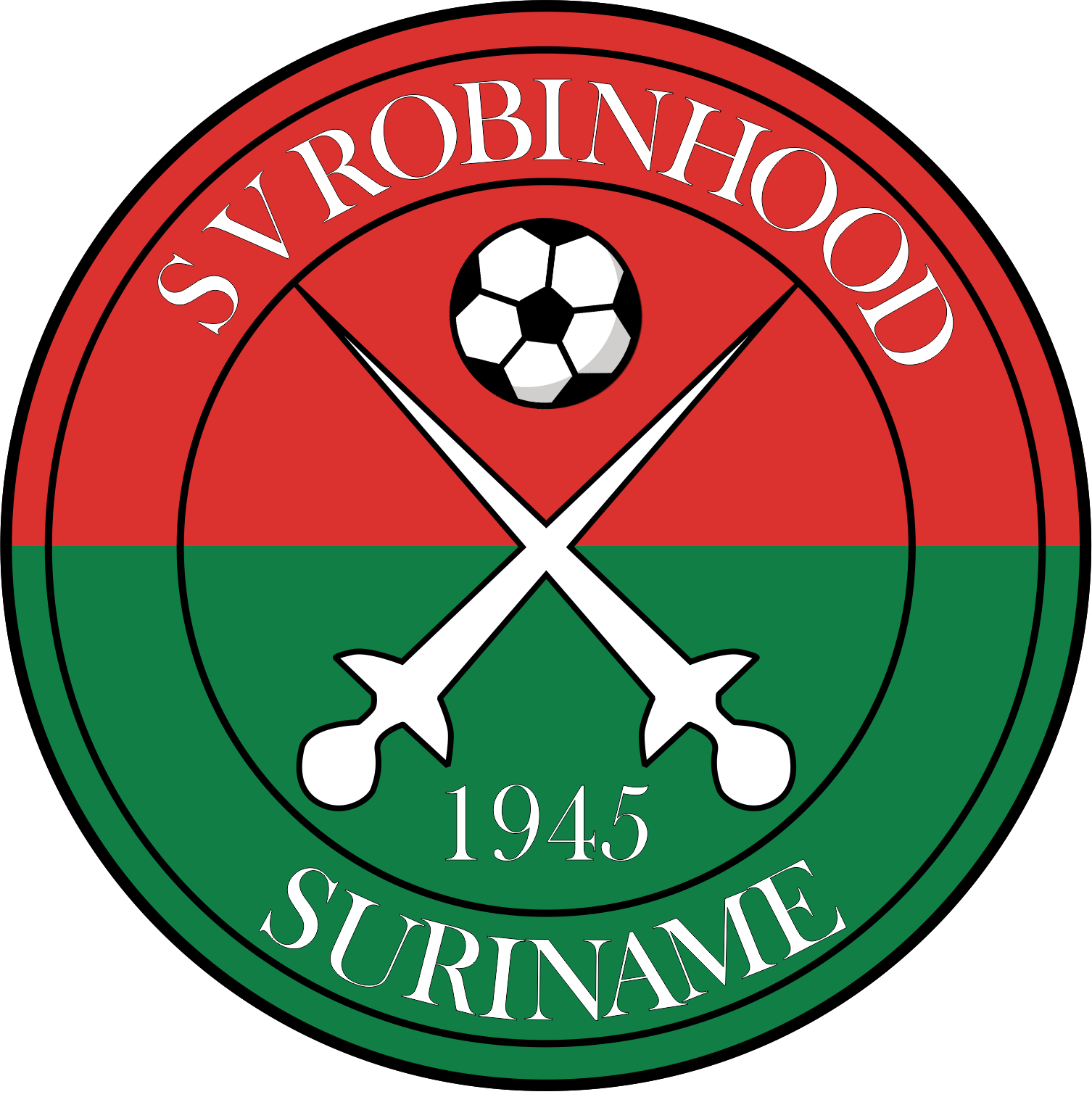
- Full name: Sport Vereniging Robinhood
- Nickname: Binhood
- Founded: 6 February 1945; 81 years ago
- Ground: Dr. Ir. Franklin Essed Stadion; Paramaribo
- Capacity: 3,500
- Chairman: Ramon Abrahams
- Manager: Roberto Godeken
- League: Suriname Major League
- 2025: SML, Regular season: 1st Playoffs: Third place
Home colours	Away colours

Sport Vereniging Robinhood is a Surinamese professional football club based in Paramaribo that competes in the highest level of football in Suriname. Founded on 6 February 1945, Robinhood is the most successful club in Surinamese football, having won a record 25 league titles, and a record of five Beker van Surinames and President's Cups apiece. The club was the first Surinamese club to make the final of a North American tournament, reaching the 1972 CONCACAF Champions' Cup final. Though making five CONCACAF club championship finals in their history, Robinhood had never won a continental title until 2023, when they won both the 2023 Caribbean Shield and the 2023 Caribbean Cup.

A majority of the club's success was during the 1970s and 1980s at the helm of longtime manager, Ronald Kolf, who led the club to the 30 of 31 honors received. Following Kolf's departure in 2003, many cite a regression in Robinhood's form, as the club has failed to win any major trophy since 2005, when the club earned the double with the Hoofdklasse and Beker van Suriname titles.

In 2014, Robinhood was relegated to the Eerste Klasse (second division). The 2014–15 campaign was the first time the club had played outside of the first division since 1948. After one season in the Eerste Klasse, Robinhood won the relegation play-offs and was promoted back to the Hoofdklasse.

Since the launch of professional football on February 22, 2024, S.V. Robinhood is competing in the professional Suriname Major League.

== History ==
=== Foundation ===
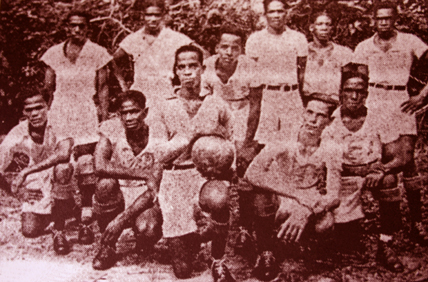
The original SV Robinhood team in 1946, when they played in the third tier Tweede Klasse.

SV Robinhood was founded by Anton Blijd on 6 February 1945. The original purpose of the club was to offer poorer boys and men living in central Paramaribo a chance to participate in a community activity. The distinct origins of the name "Robinhood" are not entirely known, but it has been reported that a man named J. Nelom proposed that the club be given the name. Nelom, who originally named the club, served as Robinhood's first chairman, although it is unknown what years he chaired the club.

Founded in 1945 as a recreational team, Robinhood entered the Tweede Klasse, or the third tier of Surinamese football in 1946, which was the Surinamese Football Association's first organized barefoot league. Originally, in spite of early success in the third flight of Surinamese football, the club was denied entry into the second tier, or Eerste Klasse because the second division required players to wear boots. The subsequent season, Robinhood won the 1947 title over SV Urania, and won a dozen pairs of boots, allowing them to participate in the Eerste Klasse. The club's humble roots, earned them much popularity in the Paramaribo area, and quickly developed a large fanbase, as well as the theme Geen strijd, geen kroon, Dutch for "No Fight, No Crown".

The club continued to ascend the flights of Surinamese football, eventually reaching the Hoofdklasse, the top Surinamese football league, in 1949. Following three consecutive runners-up in from 1950 through 1952, the club won their first Hoofdklasse title in 1953 upon beating Transvaal, 5–0. The victory, is cited to have been the budding of a bitter rivalry between Robinhood and Transvaal, as the two would jockey one another for the title of being the supreme club of Suriname.

In 1952 Robinhood became soccer champions of Suriname. The manager was Jules Gersie. During his tenure, Robinhood won four league titles. With players such as Humphrey Mijnals and Charley Marbach. Robinhood has the most titles in Suriname. In its 57th year, the club has won the tournament 22 times, of which 15 titles were won with Ronald "Ro" Kolf as the manager.

They were the first with a clubhouse (opened on May 10, 1953 while the club was run by the late doctor Doelwijt). On February 6, 1980 (44th year of existence) Robinhood opened the most modern clubhouse (of that time) at the verlengde Gemenelandsweg. The chairman was veterinarian Robbie Lieuw A Joe. Also in this ten year period Robinhood won the league title nine times out of a possible ten, dominating soccer in Suriname.

=== 1976: First trip to Europe ===
In 1976, Robinhood travelled to Europe for the first time, scheduling games in the Netherlands against Dutch Eredivisie clubs Ajax, Feyenoord, NEC, Den Haag, Elinkwijk and HFC Haarlem. Robinhood became the first club since Transvaal make the trip over the pond, finishing with two wins, two draws and two losses.

==== Tour results ====
24 July 1976	Ajax (Netherlands)	4–3	(Suriname) Robinhood	De Meer Stadion, Amsterdam
		Report

31 July 1976	Feyenoord (Netherlands)	3–1	(Suriname) Robinhood	Feijenoord Stadion, Rotterdam
		Report

8 August 1976	NEC (Netherlands)	0–1	(Suriname) Robinhood	Stadion de Goffert, Nijmegen
		Report

11 August 1976	Den Haag (Netherlands)	1–1	(Suriname) Robinhood	Zuiderpark Stadion, The Hague
		Report

13 August 1976	Elinkwijk (Netherlands)	1–1	(Suriname) Robinhood	Sportpark Elinkwijk, Utrecht
		Report

15 August 1976	HFC Haarlem (Netherlands)	1–3	(Suriname) Robinhood	Haarlem Stadion, Haarlem
		Report

=== 1970s and 1980s ===
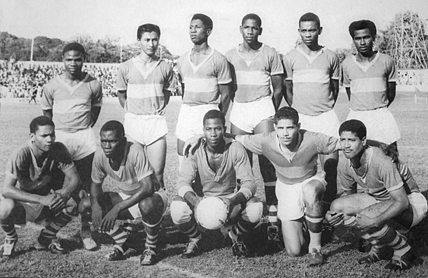
The 1976 squad that won the Hoofdklasse and Caribbean titles and finished runners up in the Champions' Cup.

To fans and the media, the 1970s and the 1980s were widely considered the most successful years for S.V. Robinhood. Between 1975 and 1989 Robinhood won the Hoofdklasse title fourteen times in sixteen seasons.

The club's success also translated to success on the subcontinental and continental stages, where Robinhood won the Caribbean Zone titles in 1976 and 1977. In the same seasons they would finish as runners-up in the now-defunct CONCACAF Champions' Cup.

During this Golden Age, the lowest the club ever finished in the Hoofdklasse was a third-place finish in 1982. During the same season, the club made their third trip to the Champions Cup, losing the 1982 final to Mexico's UNAM Pumas 3–2 on aggregate. The subsequent tournament, Robinhood made the finals upon winning the Caribbean title for a second consecutive year, defeating the Curaçao League champions SUBT, by a 4–1 aggregate scoreline. In the championship, Robinhood took on Mexico's Atlante where they lost 6–1 on aggregate. To this date, it would be the deepest in a CONCACAF tournament Robinhood would reach.

During the late 1980s, Robinhood would play a chain of friendlies against Dutch Eredivisie giants, Ajax, where they would win a match and lose a match only by a 4–3 scoreline. During the mid-to-late 1980s, the club grew its infrastructure, setting up a youth development academy.

=== 1986: Second trip to Europe ===
In 1986, Robinhood travelled to Europe once more, ten years after their previous excursion, scheduling games in the Netherlands against Dutch Eredivisie clubs Ajax, Excelsior, PEC Zwolle, HFC Haarlem, FC Volendam and the Kleurrijk XI (Dutch, "Colorful XI"), an unofficial team of Surinamese expatriates living in the Netherlands. Robinhood finished the tour with one win, two draws and three losses.

==== Tour results ====
27 July 1986	Excelsior (Netherlands)	1–0	(Suriname) Robinhood	Stadion Woudestein, Rotterdam
		Report

30 July 1986	Kleurrijk XI (Netherlands)	2–1	(Suriname) Robinhood	Olympic Stadium, Amsterdam
		Report

2 August 1986	PEC Zwolle (Netherlands)	1–2	(Suriname) Robinhood	Sportpark De Vrolijkheid, Zwolle
		Report

6 August 1986	HFC Haarlem (Netherlands)	1–1	(Suriname) Robinhood	Haarlem Stadion, Haarlem
		Report

9 August 1986	FC Volendam (Netherlands)	3–3	(Suriname) Robinhood	Kras Stadion, Volendam
		Report

13 August 1986	Ajax (Netherlands)	5–2	(Suriname) Robinhood	De Meer Stadion, Amsterdam
		Report

=== 1990s ===
Robinhood won two more league titles in this decade (1993–94 and 1994–95), they were also runners-up four times. With many changes in the team due to players leaving for Holland and other countries, Robinhood relied on youngsters coming through the system; Marcel Reidewald, Johan Vorstwijk and Ricardo Anches. This was a period of transition and a rocky one for the club's supporters. The season they finished runner-up to the army team (SNL) Robert "Muis" Lawrence set a Hoofdklasse goal-scoring record of thirty goals in a season, a record that stands to this day.

=== Ludwig van Dijk era ===
During this period, the club won its 23rd title in the 2004–05 season under coach Ricardo Winter and finished as runners-up in three other seasons. The competitive landscape changed with the emergence of teams like Inter Moengotapoe and Walking Boyz. The squad featured players such as Gordon Kinsaini, Hesdy Jap A Joe, and Marcel Reidewald. Arnold Burleson later took over as coach for a new generation of players.

=== Relegation and resurgence ===
In 2014, after almost 70 years in Suriname's elite, Robinhood dropped to the Second Division. Immediately after relegation the club finished second in the 2014–15 Eerste Klasse, gaining promotion back to the top flight for the 2015–16 SVB Hoofdklasse.

In 2018 Robinhood were able to secure their first league title in six years qualifying them for the Caribbean Club Shield. In the regional tournament Robinhood defeated Club Franciscain in the final, becoming the first Surinamese club to win a Caribbean club tournament. With this win Robinhood went on to face Real Hope for a spot in the 2019 CONCACAF League preliminary round. In extra time the score was one-all and proceeded to penalty kicks, which Robinhood won 1-3. In the CONCACAF League Robinhood faced off against Capoise. With a scoreless draw at home in the first leg, Robinhood advanced to the round of 16 on aggregate after an away goal by Alan da Costa in the second. The round of 16 saw Robinhood square off against Independiente. The club suffered a 3-2 aggregate defeat by the Panamanian side ending their hopes for continental glory.

Robinhood continued its good form by winning the 2022 and 2023 editions of the Eerste Divisie. Being crowned champions in 2022 once again qualified them for the CONCACAF Caribbean Shield. The club went on to defeat Metropolitan (5-0) in the semi-finals and Golden Lion (5-1) in the final as they lifted their second Shield in the SKNFA Technical Center. As the Shield champions Robinhood were awarded a spot in the inaugural CONCACAF Caribbean Cup. In this tournament the team finished first in their group following wins over Cibao, Dunbeholden, Atlético Pantoja and a loss against Harbour View. In the semi-finals Robinhood suffered a 1-0 defeat against Moca in the Estádio Moça Bonita. In the second leg the club was able to level on aggregate by a late goal from substitute Franklin Singodikromo. The game went to penalties after 90 minutes which Robinhood won 3-2, securing them a berth back to the top club competition of the Concacaf after 30 years. In the final Robinhood faced the Jamaican side Cavalier. The first leg was played in a full capacity Frank Essed Stadion, Paramaribo. After a cautious first half from the two teams it looked like Cavalier had the home side on the ropes in the second, but a strike from Dimitrio Andro ensured Robinhood of a 1-0 lead. The second leg of the final saw Robinhood claim the title after Franklin Singodikromo, who again came off the bench, scored a goal and served up an assist for Jamilhio Rigters to give Robinhood a 3-0 aggregate victory. The result caps an incredible Caribbean double for the Surinamese club and a spot in the 2024 CONCACAF Champions Cup.

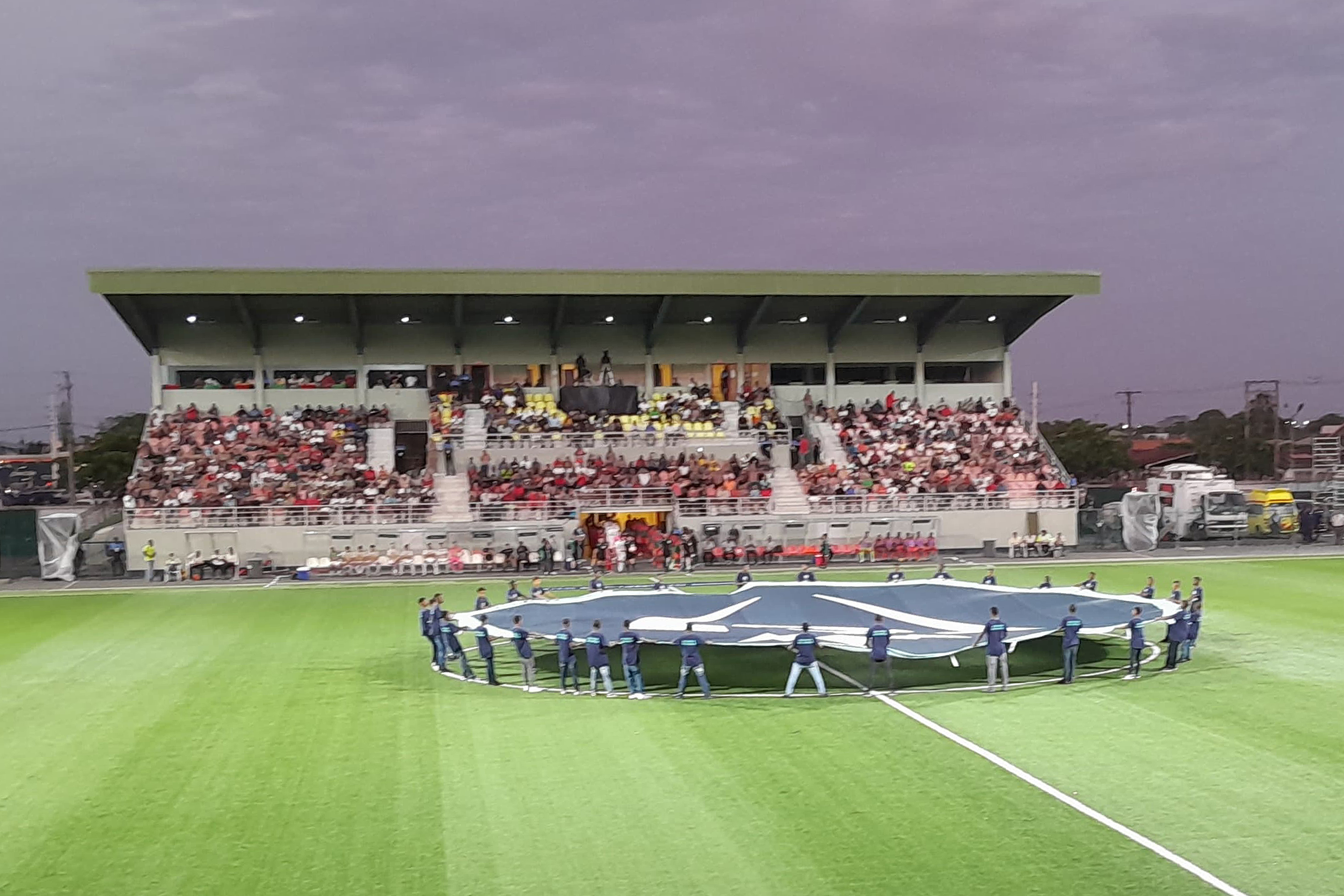
Robinhood vs Herediano in Paramaribo

== Crest and colours ==
SV Robinhood's crest is a circular badge with two swords meeting together in an upright angle. Along the border, the crest reads the club's name and foundation year. Above the two meeting swords is a soccer ball.

Throughout the club's existence, the colours have been green, red and accents of white to reflect on the colours of present-day Suriname.

== Players ==
=== First-team squad 2026 ===
Note: Flags indicate national team as defined under FIFA eligibility rules; some limited exceptions apply. Players may hold more than one non-FIFA nationality.

No.	Pos.	Nation	Player
—	GK	SUR	Jonathan Fonkel
—	GK	SUR	Cyrano Heye
—	DF	SUR	Roshiano Soeberman
—	DF	SUR	Furgell Sedoc
—	DF	SUR	Naiem Helstone
—	DF	SUR	Raviek Pryor
—	DF	SUR	Ravello Zijler
—	DF	SUR	Ackenie Muesa
—	DF	SUR	Melvino Pengel
—	FW	SUR	Dimitrio Andro
—	MF	SUR	Renske Adipi
—	MF	BRA	Carlos da Silva
—	MF	SUR	Ismael Perre
—	MF	SUR	Joel Matabadal
—	FW	SUR	Jamilhio Rigters
—	FW	SUR	Gilberto Cronie
—	FW	SUR	Jenairo Ligeon
—	FW	BRA	Mauro Nascimento Dos Santos

== Coaches ==
- (Suriname (Kingdom of the Netherlands)) Jules Gersie (1952–1957)
- (Suriname (Kingdom of the Netherlands)) Humphrey Mac Nack (1958–1968)
- (Suriname (Kingdom of the Netherlands)) Leo Schipper (1968–1969)
- (Suriname) Ronald Kolf (1969–2003)
- (Suriname) Andy Atmodimedjo (2003–2004)
- (Suriname) Ricardo Winter (2004–2005)
- (Suriname) Arno Burleson (2010–2011)
- (Suriname) Roy Vanenburg (2011–2012)
- (Suriname) Dwight Renfrum (2012–2017)
- (Suriname) Roberto Godeken (2017–present)

== Stadium ==
For as long as the stadium has existed, SV Robinhood have played their home matches in the 6,000-seater André Kamperveen Stadion. Shared with rivals Transvaal and Walking Boyz Company, Kamperveen Stadion is one of the few all grass pitches in Suriname. Prior to the construction of the Kamperveen Stadion, Robinhood played their home matches at the Flora Stadion which would later become the Dr. Ir. Franklin Essed Stadion. The Essed Stadion later became the home stadium of Robinhood once more, after the team relegated for the first time in the club's history, becoming tenants of the Essed Stadion since 2014.

== Honours ==
=== Domestic ===
- SVB Topklasse / Suriname Major League
  - Champions: (27) 1953, 1954, 1955, 1956, 1958–59, 1964, 1971, 1975, 1976, 1979, 1980, 1981, 1983, 1984, 1985, 1986, 1987, 1988, 1989, 1993–94, 1994–95, 2004–05, 2011–12, 2017–18, 2022, 2022–23, 2024.
- Beker van Suriname
  - Champions: (9) 1996–97, 1998–99, 2000–01, 2005–06, 2006–07, 2015–16, 2017–18, 2024, 2025
- Suriname President's Cup
  - Champions: (9) 1994, 1995, 1996, 1999, 2001, 2016, 2018, 2024, 2024/25

=== Continental ===
- CONCACAF Champions' Cup
  - Runners-up: (5) 1972, 1976, 1977, 1982, 1983
- CONCACAF Caribbean Cup
  - Champions: (1) 2023
- Caribbean Club Championship
  - Runners-up: (1) 2005
- Caribbean Club Shield
  - Champions: (2) 2019, 2023
  - Semi-finalists: (1) 2026

== Performance in CONCACAF competitions ==
The following is a list of results for S.V. Robinhood in international competitions. S.V. Robinhood's scores are listed first.

Year	Tournament	Round	Opponent	Home	Away	Agg.
1972	CONCACAF Champions' Cup	First Round	(Suriname) Transvaal	3–1	0–1	3–2
1972	CONCACAF Champions' Cup	Second Round	(Haiti) Don Bosco			w/o
1972	CONCACAF Champions' Cup	Final	(Honduras) Olimpia	0–1	0–0	0–1
1973	CONCACAF Champions' Cup	First Round	(Curaçao) Jong Colombia	2–3	0–1	2–4
1974	CONCACAF Champions' Cup	First Round	(Curaçao) Jong Colombia	0–1	2–2	2–3
1975	CONCACAF Champions' Cup	Round 1	(Haiti) Racing Haïtien	3–1	0–2	3–3
1975	CONCACAF Champions' Cup	Round 2	(Dominican Republic) Montecarlo			w/o
1975	CONCACAF Champions' Cup	Round 3	(Suriname) Transvaal	0–0	0–1	0–1
1976	CONCACAF Champions' Cup	First Round	(Curaçao) Jong Colombia	3–1	1–1	4–2
1976	CONCACAF Champions' Cup	Second Round	(Trinidad and Tobago) Malvern United	0–0	2–0	2–0
1976	CONCACAF Champions' Cup	Third Round	(Suriname) Voorwaarts	3–0	0–0	3–0
1976	CONCACAF Champions' Cup	Final	(El Salvador) Águila		1–5	3–8
1976	CONCACAF Champions' Cup	Final	(El Salvador) Águila		2–3	3–8
1977	CONCACAF Champions' Cup	First Round	(Guyana) YMCA	5–0	1–0	6–0
1977	CONCACAF Champions' Cup	Second Round	(Haiti) Violette	1–0	0–0	1–0
1977	CONCACAF Champions' Cup	Third Round	(Suriname) Voorwaarts	2–2	1–0	3–2
1977	CONCACAF Champions' Cup	Fourth Round	(Trinidad and Tobago) TECSA	3–1	1–1	4–2
1977	CONCACAF Champions' Cup	Final	(Mexico) América		0–1	1–2
1977	CONCACAF Champions' Cup	Final	(Mexico) América		1–1	1–2
1979	CONCACAF Champions' Cup	Third Round	(Trinidad and Tobago) Tesoro Palo Seco	2–0	1–0	3–0
1979	CONCACAF Champions' Cup	Fourth Round	(Curaçao) Jong Colombia	0–0	0–1	0–1
1980	CONCACAF Champions' Cup	First Round	(Curaçao) SUBT	4–0	1–2	5–2
1980	CONCACAF Champions' Cup	Second Round	(Trinidad and Tobago) Defence Force	2–1	2–2	4–3
1980	CONCACAF Champions' Cup	Third Round	(Suriname) Transvaal	0–0	1–0	1–0
1980	CONCACAF Champions' Cup	Final Round	(Mexico) Pumas UNAM		0–3	
1980	CONCACAF Champions' Cup	Final Round	(Honduras) Pumas UNAH		1–1	
1981	CONCACAF Champions' Cup	First Round	(Curaçao) Sithoc	5–0	0–1	5–1
1981	CONCACAF Champions' Cup	Second Round	(Suriname) Transvaal	0–0	0–0	0–0
1982	CONCACAF Champions' Cup	First Round	(Trinidad and Tobago) Palo Seco	4–1	2–1	6–2
1982	CONCACAF Champions' Cup	Second Round	(Curaçao) Jong Holland	1–1	1–0	2–1
1982	CONCACAF Champions' Cup	Third Round	(Trinidad and Tobago) Defence Force	5–2	1–1	6–3
1982	CONCACAF Champions' Cup	Final	(Mexico) Pumas UNAM		0–0	2–3
1982	CONCACAF Champions' Cup	Final	(Mexico) Pumas UNAM		2–3	2–3
1983	CONCACAF Champions' Cup	First Round	(Trinidad and Tobago) Defence Force	2–1	1–0	3–1
1983	CONCACAF Champions' Cup	Second Round	(Aruba) Dakota	5–1	0–0	5–1
1983	CONCACAF Champions' Cup	Third Round	(Curaçao) SUBT	2–0	2–1	4–1
1983	CONCACAF Champions' Cup	Final	(Mexico) Atlante	1–1	0–5	1–6
1985	CONCACAF Champions' Cup	Second Round	(French Guiana) Montjoly	0–1	3–2	3–3
1986	CONCACAF Champions' Cup	First Round	(Bonaire) Juventus	4–0	5–0	9–0
1986	CONCACAF Champions' Cup	Third Round	(Suriname) Transvaal	2–2	0–1	2–3
1988	CONCACAF Champions' Cup	Second Round	(Guadeloupe) Zenith	4–0	1–3	5–3
1988	CONCACAF Champions' Cup	Semi-finals	(Trinidad and Tobago) Defence Force	1–0		2–3
1988	CONCACAF Champions' Cup	Semi-finals	(Trinidad and Tobago) Defence Force	1–3		2–3
1990	CONCACAF Champions' Cup	First Round	(Suriname) Transvaal	0–0	1–2	1–2
1991	CONCACAF Champions' Cup	First Round	(Trinidad and Tobago) Defence Force	1–0	1–3	2–3
1992	CONCACAF Champions' Cup	First Round	(French Guiana) Le Geldar	2–0	0–1	2–1
1992	CONCACAF Champions' Cup	Second Round	(Trinidad and Tobago) Mayaro United	2–0	0–1	2–1
1992	CONCACAF Champions' Cup	Third Round	(Guadeloupe) L'Etoile	3–0	1–3	4–3
1992	CONCACAF Champions' Cup	Semi-finals	(Mexico) América		0–7	
1993	CONCACAF Champions' Cup	First Round	(French Guiana) Club Colonial	1–0	1–0	2–0
1993	CONCACAF Champions' Cup	Second Round	(Curaçao) Sithoc	3–0	1–2	4–2
1993	CONCACAF Champions' Cup	Semi-finals	(Trinidad and Tobago) Trintoc	1–0	0–0	1–0
1993	CONCACAF Champions' Cup	Final	(Martinique) Aiglon du Lamentin	3–1	0–1	3–2
1993	CONCACAF Champions' Cup	Final Tournament	(Guatemala) Municipal		0–3	
1993	CONCACAF Champions' Cup	Final Tournament	(Mexico) León		0–4	
1993	CONCACAF Champions' Cup	Final Tournament	(Costa Rica) Saprissa		1–9	
1994	CONCACAF Champions' Cup	Preliminary Round	Racing Club Aruba	7–0	1–2	8–2
1994	CONCACAF Champions' Cup	First Round	(Suriname) Leo Victor	1–0	2–4	3–4
1996	CONCACAF Cup Winners Cup	Round 1	(Trinidad and Tobago) United Petrotrin	0–2	1–4	1–6
2000	CFU Club Championship	First Round	(Curaçao) Sithoc		2–2	
2000	CFU Club Championship	First Round	(Trinidad and Tobago) Joe Public		0–5	
2000	CFU Club Championship	First Round	(Dominica) Harlem Bombers		5–2	
2005	CFU Club Championship	First Round	(Aruba) Britannia		2–0	4–1
2005	CFU Club Championship	First Round	(Aruba) Britannia		2–1	4–1
2005	CFU Club Championship	Quarter-finals	(Trinidad and Tobago) North East Stars			w/o
2005	CFU Club Championship	Semi-finals	(Saint Lucia) Northern United All Stars	3–1	4–2	7–3
2005	CFU Club Championship	Final	(Jamaica) Portmore United	2–1		2–5
2005	CFU Club Championship	Final	(Jamaica) Portmore United	0–4		2–5
2019	Caribbean Club Shield	Group Stage	(Martinique) Club Franciscain		1–3	
2019	Caribbean Club Shield	Group Stage	(Aruba) Dakota		4–1	
2019	Caribbean Club Shield	Quarter-finals	(Saint Kitts and Nevis) Village Superstars		1–1	
2019	Caribbean Club Shield	Semi-finals	(Barbados) Weymouth Wales		3–0	
2019	Caribbean Club Shield	Final	(Martinique) Club Franciscain		1–0	
2019	Caribbean Club Championship	CONCACAF League Playoff	(Haiti) Real Hope		1–1	
2019	CONCACAF League	Preliminary Round	(Haiti) Capoise	0–0	1–1	1–1
2019	CONCACAF League	Round of 16	(Panama) Independiente	1–1	1–2	2–3
2023	CONCACAF Caribbean Shield	Group Stage	(Dominican Republic) O&M		2–1	
2023	CONCACAF Caribbean Shield	Group Stage	(Saint Lucia) B1 FC		5–0	
2023	CONCACAF Caribbean Shield	Group Stage	(French Guiana) Étoile Matoury		4–2	
2023	CONCACAF Caribbean Shield	Semi-finals	(Puerto Rico) Metropolitan		5–0	
2023	CONCACAF Caribbean Shield	Final	(Martinique) Golden Lion		5–1	
2023	CONCACAF Caribbean Cup	Group Stage	(Dominican Republic) Cibao	1–0		
2023	CONCACAF Caribbean Cup	Group Stage	(Jamaica) Dunbeholden		2–0	
2023	CONCACAF Caribbean Cup	Group Stage	(Jamaica) Harbour View		2–3	
2023	CONCACAF Caribbean Cup	Group Stage	(Dominican Republic) Atlético Pantoja	3–1		
2023	CONCACAF Caribbean Cup	Semi-finals	(Dominican Republic) Moca	1–0	0–1	1–1
2023	CONCACAF Caribbean Cup	Finals	(Jamaica) Cavalier	1–0	2–0	3–0
2024	CONCACAF Champions Cup	Round of 16	(Costa Rica) Herediano	1–1	0–2	1–3
2024	CFU Club Shield	Round of 16	(French Guiana) Étoile Matoury		4–1	
2024	CFU Club Shield	Quarter-finals	(Antigua and Barbuda) Grenades		1–2	
2025	CONCACAF Caribbean Cup	Group Stage	(Jamaica) Mount Pleasant		0–1	
2025	CONCACAF Caribbean Cup	Group Stage	(Trinidad and Tobago) Central	2–2		
2025	CONCACAF Caribbean Cup	Group Stage	(Dominican Republic) O&M	1–3		
2025	CONCACAF Caribbean Cup	Group Stage	(Dominican Republic) Moca		2–0	
2026	CFU Club Shield	Round of 16	(Saint Lucia) La Clery		2–0	
2026	CFU Club Shield	Quarter-finals	(Guyana) Slingerz		4–0	
2026	CFU Club Shield	Semi-finals	(Jamaica) Mount Pleasant		1–3	

=== Record by opponent ===
Team	Pld	W	D	L	GF	GA	GD	WPCT
(El Salvador) Águila	2	0	0	2	3	8	−5	0.00
(Martinique) Aiglon du Lamentin	2	1	0	1	3	2	+1	50.00
(Mexico) América	3	0	1	2	1	9	−8	0.00
(Dominican Republic) Atlético Pantoja	1	1	0	0	3	1	+2	100.00
(Mexico) Atlante	2	0	1	1	1	6	−5	0.00
(Saint Lucia) B1 FC	1	1	0	0	5	0	+5	100.00
(Aruba) Britannia	2	2	0	0	4	1	+3	100.00
(Panama) Independiente	2	0	1	1	2	3	−1	0.00
(Haiti) Capoise	2	0	2	0	1	1	0	0.00
(Jamaica) Cavalier	2	2	0	0	3	0	+3	100.00
(Trinidad and Tobago) Central	1	0	1	0	2	2	0	0.00
(Dominican Republic) Cibao	1	1	0	0	1	0	+1	100.00
(Curaçao) Jong Colombia	8	1	3	4	8	10	−2	12.50
(French Guiana) Club Colonial	2	2	0	0	2	0	+2	100.00
(Aruba) Dakota	3	2	1	0	9	2	+7	66.67
(Trinidad and Tobago) Defence Force	10	6	2	2	17	13	+4	60.00
(Jamaica) Dunbeholden	1	1	0	0	2	0	+2	100.00
(French Guiana) Étoile Matoury	2	2	0	0	8	3	+5	100.00
(Guadeloupe) L'Etoile	2	1	0	1	4	3	+1	50.00
(Martinique) Club Franciscain	2	1	0	1	2	3	−1	50.00
(French Guiana) Le Geldar	2	1	0	1	2	1	+1	50.00
(Martinique) Golden Lion	1	1	0	0	5	1	+4	100.00
(Antigua and Barbuda) Grenades	1	0	0	1	1	2	−1	0.00
(Jamaica) Harbour View	1	0	0	1	2	3	−1	0.00
(Costa Rica) Herediano	2	0	1	1	1	3	−2	0.00
(Curaçao) Jong Holland	2	1	1	0	2	1	+1	50.00
(Dominica) Harlem Bombers	1	1	0	0	5	2	+3	100.00
(Trinidad and Tobago) Joe Public	1	0	0	1	0	5	−5	0.00
(Bonaire) Juventus	2	2	0	0	9	0	+9	100.00
(Saint Lucia) La Clery	1	1	0	0	2	0	+2	100.00
(Mexico) León	1	0	0	1	0	4	−4	0.00
(Suriname) Leo Victor	2	1	0	1	3	4	−1	50.00
(Trinidad and Tobago) Malvern United	2	1	1	0	2	0	+2	50.00
(Trinidad and Tobago) Mayaro United	2	1	0	1	2	1	+1	50.00
(Puerto Rico) Metropolitan	1	1	0	0	5	0	+5	100.00
(Dominican Republic) Moca	3	2	0	1	3	1	+2	66.67
(Jamaica) Mount Pleasant	2	0	0	2	1	4	−3	0.00
(Guatemala) Municipal	1	0	0	1	0	3	−3	0.00
(Saint Lucia) Northern United All Stars	2	2	0	0	7	3	+4	100.00
(Dominican Republic) O&M	2	1	0	1	3	4	−1	50.00
(Honduras) Olimpia	2	0	1	1	0	1	−1	0.00
(Jamaica) Portmore United	2	1	0	1	2	5	−3	50.00
Racing Club Aruba	2	1	0	1	8	2	+6	50.00
(Haiti) Racing Haïtien	2	1	0	1	3	3	0	50.00
(Haiti) Real Hope	1	0	1	0	1	1	0	0.00
(Costa Rica) Saprissa	1	0	0	1	1	9	−8	0.00
(Guyana) Slingerz	1	1	0	0	4	0	+4	100.00
(Curaçao) Sithoc	5	2	1	2	11	5	+6	40.00
(Curaçao) SUBT	4	3	0	1	9	3	+6	75.00
(Suriname) Voorwaarts	4	2	2	0	6	2	+4	50.00
(Suriname) Transvaal	12	2	6	4	7	8	−1	16.67
(Trinidad and Tobago) TECSA	2	1	1	0	4	2	+2	50.00
(Trinidad and Tobago) Tesoro Palo Seco	2	2	0	0	3	0	+3	100.00
(Honduras) Pumas UNAH	1	0	1	0	1	1	0	0.00
(Mexico) Pumas UNAM	3	0	1	2	2	6	−4	0.00
(Trinidad and Tobago) United Petrotrin	6	3	1	2	8	8	0	50.00
(French Guiana) Montjoly	2	1	0	1	3	3	0	50.00
(Haiti) Violette	2	1	1	0	1	0	+1	50.00
(Saint Kitts and Nevis) Village Superstars	1	0	1	0	1	1	0	0.00
(Barbados) Weymouth Wales	1	1	0	0	3	0	+3	100.00
(Guyana) YMCA	2	2	0	0	6	0	+6	100.00
(Guadeloupe) Zenith	1	1	0	0	5	3	+2	100.00
Total	142	65	32	45	225	172	+53	45.77

Source: Results
