= 1979 CONCACAF Champions' Cup =

15th edition of premier club football tournament organized by CONCACAF

Tournament details
- Dates: 20 May – 29 December
- Teams: 14

Final positions
- Champions: (El Salvador) FAS
- Runners-up: (Netherlands Antilles) Jong Colombia

Tournament statistics
- Matches played: 18
- Goals scored: 27 (1.5 per match)

The 1979 CONCACAF Champions' Cup was the 15th edition of the annual international club football competition held in the CONCACAF region (North America, Central America and the Caribbean), the CONCACAF Champions' Cup. It determined that year's club champion of association football in the CONCACAF region and was played from 20 May till 29 December 1979.

The teams were split in 3 zones (North American, Central American and Caribbean), each one qualifying the winner to the final tournament, where the winners of the North and Central zones played a semi-final to decide who was going to play against the Caribbean champion in the final. All the matches in the tournament were played under the home/away match system.

Salvadoran Club Deportivo FAS won the two-legged series final v Antillean team Jong Colombia (8–2 on aggregate), becoming CONCACAF champions for the first time in their history.

== North American Zone ==
| Team 1 | Agg. | Team 2 | 1st leg | 2nd leg |
|---|---|---|---|---|
| Tigres UANL (Mexico) | 3–0 | (United States) Soccer Universidad | 2–0 | 1–0 |

22 July 1979

| Tigres UANL (Mexico) | 2–0 | (United States) Soccer Universidad |

29 July 1979

| Soccer Universidad (United States) | 0–1 | (Mexico) Tigres UANL |

- Tigres UANL advance to the CONCACAF Semifinal.

== Central American Zone ==
Torneo Centroamericano de Concacaf 1979

| Team 1 | Agg. | Team 2 | 1st leg | 2nd leg |
|---|---|---|---|---|
| FAS (El Salvador) | w/o | (Guatemala) Comunicaciones | | |
| Cartaginés (Costa Rica) | w/o | (El Salvador) Alianza | | |

- Comunicaciones and Alianza withdrew.
- FAS and Cartaginés advance to the second round.

=== Second round ===
| Team 1 | Agg. | Team 2 | 1st leg | 2nd leg |
|---|---|---|---|---|
| FAS (El Salvador) | w/o | (Costa Rica) Cartaginés | | |

- FAS, won presumably by walkover and advance to the CONCACAF Semi-final.

== Caribbean Zone ==
=== Preliminary round ===
| Team 1 | Agg. | Team 2 | 1st leg | 2nd leg |
|---|---|---|---|---|
| Santos (Jamaica) | w/o | (Dominican Republic) Don Bosco FC | | |

- Santos won, presumably by walkover and advances to the First round.

=== First round ===
| Team 1 | Agg. | Team 2 | 1st leg | 2nd leg |
|---|---|---|---|---|
| Jong Holland (Netherlands Antilles) | 3–0 | (Jamaica) Arnett Gardens | 2–0 | 1–0 |
| Santos (Jamaica) | 0–4 | (Netherlands Antilles) Jong Colombia | 0–2 | 0–2 |

| Jong Holland (Netherlands Antilles) | 2–0 | (Jamaica) Arnett Gardens |

| Arnett Gardens (Jamaica) | 0-1 | (Netherlands Antilles) Jong Holland |

Jong Holland win 3-0 on aggregate

| Santos (Jamaica) | 0–2 | (Netherlands Antilles) Jong Colombia |

| Jong Colombia (Netherlands Antilles) | 2–0 | (Jamaica) Santos |

Jong Colombia win 4-0 on aggregate

- Jong Holland and Jong Colombia advance to the second round.
- (Suriname) Leo Victor qualified for second round.
- (Suriname) Robinhood qualified for third round.
- (Trinidad and Tobago) Defence Force qualified for second round.
- (Trinidad and Tobago) Tesoro Palo Seco qualified for third round

Reportedly these clubs entered the tournament; results from these matches are unknown.

=== Second round ===
| Team 1 | Agg. | Team 2 | 1st leg | 2nd leg |
|---|---|---|---|---|
| Jong Holland (Netherlands Antilles) | 0–2 | (Trinidad and Tobago) Defence Force | 0–0 | 0–2 |
| Leo Victor (Suriname) | 2–3 | (Netherlands Antilles) Jong Colombia | 2–1 | 0–2 |

| Jong Holland (Netherlands Antilles) | 0–0 | (Trinidad and Tobago) Defence Force |

| Defence Force (Trinidad and Tobago) | 2–0 | (Netherlands Antilles) Jong Holland |
|---|---|---|
| Goal |

Defence Force win 2-0 on aggregate

| Leo Victor (Suriname) | 2–1 | (Netherlands Antilles) Jong Colombia |

| Jong Colombia (Netherlands Antilles) | 2–0 | (Suriname) Leo Victor |
|---|---|---|
| Goal |

Jong Colombia win 3-2 on aggregate

- Defence Force and Jong Colombia advance to the third round.
- (Suriname) Robinhood bye to third round
- (Trinidad and Tobago) Tesoro Palo Seco bye to third round

=== Third round ===
| Team 1 | Agg. | Team 2 | 1st leg | 2nd leg |
|---|---|---|---|---|
| Defence Force (Trinidad and Tobago) | 2–3 | (Netherlands Antilles) Jong Colombia | 2–0 | 0–3 |
| SV Robinhood (Suriname) | 3–0 | (Trinidad and Tobago) Tesoro Palo Seco | 2–0 | 1–0 |

| Defence Force (Trinidad and Tobago) | 2–0 | (Netherlands Antilles) Jong Colombia |
|---|---|---|
| Goal |

| Jong Colombia (Netherlands Antilles) | 3–0 | (Trinidad and Tobago) Defence Force |
|---|---|---|
| Goal |

- Jong Colombia advances to the fourth round (Final Round In The Caribbean Section).

| Robinhood (Suriname) | 2–0 | (Trinidad and Tobago) Tesoro Palo Seco |
|---|---|---|
| Goal |

| Tesoro Palo Seco (Trinidad and Tobago) | 0–1 | (Suriname) Robinhood |
|---|---|---|
| | | Goal |

- Robin Hood wins and advances to the fourth round (Final Round In The Caribbean Section).

=== Fourth round ===
| Team 1 | Agg. | Team 2 | 1st leg | 2nd leg |
|---|---|---|---|---|
| Robinhood (Suriname) | 0–1 | (Netherlands Antilles) Jong Colombia | 0–0 | 0–1 |

| Robinhood (Suriname) | 0–0 | (Netherlands Antilles) Jong Colombia |
|---|---|---|
| Nil | | Nil |

| Jong Colombia (Netherlands Antilles) | 1–0 | (Suriname) Robinhood |
|---|---|---|
| TBD | | Nil |

- Jong Colombia is the Champions in the Caribbean Region and advances to the CONCACAF Champions Cup Final.

== CONCACAF Final Series ==
=== Semi-final ===
| Team 1 | Agg. | Team 2 | 1st leg | 2nd leg |
|---|---|---|---|---|
| Tigres UANL (Mexico) | 0–1 | (El Salvador) FAS | 0–0 | 0–1 |

==== First leg ====
1979 CONCACAF Champions' Cup
14 November 1979
First leg

| Tigres UANL (Mexico) | 0–0 | (El Salvador) FAS |

Estadio Universitario, San Nicolas de los Garza

==== Second leg ====
28 November 1979
Second leg

| FAS (El Salvador) | 1–0 | (Mexico) Tigres UANL |
|---|---|---|
| David Arnoldo Cabrera |

Estadio Cuscatlán, San Salvador

FAS won the series 1–0 on aggregate.

=== Final ===
| Team 1 | Agg. | Team 2 | 1st leg | 2nd leg |
|---|---|---|---|---|
| Jong Colombia (Netherlands Antilles) | 2–8 | (El Salvador) FAS | 1–1 | 1–7 |

==== First leg ====
1979 CONCACAF Champions' Cup Final
22 December 1979
First leg

| Jong Colombia (Netherlands Antilles) | 1–1 | (El Salvador) FAS |
|---|---|---|
| Frank Victoria 70' | (Report) | David Cabrera 72' |

Ergilio Hato Stadium, Willemstad
Attendance: 10,000

==== Second leg ====
29 December 1979
Second leg

| FAS (El Salvador) | 7–1 | (Netherlands Antilles) Jong Colombia |
|---|---|---|
| Roberto Casadei 12', 43'; Jorge González 56', 81'; David Cabrera 64', 87'; Alfredo Erazo 63' | (Report) | Edwin Bernardina 90' |

Estadio Cuscatlan, San Salvador
Attendance: 50,000
Referee: Jorge M. Ramírez (Guatemala)

FAS won the series 8–2 on aggregate.

Team details

FAS
Jong Colombia

| GK | | (El Salvador) Nicolás Chávez |
| DF | | (El Salvador) Guillermo Rodríguez |
| DF | | (El Salvador) Héctor Piccioni |
| DF | | (El Salvador) Gonzalo Henríquez |
| DF | | (El Salvador) Carlos Recinos |
| MF | | (Argentina) Amado Abraham |
| MF | | (Argentina) Manolo Álvarez |
| FW | | (El Salvador) Alfredo Erazo |
| FW | | (El Salvador) Mágico González |
| FW | | (El Salvador) David Arnoldo Cabrera |
| FW | 9 | (Argentina) Raúl Casadei (substituted off) a' |
Substitutions:
| DF | | (El Salvador) Luis Padilla | (substituted on) a' |
Manager:
(El Salvador) José E. Castro

| GK | (Netherlands Antilles) Carlos Bernardina |
| DF | (Netherlands Antilles) Wilbert Zimmerman |
| DF | (Netherlands Antilles) Elsio Constancia |
| DF | (Netherlands Antilles) Rudolph Zimmerman |
| DF | (Netherlands Antilles) Huber Martina |
| MF | (Netherlands Antilles) Alberto Humbler |
| MF | (Netherlands Antilles) Héctor Zimmerman |
| FW | (Netherlands Antilles) Julio Constancia |
| FW | (Netherlands Antilles) Guillermo Zimmerman |
| FW | (Netherlands Antilles) Edwin Bernardina |
| FW | (Netherlands Antilles) Frank Victoria |
Manager:
?

== Champion ==
CONCACAF Champions' Cup
1979 Champion
(El Salvador)
FAS
First title
