= 1982 CONCACAF Champions' Cup =

18th edition of premier club football tournament organized by CONCACAF

- Dates: 9 May – 17 November

Final positions
- Champions: (Mexico) UNAM
- Runners-up: (Suriname) Robinhood

The 1982 CONCACAF Champions' Cup was the 18th edition of the CONCACAF Champions' Cup, the premier football club competition organized by CONCACAF, the regional governing body of North America, Central America, and the Caribbean.

UNAM won the final 3–2 on aggregate for their second CONCACAF club title.

== Format ==
The teams were split in two zones, North/Central American and Caribbean, (as North and Central American sections combined to qualify one team for the final), each one qualifying the winner to the final tournament. All the matches in the tournament were played under the home/away match system.

== Bracket ==
First round
(Trinidad and Tobago) Palo Seco | 1 | 2 | 3
(Suriname) Robinhood | 2 | 4 | 6
(Suriname) Transvaal | 2 | 0 | 2
(Netherlands Antilles) Jong Holland | 4 | 3 | 7
(El Salvador) Independiente | 0 | 0 | 0
(Guatemala) Comunicaciones | 0 | 1 | 1
(Guatemala) Xelajú (w/o) | - | - | -
(Mexico) Cruz Azul | - | - | -
(Honduras) Vida (w/o) | - | - | -
(United States) Brooklyn Dodgers | - | - | -
(Mexico) UNAM (w/o) | - | - | -
(United States) New York Pancyprian-Freedoms | - | - | -

Second round
(Suriname) Robinhood | 1 | 1 | 2
(Netherlands Antilles) Jong Holland | 1 | 0 | 1
(Netherlands Antilles) SUBT | 1 | 0 | 1
(Trinidad and Tobago) Defence Force | 0 | 2 | 2
(Guatemala) Comunicaciones | 1 | 1 | 2
(Guatemala) Xelajú | 0 | 1 | 1
(Honduras) Vida | 2 | 0 | 2
(Mexico) UNAM | 2 | 5 | 7

Third round
(Suriname) Robinhood | 5 | 1 | 6
(Trinidad and Tobago) Defence Force | 2 | 1 | 3
(Guatemala) Comunicaciones | 2 | 0 | 2
(Mexico) UNAM | 2 | 3 | 5

Final
(Suriname) Robinhood | 0 | 2 | 2
(Mexico) UNAM | 0 | 3 | 3

== North/Central American Zone ==
=== First round ===
The first leg was played on 9 May, and the second leg was played on 16 May 1982.

| Team 1 | Agg. | Team 2 | 1st leg | 2nd leg |
|---|---|---|---|---|
| Xelajú (Guatemala) | w/o | (Mexico) Cruz Azul | Cancelled | Cancelled |
| UNAM (Mexico) | w/o | (United States) New York Pancyprian-Freedoms | Cancelled | Cancelled |
| Vida (Honduras) | w/o | (United States) Brooklyn Dodgers | Cancelled | Cancelled |
| Independiente (El Salvador) | 0–1 | (Guatemala) Comunicaciones | 0–0 | 0–1 |

| Xelajú (Guatemala) | Cancelled (w/o) | (Mexico) Cruz Azul |

| Cruz Azul (Mexico) | Cancelled (w/o) | (Guatemala) Xelajú |

Xelajú advanced to the second round after Cruz Azul withdrew from the competition

| UNAM (Mexico) | Cancelled (w/o) | (United States) New York Pancyprian-Freedoms |

| New York Pancyprian-Freedoms (United States) | Cancelled (w/o) | (Mexico) UNAM |

UNAM advanced to the second round after New York Pancyprian-Freedoms withdrew from the competition

| Vida (Honduras) | Cancelled (w/o) | (United States) Brooklyn Dodgers |

| Brooklyn Dodgers (United States) | Cancelled (w/o) | (Honduras) Vida |

Vida advanced to the second round after Brooklyn Dodgers withdrew from the competition

9 May 1982

| Independiente (El Salvador) | 0–0 | (Guatemala) Comunicaciones |

Estadio Jiboa, San Vicente
16 May 1982

| Comunicaciones (Guatemala) | 1–0 | (El Salvador) Independiente |

Estadio Doroteo Guamuch Flores, Guatemala City

Comunicaciones won 1–0 on aggregate.

=== Second round ===
The first legs were played on 25 April and 27 May, and the second legs were played on 28 April and July 25, 2022.

| Team 1 | Agg. | Team 2 | 1st leg | 2nd leg |
|---|---|---|---|---|
| Vida (Honduras) | 2–7 | (Mexico) UNAM | 2–2 | 0–5 |
| Comunicaciones (Guatemala) | 2–1 | (Guatemala) Xelajú | 1–0 | 1–1 |

25 April 1982

| Vida (Honduras) | 2–2 | (Mexico) UNAM |

Estadio Nilmo Edwards, La Ceiba
28 April 1982

| UNAM (Mexico) | 5–0 | (Honduras) Vida |

Estadio Olímpico Universitario, Mexico City

UNAM won 7–2 on aggregate.

27 May 1982

| Comunicaciones (Guatemala) | 1–0 | (Guatemala) Xelajú |
|---|---|---|
| Byron Perez |

Estadio Doroteo Guamuch Flores, Guatemala City
25 July 1982

| Xelajú (Guatemala) | 1–1 | (Guatemala) Comunicaciones |

Estadio del Ejército, Guatemala City

Comunicaciones won 2–1 on aggregate.

=== Third round ===
The first leg was played on 26 September, and the second leg was played on 29 September 1982.

| Team 1 | Agg. | Team 2 | 1st leg | 2nd leg |
|---|---|---|---|---|
| Comunicaciones (Guatemala) | 2–5 | (Mexico) UNAM | 2–2 | 0–3 |

26 September 1982

| Comunicaciones (Guatemala) | 2–2 | (Mexico) UNAM |

Estadio Doroteo Guamuch Flores, Guatemala City
29 September 1982

| UNAM (Mexico) | 3–0 | (Guatemala) Comunicaciones |

Estadio Olímpico Universitario, Mexico City

UNAM won 5–2 on aggregate.

== Caribbean Zone ==
=== First round ===
The first legs were played on 16 May, and the second legs were played on 30 May 1982.

| Team 1 | Agg. | Team 2 | 1st leg | 2nd leg |
|---|---|---|---|---|
| Transvaal (Suriname) | 2–7 | (Netherlands Antilles) Jong Holland | 2–4 | 0–3 |
| Palo Seco (Trinidad and Tobago) | 2–6 | (Suriname) Robinhood | 1–2 | 1–4 |

16 May 1982

| Transvaal (Suriname) | 2–4 | (Netherlands Antilles) Jong Holland |

30 May 1982

| Jong Holland (Netherlands Antilles) | 3–0 | (Suriname) Transvaal |

Jong Holland won 7–2 on aggregate.

16 May 1982

| Palo Seco (Trinidad and Tobago) | 1–2 | (Suriname) Robinhood |

30 May 1982

| Robinhood (Suriname) | 4–1 | (Trinidad and Tobago) Palo Seco |

Robinhood won 6–2 on aggregate.

=== Second round ===
The first legs were played on 6 and 13 June, and the second legs were played on 18 June and 7 July 1982.

| Team 1 | Agg. | Team 2 | 1st leg | 2nd leg |
|---|---|---|---|---|
| SUBT (Netherlands Antilles) | 1–2 | (Trinidad and Tobago) Defence Force | 1–0 | 0–2 |
| Robinhood (Suriname) | 2–1 | (Netherlands Antilles) Jong Holland | 1–1 | 1–0 |

6 June 1982

| SUBT (Netherlands Antilles) | 1–0 | (Trinidad and Tobago) Defence Force |

18 June 1982

| Defence Force (Trinidad and Tobago) | 2–0 | (Netherlands Antilles) SUBT |

Defence Force won 2–1 on aggregate.

13 June 1982

| Robinhood (Suriname) | 1–1 | (Netherlands Antilles) Jong Holland |

7 July 1982

| Jong Holland (Netherlands Antilles) | 0–1 | (Suriname) Robinhood |

Robinhood won 2–1 on aggregate.

=== Third round ===
| Team 1 | Agg. | Team 2 | 1st leg | 2nd leg |
|---|---|---|---|---|
| Robinhood (Suriname) | 6–3 | (Trinidad and Tobago) Defence Force | 5–2 | 1–1 |

2 October 1982

| Robinhood (Suriname) | 5–2 | (Trinidad and Tobago) Defence Force |

15 October 1982

| Defence Force (Trinidad and Tobago) | 1–1 | (Suriname) Robinhood |

Robinhood won 6–3 on aggregate.

== Final ==
=== Summary ===
The first leg was played on 14 November, and the second leg was played on 17 November 1982.

| Team 1 | Agg. | Team 2 | 1st leg | 2nd leg |
|---|---|---|---|---|
| Robinhood (Suriname) | 2–3 | (Mexico) UNAM | 0–0 | 2–3 |

=== Matches ===
14 November 1982

| Robinhood (Suriname) | 0–0 | (Mexico) UNAM |

Estadio Corregidora, Querétaro
17 November 1982

| UNAM (Mexico) | 3–2 | (Suriname) Robinhood |
|---|---|---|
| Ferretti 1', 41'; Flores 25' | | Klinker 27'; Rustemberg 44' (pen.) |

Estadio Olímpico Universitario, Mexico City

| UNAM | Robinhood |

UNAM won 3–2 on aggregate.
