= 1983 CONCACAF Champions' Cup =

19th edition of premier club football tournament organized by CONCACAF

- Dates: 2 March 1983 – 1 February 1984

Final positions
- Champions: (Mexico) Atlante
- Runners-up: (Suriname) Robinhood

The 1983 CONCACAF Champions' Cup was the 19th edition of the annual international club football competition held in the CONCACAF region (North America, Central America and the Caribbean), the CONCACAF Champions' Cup. It determined that year's club champion of association football in the CONCACAF region and was played from 2 March 1983 till 1 February 1984.

The teams were split in two zones, North/Central American and Caribbean, (as North and Central American sections combined to qualify one team for the final), each one qualifying the winner to the final tournament. All the matches in the tournament were played under the home/away match system.

Mexican club Atlante beat Surinamese Robinhood 6–1 on aggregate, becoming CONCACAF champion for the first time in their history.

== North/Central American Zone ==
=== First round ===
| 20 March 1983 | Atlético Marte (El Salvador) | w/o | (Costa Rica) Municipal Puntarenas | San Salvador, El Salvador |
| CST | | | | Stadium: Estadio Cuscatlán |

| | Municipal Puntarenas (Costa Rica) | w/o | (El Salvador) Atlético Marte | Puntarenas, Costa Rica |
| CST | | | | Stadium: Estadio Lito Pérez |

Municipal Puntarenas withdrew.

| 20 March 1983 | Independiente (El Salvador) | w/o | (United States) Detroit Express | San Vicente, El Salvador |
| CST | | | | Stadium: Estadio Jiboa |

| | Detroit Express (United States) | w/o | (El Salvador) Independiente | Pontiac, United States |
| EST | | | | Stadium: Pontiac Silverdome |

Detroit Express withdrew.

| 20 March 1983 | Olimpia (Honduras) | 0–1 | (Mexico) Tigres | Tegucigalpa, Honduras |
| CST | | | Luis Fernández 43' | Stadium: Estadio Tiburcio Carías Andino |

| 6 April 1983 | Tigres (Mexico) | 2–1 (3–1 agg.) | (Honduras) Olimpia | San Nicolás de los Garza, Mexico |
| CST | Enrique Alfaro 25'; Salvador Carrillo 29' | | Prudencio Norales 65' | Stadium: Estadio Universitario (UANL) |

Match abandoned in 72' when Olimpia walked off in protest to refereeing decisions; result stood.

| 10 April 1983 | Comunicaciones (Guatemala) | 2–2 | (Mexico) Atlante | Guatemala City, Guatemala |
| CST | Fernández 47'; Byron Pérez 64' | | Rubén Ayala 51'; Jose Luis González 76' | Stadium: Estadio Mateo Flores |

| 13 April 1983 | Atlante (Mexico) | 2–0 (4–2 agg.) | (Guatemala) Comunicaciones | Guatemala City, Guatemala |
| CST | Eduardo Rergis 14'; Grzegorz Lato 80' (pen.) | | | Stadium: Estadio Mateo Flores |

Both legs in Ciudad de Guatemala.

| 10 April 1983 | Motagua (Honduras) | 2–1 | (United States) NY Pancyprian-Freedoms | Tegucigalpa, Honduras |
| CST | Ángel Obando 8'; Luis Alberto Reyes 10' | | Evagoras Christofi 53' | Stadium: Estadio Tiburcio Carías Andino |

| 24 April 1983 | NY Pancyprian-Freedoms (United States) | 3–1 (4–3 agg.) | (Honduras) Motagua | Queens, United States |
| EST | | | Yubini | Stadium: Metropolitan Oval |

| 20 April 1983 | Saprissa (Costa Rica) | 2–2 | (Guatemala) Suchitepéquez | San José, Costa Rica |
| CST | | | | Stadium: Estadio Ricardo Saprissa Aymá |

| 27 April 1983 | Suchitepéquez (Guatemala) | 1–0 (3–2 agg.) | (Costa Rica) Saprissa | Mazatenango, Guatemala |
| CST | | | | Stadium: Estadio Carlos Salazar Hijo |

=== Second round ===
| Team 1 | Agg. | Team 2 | 1st leg | 2nd leg |
|---|---|---|---|---|
| New York Pancyprian-Freedoms (United States) | 3–4 | (Mexico) Atlante | 1–1 | 2–3 |
| Atlético Marte (El Salvador) | 2–3 | (El Salvador) Independiente | 2–3 | 0–0 |
| Tigres UANL (Mexico) | 1–4 | (Guatemala) Suchitepéquez | 1–1 | 0–3 |

- Atlante and Suchitepéquez advance to the third round.

| 13 June 1983 | New York Pancyprian-Freedoms (United States) | 1–1 | (Mexico) Atlante | Randalls and Wards Islands, United States |
| | Papaioannou | | Mario Hernandez | Stadium: Downing Stadium |

| 14 June 1983 | Atlante (Mexico) | 3–2 (4–3 agg.) | (United States) New York Pancyprian-Freedoms | Hempstead, United States |
| | | | | Stadium: Hofstra Stadium, United States; Attendance: 5,000 |

| 6 July 1983 | Atlético Marte (El Salvador) | 2–3 | (El Salvador) Independiente | San Vicente, El Salvador |
| | | | | Stadium: Estadio Jiboa |

| 4 August 1983 | Independiente (El Salvador) | 0–0 (3–2 agg.) | (El Salvador) Atlético Marte | San Salvador, El Salvador |
| | | | | Stadium: Estadio Cuscatlán |

- Independiente withdrew after series.

| 13 August 1983 | Tigres UANL (Mexico) | 1–1 | (Guatemala) Suchitepéquez | San Nicolás de los Garza, Mexico |
| | | | | Stadium: Estadio Universitario (UANL) |

| 28 August 1983 | Suchitepéquez (Guatemala) | 3–0 (4–1 agg.) | (Mexico) Tigres UANL | Mazatenango, Guatemala |
| | Walter Claveri; José Luis González; Adán Paniagua | | | Stadium: Estadio Carlos Salazar Hijo; Attendance: 12,000 |

=== Third round ===
| Team 1 | Agg. | Team 2 | 1st leg | 2nd leg |
|---|---|---|---|---|
| Suchitepéquez (Guatemala) | 2–8 | (Mexico) Atlante | 2–2 | 0–6 |

- Atlante advance to the CONCACAF Final Round.

| 16 November 1983 | Suchitepéquez (Guatemala) | 2–2 | (Mexico) Atlante | Mazatenango, Guatemala |
| | | | | Stadium: Estadio Carlos Salazar Hijo |

| 30 November 1983 | Atlante (Mexico) | 6–0 (8–2 agg.) | (Guatemala) Suchitepéquez | Mexico City, Mexico |
| | | | | Stadium: Estadio Ciudad de los Deportes |

== Caribbean Zone ==
=== First round ===
| Team 1 | Agg. | Team 2 | 1st leg | 2nd leg |
|---|---|---|---|---|
| SUBT (Netherlands Antilles) | 5 - 4 | (Trinidad and Tobago) Kentucky Memphis | 5 - 0 | 0 - 4 |
| Defence Force (Trinidad and Tobago) | 1 - 3 | (Suriname) Robinhood | 0 - 1 | 1 - 2 |
| Leo Victor (Suriname) | 4 - 5 | (Aruba) Dakota | 1 - 5 | 3 - 0 |

- SUBT bye to the third round.
- Robinhood and Dakota advance to the second round.

| SUBT (Netherlands Antilles) | 5-0 | (Trinidad and Tobago) Kentucky Memphis |

| Kentucky Memphis (Trinidad and Tobago) | 4-0 (4-5 agg.) | (Netherlands Antilles) SUBT |

| Defence Force (Trinidad and Tobago) | 0-1 | (Suriname) Robinhood |

| Robinhood (Suriname) | 2-1 (3-1 agg.) | (Trinidad and Tobago) Defence Force |

| July 3, 1983 | Leo Victor (Suriname) | 1–5 | (Aruba) Dakota | Paramaribo, Suriname |
| | | | Rudy Dirks; Louis Richardson |

| July 11, 1983 | Dakota (Aruba) | 0-3 (5-4 agg.) | (Suriname) Leo Victor |
| | Jimmy Lieveldt; Ruben Wijks |

=== Second round ===
| Team 1 | Agg. | Team 2 | 1st leg | 2nd leg |
|---|---|---|---|---|
| Robinhood (Suriname) | 5 - 1 | (Aruba) Dakota | 5 - 1 | 0 - 0 |

- Robinhood advances to the third round.

| Robinhood (Suriname) | 5-1 | (Aruba) Dakota |

| Dakota (Aruba) | 0-0 (1-5 agg.) | (Suriname) Robinhood |

=== Third round ===
| Team 1 | Agg. | Team 2 | 1st leg | 2nd leg |
|---|---|---|---|---|
| SUBT (Netherlands Antilles) | 1 - 4 | (Suriname) Robinhood | 1 - 2 | 0 - 2 |

- Robinhood advances to the CONCACAF Final.

| SUBT (Netherlands Antilles) | 1–2 | (Suriname) Robinhood |

| Robinhood (Suriname) | 2–0 (4-1 agg.) | (Netherlands Antilles) SUBT |

== Final ==
=== First leg ===
1983 CONCACAF Champions' Cup Final
January 22, 1984
First leg

| Robinhood (Suriname) | 1–1 | (Mexico) Atlante |
|---|---|---|
| Andre Grando 83' | Report | Gonzalo Farfán |

André Kamperveen Stadium, Paramaribo

=== Second leg ===
February 1, 1984
Second leg

| Atlante (Mexico) | 5–0 | (Suriname) Robinhood |
|---|---|---|
| Farfán 4', 63'; Castro 9', 47'; Moses 70' | Report |

Estadio Azulgrana, Mexico City

Team details

Atlante
Robinhood

- Atlante won 3–1 on points (6–1 on aggregate).

== Champion ==
CONCACAF Champions' Cup
1983 Champions
(Mexico)
Atlante
First title
