= Mr. Bronsplein =

Sports complex in Paramaribo, Suriname

- Interactive map of Mr. Bronsplein
- Former names: Lanti Djari
- Location: Paramaribo, Suriname
- Coordinates: 5°49′20.27″N 55°10′23.84″W
- Owner: City and District of Paramaribo
- Surface: Grass

Construction
- Built: 1946–1948
- Opened: 23 February 1948

Tenants
- Ajax (Hoofdklasse) (1921-1968); Arsenal (Hoofdklasse) (1921-1968)

Established in 1948, Mr. Bronsplein is a large sports complex located on the Gemenelandsweg, in Paramaribo, Suriname.

== History ==
Before World War II the field was already used for association football matches, and was known in the Sranantongo language as "Lanti Djari". In 1946 the initiative was taken to introduce organized matches and competitions to the field by Frits Juda. J. Sleur and Walther. Between 1946 and 1952 organized matches were held on the pitch, with the introduction of the Bronsplein Sport Bond organizing committee in 1952.

On 23 February 1948 the complex was officially named the Mr. Bronsplein Sportterrein, named after colonial governor Johannes Cornelis Brons who was governor of Surinam from 20 September 1945 to 5 July 1948. The board of directors of the Sport terrain at the time were P.H. Emanuels (chairman), J. Sleur (secretary), A. Holland (treasurer), L. Wijks, and F. Juda en Hooten (commissioners). Both Ajax and SV Arsenal were able to win national championship titles as tenants of the Bronsplein; Ajax in 1926–27, 1928–29, 1929–30 and SV Arsenal in 1938–39, 1939–40 seasons.

== Notable tenants ==
- Ajax
- Arsenal
- Benjamin Boys
- Elto
- Haiti
- Hercules
- Hooper
- Jong Atlas
- KMD (Klein Maar Dapper)
- MYOB (Mind Your Own Business)
- Nautico
- Read Cirkel
- Remo
- Rijper Jeugd
- Rijzende Zon
- Rosario
- Toreno
- Victoria

== Notable former players ==
Notable players who began their career on the Mr. Bronsplein

- (Suriname) Frans Berggraaf
- (Suriname) Humbert Boerleider
- (Suriname) Ronald Breinburg
- (Suriname) Paul Degenaar
- (Suriname) Stanley Duyzer
- (Suriname) August Foe A Man
- (Suriname) Iwan Fränkel
- (Suriname) Jacques Alex Hasselbaink
- (Suriname) Leo Kogeldans
- (Suriname) Ronald Kolf
- (Suriname) Stanley Krenten
- (Suriname) Michel Kruin
- (Suriname) Jules Lagadeau
- (Suriname) Ludwig Mans
- (Suriname) Charley Marbach
- (Suriname) Leo Marcet
- (Suriname) Frank Mijnals
- (Suriname) Humphrey Mijnals
- (Suriname) Ewald Oniel
- (Suriname) Frits Purperhart
- (Suriname) Herman Rijkaard
- (Suriname) Frank Rigters
- (Suriname) Edwin Schal
- (Suriname) Leo Schipper
- (Suriname) Armand Sahadewsing
- (Suriname) Wilfred Slengard
- (Suriname) Erwin Sparendam
- (Suriname) Eugene Testing
- (Suriname) Roy Vanenburg
- (Suriname) Bill Waterval

Players who began their career on the Mr. Bronsplein and played in the Eredivisie in the Netherlands

- (Suriname) Ronald Breinburg (GVAV 1963–70)
- (Suriname) Iwan Fränkel (Blauw-Wit 1962–64)
- (Suriname) Leo Kogeldans (VVV-Venlo 1957–59)
- (Suriname) Michel Kruin (USV Elinkwijk 1957–61, DOS 1961–64)
- (Suriname) Jules Lagadeau (PSV 1964–65)
- (Suriname) Charley Marbach (USV Elinkwijk 1956–61)
- (Suriname) Frank Mijnals (USV Elinkwijk 1957–60)
- (Suriname) Humphrey Mijnals^{1} (USV Elinkwijk 1962–64, DOS 1964–66)
- (Suriname) Herman Rijkaard (Blauw-Wit 1957–61)
- (Suriname) Armand Sahadewsing (DWS 1967–68)
- (Suriname) Erwin Sparendam (USV Elinkwijk 1957; 1959–61, Blauw-Wit 1957–58; 1961–64)

1. Humphrey Mijnals was also capped for the Netherlands national football team, before opting to play for Suriname instead.
