= Fränkel =

Fränkel (or Fraenkel) is a surname. Notable people with the surname include:

- Abraham Fraenkel (1891–1965), German-Israeli mathematician, known for Zermelo–Fraenkel set theory
- Albert Fraenkel (1864–1938), German physician
- Albert Fränkel (1848–1916), German physician
- Aviezri Fraenkel (born 1929), Israeli mathematician
- Baruch Fränkel-Teomim (1760–1828), rabbi, Talmudist
- David ben Naphtali Fränkel (c. 1704–1762), German rabbi
- Eduard Fraenkel (1888–1965), German-English classical scholar
- Ernst Fränkel (physician) (1844–1921), German gynaecologist
- Ernst Fraenkel (linguist) (1881–1957), German linguist
- Ernst Fraenkel (political scientist) (1898–1975), German political scientist
- Fränkel (born 2000), Canadian singer
- Gottfried S. Fraenkel (1901–1984), German-American entomologist
- Hermann Fränkel (1888–1977), German-American classicist
- Heinz Fraenkel-Conrat (1910–1999), German biochemist
- Iwan Fränkel (born 1941), Surinamese footballer
- Jonas Fränkel (1773–1846), German banker and philanthropist
- Jonas Fränkel (literary scholar) (1879–1965), Swiss literary scholar
- Knut Frænkel (1870–1897), Swedish engineer and arctic explorer
- Leó Frankel (Léo Fränkel) (1844–1896), Hungarian communist revolutionary
- Naftali Frenkel, 16-year-old killed in the 2014 kidnapping and murder of Israeli teenagers
- Purrel Fränkel (born 1976), Surinamese footballer
- Ray Fränkel (born 1982), Dutch Surinamese footballer
- Samuel Fränkel (1801–1881), German textile manufacturer
- Sándor Ferenczi (1873–1933), Hungarian psychoanalyst, born Alexander Fränkel

== See also ==
- Frankel
- Frankl
- Frenkel
