= Ernst Fraenkel =

Ernst Fraenkel may refer to:

- Ernst Fränkel (physician) (1844–1921), German gynaecologist
- Ernst Fraenkel (linguist) (1881–1957), German linguist
- Ernst Fraenkel (political scientist) (1898–1975), German political scientist
- Ernst Fraenkel (businessman) (1923–2014), British businessman

== See also ==
- Fränkel
