= Surinamese Footballer of the Year =

The title Surinamese Footballer of the Year (Voetballer van het Jaar) has been awarded in Suriname since 1964. The award is determined by a poll of Surinamese sports journalists as members of the VSJS (Vereniging van Sportjournalisten in Suriname) established in 2014, replacing the SOC (Suriname Olympic Committee) who determined the winners in the years prior.

== Footballer of the Year ==
Surinamese Footballer of the year			Golden Boot		
Year	Player	Club	Year	Player	Club
1964	Siegfried Haltman	Robinhood			
1965	Armand Sahadewsing	Transvaal			
1966	Frits Purperhart	Leo Victor			
1967	Frits Purperhart	Leo Victor			
1968	Edwin Schal	Transvaal			
1970	Remie Olmberg	Robinhood			
1971	Arnold Zebeda	Robinhood			
1972	Edwin Schal	Transvaal			
1973	Theo Klein	Transvaal			
1974	Rinaldo Entingh	Robinhood			
1975	Henry Playfair	Voorwaarts			
1976	Wilfred Garden	Robinhood			
1977	Remie Olmberg	Robinhood			
1978	Frank Borgia	Leo Victor			
1979	Wilfred Garden	Robinhood			
1980	Kenneth Stjeward	Robinhood			
1981	Carlo Monpellier	Transvaal			
1982	Not awarded				
1983	Rinaldo Entingh	Robinhood			
1984	Ludwig Simpson	Transvaal			
1985	Not awarded				
1986	Regilio Doest	Transvaal			
1990	Ricardo Winter	Robinhood			
1991	Ronald Kolf	Robinhood			
1992	Leo Koswal, Sr.	Robinhood			
1993	Leo Koswal, Sr.	Robinhood			
1994	Leo Koswal, Sr.	Robinhood			
1995	Leo Koswal, Sr.	Robinhood			
1996	Leo Koswal, Sr.	Robinhood			
1997	Leo Koswal, Sr.	Robinhood			
1998	Leo Koswal, Sr.	Robinhood			
1999	Orlando Grootfaam	Robinhood	1999	Clifton Sandvliet	SNL
2000	Roché Emanuelson	Transvaal	2000	Daniël Eduardo Ramadhin	WBC
2001	Lupson Rinaldo	WBC	2001	Clifton Sandvliet	SNL
2002	Patrick Zinhagel	Transvaal	2002	Clifton Sandvliet	SNL
2003	Harold Blokland	Robinhood	2003	Clifton Sandvliet	SNL
2004	Claudio Pinas	WBC	2004	Clifton Sandvliet	Transvaal
2005	Clifton Sandvliet	WBC	2005	Clifton Sandvliet	WBC
2006	Daniël Eduardo Ramadhin; Clifton Sandvliet	WBC; WBC	2006	Clifton Sandvliet	WBC
2007	Daniël Eduardo Ramadhin	WBC	2007	Daniël Eduardo Ramadhin	WBC
2014	Obrendo Huiswoud	Inter Moengotapoe	2014	Sorencio Juliaans	Transvaal
2015	Gregory Pokie	Inter Moengotapoe			
2016	Dimitrie Apai	W Connection			
2017	Dimitrie Apai	W Connection			
2018	Ivenzo Comvalius	Transvaal			
2019	Gleofilo Vlijter	Aris Limassol FC			

== Footballer of the Century ==
Surinamese Footballer of the century
Year	Player
20th century	Humphrey Mijnals

== See also ==
- List of SVB Hoofdklasse top scorers
