= Humbert Boerleider =

Surinamese footballer

Personal information
- Full name: Humbert Ronald Boerleider
- Date of birth: 17 August 1935
- Place of birth: Onverwacht, Surinam
- Date of death: 19 August 2016 (aged 81)
- Place of death: Paramaribo, Suriname
- Position: Midfielder

Youth career
- 1943–1948: Klein Maar Dapper
- 1948–1949: Hopper
- 1949–1950: S.V. Transvaal

Senior career*
Years	Team	Apps	(Gls)
1950–1951	S.V. Transvaal	?	(?)
1951–1952	VV Ajax	?	(?)
1952–1965	S.V. Transvaal	?	(?)

International career^{‡}
1957–1965	Suriname	8	(0)

Managerial career
- 1965–1969: Fortuna Sittard (assistant)
- 1969–1973: S.V. Transvaal
- 1973–1974: Suriname
- 1974–1981: S.V. Transvaal
- * Club domestic league appearances and goals as of 21 December 2015 ‡ National team caps and goals as of 21 December 2015

Humbert Ronald Boerleider (17 August 1935 – 19 August 2016), known as Boelie, was a Surinamese football manager and player who played as a midfielder in the Surinamese Hoofdklasse for S.V. Transvaal. He also played one season in the SVB Derde Klasse for V.V. Ajax before returning to Transvaal. He was an assistant coach for Fortuna Sittard in the Netherlands, and managed S.V. Transvaal and the Suriname national team for the nations 1974 FIFA World Cup qualifying campaign.

He later moved into radio broadcasting, hosting 'de ochtendsport' weekday mornings, and 'Sportrevue' on Sundays on RadioApintie. Boerleider died on 19 August 2016 in Paramaribo, aged 81.

== Career ==
Boerleider began his playing career on the 'Plein van 12 mei' at age 10, before moving to the Mr. Bronsplein where he played for Klein Maar Dapper together with future S.V. Transvaal teammate Puck Eliazer. He received his first lessons in football from Frederik Purperhart, the father of Frits Purperhart. At age 15 he was discovered by famed Transvaal scout Baas Mack who urged the young player to transfer to Hopper before joining the youth ranks of Transvaal. At age 17 Boerleider made his debut in the first team of Transvaal in 1950. He later joined V.V. Ajax playing in the Derde Klasse, the third tier of football in Suriname, before returning to S.V. Transvaal after one season. Manager of Transvaal Jim White was rejuvenating the first team selection and players such as Vossie Belgrave, Andre Watson, Liesdek, Woerdings, Edam Zwakke, Kartaram, Ferdinand Sai and Ferdinand Sleur, were replaced with the likes of Boerleider, Burzer, Karel Zeefuik, Tjiko Bijnoe, Blinker, Charley Marbach and Mauke Pool.

He was given his first pair of football boots from his brother who was playing for PVV at the time. He also travelled outside the country for the first time with S.V. Transvaal, traveling to Cayenne for a football tournament. He played for S.V. Transvaal for the remainder of his playing career, and helped the team to win four national titles in 1950, 1951, 1962, 1965.

== International career ==
Boerleider played for the Suriname national football team. He made his debut in 1957 against the British Guiana national team (now known as Guyana). He played his best match in 1959 on the island of Curaçao in a 2–2 draw with the Netherlands Antilles for the 1960 CCCF Championship qualification. The match marked the first time that Suriname were able to draw against the Netherlands Antilles playing on their home ground. In 1965 he played his only FIFA World Cup qualifying match against Costa Rica ahead of the 1966 tournament hosted in England.

== Managerial career ==
In 1965, Boerleider relocated to the Netherlands to earn a degree in sports. While attending his cios-education in Zeist, he served as an assistant coach for Fortuna Sittard. He returned to Suriname upon completion of his studies, taking over the managerial position at S.V. Transvaal helping the team to a national title in 1970, while finishing as the league's runner-up twice. In 1973, he became the manager for the Suriname national football team for the country's 1974 FIFA World Cup qualification process, finishing in second place to Trinidad and Tobago in the 1973 CONCACAF Championship qualification.

== Honours ==
=== Player ===
S.V. Transvaal

- Hoofdklasse (4): 1950, 1951, 1962, 1965

=== Manager ===
S.V. Transvaal

- Hoofdklasse (1): 1970
- CONCACAF Champions Cup (2): 1973, 1981
