= Leo Schipper =

Surinamese football player (1938–1984)

Personal information
- Full name: Leo Frank Schipper
- Date of birth: 20 September 1938
- Place of birth: Paramaribo, Surinam
- Date of death: 26 September 1984 (aged 46)
- Place of death: Paramaribo, Suriname
- Position: Midfielder

Senior career*
Years	Team	Apps	(Gls)
1956–1957	NAKS	?	(?)
1957–1958	Transvaal	?	(?)
1958–1964	Robinhood	?	(?)

International career^{‡}
1959–1963	Suriname	26	(1)

Managerial career
- 1968–1969: Robinhood
- * Club domestic league appearances and goals as of (21:17, 16 February 2016 (UTC)) ‡ National team caps and goals as of (21:17, 16 February 2016 (UTC))

Leo Schipper (20 September 1938 – 26 September 1984) was a Surinamese football manager and player who played for NAKS, SV Transvaal, SV Robinhood and the Suriname national team. After his playing career he took on a coaching role with SV Robinhood, becoming manager of the club before passing the torch to Ronald Kolf.

== Career ==
=== Early career ===
Born on 20 September 1938 in Paramaribo, Surinam, Schipper began playing football on the Mr. Bronsplein from where he was picked up by NAKS. Following a successful season, he transferred to SV Transvaal in 1957.

=== SV Transvaal ===
On 11 April 1957, Schipper transferred to SV Transvaal. His period with Transvaal was brief, transferring to SV Robinhood after only one season.

=== SV Robinhood ===
On 28 April 1958, Schipper or ‘Baas Skippa’ as he was commonly known joined SV Robinhood. He would remain with Robinhood for a decade in which the club traveled and played International matches against teams from Trinidad and Tobago, Brazil and the Netherlands Antilles. He also helped Robinhood to win two national championships in 1959 and 1961.

Schipper's biggest match was during his farewell match in the final round of the 1963 season on Valentine's Day (14 February 1964). Robinhood lost the match 1–0 to second place SV Leo Victor, with Leo Victor finishing as the league champions that season. The following season Robinhood would go on to win the national championship going undefeated, at which point Schipper had already retired as a player. The ceremonial final match of Schipper was overseen by Leo Raggobar and Eugene Rudge.

== International career ==
Schipper played for the Suriname national team. Having made 26 appearances for the first team, he was a part of the team which travelled to Peru for the 1960 Summer Olympics qualifiers, where he played against Cuba and Peru. He made his debut on 20 September 1959 in a friendly match against Martinique which ended in a 1–0 win. On 25 October 1959, Schipper played one of his best games against Trinidad and Tobago at the Rif Stadion in Willemstad, Curaçao. Two days later Suriname managed a 2–2 draw against the Netherlands Antilles, which was the first time the national team did not lose while playing in Curaçao. He scored his first goal on 4 April 1963 against Trinidad and Tobago, in a 4–3 win at the National Stadion.

== Managerial career ==
After his playing career Schipper took a coaching position with SV Robinhood, managing the club for two seasons before Ro Kolf took over. He later launched the Rensprojekt together with Jimmy Bhagwandas and Uncle Hoen, a sports association in his neighborhood in Paramaribo where he was an active member until his untimely death. There is a street in Paramaribo called the 'Leo Schipperstraat' which is named after him.

== Career statistics ==
=== International goals ===
Scores and results list Suriname' goal tally first.

Goal	Date	Venue	Opponent	Score	Result	Competition
1.	4 April 1963	National Stadion, Paramaribo, Suriname	Trinidad and Tobago	2–1	4–3	Friendly match

== Honours ==
=== Player ===
S.V. Robinhood

- Hoofdklasse (2): 1959, 1961
