= Frank Mijnals =

Surinamese footballer

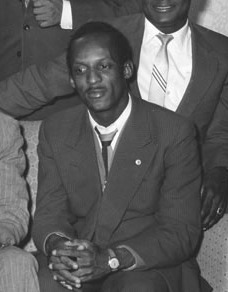

Personal information
- Full name: Franklin Mijnals
- Date of birth: 8 February 1933 (age 93)
- Place of birth: Moengo, Surinam
- Position: Forward

Youth career
- Remo

Senior career*
Years	Team	Apps	(Gls)
1951–1957	SV Robinhood	?	(?)
1957–1960	USV Elinkwijk	66	(7)
1960–1961	SV Zeist	?	(?)
1961–1962	VV Zwartemeer	?	(?)
1962–1963	FC Hilversum	?	(?)

International career^{‡}
1954	Suriname	2	(0)
- * Club domestic league appearances and goals as of (18:50, 17 January 2016 (UTC)) ‡ National team caps and goals as of (18:50, 17 January 2016 (UTC))

Franklin Mijnals (born 8 February 1933) is a Surinamese former football player who has played for S.V. Robinhood in the Surinamese Hoofdklasse, and for USV Elinkwijk in the Dutch Eredivisie. He also played for the Suriname national team.

He is the son of former Surinamese international football player Louis Mijnals, and the younger brother of Humphrey Mijnals, an international footballer as well with whom he played for the majority of his career.

== Career ==
=== Early career ===
Mijnals started his playing career on the Mr. Bronsplein in Paramaribo, Suriname, together with his brother. The two would be coached by their father, then Hoofdklasse player, and Surinamese International Louis Mijnals. Mijnals played in the youth ranks of Remo on the Bronsplein before getting picked up by S.V. Robinhood.

=== SV Robinhood ===
In 1951, Mijnals joined Robinhood where his older brother had already been playing. As an attacker he was known for his speed and goal scoring ability. While his brother departed for a professional career in Brazil, Mijnals remained in Suriname, helping Robinhood to four national titles during his tenure with the club. In 1957, Mijnals moved to the Netherlands in pursuit of a professional career, joining USV Elinkwijk of Utrecht where he would play with his brother once more.

=== USV Elinkwijk ===
In 1957, Mijnals joined USV Elinkwijk from Utrecht competing the Dutch Eredivisie, the top flight of football in the Netherlands. He joined his brother and former Robinhood teammates Michel Kruin, Erwin Sparendam and Charley Marbach once more. Together they made up what was known as the "five-leaf clover", a group of Surinamese players who had been signed by the club. He amassed 66 caps for Elinkwijk scoring 7 regular season goals in three seasons with the club. He was then transferred to SV Zeist, remaining in Utrecht.

=== Final years ===
In 1960, Mijnals was transferred to SV Zeist, relegating to second division. He would go on to play for VV Zwartemeer and FC Hilversum before retiring as a player.

== International career ==
Mijnals played for the Suriname national team. He made two appearances in 1954, in a set of friendly matches against the Netherlands at the André Kamperveen Stadion in Paramaribo. The first match ended in a 4–3 loss, with his brother scoring the third goal of the match. The second encounter ended in a 2–0 loss.

== Personal life ==
Mijnals is the second son of former Suriname International Louis Mijnals. His older brother Humphrey Mijnals played for both the Netherlands, and the Suriname national teams, and was the first player of Surinamese descent to play for the Dutch national team. He and his brother played together for almost the entirety of their playing careers. His younger brother Stanley Mijnals was also a professional football player in Suriname.

== Honours ==
=== Club ===
S.V. Robinhood

- SVB Hoofdklasse (4): 1953, 1954, 1955, 1956
