= Herman Rijkaard =

Surinamese association football player

Personal information
- Full name: Herman Harry Rijkaard
- Date of birth: 12 September 1935
- Place of birth: Paramaribo, Surinam
- Date of death: 30 September 2010 (aged 75)
- Place of death: Amsterdam, Netherlands
- Position: Forward

Youth career
- Ajax
- Robinhood

Senior career*
Years	Team	Apps	(Gls)
1955–1957	Robinhood	?	(?)
1957–1961	Blauw-Wit	?	(?)
1961–1962	Stormvogels	?	(?)

Managerial career
- Real Sranang
- * Club domestic league appearances and goals as of (09:38, 5 January 2016 (UTC)) ‡ National team caps and goals as of (09:38, 5 January 2016 (UTC))

Herman Harry Rijkaard (12 September 1935 – 30 September 2010) was a Surinamese footballer who played as a forward for Robinhood in the SVB Hoofdklasse, Blauw-Wit in the Dutch Eredivisie, and for Stormvogels in the Eerste Divisie.

He is the father of former Dutch international player and manager Frank Rijkaard.

== Career ==
=== Early career ===
Born in Surinam, Rijkaard began his football career on the Mr. Bronsplein sport terrein in Paramaribo, before he was picked up by one of the local clubs, joining the youth ranks of V.V. Ajax playing with the likes of Erwin Sparendam and Charley Marbach, before being recruited to the ranks of Robinhood.

=== Robinhood ===
Having played in the youth ranks of Robinhood, Rijkaard progressed to the Surinamese Hoofdklasse. As an attacker with a strong right foot, he helped Robinhood to national titles in 1955 and 1956. While making a living as a bookkeeper for a company called Kersten & Co., word started spreading in Suriname about a fully professional league being established in the Netherlands. Rijkaard soon relocated, joining Blauw-Wit from Amsterdam, the crosstown rivals of Ajax at the time.

=== Blauw-Wit ===
In 1957, Rijkaard joined Blauw-Wit playing in the Olympic Stadium in the newly formed Eredivisie, the top flight of professional football in the Netherlands. He would be reunited with his childhood friend Sparendam once more. Due to his strong physique, Rijkaard was gradually moved to a more defensive role on the playing pitch. A development his Son would undergo during his playing career as well. A 13th-place finish with Blauw-Wit in the league table was his best result in four seasons with the club, before transferring to Stormvogels from nearby Velsen.

=== Stormvogels ===
In 1961, he joined the Stormvogels, competing in the Dutch Eerste Divisie, the second tier of professional football in the Netherlands. He played for one season, before directing his focus towards family and the needs of Surinamese expatriates in the Netherlands, thus retiring from professional football as a player.

== Personal life and other work ==
After his career as a football player, Rijkaard took a job as a social worker in Amsterdam. He married Neel van der Meulen and in 1959 they had their first son Herman Harry Rijkaard Jr. Three years later, Franklin Edmundo Rijkaard was born. Herman Jr would go on to become a players' agent licensed by FIFA., while Frank would go on to play for Ajax, Real Zaragoza, Milan and the Netherlands national team, winning the UEFA European Championship in 1988 and the UEFA Champions League in 1995 with Ajax as a player, and as a manager in 2006 with Barcelona. Frank is one of the most successful players/managers in the history of Dutch football.

As a social worker, Rijkaard was intimately involved in the integration process of his compatriots who were emigrating to the Netherlands escaping political unrest in Suriname. He was the manager of Real Sranang, an amateur football club in the Netherlands for a while, and was also the secretary of the ROVI (Reünisten Oud Surinaamse Voetbalinternationals), an organization based in the Netherlands responsible for organizing reunion matches and events for former players of the Suriname national team living in the Netherlands. He died on 30 September 2010 of unspecified causes.

== Honours ==
=== Club ===
Robinhood

- Hoofdklasse (2): 1955, 1956
