= Leo Kogeldans =

Surinamese footballer (1930–2024)

Personal information
- Full name: Paul Leonard Kogeldans
- Date of birth: 28 June 1930
- Place of birth: Paramaribo, Surinam
- Date of death: 7 May 2024 (aged 93)
- Place of death: Venlo, Netherlands
- Position: Forward

Youth career
- VV Ajax

Senior career*
| Years | Team | Apps | (Gls) |
| 1946–1948 | VV Ajax | | |
| 1948–1957 | SV Voorwaarts | | |
| 1957–1959 | VVV-Venlo | | |

International career
| 1949–1957 | Suriname | 15 | |

Managerial career
- VCH
- * Club domestic league appearances and goals

Paul Leonard Kogeldans (28 June 1930 – 7 May 2024), known as Leo Kogeldans, was a Surinamese football player and manager who played for V.V. Ajax and S.V. Voorwaarts in the Surinamese Hoofdklasse, and for VVV-Venlo in the Dutch Eredivisie. He also played for the Suriname national team. After his career he was manager of Dutch amateur club V.C.H.

Kogeldans was the father of former professional footballer Ruben Kogeldans.

== Club career ==
=== VV Ajax ===
Kogeldans was born in the Frimangron neighborhood of Paramaribo, Suriname, a neighborhood known for producing top athletes. He began his football career playing on the Mr. Bronsplein where he was picked up by V.V. Ajax, playing in the Hoofdklasse. Ajax played barefoot at the time, and Kogeldans soon became known for his dribbling skills and goal scoring abilities. The top clubs in the country were eager to sign the young player, but it was talent scout Frits Juda who had convinced Kogeldans to sign with S.V. Voorwaarts instead.

=== SV Voorwaarts ===
Kogeldans joined SV Voorwaarts at age 18. He was an effective goal scorer, scoring a hat-trick in a 6–5 win against MVV in his first year with the club. In 1949 he was called up for the Suriname national team based on his performance. He helped Voorwaarts to win two national championships in 1952 and in 1957, before departing for the Netherlands.

=== VVV-Venlo ===
In 1957, Kogeldans relocated to Venlo, Netherlands signing with VVV-Venlo. He scored another hat-trick in his first match with the club in a friendly against German club 1860 Munich. Kogeldans went on to play two full seasons with VVV, helping the club to a 7th-place finish on the league table in both seasons. He was the first footballer of the African diaspora to play professionally for VVV-Venlo.

== International career ==
Kogeldans made his debut for the Suriname national team in 1949. He made a total 15 appearances for the first team before departing for the Netherlands.

== Managerial career ==
After his playing career Kogeldans managed Dutch amateur club V.C.H. (Voetbal Club Horsterweg) from Venlo.

== Personal life ==
On 7 February 1957, Kogeldans married Eveline Pinas, having four children together. His son Ruben Kogeldans played professional football for VVV-Venlo and Willem II before his untimely death on 7 June 1989 aboard the Surinam Airways Flight 764 which crashed during approach to Paramaribo.

Kogeldans died on 7 May 2024, at the age of 93.

== Honours ==
S.V. Voorwaarts

- SVB Hoofdklasse: 1952, 1957
