= Wilfred Garden =

Surinamese footballer

Personal information
- Full name: Wilfred Frederik Garden
- Place of birth: Paramaribo, Surinam
- Position: Defender

Youth career
- 1966–1969: Robinhood

Senior career*
Years	Team	Apps	(Gls)
1969–1981	Robinhood		

International career
1972–1978	Suriname	12	(0)
- * Club domestic league appearances and goals

Wilfred 'Omoe' Frederik Garden is a Surinamese former footballer who played as a defender for SV Robinhood in the Hoofdklasse, and for the Suriname national team. Together with Remie Olmberg, he formed the heart of the defense for both Robinhood and for the national team. He played for over a decade during one of the club's most successful periods, having won six national titles and finishing as runners-up in the CONCACAF Champions Cup on three occasions as well. He also won the Surinamese Footballer of the Year award on two occasions.

== Club career ==
Garden began his career at the top flight in Suriname in 1969 playing for S.V. Robinhood in the Surinamese Hoofdklasse, playing with the likes of Theo Blaaker, Ewout Leefland and Remie Olmberg. Together with Olmberg, Garden would go on to form the heart of the defense for S.V. Robinhood, both defenders would go on to become the first choice center backs for the Suriname national team as well. In 1971, he helped Robinhood to win the national title, qualifying for the CONCACAF Champions' Cup, making it to the finals the following year, bowing out to Olimpia from Honduras 1–0 on aggregate score in the final.

Garden won his second national title with Robinhood in 1975, qualifying for the CONCACAF Champions' Cup once more. In 1976 Robinhood would go on to win consecutive national titles and Garden's third overall, while also making it to the 1976 CONCACAF Champions' Cup final once more. Robinhood finished second to Águila from El Salvador, losing 8–2 on aggregate score in the final. In 1977, he helped Robinhood to the 1977 CONCACAF Champions' Cup final for the second time in a row where they faced Club América from Mexico, losing 1–0 on aggregate score. It was Garden's third time in the finals of the competition, with his performance earning him the National Footballer of the Year award in both 1976 and 1979. His period with Robinhood is considered one of the best in the club's history.

== International career ==
Garden played for the Suriname national team making his debut on 29 August 1976 in a 1978 FIFA World Cup qualifying match against Guyana. The match ended in a 3–0 win for Suriname. That year the national team managed to secure the CFU Championship, as well as an eighth-place finish in the finals of the 1977 CONCACAF Championship qualification. Garden has also played in the qualifying campaign for the 1980 Summer Olympics.

== Honours ==
S.V. Robinhood

- SVB Hoofdklasse (6): 1971, 1975, 1976, 1979, 1980, 1981
- CONCACAF Champions' Cup runner-up: 1972, 1976, 1977

Suriname

- CFU Championship: 1978

Individual

- Surinamese Footballer of the Year: 1976, 1979
