= Iwan Fränkel =

Surinamese footballer (1941–2019)

Personal information
- Full name: Iwan Otto Fränkel
- Date of birth: 19 January 1941
- Place of birth: Paramaribo, Surinam
- Date of death: 6 December 2019 (aged 78)
- Position: Midfielder

Senior career*
Years	Team	Apps	(Gls)
1960–1962	Transvaal		
1962–1964	Blauw-Wit		
1964–1966	ETB Schwarz-Weiß	62	(13)
1966–1971	Royal Antwerp	109	(23)
1971–1973	Amersfoort		

International career
1960	Suriname	1	(0)
- * Club domestic league appearances and goals

Iwan Otto "Pietje" Fränkel (19 January 1941 – 6 December 2019), was a Surinamese International football player who has played for Transvaal in the Hoofdklasse, Blauw-Wit in the Dutch Eredivisie, Schwarz-Weiß Essen in the Regionalliga West in West Germany, Royal Antwerp F.C. in the Belgian Eerste Klasse and for SC Amersfoort in the Dutch Eerste Divisie.

== Career ==
=== SV Transvaal ===
Born 19 January 1941 in Paramaribo, Surinam, Fränkel began his career on the Mr. Bronsplein from where he joined the youth ranks of S.V. Transvaal, one of the stronger clubs from the capital at the time. He made his debut for the first team in 1960, and two seasons later helped the club to their sixth national championship. He then relocated to the Netherlands to play professionally for Blauw-Wit Amsterdam in the Dutch Eredivisie.

=== Blauw-Wit Amsterdam ===
In 1962 Fränkel emigrated to the Netherlands to play professional football in the newly formed Eredivisie, joining Blauw-Wit Amsterdam], helping them to a third-place finish in his first season with the club. Playing at the Olympic Stadium in Amsterdam, he would become one of Suriname's earliest footballing exports, following in the footsteps of Herman Rijkaard who had joined Blauw-Wit from Robinhood a couple of years before him.

=== ETB Schwarz-Weiß ===
In 1964 Fränkel moved to Essen, West Germany joining ETB Schwarz-Weiß competing in the German Regionalliga West for two seasons before joining Royal Antwerp in Belgium.

=== Royal Antwerp ===
In 1966 Fränkel joined Royal Antwerp from Antwerp, Belgium competing in the Belgian Eerste Klasse, the top flight of football in Belgium. He played five seasons for the club, amassing 109 regular season caps, while scoring 23 goals. Participating in the Intertoto Cup of 1966 and 1968, where the team played against Union Luxembourg, Kilmarnock FC and Göztepe Izmir with a second round exit yielding the best result in the 1966–67 edition. Having been relegated to the Tweede Klasse, he helped Royal Antwerp to promote back to the top flight before parting ways with the club.

=== SC Amersfoort ===
Fränkel then played in the Eerste Divisie, the second tier of professional football in the Netherlands, for SC Amersfoort before retiring as a player.

== International career ==
=== Suriname ===
Fränkel played for the National team of Suriname receiving one call up, playing against the Netherlands in a 4–3 loss at the National Stadion in Paramaribo on 3 July 1960, before he relocated to the Netherlands.

== Personal life and death ==
Fränkel was the father of Suriname International footballer Ray Fränkel and the uncle of Purrel Fränkel who also played professionally in the Netherlands.

He died on 6 December 2019, at the age of 78.

== Honours ==
S.V. Transvaal

- SVB Hoofdklasse: 1962
