= Stanley Duyzer =

Surinamese footballer and manager

Personal information
- Full name: Stanley Duyzer
- Date of birth: 16 February 1935
- Place of birth: Coronie, Surinam
- Date of death: 18 February 2015 (aged 80)
- Place of death: Paramaribo, Suriname
- Position: Midfielder

Youth career
- 1945–1950: Holland
- 1950–1952: Torpedo

Senior career*
Years	Team	Apps	(Gls)
1952–1957	TGG	?	(?)
1957–1969	Robinhood	?	(?)

Managerial career
- 1969–2000: Robinhood (youth)
- * Club domestic league appearances and goals as of (19:10, 16 January 2016 (UTC)) ‡ National team caps and goals as of (19:10, 16 January 2016 (UTC))

Stanley Duyzer (16 February 1935 – 18 February 2015) was a Surinamese football manager and player who played the majority of his career as a midfielder in the Hoofdklasse for S.V. Robinhood. He later managed the youth teams of Robinhood under head coach Ronald Kolf for the remainder of his career.

== Career ==
=== Early career ===
Duyzer began his career in 1945 at age 10 joining the youth ranks of Holland in Coronie where he was born. As a child he would spend his Summers in Paramaribo, where he would watch S.V. Robinhood practice on the Wees Paraat terrein, where he meet Louis Mijnals and Michel Kruin. In 1950 he moved to the city to play for Torpedo on the Mr. Bronsplein, with ambitions to one day play for Robinhood.

=== TGG ===
Moving to Combé in 1952, Duyzer joined The Goal Getters (TGG) from Moengo, where he played with Leo Marcet at the time, making his debut in the top flight of Suriname.

=== Robinhood ===
In 1957 he joined Robinhood, playing with the likes of Ronald Kolf and Siegfried Haltman. He helped Robinhood to win three national titles while playing for the club. In 1967 Robinhood head coach Humphrey Mac Nack offered Duyzer a coaching position to coach the youth teams of the club. Duyzer rejected the offer, but two years later however, accepted the offer from newly appointed manager and former team mate Kolf.

== Managerial career ==
In 1969, Duyzer took over as manager of the S.V. Robinhood youth teams under newly appointed manager Ronald Kolf. In 1974, he led the juniors team to an undefeated National championship, finishing as runner-up with two other youth teams. At Robinhood, he was largely responsible for the talent development in the ranks of the club, having helped to shape many of the talents to emerge during one of the club's most successful periods under longtime manager and friend Kolf. Duyzer is considered one of the country's most important people in player development in the sport, having won various titles with the youth teams of Robinhood during his career. He died in 2015, two days after his 80th birthday.

== Honors ==
=== Club ===
S.V. Robinhood

- SVB Hoofdklasse (3): 1959, 1961, 1964
