= Ray Fränkel =

Dutch Surinamese footballer

Personal information
- Full name: Raymond Fränkel
- Date of birth: 15 September 1981 (age 45)
- Place of birth: Paramaribo, Suriname
- Height: 1.82 m (6 ft 0 in)
- Position: Defender

Youth career
- –1998: Transvaal
- 1998–2001: Feyenoord

Senior career*
Years	Team	Apps	(Gls)
2002–2002	Flora Tallinn	14	(0)
2003–2005	Groningen	5	(0)
2004–2005	→ Fortuna Sittard (loan)	12	(0)
2005–2007	Haarlem	49	(2)
2007–2010	Royal Antwerp	59	(3)
2010	FC Lisse	12	(1)
2011–2013	Al-Shahaniya	2	(0)
2013	Transvaal		

International career
2013	Suriname	3	(0)

Managerial career
- 2022: Suriname W
- * Club domestic league appearances and goals

Ray Fränkel (born 15 September 1982) is a Dutch Surinamese former professional footballer who played as a defender.

== Career ==
Born in Paramaribo, Fränkel started his playing career at the local S.V. Transvaal, before being snapped by the Dutch club Feyenoord Rotterdam. After failing to break into the Feyenoord's first team, Fränkel moved to the Estonian Meistriliiga side Flora Tallinn. He made a total of 14 appearances for Flora, before returning to the Netherlands for the 2003–04 season, when he signed with FC Groningen.

After failing to make any real impact and finding his first-team opportunities limited at the Eredivisie club, Fränkel moved again, this time to Eerste Divisie side Fortuna Sittard. After one season and not much first-team action at the new club, he moved to Fortuna's Eerste Divisie rivals HFC Haarlem. In 2007 Fränkel signed with the Belgian club Antwerp FC. After three years was in summer 2010 released by Antwerp and signed on 4 September 2010 with Topklasse club FC Lisse. After half a year resigned his contract with Lisse and joined Al-Shahaniya of Qatar. On 1 July 2013, he signed with one of Suriname's most successful clubs S.V. Transvaal.

== Personal life ==
Ray is the Son of Iwan Fränkel, and the cousin of Purrel Fränkel.
