= Armand Sahadewsing =

Surinamese football player and manager (1939–2019)

- Sahadewsing lining up for DWS in 1967

Personal information
- Full name: Armand Sahadewsing
- Date of birth: 7 July 1939
- Place of birth: Paramaribo, Surinam
- Date of death: 22 February 2019 (aged 79)
- Position: Right winger

Youth career
- 1950–1952: KMD
- 1952–1954: Sparta
- 1954–1955: Tuna
- 1955–1956: Unitas

Senior career*
Years	Team	Apps	(Gls)
1956–1966	Transvaal	?	(?)
1967–1968	DWS	2	(0)

International career^{‡}
1957–1966	Suriname	6	(0)

Managerial career
- 1980–1982: Suriname
- * Club domestic league appearances and goals as of 25 December 2015 ‡ National team caps and goals as of 25 December 2015

Armand Sahadewsing (7 July 1939 – 22 February 2019) was a Surinamese football player and manager who has played for S.V. Transvaal in the Surinamese Hoofdklasse, and for AFC DWS in the Dutch Eredivisie. He also played for the Suriname national team and later managed the team for the country's 1982 FIFA World Cup qualifying campaign.

He died on 22 February 2019, at the age of 79.

== Career ==
=== Early career ===
Sahadewsing began his football career on the Mr. Bronsplein in Paramaribo, Surinam at age 10 playing for KMD (Klein Maar Dapper), a club registered through the Bronsplein Sport Bond which was specifically for shorter people (Klein Maar Dapper is Dutch for "Small but courageous"). After two season with KMD he transferred to the youth ranks of Sparta, Tuna and finally Unitas. At age 16 he transferred to SV Transvaal to play in the Hoofdklasse, the top flight for association football in Suriname.

=== SV Transvaal ===
In 1956, Sahadewsing made his debut in the Hoofdklasse at age 16. He would go on to play for Transvaal for a decade, becoming the team's first choice on the right wing. He was made team captain from 1960 to 1965, and helped Transvaal to win two national championships in 1962 and 1965. He also won the Surinamese Footballer of the Year award in 1965.

=== AFC DWS ===
In 1966, Sahadewsing relocated to the Netherlands in pursuit of a KNVB coaching license. While in the Netherlands he joined AFC DWS competing in the Dutch Eredivisie, appearing in two matches in the 1967–68 season, where he played with the likes of Frans Geurtsen and Rob Rensenbrink.

== International career ==
Sahadewsing played for the Suriname national football team. He made his debut in 1957, in a 2–1 loss to the Netherlands Antilles, in the CONCACAF leg of the 1962 FIFA World Cup qualifying campaign.

== Managerial career ==
In 1966, Sahadewsing relocated to the Netherlands to obtain a KNVB coaching license. In 1980, he became the manager of the Suriname national football team for the country's 1982 FIFA World Cup qualifying campaign. Suriname were eliminated by Cuba in the 1981 CONCACAF Championship qualification.

== Honours ==
=== Club ===
S.V. Transvaal

- SVB Hoofdklasse (2): 1962, 1965

=== Individual ===
- Surinamese Footballer of the Year: 1965
