= NAKS =

Sports and cultural organization based in Suriname

Na Afrikan Kulturu fu Sranan
- Abbreviation: NAKS
- Formation: 4 May 1947
- Founder: Eugène Drenthe
- Type: Afro-Surinamese culture
- Headquarters: Paramaribo, Suriname
- Chairman: Siegmien Power-Staphorst
- Website: nakssuriname.com
- Formerly called: Na Arbeid Komt Sport

NAKS (Sranan Tongo: Na Afrikan Kulturu fu Sranan, English: Our African Culture of Suriname) is a social and cultural organization which promotes Afro-Surinamese culture and expression in Suriname and worldwide. The organisation was founded in 1948 with Eugène Drenthe as its first president, when it emerged as the successor of association football club T.O.P. (Tot Ons Plezier) which was founded a year prior.

Originally a multi-sports club, NAKS (then known as Na Arbeid Komt Sport) eventually evolved into a social and cultural organization promoting language, sports, music, arts and crafts of the African diaspora. Headquartered in Paramaribo, it also runs the NAKS Volkshogeschool (formerly known as the Volkshogeschool Kofidjompo) located in Lelydorp.

== History ==
=== Sports club ===
NAKS was founded in Paramaribo, Suriname as an association football club in 1948. The club had been renamed from T.O.P. (Tot Ons Plezier) to N.A.K.S. (Na Arbeid Komt Sport) only a year after its foundation on 4 May 1947. The team played their home games on the Gouvernementsplein, competing in the SVB Hoofdklasse, the top flight of football in Suriname until the organization ceased to pursue sporting endeavors. Over the years many of the country's top footballers have played for NAKS, including Frits Purperhart, Leo Schipper and Roy Vanenburg.

Aside from Football, NAKS also had a korfball, and a gymnastics team as well as a theater group and a music and dance school. The club's first president Eugène Drenthe described the atmosphere at the club as not merely a sports club, but a social club promoting a healthy lifestyle. Drenthe was a man who grew up as a kid on the streets who could relate to the troubled youth, and had made it his mission to provide a platform and a vision for the youth of Suriname, purchasing their first building in 1958.

=== Performing arts ===
Inspired by the close proximity in which the Afro-Surinamese and Indo-Surinamese lived together, Drenthe made his first attempt as a playwright, writing "Rudie, het voetbaljongetje" (English: Rudi, the football boy) in 1959. Soon the success of the NAKS theater group was recognized in the Netherlands. In 1964 the Stichting voor Culturele Samenwerking (English: Foundation for Cultural Cooperation) funded the travel of Dutch puppeteer Henk Zoutendijk to visit the organization and teach the group.

=== Folk high school ===
In 1965, Drenthe traveled to the Netherlands to attend the Volkshogeschool Overcinge. The formula of a Folks High School appealed to Drenthe. The combination of education, discussion, sports, music, socializing and practical work oriented towards family, work and nation building struck a nerve in Drenthe. Upon his return to Suriname he began working towards opening the NAKS Volkshogeschool.

On 29 April 1973 the Volkshogeschool Kofidjompo was opened in Lelydorp. The governor of Suriname at the time Johan Ferrier was present during the opening ceremony. The school was named Kofidjompo after the former name of the town Lelydorp. The name Kofidjompo comes from a runaway slave named Kofi who attempted to escape to freedom by jumping over the river. Djompo means 'jump' in Sranan, and Lelydorp is the location where the attempt was made.

The school was opened with the intention of turning Afro-Surinamese residents into citizens. The objective was to liberate the minds of the people from colonial indoctrination, and to instill a sense of pride and responsibility towards family, community, work and cultural understanding.

In 1973, there were 4 permanent teachers at the school. Norine Baarn, Wilma Plet, Grace Molengraaf and James Ramlall. In May of the following year Oscar Guermonprez visited Suriname, shortly after Henck Arron had announced the country's choice to move towards independence by the end of 1975. Guermonprez also visited the school during a discussion about the troubles in Surinamese society, high unemployment in a resource rich country. A big discussion ensued on how the Folks High School should contribute and cater to the Amerindians, Creoles, Maroons, Javanese, Indian, Chinese and Dutch people equally, to help in nation building after independence. Guermonprez had noticed the diversity in the staff at the school.

On 1 October the Folks High School had become an entity independent of the NAKS organization. James Ramlall became the new director of the school. Drenthe felt as though the country was not ready for independence yet, and his role within NAKS lessened. In 1976 the NAKS Folkshogeschool in Lelydorp wrote to the head office of NAKS in Paramaribo, that the school was doing well, and that they were distancing themselves more and more from a Eurocentric form and were becoming more Surinamese. In 1977 Drenthe left Suriname, emigrating to the Netherlands and settling in Rotterdam.

=== Contemporary times ===
Following Drenthe's departure, the organization suffered some set backs, with former staff members of the school leaving and opening a school with the same courses. Around 1994, a few faithful members led by chairman Wilgo Baarn, and in mid 1994 Eric Rudge was named the new chairman who successfully started the centralization of the debt incurred to afford a better view of things.

In 1995, Rudge traveled abroad for his studies and Mrs. Elfriede Baarn-Dijksteel became the first female chairman of the organization. Since then NAKS has developed a two-track approach, in which one track is aimed at investigating and documenting the Afro-Surinamese culture with the aim to transfer this in a dignified and respectful manner to the Surinamese society. The other track leads to education in the broadest sense of the word, which the formation of the Surinamese people, specially centralized around the Afro-Surinamese population.

In 2010 Mrs. Siegmien Power-Staphorst replaced Mrs. Baarn-Dijksteel as the new chairman of the organization.

== Presidents ==
- 1948–1974, Eugène Drenthe
- 1974–1980, James Ramlall
- 1980–1994 Wilgo Baarn
- 1994–1995, Eric Rudge
- 1995–2010, Elfriede Baarn-Dijksteel
- 2010–, Siegmien Power-Staphorst
