= MYOB (football) =

M.Y.O.B.
- Full name: Mind Your Own Business
- Founded: 7 February 1927; 98 years ago
- Dissolved: 1950 (changed name to SV Remo)
- Ground: Mr. Bronsplein, Paramaribo, Suriname

Mind Your Own Business commonly known as MYOB, was a Surinamese football club based in Paramaribo that played in the Surinamese Hoofdklasse, the highest level of football in Suriname. The club played their home games on the Mr. Bronsplein. The club was founded on 7 February 1927, and were one of the first registered football clubs in Suriname, and one of the stronger teams in the country prior to the War. In 1950 the team changed its name to SV Remo.
