= Aron Winter =

Dutch footballer and manager

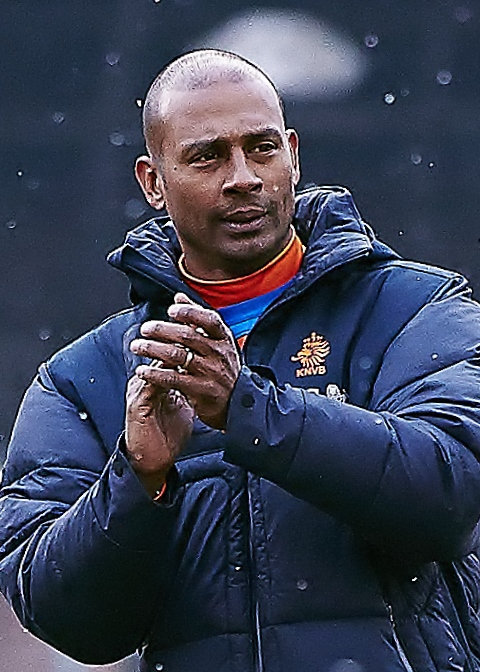
- Winter pictured in 2013

Personal information
- Date of birth: 1 March 1967 (age 59)
- Place of birth: Paramaribo, Suriname
- Height: 1.76 m (5 ft 9 in)
- Position: Midfielder

Youth career
- 1975–1978: VV Unicum
- 1978–1983: SV Lelystad
- 1983–1986: Ajax

Senior career*
Years	Team	Apps	(Gls)
1986–1992	Ajax	187	(46)
1992–1996	Lazio	123	(21)
1996–1999	Inter Milan	77	(1)
1999–2003	Ajax	51	(4)
2001–2002	→ Sparta Rotterdam (loan)	32	(1)
Total		469	(73)

International career
1987–2000	Netherlands	84	(6)

Managerial career
- 2005–2009: Ajax A1 (assistant)
- 2007–2009: Ajax A2
- 2011–2012: Toronto FC
- 2014–2016: Netherlands U19
- 2016–2017: Ajax (U19)
- 2017–2019: Ajax (assistant)
- 2019–2021: Greece (assistant)
- 2022–2023: Suriname
Medal record
Men's football
Representing Netherlands
UEFA European Championship
Winner	1988
Third place	1992
- * Club domestic league appearances and goals

Aron Winter (born 1 March 1967) is a Dutch football manager and former player who most recently managed Suriname. A midfielder, he played for Ajax and Sparta Rotterdam in the Netherlands, and for Italian sides Lazio and Inter Milan. Born in Suriname, he played for the Netherlands national team.

== Club career ==
=== Ajax ===
Winter began his career with amateur club VV Unicum in Lelystad, moved on to SV Lelystad, and the same year joined Ajax at the age of 19. His first game for Ajax was a match against FC Utrecht on 6 April 1986, which Ajax won 3–0. Winter won two KNVB Cups (1987 and 1988), the Eredivisie title (1990), the European Cup Winners' Cup (1987) and the UEFA Cup (1992).

=== Lazio ===
In 1992, he moved to the Roman team Lazio, playing his first match against Sampdoria on 6 September, which Lazio tied 3–3.

=== Inter Milan ===
In 1996, Winter joined Inter Milan, with whom he won the UEFA Cup in 1998. He had also played in the previous year's final, with the game going to penalties. However, Winter missed his penalty as Inter lost to Schalke.

=== Ajax return and Sparta Rotterdam loan ===
Winter left Inter for his former club Ajax in 1999. In 2001, he was loaned out to Sparta Rotterdam. He played 32 games for Sparta Rotterdam and scored one goal before returning to Ajax to finish his career, and where he chose to retire in 2003.

== International career ==
Winter was a member of the Netherlands national team that won the 1988 European Football Championship, but made no appearances during the final tournament.

He played in 1990 Italy World Cup where the Netherlands lost in the round of 16 round against Germany.

Winter was part of the Dutch squad that lost to later winners Denmark in the semi-finals of Euro 1992.

In the 1994 FIFA World Cup, he scored an equalizing goal against Brazil in the quarter-finals, making him the only player of Indian descent ever to score in a World Cup.

He was also selected for the Netherlands national team for Euro 96 in England, as well as the 1998 FIFA World Cup in France.

Winter was placed in Rijkaard's Euro 2000 squad and made his final appearance in the Dutch team in the semi-finals against Italy.

Having represented his national team 84 times, scoring 6 goals, Winter is currently the twelfth most capped player for the Netherlands national team.

== Style of play ==
Normally a central or holding midfielder, Winter was a hard-working and physical, yet elegant and classy team player of both quantity and quality. Owing to his development in the Ajax youth system, which was heavily influenced by the Dutch total football tactical philosophy, Winter was a versatile and well–rounded midfielder, who was capable of assisting his team both defensively and offensively, as well as creatively, courtesy of his physical, technical, and tactical qualities. Among his range of skills, he possessed significant stamina, acceleration, physicality, a good positional sense, intelligence, vision, passing, technique, and excellent striking ability from distance, as well as an ability to make late runs into the penalty box. Beyond his playing ability, he was known for his strong character, personality, consistency, composed playing style, correct behaviour, and leadership qualities, which made him a respected figure among his clubs' fans and teammates. In Italy, his best role was considered to be that of a left–sided central, offensive–minded box-to-box midfielder, known as the mezzala role in Italian football jargon, although he was also capable of playing on the right in a three–player midfield in a 4–3–3, a role in which he was often used during his time at Lazio. He would often start matches out wide before moving into the centre of the pitch. Moreover, he was also deployed on either the right or left flank, as a wide midfielder, wing-back, or full-back, in particular during his time with Inter; however these were not his favoured positions, and Italian pundits did not consider him to be as well–suited to these roles due to his less convincing performances. Winter was also occasionally used to great effect as a centre-back under manager Guus Hiddink with the Netherlands national team, with Elko Born of Bleacher Report even ranking him as the eight–best Dutch central defender of all time in 2014.

== Managerial career ==
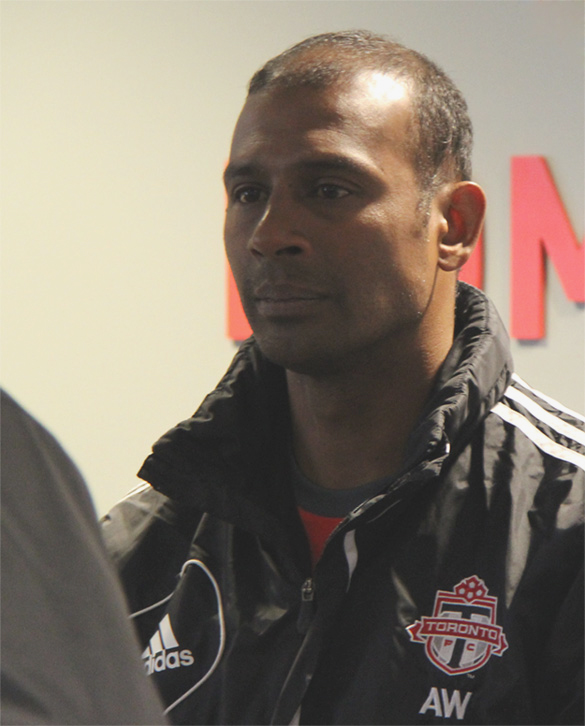
Winter in 2012 as manager of Toronto FC

After three years as assistant coach for the Ajax first academy team, Winter signed a three-year contract with Canadian side Toronto FC on 6 January 2011. Winter brought former colleague Bob de Klerk from Ajax to be his assistant coach, while Paul Mariner was also brought in the same day as Director of Player Development. After a disappointing season opener against Vancouver Whitecaps that ended in a 4–2 away defeat on 19 March, Winter won his first game as Toronto's head coach the following week against Portland Timbers 2–0 in Toronto.

Winter won his first trophy with Toronto in early July as Toronto defeated Vancouver 3–2 on aggregate to capture its third consecutive Canadian Championship, thereby earning a berth in the 2011–12 CONCACAF Champions League. Winter then guided Toronto to the Champions League semifinals, the first time a Canadian club had progressed that far in the competition. Toronto eventually lost 7–3 on aggregate to Santos Laguna.

However, Toronto began the 2012 MLS season with nine straight losses, the worst start to a season in the history of the MLS. Toronto won its tenth match 1–0 versus Philadelphia on 26 May 2012, but it was not enough to save Winter's job, as the club announced on 7 June 2012 that he would be replaced by the director of player development, Paul Mariner.

On 6 September 2022, Winter was announced as the interim coach for Suriname. Winter succeeds Stanley Menzo, who was at the helm of the team for seven months before leaving to work at Beijing Guoan. Winter is set to coach Natio in a friendly against Nicaragua and a potential second opponent.

== Personal life ==
Winter was born in Paramaribo, Suriname, to parents of Indo-Surinamese descent. His cousin Ricardo Winter was also a former football player/manager who headed the Suriname national football team.

== Career statistics ==
=== Club ===
Club	Season	League			Cup		Continental		Other		Total	
Club	Season	Division	Apps	Goals	Apps	Goals	Apps	Goals	Apps	Goals	Apps	Goals
Ajax	1985–86	Eredivisie	4	1	—		—		—		4	1
Ajax	1986–87	Eredivisie	28	8	5	1	9	1	—		42	10
Ajax	1987–88	Eredivisie	34	6	3	0	9	1	2 (Note: Two appearances in 1987 European Super Cup)	0	48	7
Ajax	1988–89	Eredivisie	27	6	2	3	2	0	—		31	9
Ajax	1989–90	Eredivisie	32	10	4	0	2	0	—		38	10
Ajax	1990–91	Eredivisie	33	6	2	1	—		—		35	7
Ajax	1991–92	Eredivisie	30	9	2	0	12	3	—		44	12
Ajax	Total		188	46	18	5	34	5	2	0	242	56
Lazio	1992–93	Serie A	30	6	6	2	—		—		36	8
Lazio	1993–94	Serie A	34	4	2	0	4	1	—		40	5
Lazio	1994–95	Serie A	29	5	6	1	8	0	—		43	6
Lazio	1995–96	Serie A	30	6	3	0	4	1	—		37	7
Lazio	Total		123	21	17	3	16	2	—		156	26
Inter Milan	1996–97	Serie A	24	0	7	1	11	0	—		42	1
Inter Milan	1997–98	Serie A	24	0	3	1	8	0	—		35	1
Inter Milan	1998–99	Serie A	28	1	6	0	7	0	1 (Note: Appearance in Play-Out Serie A)	0	42	1
Inter Milan	Total		76	1	16	2	26	0	1	0	119	3
Ajax	1999–2000	Eredivisie	34	3	1	0	5	0	1 (Note: Appearance in 1999 Johan Cruyff Shield)	0	41	3
Ajax	2000–01	Eredivisie	17	1	1	0	4	0	—		22	1
Ajax	Total		51	4	2	0	9	0	1	0	63	4
Sparta	2001–02	Eredivisie	32	1	—		—		—		32	1
Sparta	Total		32	1	—		—		—		32	1
Ajax	2002–03	Eredivisie	—		—		1	0	—		1	0
Ajax	Total		—		—		1	0	—		1	0
Career total			470	73	53	10	86	7	4	0	613	90

=== International ===
Appearances and goals by national team and year
National team	Year	Apps	Goals
Netherlands	1987	5	0
Netherlands	1988	2	0
Netherlands	1989	4	0
Netherlands	1990	4	1
Netherlands	1991	3	0
Netherlands	1992	9	1
Netherlands	1993	6	0
Netherlands	1994	12	1
Netherlands	1995	7	1
Netherlands	1996	9	1
Netherlands	1997	6	0
Netherlands	1998	9	0
Netherlands	1999	3	0
Netherlands	2000	5	0
Total		84	6

Scores and results list the Netherlands' goal tally first, score column indicates score after each Winter goal.

List of international goals scored by Aron Winter
No.	Date	Venue	Opponent	Score	Result	Competition
1	19 December 1990	Ta' Qali, Malta	Malta	4–0	8–0	UEFA Euro 1992 qualifying
2	30 May 1992	Utrecht, Netherlands	Wales	2–0	4–0	Friendly
3	9 July 1994	Dallas, United States	Brazil	2–2	2–3	1994 FIFA World Cup
4	29 March 1995	Rotterdam, Netherlands	Malta	3–0	4–0	UEFA Euro 1996 qualifying
5	29 May 1996	Tilburg, Netherlands	China	1–0	2–0	Friendly
6	30 April 1997	Serravalle, San Marino	San Marino	2–0	6–0	1998 FIFA World Cup qualification

== Managerial statistics ==
As of 8 June 2012

Team	From	To	Record				
Team	From	To	G	W	D	L	Win %
Toronto FC	6 January 2011	7 June 2012	64	18	21	25	28.13
Total			64	18	21	25	28.13

== Honours ==
=== Player ===
Ajax

- Eredivisie: 1989–90
- KNVB Cup: 1986–87
- European Cup Winners' Cup: 1986–87
- UEFA Cup: 1991–92

Inter Milan

- UEFA Cup: 1997–98

Netherlands

- UEFA European Championship: 1988

Individual

- Dutch Young Player of the Year: 1986

=== Manager ===
Toronto FC

- Canadian Championship: 2011, 2012

Ajax (as assistant manager)

- Eredivisie: 2018–19
- KNVB Cup: 2018–19

== See also ==
- List of MLS coaches
- 2001–02 Sparta Rotterdam season
