= Frits Purperhart =

Surinamese footballer (1944–2016)

- Purperhart in 1977

Personal information
- Full name: Frits Lambertus Purperhart
- Date of birth: 25 December 1944
- Place of birth: Paramaribo, Surinam
- Date of death: 29 September 2016 (aged 71)
- Place of death: Netherlands
- Position: Forward

Youth career
- Ajax

Senior career*
Years	Team	Apps	(Gls)
1959–1961	Ajax		
1961–1963	NAKS		
1963–1980	Leo Victor		

International career
1966–1979	Suriname	17	(3)

Managerial career
- 1978–1996: Leo Victor
- 1996–1997: Suriname
- * Club domestic league appearances and goals

Frits Lambertus Purperhart (25 December 1944 – 29 September 2016) was a Surinamese football manager and player, a member of the Suriname Olympic Committee board of directors as well as being a board member for the National broadcasting network Telesur in Suriname.

As a player, he played in the Surinamese Hoofdklasse for Ajax, NAKS and S.V. Leo Victor, as well as playing for the Suriname national team. He has also managed both Leo Victor and the Suriname national team during the span of his career.

He is considered to be one of the greatest footballers in the history of the sport in Suriname, having finished as the league's top scorer twice, winning the Surinamese Footballer of the Year award on two occasions as well.

== Club career ==
Purperhart began his career on the Mr. Bronsplein sport terrain in Paramaribo, Suriname where he was picked up by one of the local clubs, namely Ajax. His father urged him to transfer to NAKS, where he was coaching at the time, and Purperhart stepped over. After two seasons Purperhart transferred to S.V. Leo Victor. He helped the club to secure its second national title in his first season with the club. Known for his ability to score from a free kick, he is considered one of Suriname's best goal scorers of all time. In 1966 and in 1967 he won the Surinamese Footballer of the Year award consecutively, and in 1965 he became captain of S.V. Leo Victor. In 1970 and in 1972 he finished as the league's top scorer.

== International career ==
Purperhart made his debut for the Suriname national team on 10 June 1966 at the Coupe Duvalier tournament against Trinidad and Tobago in a 3–2 loss at the Sylvio Cator Stadium in Port-au-Prince, Haiti. He scored his first two goals for the National team on 13 June 1969 in a Friendly match against Denmark, scoring the equalizer and the second goal in a 2–1 win at the National Stadion. He played an important role in the countries 1970 and 1978 FIFA World Cup qualifying campaigns, also helping his team to win the 1978 CFU Championship.

== Managerial career ==
In 1978 Purperhart took over a player–coach function for S.V. Leo Victor before retiring as a player and fully committing himself to his managerial role. In 1996, he was appointed manager of the Suriname national team for their 1998 FIFA World Cup qualification campaign. His side was eliminated by Jamaica 1–0 in the 2nd qualifying round. He also managed Suriname to a fourth-place finish in the 1996 Caribbean Cup, losing to Martinique 3–2 on penalties after extra time, following a 1–1 deadlock, in the match for third place.

== Honours ==
=== Player ===
S.V. Leo Victor

- SVB Hoofdklasse: 1963–64, 1978
- Surinamese Footballer of the Year: 1966, 1967
