= Remie Olmberg =

Surinamese footballer

Personal information
- Full name: Remie Jacques Olmberg
- Date of birth: August 28, 1950 (age 76)
- Place of birth: Paramaribo, Surinam
- Position: Defender

Youth career
- 1964–1966: Froweinschool
- 1966–1969: Robinhood

Senior career*
Years	Team	Apps	(Gls)
1969–1978	Robinhood	?	(?)
1979–1981	Transvaal	?	(?)

International career^{‡}
1972–1978	Suriname	15	(5)
- * Club domestic league appearances and goals as of December 18, 2015 ‡ National team caps and goals as of December 18, 2015

Remie Jacques Olmberg (born August 28, 1950) is a retired Surinamese footballer who played as a defender for SV Robinhood in the Hoofdklasse, and the Suriname national team. He was the team captain for SV Robinhood for a decade during one of the club's most successful periods, having won three national titles and finishing as runners-up in the CONCACAF Champions Cup on three occasions as well. He also won the Surinamese Footballer of the Year award twice.

== Career ==
=== Early career ===
Olmberg began to play football at age eight under the tutelage of Jules Coblijn (SV Robinhood) and Saften (SV Voorwaarts). He played for the Froweinschool in the Mulo competition, before moving to the George Streepy Stadion playing in the youth ranks of S.V. Robinhood. In 1966 he was selected to play for the Suriname national youth team to compete in the Kingdom Games leaving an impression on then Dutch national team head coach George Kessler.

=== SV Robinhood ===
In 1969 Olmberg made his debut for the first team of SV Robinhood playing with the likes of Theo Blaaker, Ewout Leefland and Wilfred Garden. His impact on the team earned him the captain armband and in 1970 he was awarded the prize for Surinamese Footballer of the Year. The following season saw him win his first national title and Robinhood's eighth overall. Qualifying for the 1972 CONCACAF Champions' Cup, Olmberg would captain his team to a second-place finish in the tournament, losing to Olimpia from Honduras 2–0 on aggregate score in the final.

Olmberg won his second national title with Robinhood in 1975, thus qualifying for the CONCACAF Champions' Cup once more. In 1976 Robinhood would go on to win consecutive national titles and Olmberg's third overall, while also making it to the 1976 CONCACAF Champions' Cup final once more. Robinhood finished second to Águila from El Salvador, losing 8–2 on aggregate score in the final. In 1977, he led Robinhood to the 1977 CONCACAF Champions' Cup final for the second time in a row where they faced Club América from Mexico, losing 1–0 on aggregate score. It was Olmberg's third time in the finals of the competition, with his performance earning him his second National Footballer of the Year award. His period with Robinhood is considered one of the best in the club's history.

==== Caribbean All-Stars ====
On Sept 1, 1977 a friendly match was played at the Queen's Park Oval, in Port of Spain, Trinidad and Tobago between the New York Cosmos and the Caribbean All-Stars, a selection of International football players of the Caribbean Football Union. Olmberg was selected to captain the team, which included players such as Arsène Auguste, Hugh Bell, Leroy Spann, Ernst Jean Joseph, Orville Edwards and Jose Sabin. The New York Cosmos were captained by Pelé, and fielded players such as Carlos Alberto, Franz Beckenbauer, Giorgio Chinaglia, Rildo and Werner Roth. The match ended in a 5–2 win for the Cosmos with Chinaglia, Topić and Pelé scoring for the visitors. Olmberg played the full match, which saw Trinidadians' Spann and Llewellyn scoring for the Caribbean All-Stars.

=== SV Transvaal ===
In 1979, Olmberg transferred to cross town rivals S.V. Transvaal and in 1981 helped the team win their second CONCACAF Champions' Cup, defeating Atlético Marte from El Salvador 2–1 on aggregate score in the final. It was Olmberg's first Continental title, having been to the finals of the competition three times with his former club.

== International career ==
=== Suriname youth teams ===
Olmberg made his first appearance for the Suriname national team playing for the youth team in the 1966 Kingdom Games.

=== Suriname first team ===
He made his debut for the first team in 1972, playing in the country's 1974 FIFA World Cup qualifying campaign on 28 November 1972 against Trinidad and Tobago. The match ended in a 2-1 loss at the Queen's Park Oval in Port of Spain, Trinidad and Tobago, with Suriname failing to advance in the qualifying rounds.

Olmberg also played in Suriname's 1978 FIFA World Cup qualifying campaign. The team played the 1977 CONCACAF Championship qualification, finishing in 8th place in the final round. He scored five goals in the campaign, scoring against Trinidad and Tobago twice, as well as against Canada, Mexico and El Salvador. That same year he also helped Suriname to win the CFU Championship.

== Career statistics ==
=== International goals ===
Scores and results list Suriname' goal tally first.

Goal	Date	Venue	Opponent	Score	Result	Competition
1.	28 November 1976	Queen's Park Oval, Port of Spain, Trinidad and Tobago	Trinidad and Tobago	1–1	2–2	1978 FIFA World Cup qualification
2.	18 December 1976	Stade de Baduel, Cayenne, French Guiana	Trinidad and Tobago	3–2	3–2	1978 FIFA World Cup qualification
3.	8 October 1977	Estadio Azteca, Mexico City, Mexico	Canada	1–1	1–2	1978 FIFA World Cup qualification
4.	15 October 1977	Estadio Universitario, Monterrey, Mexico	Mexico	1–0	1–8	1978 FIFA World Cup qualification
5.	20 November 1977	Estadio Universitario, Monterrey, Mexico	El Salvador	2–3	2–3	1978 FIFA World Cup qualification

== Honours ==
=== Club ===
S.V. Robinhood

- SVB Hoofdklasse (3): 1971, 1975, 1976
- CONCACAF Champions' Cup Runners-up (3): 1972, 1976, 1977

S.V. Transvaal

- CONCACAF Champions' Cup Winners (1): 1981

=== International ===
Suriname

- CFU Championship (1): 1978

=== Individual ===
- Surinamese Footballer of the Year (2): 1970, 1977
