= Eugène Drenthe =

Dutch-Surinamese playwright and poet

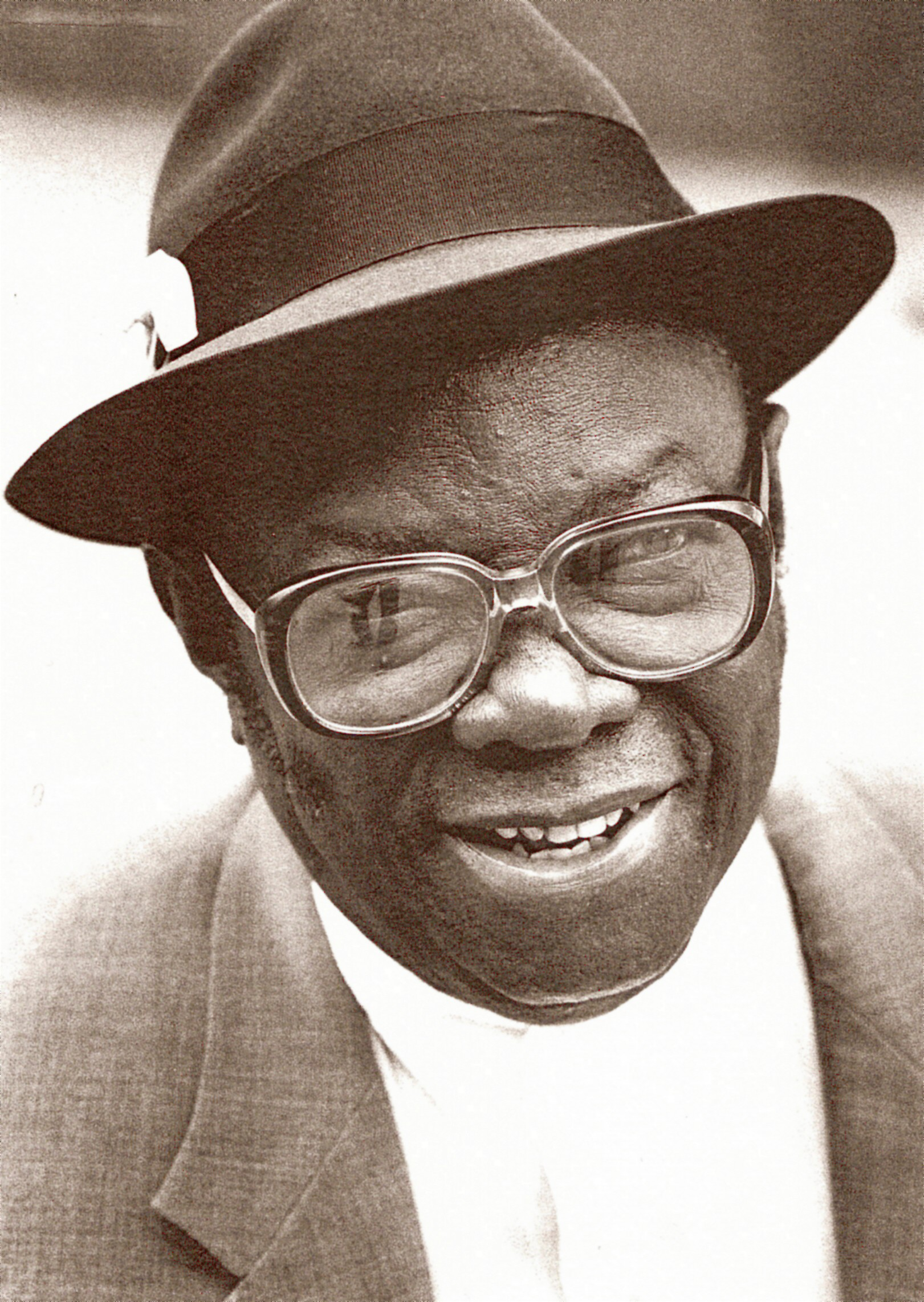
- Eugène Drenthe
- Born: Eugène Constantijn Donders Drenthe; 12 December 1925; Laarwijk, Surinam
- Died: 30 March 2009 (aged 83); Rotterdam, Netherlands
- Occupations: Playwright and poet

Eugène Constantijn Donders Drenthe (12 December 1925 in Laarwijk, Surinam – 30 March 2009 in Rotterdam, Netherlands) was a prominent Surinamese poet and playwright.

== Biography ==
Drenthe was born in Laarwijk, Surinam, as an illegitimate child of Louise Drenthe and the local police officer who was also the parish clerk. Drenthe used to talk about it as if it was normal. This down-to-earth attitude also characterized his plays which showed the normal life of the Creoles in Suriname. The plays were successful, Geheim in het gezin was performed 57 times in Suriname. Drenthe produced 25 plays in all, which include Rudy (1959), Kedjaman (1969) and Djomp abra (1977). From 1968 onwards, the plays of Drenthe were being performed outside of Suriname. First to Curaçao, Aruba, and Puerto Rico, and later to the Netherlands.

Drenthe was one of the founding members and first president of NAKS. NAKS was founded in 1948 as a social and cultural organization to promote Afro-Surinamese culture and expression. In 1982 Drenthe started to publish poetry in Dutch and Sranan Tongo. His first publication was Skuma/Schuim (1982).

Drenthe was offered a knighthood in the Order of Orange Nassau in 1972, but refused to accept it, because he had done nothing special. He moved to the Netherlands in 1977. He died on 30 March 2009 in Rotterdam, at the age of 83.

== See also ==
- Surinamese literature
