= Laarwijk =

- Location within Suriname
- Coordinates: 5°42′N 55°03′W
- Country: Suriname
- District: Commewijne
- Resort: Meerzorg

Population (2018)
  - Total: circa 100
- Time zone: UTC-3 (ART)

Laarwijk is a settlement and a former sugar plantation in the Commewijne District in Suriname. Laarwijk is situated along the Suriname River and can only be reached by boat (via Domburg).

== History ==
Laarwijk was founded in 1737. The government bought the plantation on 5 August 1899, and allocated it for small-scale agriculture. In 2020 plans were announced to build a bridge between Laarwijk and Domburg in order to develop the area, and relieve traffic congestion in Wanica and Commewijne. Traffic up to now has to use the Jules Wijdenbosch Bridge between Paramaribo and Meerzorg.

== Economy ==
After years of political prevarication in January 2010, Laarwijk has received a connection to the electricity grid. A cable is pulled from Domburg under the Suriname River. A generator which was installed just before the elections in 1996, had never produced a single kilowatt.

== Notable people ==
- Eugène Drenthe (1925–2009), poet and playwright.
