= Erwin Sparendam =

Surinamese footballer

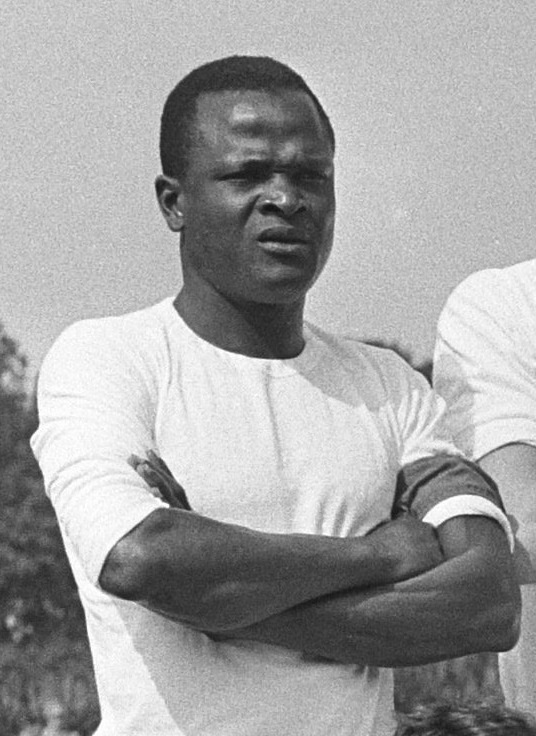
- Erwin Sparendam in 1968

Personal information
- Date of birth: 14 November 1934
- Place of birth: Paramaribo, Surinam
- Date of death: 20 September 2014 (aged 79)
- Place of death: De Meern, Netherlands
- Position: Right back

Senior career*
Years	Team	Apps	(Gls)
- Robinhood
1957	USV Elinkwijk		
1957–1958	Blauw-Wit	33	(10)
1959–1961	USV Elinkwijk	55	(7)
1961–1969	Blauw-Wit	67	(15)
- * Club domestic league appearances and goals

Erwin Sparendam (14 November 1934 – 20 September 2014) was a Surinamese professional footballer who played as a right back.

== Career ==
Sparendam moved from Robinhood to Dutch club USV Elinkwijk in January 1957. He was one of five Surinamese players to join the club at that time, the others being Humphrey Mijnals, Frank Mijnals, Michel Kruin, and Charley Marbach. The group was known as the 'Five Elements' and 'The Five-Leaf Clover' and were among the first Surinamese footballers to play in the Netherlands. Sparendam stated he was not subjected to racism during his playing days, though he did experienced racism in the Netherlands as he grew older. Sparendam also played for Blauw-Wit.

He appeared for Suriname in a friendly match versus the Netherlands in 1960.

After retiring as a player Sparendam became a coach, and managed a number of amateur club sides including Eminent Boys, Faja Lobi and DVSA.
