= Walther Braithwaite =

Surinamese footballer and manager (1933–2018)

Personal information
- Date of birth: 18 November 1933
- Place of birth: Nickerie, Surinam
- Date of death: 7 January 2018 (aged 84)
- Positions: Midfielder; left-back

Youth career
- VV Robinhood

Senior career*
Years	Team	Apps	(Gls)
1950–1956	Transvaal		
1956–1964	Voorwaarts		

Managerial career
- 1976–1977: Suriname
- 1985–1986: Suriname
- * Club domestic league appearances and goals

Walther Braithwaite (18 November 1933 – 7 January 2018) was a Surinamese football manager and player who played as a midfielder and left-back in the Surinamese Hoofdklasse for Transvaal and Voorwaarts. He also managed the Suriname national team for the nation's 1978 and 1986 FIFA World Cup qualifying campaigns, finishing in eighth place in the finals in Mexico in the 1978 edition.

He was also a cricket player and winner of three gold medals, who played for cricket club Rood-Wit in the Netherlands.

== Football career ==
=== Early career ===
Braithwaite was born and raised in the Nickerie District, Suriname where he joined local football club VV Robinhood (not to be confused with the club S.V. Robinhood from Paramaribo of the same name).

=== Transvaal ===
At age 17 he moved to Paramaribo and joined Transvaal. Becoming a key player on the first team, he would go on to play for the team for six seasons, while winning the national championship in 1951, before opting to play for Voorwaarts instead.

=== Voorwaarts ===
In 1956 Braithwaite joined Voorwaarts where he was moved from his usual midfield position to playing left-back. In 1957 he helped the club to its fourth national championship and his personal second in the league.

== Cricket career ==
=== RKSV Rood-Wit ===
In 1966 Braithwaite joined RKSV Rood-Wit playing in the Topklasse, the top flight of cricket in the Netherlands.

== Managerial career ==
In 1976 Braithwaite took over the managerial position on the Suriname national team, with Ro Kolf as his assistant he would help the team to an eighth-place finish in the finals of the nations 1978 FIFA World Cup qualifying campaign. In 1985, he took over as manager of the national team once more, failing to qualify for the 1986 FIFA World Cup after being eliminated in the qualifying rounds by Honduras.

== Honours ==
Transvaal

- Hoofdklasse: 1951

Voorwaarts

- Hoofdklasse: 1957
