= Ricardo Winter =

Surinamese football manager (1961–2015)

Personal information
- Date of birth: 2 April 1961
- Place of birth: Paramaribo, Surinam
- Date of death: 21 March 2015 (aged 54)
- Place of death: Paramaribo, Suriname

Managerial career
- Years: Team
- S.V. Robinhood
- 2010–2011: Suriname
- 2012: Suriname

Ricardo Winter (2 April 1961 – 21 March 2015) was a Surinamese professional football manager.

== Career ==
From 2010 until 2011 and in 2012 Winter coached the Suriname national team. Previously, he was a head coach of S.V. Robinhood. He died in 2015 due to health complications.

== Personal life ==
His cousin Aron Winter was also a professional footballer.
