= Ernst Fraenkel (linguist) =

German linguist (1881–1957)

Ernst Eduard Samuel Fraenkel (16 October 1881 – 2 October 1957) was a German linguist who made major contributions to the fields of Indo-European linguistics and Baltic studies.

== Life ==
Fraenkel was born in Berlin. He began his studies in 1899 in classical philology, Sanskrit, and Indo-European linguistics with Johannes Schmidt at Humboldt University of Berlin. In 1905 he defended his dissertation on ancient Greek denominal verbs. From 1906 to 1908 he studied with August Leskien, an expert on the Baltic languages, in Leipzig. He became Privatdozent at the Kiel University in 1909. After military service in the First World War, he was promoted to außerordentlicher Professor in 1916 and to ordentlicher Professor in 1920. Although his parents had converted to Protestantism, his Jewish background prompted his dismissal from the university in 1936 on the basis of the Nuremberg laws, and he was forbidden to publish scholarly works in Nazi Germany. From 1945 to 1954 he led the Seminar für vergleichende Sprachwissenschaft in Hamburg, where he died.

== Works ==
- Geschichte der griechischen Nomina agentis auf -ter -tor -tes (-t), I, II, Trübner, Straßburg, 1910–1920;
- Syntax der litauischen Kasus, 1928;
- Die baltischen Sprachen, Carl Winter, Heidelberg, 1950;
- Litauisches etymologisches Wörterbuch, vol. 2, Carl Winter, Heidelberg/Göttingen, 1962–1965 ();
