= Humphrey Mijnals =

Dutch-Surinamese footballer (1930–2019)

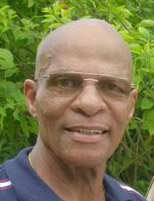

Personal information
- Full name: Humphrey August Mijnals
- Date of birth: 21 December 1930
- Place of birth: Moengo, Surinam
- Date of death: 27 July 2019 (aged 88)
- Place of death: Utrecht, Netherlands
- Position: Defender

Youth career
- Gompers
- Remo

Senior career*
Years	Team	Apps	(Gls)
1950–1955	SV Robinhood		
1955–1956	América Futebol Clube (PE)		
1956	SV Robinhood		
1956–1963	USV Elinkwijk		
1963–1964	DOS Utrecht		
1964–1966	SC 't Gooi		

International career
1954–1956	Suriname	45	(1)
1960	Netherlands	3	(0)
- * Club domestic league appearances and goals

Humphrey August Mijnals (21 December 1930 – 27 July 2019) was a footballer who played international football for both the Netherlands and Suriname.

== Career ==
Mijnals began his career with the Surinamese football club S.V. Robinhood in the 1950s, where he was one of the stars of the team and won four national titles. Then he played for six months for América Futebol Clube (PE) in Brazil. After this he returned to Suriname. Following his transfer in 1956 to Utrecht club USV Elinkwijk, he received a signing-on fee of $15,000 while his club received a transfer fee of 3000 guilders. The club contracted four more Surinamese footballers; his brother Frank Mijnals, Erwin Sparendam, Michel Kruin and Charley Marbach, collectively known as the "five-leaf clover". He was then transferred to VV DOS, remaining in Utrecht.

He debuted in the Netherlands national football team on 3 April 1960 in a home match against Bulgaria. Mijnals, nicknamed Minna, is best known for clearing a Bulgarian attempt on goal with an overhead kick.

In total, Mijnals played just three matches for the Netherlands, including a match against Suriname, because he came into conflict with the KNVB. The conflict arose after a training trip to South and Central America; he complained about the game and selection policy to a journalist, which resulted in him being placed on the list of unwanted players by the association.

Mijnals also played 45 times in the Suriname national football team. In 1999, he was elected Surinamese footballer of the century. On 24 August 2008, Mijnals also received Sports Medal of the city of Utrecht.

Mijnals died on 27 July 2019, at the age of 88.
