= Ronald Kolf =

Surinamese football manager and player

Personal information
- Full name: Ronald Wilfried Kolf
- Date of birth: June 5, 1939 (age 87)
- Place of birth: Paramaribo, Surinam
- Position: Forward

Team information
- Current team: Suriname (technical director)

Youth career
- Robinhood

Senior career*
Years	Team	Apps	(Gls)
1958–1962	Robinhood		
1962–1965	Transvaal		
1965–1966	Concordia		
1966–1967	Transvaal		

Managerial career
- 1965–1966: Concordia (player-manager)
- 1966–1967: Transvaal (player-youth coach)
- 1967–1968: Transvaal
- 1969–1976: Robinhood
- 1976–1977: Suriname (assistant)
- 1977–2000: Robinhood
- 2000–2001: Suriname
- 2001–2003: Robinhood
- 2003–2008: Leo Victor
- 2008–2013: Leo Victor (technical director)
- 2013–2017: Suriname (technical director)
- * Club domestic league appearances and goals

Ronald Wilfried Kolf (born June 5, 1939) is a former Surinamese football manager and player who last served as the technical director of the Suriname national team and a board member of Surinamese football club S.V. Leo Victor.

As a player, he played in the Surinamese Hoofdklasse for S.V. Robinhood and for S.V. Transvaal, having taken a brief player-coaching role at Concordia in Moengo, he would return to Paramaribo to finish his playing career at Transvaal. He is one of the most successful managers in Suriname, having led Transvaal and Robinhood to a total of 15 national titles.

== Playing career ==
=== Early career ===
Kolf grew up playing for various youth teams on the Mr. Bronsplein such as Rio, De Trappers and Millionaros, before getting picked up by S.V. Robinhood where he progressed through the youth ranks, winning two youth national championships. He was scouted by Andre de Vries. On the Bronsplein is where he grew up playing with players such as Wim Petrici, Jan Helstone van Eyck, Charlo Stynberg, and Kenny Headley. He was given his first pair of football boots by Etire Strok, whom he admired, but his greatest idol growing up was Humphrey Mijnals.

=== SV Robinhood ===
In 1958, Kolf made his Hoofdklasse debut in the first team of Robinhood. He would play with the team for three seasons, winning the national title twice in 1959 and 1961. In 1962 Kolf parted ways with Robinhood over differences with the technical team and signed with crosstown rivals S.V. Transvaal instead.

=== SV Transvaal ===
Kolf joined S.V. Transvaal in 1962, where he played for three seasons, winning the national title in 1962 and 1965.

=== Concordia ===
In 1965, Kolf relocated to Moengo, taking a teaching position at a school, where he joined local club Concordia, taking his first managerial role while also playing as a player. After two seasons, Kolf returned to Paramaribo joining S.V. Transvaal as a player-youth coach.

=== Return to Transvaal ===
Kolf returned to S.V. Transvaal, where he was playing for the first team while coaching the youth teams. After one season, which saw Kolf winning the national championship with the first team and two national championships with the youth teams, Kolf took over as manager of the club the following season, retiring as a player.

== Managerial career ==
Kolf took on his first job as a football manager when he relocated to Moengo for a teaching position at a local school. At the time, Kolf had joined the club Concordia, taking on a player-manager function for two seasons before returning to Paramaribo. Upon his return, Kolf took on a coaching position at his former club, S.V. Transvaal, coaching the youth teams, while actively playing in the first team. That season he was able to secure two National championships with the youth teams, while winning the National title with the first team. The following season, Kolf took on the manager position of S.V. Transvaal.

As manager of Transvaal, Kolf led the team to consecutive national titles in 1967 and 1968, before taking over the manager position of S.V. Robinhood. Kolf successfully led the club to 13 national titles, making it to the finals of the CONCACAF Champions' Cup on five occasions, namely in 1972, 1976, 1977, 1982, and 1983.

In 1976, Kolf was the assistant to Walther Braithwaite for Suriname's 1978 FIFA World Cup qualifying campaign. In 2000 Kolf took over as the manager of the national team after 31 years at the helm of Robinhood for the country's 2002 FIFA World Cup qualifying campaign, where they were eliminated by Cuba. He also helped Suriname in the final stages of the 2001 Caribbean Cup.

In 2003, Kolf took over as manager of S.V. Leo Victor, winning the Surinamese Cup and the Suriname President's Cup in his first year with the club. In 2008, he became the technical director for the club. In 2013 Kolf was made the technical director of the Suriname national football team.

== Career statistics ==
=== Manager ===
As of 20 December 2015

Team	From	To	Record					
Team	From	To	G	W	D	L	Win %	Ref.
Suriname	2 January 2000	26 May 2001	10	3	3	4	30.00	

=== Suriname matches ===
Win Draw Loss

Date	Location	Competition	Home team	Away team	Score
2015
5 March 2000	Castries	2002 World Cup Qualification	St. Lucia	Suriname	1–0
19 March 2000	Paramaribo	2002 World Cup Qualification	Suriname	St. Lucia	1–0
2 April 2000	Havana	2002 World Cup Qualification	Cuba	Suriname	1–0
16 April 2000	Paramaribo	2002 World Cup Qualification	Suriname	Cuba	0–0
4 April 2001	Paramaribo	2001 Caribbean Cup Qualification	Suriname	Aruba	5–0
6 April 2001	Paramaribo	2001 Caribbean Cup Qualification	Suriname	Barbados	2–2
8 April 2001	Paramaribo	2001 Caribbean Cup Qualification	Suriname	Grenada	3–1
16 May 2001	Macoya	2001 Caribbean Cup	Cuba	Suriname	4–3
18 May 2001	Macoya	2001 Caribbean Cup	Haiti	Suriname	1–1
20 May 2001	Arima	2001 Caribbean Cup	Suriname	St. Kitts and Nevis	0–4

== Honours ==
=== Player ===
Robinhood

- Hoofdklasse: 1959, 1961

Transvaal

- Hoofdklasse: 1962, 1965

=== Manager ===
Transvaal

- Hoofdklasse: 1967, 1968

Robinhood

- Hoofdklasse (13): 1971, 1975, 1976, 1979, 1980, 1981, 1983, 1984, 1985, 1986, 1987, 1988, 1989
- CONCACAF Champions' Cup runner-up: 1972, 1976, 1977, 1982, 1983

Leo Victor

- Beker van Suriname: 2003
- Suriname President's Cup: 2003

=== Individual ===
- Suriprofs oeuvreprijs: 2013
