= Ernst Fränkel (physician) =

German physician

Ernst Fränkel, Ernst Fraenkel (5 May 1844, in Breslau – 19 March 1921) German physician (gynecologist). He was the nephew of Ludwig F. Fränkel (1806–1872), German physician.

He studied medicine at the universities of Berlin, Vienna, and Breslau (M.D. 1866). He took part in the Austro-Prussian War in 1866 and in the Franco-Prussian War in 1870–1871 as assistant surgeon. In 1872 he established himself as physician, especially as accoucheur and gynecologist, in his native town. In 1873 he became privatdozent at the Breslau University, and in 1893 honorary professor. He took an active part in the politics and government of the city, and in 1903 was elected alderman of Breslau.

Fränkel wrote several essays for the medical journals, among which are:

- "Diagnose und Operative Behandlung der Extrauterinschwangerschaft," in Volkmann's "Sammlung Klinischer Vorträge," 1882;
- "Die Appendicitis in Ihren Beziehungen zur Schwangerschaft, Geburt und Wochenbett, ib. 1898

He is also the author of:

- "Tagesfragen der Operativen Gynäkologie," Vienna and Leipzig, 1896;
- "Die Allgemeine Therapie der Krankheiten der Weiblichen Geschlechtsorgane," in Eulenburg's "Handbuch der Allgemeinen Therapie und der Therapeutischen Methodik," Berlin and Vienna, 1898–1899

== Bibliography ==
- Pagel, Biographisches Lexikon, s.v.
