= KMD (disambiguation) =

KMD (Kausing Much Damage) is a hip hop trio.

KMD may also refer to:

- KMD Brands, New Zealand based retailer
- Kirchenmusikdirektor, director of church music
