= Purrel Fränkel =

Surinamese footballer

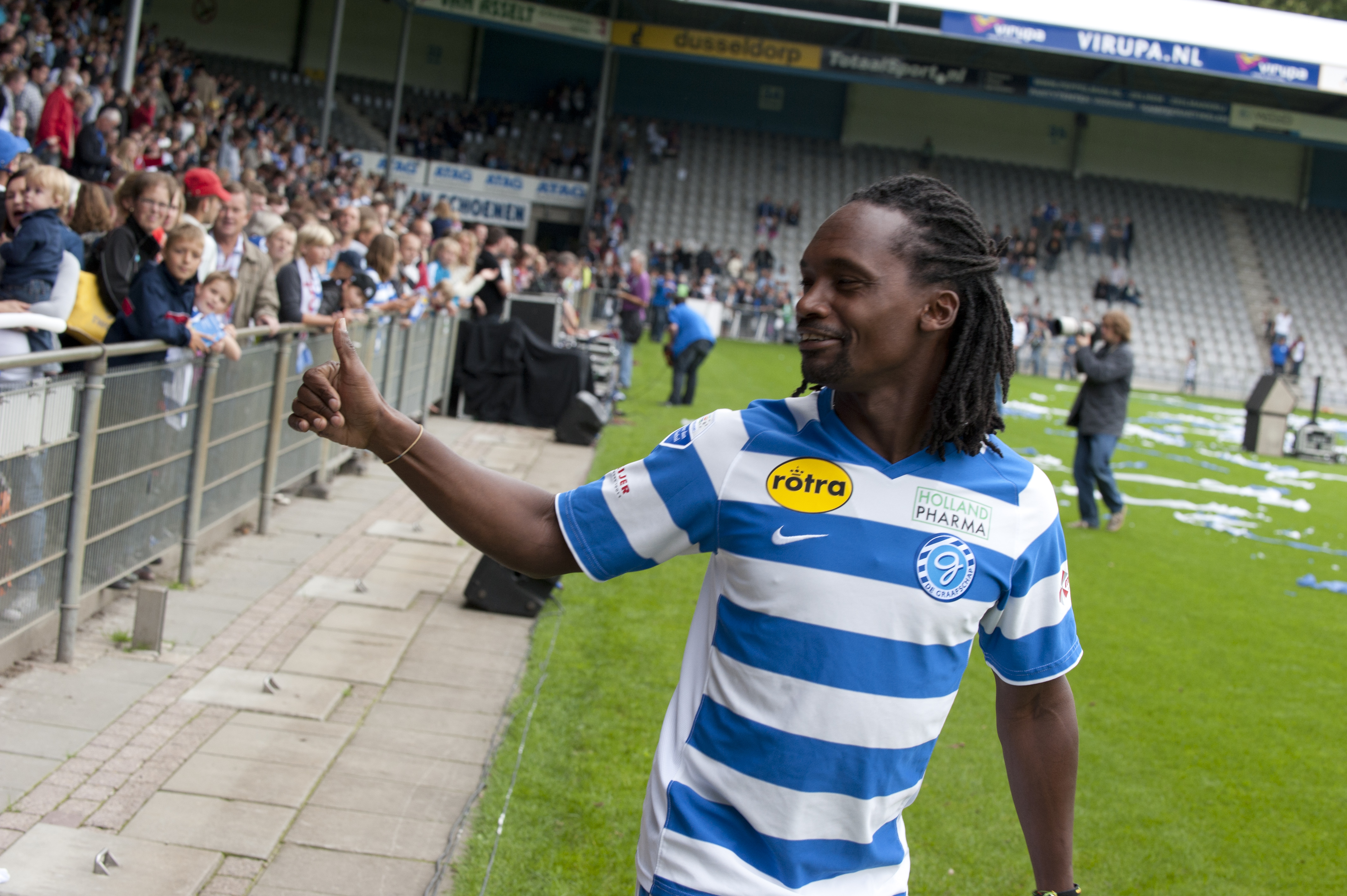
- Fränkel with De Graafschap

Personal information
- Date of birth: 8 October 1976 (age 50)
- Place of birth: Paramaribo, Suriname
- Height: 1.70 m (5 ft 7 in)
- Position: Left-back

Youth career
- Osdorp
- Amstelland
- Telstar

Senior career*
Years	Team	Apps	(Gls)
1994–1998	Telstar	88	(0)
1998–2002	De Graafschap	106	(1)
2002–2007	Vitesse	149	(2)
2007–2012	De Graafschap	131	(2)
2012–2019	DUNO		
Total		474	(5)
- * Club domestic league appearances and goals

Purrel Fränkel (born 8 October 1976) is a Dutch former professional footballer. A left-back, played 474 matches in professional football for Telstar, De Graafschap and Vitesse.

== Club career ==
Fränkel was born in Paramaribo, Suriname and made his debut in professional football, being part of the Telstar squad in the 1994–95 season. He also played for De Graafschap before joining Vitesse.

In 2003, he scored an own goal against FC Twente when the match was just 19 seconds old. This was an all-time record in the Eredivisie, but it was broken three years later by Arnold Kruiswijk of FC Groningen, who, in a match against Heracles Almelo, managed to pass his own goalkeeper after nine seconds.

In March 2009 he was suspended for a month by the Royal Dutch Football Association (KNVB) after testing positive on smoking cannabis.

After the relegation of De Graafschap in 2012, Fränkel decided he did not want to play in the Eerste Divisie any more and retired from professional football. He since played several years at amateur level for VV DUNO, and also worked as assistant coach during the 2018–19 season. During his time at DUNO, he helped lead the club from the ninth-tier Vierde Klasse to the fifth-tier Hoofdklasse.

== Honours ==
De Graafschap

- Eerste Divisie: 2009–10

DUNO

- Vierde Klasse: 2013
- Derde Klasse: 2014
- Tweede Klasse: 2016
- Eerste Klasse: 2018
