= USV Elinkwijk =

Dutch football club

Elinkwijk
- Full name: Utrechtse Sportvereniging Elinkwijk
- Founded: 1919; 1970
- Ground: Sportpark Elinkwijk, Utrecht
- Capacity: 5,000
- Chairman: Sjaak Luijendijk (a.i.)
- League: Tweede Klasse B (West 1) (2024–25)
- Website: elinkwijk.nl
Home colours	Away colours

Utrechtse Sportvereniging Elinkwijk, known as USV Elinkwijk is a Dutch football club, based in Utrecht. It played professional football during the years 1955–1970. Marco van Basten was a player of the club during his youth years.

== History ==
The club was founded in 1919. In 1970 DOS Utrecht, Elinkwijk and Velox merged in the club FC Utrecht. DOS Utrecht, Elinkwijk and Velox were refounded as amateurs clubs.

Elinkwijk played in the Hoofdklasse during the years 1974–1992 and 1996–2013.

== Managers ==
- 195X-1957 Gilbert Richmond
- 1957–19XX Wim Groenendijk
- 196-1966 Joop de Busser
- 1966 Piet Dubbelman
- 1966–1968 J de Bouter
- 1968–1970 Evert Mur
