= V.V. Ajax =

Surinamese football club based in Paramaribo

Ajax
- Full name: Voetbal Vereniging Ajax
- Founded: 3 June 1921; 103 years ago
- Dissolved: 1965
- Ground: Mr. Bronsplein, Paramaribo, Suriname
Home colours	Away colours

Voetbal Vereniging Ajax commonly known as Ajax, was a Surinamese football club based in Paramaribo that played in the Surinamese Hoofdklasse, the highest level of football in Suriname. The club played their home games on the Mr. Bronsplein. Named after the Dutch football club Ajax, the club was founded on 3 June 1921 by H. Gunning. The chairman of the club in its inception was H.M. Landkoer who successfully led the team to three national titles in the late twenties.

== Honours ==
- Hoofdklasse

Champions (2):1926, 1928

- Dragtenbeker

Winners (1):1929

- Emancipatiebeker

Winners (1):1929
