= Suriname national football team =

Men's association football team

Suriname
- Nickname(s): Natio (National); The Green Guardians
- Association: Surinaamse Voetbal Bond (SVB)
- Confederation: CONCACAF (North America)
- Sub-confederation: CFU (Caribbean)
- Head coach: Henk Fraser
- Captain: Myenty Abena
- Most caps: Marlon Felter (48)
- Top scorer: Gleofilo Vlijter (15)
- Home stadium: Franklin Essed Stadion
- FIFA code: SUR
First colours	Second colours

FIFA ranking
- Current: 128 (18 November 2026)
- Highest: 84 (August 2008)
- Lowest: 191 (December 2015)

First international
- Suriname 0–5 British Guiana (Surinam; 17 August 1915)

Biggest win
- Suriname 9–0 French Guiana (Suriname; 2 March 1947); Suriname 9–0 British Guiana (Netherlands Antilles; 17 February 1952); Suriname 9–0 British Guiana (Aruba; 9 February 1953)

Biggest defeat
- Suriname 2–9 Netherlands (Suriname; 30 July 1958); Aruba 8–1 Suriname (Curaçao; 6 June 1946); Mexico 8–1 Suriname (Monterrey, Mexico; 15 October 1977); Costa Rica 7–0 Suriname (San José, Costa Rica; 6 September 2008)

CONCACAF Championship / Gold Cup
- Appearances: 4 (first in 1977)
- Best result: 6th place (1977)

CONCACAF Nations League
- Appearances: 5 (first in 2019–20)
- Best result: Quarter-finals (2024–25)

CCCF Championship
- Appearances: 1 (first in 1960)
- Best result: 4th place (1960)
Medal record
CFU Championship
Gold medal – first place	1978 Trinidad and Tobago	Team
Bronze medal – third place	1979 Suriname	Team

The Suriname national football team (Dutch: Surinaams voetbalelftal, Sranan Tongo: Sranankondre fubal pluga) represents Suriname in men's international football, and is governed by the Surinamese Football Association (Dutch: Surinaamse Voetbal Bond), the governing body for football in Suriname founded in 1920. It has been a full member of FIFA since 1929, is a founding member of CONCACAF which was founded in 1961, and is also a member of CFU in the Caribbean Zone. Suriname is affiliated with CONCACAF, although geographically it is a country located in The Guianas in South America. From 1938 to 1961, the team was a member of CCCF, the former governing body for football in Central America and Caribbean. Suriname was also a member of PFC, the former unified confederation of the Americas.

Suriname has never qualified for the FIFA World Cup, but qualified for the inter-confederation playoffs for the first time in 2026. losing to Bolivia in the semi-final of the Pathway 2.

Suriname has participated four times in CONCACAF's premier continental competition, finishing as sixth place in the 1977 CONCACAF Championship. The team has qualified twice under the CONCACAF Gold Cup format. It has participated four times in League A and once in League B of the CONCACAF Nations League, reaching the quarter-finals in the 2024–25 edition. In subcontinental competitions, the team won the 1978 CFU Championship.

In a bid to strengthen the national team, the SVB has begun selecting many uncapped Dutch-born players eligible to play for the country for the national team, of which there are many due to the country being a former Dutch colony.

== History ==
Although the former Dutch colony is located in South America, it competes in CONCACAF, together with Guyana and French Guiana. Suriname was one of the founding members of CONCACAF in 1961. Suriname won the CFU Championship in 1978, were runners-up in 1979 and have achieved three fourth-place finishes in the CFU Championship/Caribbean Cup. Suriname discourages dual citizenship and Surinamese-Dutch players who have picked up a Netherlands passport – which, crucially, offers legal work status in almost any European league – are barred from selection to the national team. Many Suriname-born players and Dutch-born players of Surinamese descent, like Gerald Vanenburg, Ruud Gullit, Frank Rijkaard, Edgar Davids, Clarence Seedorf, Patrick Kluivert, Michael Reiziger, Aron Winter, Georginio Wijnaldum, Virgil van Dijk, Denzel Dumfries, Ryan Gravenberch, Xavi Simons and Jimmy Floyd Hasselbaink have turned out to play for the Dutch national team. In 1999, Humphrey Mijnals, who played for both Suriname and the Netherlands, was elected Surinamese footballer of the century. Another famous player is André Kamperveen, who captained Suriname in the 1940s and was the first Surinamese to play professionally in the Netherlands.

Suriname has participated in the qualifying matches for the FIFA World Cup since 1962, but has never qualified for the finals. Suriname's strongest showing in World Cup qualification was the campaign for the 1978 finals, when the national team reached the final group stage.

Suriname also came second in CONCACAF qualifying for the 1964 Olympics, behind qualifiers Mexico and third in qualifying for the 1980 Olympics, behind qualifiers Costa Rica and United States. The US then boycotted the Moscow Olympics, and were replaced by Cuba in the football tournament, after Suriname opted to boycott the games as well.

In 2008 Suriname advanced to the group stage of CONCACAF World Cup qualifying despite using only local players. With their two-leg victory over neighbours Guyana, Suriname moved on to face Haiti, Costa Rica, and El Salvador in the third round.

Inspired by the success of teams with dual nationals, especially Algeria, SVB president John Krishnadath submitted a proposal to the national assembly to allow dual citizenship for athletes with the then-goal of reaching the 2018 FIFA World Cup finals. In order to support this project, a team with professional players of Surinamese origin was assembled and played an exhibition match on 26 December 2014 at the Andre Kamperveen Stadion. The project is managed by Nordin Wooter and David Endt, who have set up a presentation and sent invitations to 100 players of Surinamese origin, receiving 85 positive answers. Dean Gorré was named to coach this special selection. FIFA supported the project and granted insurance for the players and clubs despite the match being unofficial.

As of May 2015, Gorré was the national team coach who oversaw both the official and unofficial teams. The professional team consisted of players willing to commit to Suriname if the dual-citizenship bill was approved, and played two international matches. In 2016, Roberto Gödeken became the head coach once again. In qualification for the 2017 Caribbean Cup, Suriname secured a spot in the third round, but finished second behind Jamaica in their group. However, as one of the three best second-place finishers, Suriname advanced to face Trinidad and Tobago and Haiti in the 5th place play-off. Suriname won the match against Trinidad and Tobago, but lost against Haiti, hence once again a failed attempt to make an appearance in the Concacaf Gold Cup.

In 2018 Dean Gorré signed a new 2 year contract with the SVB to manage Natio once more. His first game ended in a draw against Dominica in Nations League qualifiers. Gorré became not only the head coach of the senior team, but also oversees the youth teams and also has a helping hand in the introduction of a professional league in the country. Gorré also managed to arrange training camps for the national team in the Netherlands, where Natio have tested their strength against professional and amateur football clubs.

Suriname qualified for the CONCACAF Nations League B after wins against Saint Kitts and Nevis and British Virgin Islands, draw against Dominica and a loss against Jamaica. Suriname got to share a group with Nicaragua, SVG and Dominica. After a narrow away win against Dominica, Suriname got to bag a massive 6–0 win at home against Nicaragua.

In November 2019, it was announced that a so-called sports passport would allow Dutch professional footballers from the Surinamese diaspora to represent Suriname. On 19 November, Suriname qualified for the 2021 Gold Cup with 2–1 CONCACAF Nations League win over Nicaragua. It will be their debut in the CONCACAF Gold Cup and their first appearance in a CONCACAF tournament since 1985.

In the 2021 CONCACAF Gold Cup, Suriname played against Costa Rica, Jamaica and Guadeloupe in Group C. Suriname lost its first two matches against Jamaica and Costa Rica, but ended third in the group following a 2–1 win against Guadeloupe.

In late July, the Surinamese Football Association terminated the contract of Dean Gorré after failing to reach Natio's objectives. After the termination of Gorré, SVB announced that they have hired the services of Brian Tevreden's Tevreden Group. The Tevreden Group are involved in the search for a new national coach and the recruitment and selection of Surinamese-Dutch professionals who want to play for Natio.

Under Stanley Menzo's leadership, Suriname advances to its second CONCACAF Gold Cup (albeit its fourth continental tournament) in 2025 in the United States. Matched against Mexico, Costa Rica, and the Dominican Republic, it is defeated by the former two, drawing 0–0 with the Dominicans.

During the 2026 FIFA World Cup qualification third round, Suriname entered as the lowest-ranked of four teams in Group A but led for most of the campaign, which would have earned them a first-ever World Cup berth. On the final match day, tied with group favorites Panama on points but with a superior goal differential, Suriname suffered a 3–1 away loss to Guatemala while Panama defeated El Salvador, securing the automatic World Cup spot for Panama while dropping Suriname to a runners-up spot. Their only goal in the game, a second half stoppage-time own goal, kept them from elimination as they finished ahead of Honduras on goals scored as one of best two group runners-ups and qualified for the inter-confederation play-offs. However, Suriname suffered a 2–1 defeat to Bolivia in the inter-confederation play-offs, ending their World Cup hopes.

== Kit supplier ==
Kit supplier	Period
(Netherlands) Beltona	1992–1999
(Netherlands) Gunner	2000–2001
(Brazil) Topper	2002-2006
(United Kingdom) Xara	2007
(Netherlands) Copa	2008–2010
(Spain) Kelme	2011–2014
(Netherlands) Klupp	2015–2024
(Italy) Macron	2024–2026
(Spain) Kelme	2026–present

== Results and fixtures ==
The following is a list of match results in the last 12 months, as well as any future matches that have been scheduled.

Win Draw Loss Fixture

=== 2026 ===
26 March 2026 FIFA World Cup inter-confederation play-offs	Bolivia	2–1	Suriname	Monterrey, Mexico
16:00 UTC−6	Paniagua 72'; Terceros 79' (pen.)	Report	van Gelderen 48'	Stadium: Estadio BBVA; Attendance: 33,547; Referee: Alireza Faghani (Australia)

25 September 2026–27 CONCACAF Nations League A Group Stage	Honduras	2–3	Suriname	Tegucigalpa, Honduras
19:00 UTC−6	Moncada 20'; Róchez 23'	Report	Lonwijk 18'; Jubitana 39'; Palma 66' (o.g.)	Stadium: Estadio Nacional Chelato Uclés

28 September 2026–27 CONCACAF Nations League A Group Stage	Suriname	2–1	Martinique	Paramaribo, Suriname
19:00 UTC−3	Lonwijk 54'; Kerk 69'	Report	Moltenis 81'	Stadium: Dr. Ir. Franklin Essed Stadion

2 October 2026–27 CONCACAF Nations League A Group Stage	Suriname	0–0	Guatemala	Paramaribo, Suriname
19:00 UTC−3		Report		Stadium: Dr. Ir. Franklin Essed Stadion

5 October 2026–27 CONCACAF Nations League A Group Stage	Guatemala	1–0	Suriname	Guatemala City, Guatemala
18:00 UTC−6	Evans 90+6'	Report		Stadium: Estadio Manuel Felipe Carrera

12 November 2026 Friendly	Lithuania	0–0	Suriname	Kaunas, Lithuania
19:00 UTC+2		Report		Stadium: Darius and Girėnas Stadium

15 November 2026 Friendly	Suriname	4–0	Eswatini	's-Hertogenbosch, Netherlands
	Kerk 6'; Garden 60'; Piroe 68', 80'	Report		Stadium: De Vliert

== Coaching staff ==
As of 25 September 2026

Staff
Head coach	(Netherlands) (Suriname) Henk Fraser
Assistant Coach	(Netherlands) (Suriname) Ulrich van Gobbel
Goalkeeping Coach	(Netherlands) Bart Tinus
Fitness Coach	(Netherlands) Nol Hornix
Team Doctor	(Netherlands) Ted den Hoed
Team Doctor	(Netherlands) Simon Knops
Physiotherapists	(Netherlands) Rogier Hoek
Video Analyst	(Netherlands) Leon Hese

=== Coaching history ===
Caretaker managers are listed in italics.

† Indicates that they managed in no official matches

- (Netherlands) S. Mobach (1936)
- (Netherlands) Morris Wijngaarde (1946)
- (Netherlands) Wim de Bois (1948)
- (Suriname (Kingdom of the Netherlands)) André Kamperveen (1958–1962)
- (Suriname (Kingdom of the Netherlands)) Humbert Boerleider (1973)
- (Suriname) Ollie Camps (1976)
- (Suriname) Walther Braithwaite (1976–1977)
- (Netherlands) Rob Groener (1978–1979)
- (Suriname) Armand Sahadewsing (1980–1982)
- (Suriname) Walther Braithwaite (1985–1986)
- (Suriname) Paul Bhagwandas (1989–1993)
- (Suriname) Frits Purperhart (1996–1997)
- (Suriname) Ronald Kolf (2000–2001)
- (Uruguay) Edgardo Baldi (2003–2004)
- (Suriname) Andy Atmodimedjo (2004)
- (Suriname) Wensley Bundel (2005)
- (Netherlands) Leo Koswal (2006)
- (Suriname) Kenneth Jaliens (2006–2008)
- (Suriname) Wensley Bundel (2008–2010)
- (Netherlands) Kees Zwamborn (2010)
- (Suriname) Ricardo Winter (2010–2011)
- (Suriname) Kenneth Jaliens (2011–2012)
- (Suriname) Ricardo Winter (2012)
- (Suriname) Roberto Gödeken (2013–2014)
- (Suriname) (Netherlands) Dean Gorré (2015)
- (Suriname) Roberto Gödeken (2016–2017)
- (Suriname) Eugene Verwey (2018)
- (Suriname) (Netherlands) Dean Gorré (2018–2021)
- (Netherlands) (Suriname) Stanley Menzo (2022)
- (Netherlands) (Suriname) Aron Winter (2022–2023)
- (Netherlands) (Suriname) Stanley Menzo (2024–2025)
- (Netherlands) (Suriname) Henk ten Cate (2026)
- (Netherlands) (Suriname) Henk Fraser (2026–)

== Players ==
=== Current squad ===
The following players were called-up for the friendly games against Lithuania on 12 November and Eswatini on 15 November 2026.

Caps and goals correct as of 16 November 2026 after the friendly match against Eswatini.

No.	Pos.	Player	Date of birth (age)	Caps	Goals	Club
	GK	Jahnilo Wiegel	13 March 2005 (age 21)	2	0	(Royal Belgian Football Association) Westerlo
	GK	Sanjeev van Haren	19 January 2008 (age 18)	0	0	(Royal Dutch Football Association) NEC Nijmegen Youth
	GK	Yannick Boerleider	29 December 2009 (age 16)	0	0	(Italian Football Federation) Torino U20
	DF	Shaquille Pinas (second captain)	19 March 1998 (age 28)	39	4	(Saudi Arabian Football Federation) Al-Kholood
	DF	Myenty Abena (captain)	12 December 1994 (age 31)	37	1	(Turkish Football Federation) Gaziantep
	DF	Ridgeciano Haps	12 June 1993 (age 33)	30	2	(Italian Football Federation) Venezia
	DF	Liam van Gelderen	23 March 2001 (age 25)	21	1	(Royal Dutch Football Association) RKC Waalwijk
	DF	Djevencio van der Kust	30 April 2001 (age 25)	17	2	(Royal Dutch Football Association) Heracles Almelo
	DF	Navajo Bakboord	29 January 1999 (age 27)	10	0	(Royal Dutch Football Association) RKC Waalwijk
	DF	Djavan Anderson	21 April 1995 (age 31)	7	0	(Oman Football Association) Al-Nahda
	DF	Neville Ogidi Nwankwo	8 October 2002 (age 24)	1	0	(Royal Dutch Football Association) Utrecht
	DF	Jaden Pinas	28 December 2003 (age 22)	1	0	(Royal Dutch Football Association) Dordrecht
	MF	Kenneth Paal	24 June 1997 (age 29)	27	0	(Turkish Football Federation) Antalyaspor
	MF	Denzel Jubitana	6 May 1999 (age 27)	21	2	(Association of Football Federations of Azerbaijan) Neftçi
	MF	Dhoraso Klas	30 January 2001 (age 25)	20	2	(Moldovan Football Federation) Sheriff Tiraspol
	MF	Justin Lonwijk	21 December 1999 (age 26)	18	5	(Ukrainian Association of Football) Dynamo Kyiv
	MF	Immanuel Pherai	25 April 2001 (age 25)	17	1	(German Football Association) SV Elversberg
	MF	Jayden Turfkruier	25 September 2002 (age 24)	6	0	(Football Association of Finland) VPS
	MF	Shiloh 't Zand	14 May 2003 (age 23)	3	0	(Royal Dutch Football Association) Fortuna Sittard
	FW	Sheraldo Becker	9 February 1995 (age 31)	23	5	(German Football Association) Mainz 05
	FW	Richonell Margaret	7 July 2000 (age 26)	19	4	(Royal Dutch Football Association) Go Ahead Eagles
	FW	Gyrano Kerk	2 December 1995 (age 30)	18	4	(Turkish Football Federation) Erzurumspor
	FW	Jaden Montnor	9 August 2002 (age 24)	17	3	(Cyprus Football Association) Omonia
	FW	Denilho Cleonise	8 December 2001 (age 24)	5	0	(Football Federation of Belarus) Maxline Vitebsk
	FW	Joël Piroe	2 August 1999 (age 27)	3	2	(The Football Association) West Ham United
	FW	Cheveyo Balentien	18 December 2006 (age 19)	1	0	(Italian Football Federation) Milan Futuro
	FW	David Garden	20 June 2004 (age 22)	1	1	(Royal Dutch Football Association) Excelsior

=== Recent call-ups ===
The following players have also been called up to the Suriname squad within the last twelve months.

Pos.	Player	Date of birth (age)	Caps	Goals	Club	Latest call-up
GK	Mannou Berger	15 October 2004 (age 22)	0	0	(Netherlands) Feyenoord	v. Lithuania, 12 November 2026
GK	Etienne Vaessen	26 July 1995 (age 31)	19	0	(Netherlands) Groningen	v. Guatemala, 5 October 2026
GK	Jonathan Fonkel	15 April 2005 (age 21)	0	0	(Suriname) Robinhood	v. Guatemala, 5 October 2026
GK	Warner Hahn	15 June 1992 (age 34)	27	0	(Sweden) Hammarby	v. Bolivia, 26 March 2026
DF	Stefano Denswil (third captain)	7 May 1993 (age 33)	18	0	(Cyprus) AEL Limassol	v. Guatemala, 5 October 2026
DF	Yannick Leliendal	23 April 2002 (age 24)	4	0	(Israel) Hapoel Tel Aviv	v. Guatemala, 5 October 2026
DF	Anfernee Dijksteel	27 October 1996 (age 30)	17	0	(Turkey) Kocaelispor	v. Martinique, 28 September 2026
DF	Radinio Balker	3 September 1998 (age 28)	8	1	(England) Huddersfield Town	v. Martinique, 28 September 2026
MF	Melayro Bogarde	28 May 2002 (age 24)	1	0	(Austria) LASK	v. Honduras, 25 September 2026 ^{PRE}
MF	Tjaronn Chery	4 June 1988 (age 38)	10	1	(Netherlands) NEC	v. Bolivia, 26 March 2026
MF	Jean-Paul Boëtius	22 March 1994 (age 32)	9	0	(Netherlands) RKC Waalwijk	v. Bolivia, 26 March 2026
FW	Gleofilo Vlijter	17 September 1999 (age 27)	37	15	(Hungary) Újpest	v. Guatemala, 5 October 2026
FW	Djenairo Daniels	7 January 2002 (age 24)	3	0	(Scotland) Kilmarnock	v. Guatemala, 5 October 2026
FW	Ché Nunnely	4 February 1999 (age 27)	2	0	(Poland) Radomiak Radom	v. Guatemala, 5 October 2026
FW	Tyrone Conraad	7 April 1997 (age 29)	3	2	(China) Shijiazhuang Gongfu	v. Honduras, 25 September 2026 ^{PRE}
FW	Jay-Roy Grot	13 March 1998 (age 28)	3	0	(Denmark) OB	v. Honduras, 25 September 2026 ^{PRE}
^{INJ} Withdrew due to injury^{PRE} Preliminary/Standby squad^{RET} Retired from the national team^{SUS} Serving suspension^{WD} Player withdrew from the squad due to non-injury issue.

== Player records ==
As of 15 November 2026
Players in bold are still active with Suriname.

=== Most appearances ===
Rank	Player	Caps	Goals	Career
1	Marlon Felter	48	6	2004–2011
2	**Shaquille Pinas**	39	4	2021–present
3	**Gleofilo Vlijter**	37	15	2015–present
4	**Myenty Abena**	36	1	2021–present
4	Stefano Rijssel	36	14	2010–2019
6	Clifton Sandvliet	33	12	2000–2008
7	Dion Malone	32	0	2021–2026
8	Dimitrie Apai	30	5	2013–2022
8	Sergino Eduard	30	1	2013–2022
10	**Ridgeciano Haps**	29	2	2021–
10	Germaine van Dijk	29	1	2006–2011

=== Top goalscorers ===
Rank	Player	Goals	Caps	Ratio	Career
1	**Gleofilo Vlijter**	15	37	0.42	2015–present
2	Stefano Rijssel	14	36	0.39	2010–2019
3	Clifton Sandvliet	12	33	0.36	2000–2008
4	Nigel Hasselbaink	8	9	0.89	2019–2021
4	Benny Kejansi	8	13	0.62	1996–2002
4	Ivenzo Comvalius	8	19	0.42	2018–2022
4	Wensley Christoph	8	25	0.32	2004–2010
8	Marlon Felter	6	48	0.13	2004–2011
9	Giovanni Drenthe	5	17	0.29	2009–2012
9	Gordon Kinsaini	5	17	0.29	2001–2009
9	**Justin Lonwijk**	5	18	0.28	2024–
9	**Sheraldo Becker**	5	23	0.22	2021–present
9	Dimitrie Apai	5	30	0.17	2013–2022

== Competitive record ==
=== FIFA World Cup ===
FIFA World Cup									Qualification					
Year	Round	Position	Pld	W	D*	L	GF	GA	Pld	W	D	L	GF	GA
as (Surinam (Dutch colony)) / Dutch Guyana									as (Surinam (Dutch colony)) / Dutch Guyana					
1930 and 1934	Did not enter								Declined participation					
(France) 1938	Withdrew								Withdrew					
1950 to 1958	Did not enter								Declined participation					
(Chile) 1962	Did not qualify								2	0	1	1	1	2
(England) 1966	Did not qualify								4	1	0	3	8	9
(Mexico) 1970	Did not qualify								4	2	0	2	10	9
(West Germany) 1974	Did not qualify								4	2	1	1	11	4
as Suriname									as Suriname					
(Argentina) 1978	Did not qualify								10	2	2	6	15	24
(Spain) 1982	Did not qualify								4	2	1	1	5	3
(Mexico) 1986	Did not qualify								6	1	2	3	4	10
(Italy) 1990	Withdrew								Withdrew					
(United States) 1994	Did not qualify								4	1	2	1	4	4
(France) 1998	Did not qualify								2	0	0	2	0	2
(South Korea) (Japan) 2002	Did not qualify								4	1	1	2	1	2
(Germany) 2006	Did not qualify								4	2	1	1	12	6
(South Africa) 2010	Did not qualify								9	3	2	4	14	21
(Brazil) 2014	Did not qualify								6	2	1	3	5	11
(Russia) 2018	Did not qualify								2	0	0	2	1	4
(Qatar) 2022	Did not qualify								4	3	0	1	15	4
(Canada) (Mexico) (United States) 2026	Did not qualify								11	5	4	2	20	10
(Morocco) (Portugal) (Spain) 2030	To be determined								To be determined					
(Saudi Arabia) 2034	To be determined								To be determined					
Total		0/23							80	27	18	35	126	125

=== CONCACAF Gold Cup ===
CONCACAF Championship & Gold Cup record										Qualification record					
Year	Round	Position	Pld	W	D*	L	GF	GA	Squad	Pld	W	D	L	GF	GA
(El Salvador) 1963	Did not enter									Did not enter					
(Guatemala) 1965	Did not enter									Did not enter					
(Honduras) 1967	Did not enter									Did not enter					
(Costa Rica) 1969	Did not enter									Did not enter					
(Trinidad and Tobago) 1971	Withdrew									Withdrew					
(Haiti) 1973	Did not qualify									4	2	1	1	11	4
(Mexico) 1977	Sixth place	6th	5	0	0	5	6	17	Squad	2	1	0	1	3	2
(Honduras) 1981	Did not qualify									4	2	1	1	5	3
1985	Group stage	9th	4	0	1	3	2	9	Squad	2	1	1	0	2	1
1989	Did not enter									Did not enter					
(United States) 1991	Did not qualify									2	1	1	0	2	1
(United States) (Mexico) 1993	Withdrew									Withdrew					
(United States) 1996	Did not qualify									3	1	1	1	3	6
(United States) 1998	Did not enter									Did not enter					
(United States) 2000	Did not qualify									2	0	2	0	1	1
(United States) 2002	Did not qualify									6	2	2	2	14	12
(United States) (Mexico) 2003	Withdrew									Withdrew					
(United States) 2005	Did not qualify									3	0	2	1	3	4
(United States) 2007	Did not qualify									6	2	1	3	4	10
(United States) 2009	Did not qualify									5	2	1	2	6	6
(United States) 2011	Did not qualify									6	3	1	2	13	9
(United States) 2013	Did not qualify									6	3	1	2	14	11
(Canada) (United States) 2015	Did not qualify									3	0	2	1	3	4
(United States) 2017	Did not qualify									8	3	1	4	12	12
(United States) (Costa Rica) (Jamaica) 2019	Did not qualify									4	2	1	1	8	2
(United States) 2021	Group stage	10th	3	1	0	2	3	5	Squad	6	4	1	1	16	5
(Canada) (United States) 2023	Did not qualify									5	0	2	3	2	9
(Canada) (United States) 2025	Group stage	14th	3	0	1	2	3	6	Squad	6	4	1	1	11	4
Total	Sixth place	4/28	15	1	2	12	14	37	—	83	33	23	27	133	106

CONCACAF Championship & Gold Cup history
First match	Guatemala 3–2 Suriname (8 October 1977; Monterrey, Mexico)
Biggest win	Suriname 2–1 Guadeloupe (20 July 2021; Houston, United States)
Biggest defeat	Mexico 8–1 Suriname (15 October 1977; Monterrey, Mexico)
Best result	6th place in 1977
Worst result	Group stage in 1985, 2021, 2025

=== CONCACAF Nations League ===
CONCACAF Nations League record
League / Quarter-finals											Finals								
Season	Division	Group	Pld	W	D	L	GF	GA	P/R		Finals	Result	Pld	W	D	L	GF	GA	Squad
2019–20	B	D	6	4	1	1	16	5	▲		(United States) 2021	Ineligible							
2022–23	A	A	4	0	1	3	2	9	Same position		(United States) 2023	Did not qualify							
2023–24	A	B	4	1	2	1	6	3	Same position		(United States) 2024	Did not qualify							
2024–25	A	A	6	2	1	3	9	8	Same position		(United States) 2025	Did not qualify							
2026–27	A	B	4	2	1	1	5	4			(United States) 2027								
Total	—	—	24	9	6	9	38	29	—	Total	0 Titles	—	—	—	—	—	—	—	

CONCACAF Nations League history
First match	Dominica 1–2 Suriname (5 September 2019; Roseau, Dominica)
Biggest win	Suriname 6–0 Nicaragua (8 September 2019; Paramaribo, Suriname)
Biggest defeat	Mexico 3–0 Suriname (11 June 2022; Torreón, Mexico); Canada 3–0 Suriname (19 November 2024; Toronto, Canada)
Best result	—
Worst result	—

=== CFU Caribbean Cup ===
CFU Championship & Caribbean Cup								Qualification					
Year	Round	Pld	W	D (Note: Draws include knockout matches decided on a penalty shootout.)	L	GF	GA	Pld	W	D	L	GF	GA
(Trinidad and Tobago) 1978	Champions	3	3	0	0	8	0	4	4	0	0	9	1
(Suriname) 1979	Runners-up	3	1	0	2	5	4	Qualified as host					
(Puerto Rico) 1981	Did not qualify							7	2	2	3	12	13
(French Guiana) 1983	Did not qualify							2	0	1	1	0	1
(Barbados) 1985	Fourth place	3	0	2	1	2	4	4	3	0	1	3	1
(Martinique) 1988	Did not qualify							2	1	1	0	2	1
(Barbados) 1989	Did not enter							Did not enter					
(Trinidad and Tobago) 1990	Did not qualify							3	1	1	1	7	4
(Jamaica) 1991	Did not qualify							2	1	1	0	2	1
(Trinidad and Tobago) 1992	Group stage	3	0	1	2	2	6	3	3	0	0	12	2
(Jamaica) 1993	Did not enter							Did not enter					
(Trinidad and Tobago) 1994	Fourth place	5	1	1	2	5	8	2	2	0	0	4	0
(Cayman Islands) (Jamaica) 1995	Did not qualify							3	1	1	1	3	6
(Trinidad and Tobago) 1996	Fourth place	5	1	1	2	5	9	4	2	1	1	6	5
(Antigua and Barbuda) (Saint Kitts and Nevis) 1997	Did not enter							Did not enter					
(Trinidad and Tobago) (Jamaica) 1998	Did not qualify							3	0	3	0	8	8
(Trinidad and Tobago) 1999	Did not qualify							2	0	2	0	1	1
(Trinidad and Tobago) 2001	Group stage	3	0	1	2	4	9	3	2	1	0	10	3
(Trinidad and Tobago) 2005	Did not qualify							3	0	2	1	3	4
(Trinidad and Tobago) 2007	Did not qualify							6	2	1	3	4	10
(Jamaica) 2008	Did not enter							Did not enter					
(Martinique) 2010	Did not qualify							6	3	1	2	13	9
(Antigua and Barbuda) 2012	Did not qualify							6	3	1	2	14	11
(Jamaica) 2014	Did not qualify							3	0	2	1	3	4
(Martinique) 2017	Did not qualify							8	3	1	4	12	12
Total	1 Title	25	6	6	11	31	40	53	47	26	17	95	103

=== CCCF Championship ===
CCCF Championship
Year	Round	Pld	W	D*	L	GF	GA
1941 to 1957	Did not enter						
(Cuba) 1960	Fourth place	4	1	1	2	4	5
1961	Did not enter						
Total	4th place	4	1	1	2	4	5

=== Pan American Games ===
Pan American Games
Year	Round	GP	W	D*	L	GS	GA
1951 to 1987	Did not enter						
(Cuba) 1991	Group stage	3	1	1	1	4	3
1995 to 2019	Did not enter						
Total	Group stage	3	1	1	1	4	3

=== ABCS Tournament ===
ABCS Tournament
Year	Result	GP	W	D*	L	GS	GA
(Curaçao) 2010	Champions	2	1	1	0	6	4
(Suriname) 2011	Third place	2	1	1	0	2	0
(Aruba) 2012	Runners-up	2	1	0	1	8	1
(Curaçao) 2013	Champions	2	2	0	0	5	1
(Suriname) 2015	Champions	2	2	0	0	4	0
(Curaçao) 2021	Did not enter						
(Curaçao) 2022	Runners-up	2	1	1	0	6	3
Total	Champions	12	8	3	1	31	9

*Draws include knockout matches decided on penalty kicks.

== All-time record against other nations ==
As of 15 November 2026.

Team	Pld	W	D	L
Anguilla	1	1	0	0
Antigua and Barbuda	5	3	1	1
Aruba	14	8	4	2
Barbados	6	1	3	2
Bermuda	2	1	0	1
Bolivia	1	0	0	1
Brazil	1	0	0	1
British Virgin Islands	1	1	0	0
Canada	4	0	0	4
Cayman Islands	2	2	0	0
China	1	0	0	1
Costa Rica	9	0	1	8
Cuba	14	1	2	11
Curaçao (Note: Includes matches against the Netherlands Antilles.)	30	10	7	13
Denmark	1	1	0	0
Dominica	4	3	1	0
Dominican Republic	3	0	2	1
El Salvador	10	3	1	6
Eswatini	1	1	0	0
Trinidad and Tobago	26	8	6	12
Guyana	23	15	3	5
Martinique	18	4	7	7
French Guiana	13	7	3	3
Guadeloupe	12	6	0	6
Haiti	11	3	5	3
Jamaica	9	2	1	6
Grenada	7	3	3	1
Guatemala	9	0	4	5
Honduras	4	1	2	1
Panama	6	2	3	1
India	2	2	0	0
Saint Kitts and Nevis	4	1	1	2
Lithuania	1	0	1	0
Saint Lucia	2	1	0	1
Nicaragua	7	5	0	2
East Germany	1	0	0	1
United States	1	1	0	0
Netherlands	1	0	0	1
Mexico	4	0	0	4
Montserrat	3	3	0	0
Colombia	1	0	1	0
Puerto Rico	3	1	2	0
Saint Vincent and the Grenadines	7	3	2	2
Thailand	1	0	0	1
Total	288	106	66	116

== Team records ==
=== Wins ===
Largest win

- 9–0 vs French Guiana on 2 March 1947

Largest win at the CONCACAF Championship finals
none
Largest win at the CCCF Championship finals

- 2–0 vs Cuba on 18 February 1960, 1960 CCCF Championship

Largest win at the CFU Championship finals

- 4–0 vs Antigua and Barbuda on 22 October 1978, 1978 CFU Championship

Largest win at the Caribbean Cup finals

- 3–1 vs Jamaica on 28 May 1996, 1996 Caribbean Cup

Largest win at the Pan American Games

- 3–1 vs Canada on 6 August 1991, 1991 Pan American Games

Largest win at the CONCACAF Nations League

- 6–0 vs Nicaragua on 8 September 2019, 2019–20 CONCACAF Nations League

Largest win at the ABCS Tournament

- 8–0 vs Bonaire on 13 July 2012, ABCS Tournament 2012

=== Draws ===
Highest scoring draw

- 3–3 vs Aruba on 29 August 1953
- 3–3 vs Netherlands Antilles on 2 March 1998
- 3–3 vs Cuba on 12 November 2010

Highest scoring draw at the CONCACAF Championship finals

- 1–1 vs Honduras on 23 March 1985, 1985 CONCACAF Championship

Highest scoring draw at the CCCF Championship finals

- 1–1 vs Honduras on 15 February 1960, 1960 CCCF Championship

Highest scoring draw at the CFU Championship finals

- 2–2 vs Guadeloupe on 29 June 1985, 1985 CFU Championship

Highest scoring draw at the Caribbean Cup finals

- 1–1 vs Antigua and Barbuda on 16 June 1992, 1992 Caribbean Cup
- 1–1 vs Saint Kitts and Nevis on 30 May 1996, 1996 Caribbean Cup
- 1–1 vs Haiti on 18 May 2001, 2001 Caribbean Cup

Highest scoring draw at the Pan American Games

- 1–1 vs Honduras on 8 August 1991, 1991 Pan American Games

Highest scoring draw at the ABCS Tournament

- n/a^{1}

1. Tournament follows a knock-out format, and matches cannot end on a draw.

=== Defeats ===
Largest defeat

- 9–2 vs Netherlands on 30 July 1958
- 8–1 vs Aruba on 6 June 1946
- 8–1 vs Mexico on 15 October 1977

Including unofficial games: 8–1 vs Feyenoord on 13 June 1946
Largest defeat at the CONCACAF Championship finals
8–1 vs Mexico on 15 October 1977, 1977 CONCACAF Championship
Largest defeat at the CCCF Championship finals

- 3–1 vs Costa Rica on 17 February 1960, 1960 CCCF Championship

Largest defeat at the CFU Championship finals

- 3–1 vs French Guiana on 21 June 1981, 1981 CFU Championship

Largest defeat at the Caribbean Cup finals

- 4–0 vs Saint Kitts and Nevis on 20 May 2001, 2001 Caribbean Cup

Largest defeat at the Pan American Games

- 1–0 vs United States on 4 August 1991, 1991 Pan American Games

Largest defeat at the ABCS Tournament

- 1–0 vs Aruba on 15 July 2012, ABCS Tournament 2012

== Honours ==
=== Subcontinental / Regional ===
- CFU Championship
  - (gold) Champions (1): 1978
  - (bronze) Third place (1): 1979

=== Friendly / Unofficial ===
- ABCS Tournament (3): 2010, 2013, 2015
- Betty Brown Challenge Cup (1): 1943

== See also ==
- Football in Suriname
- Surinamese Football Association
- Suriname national under-20 football team
- Suriname national under-17 football team
- Suriname Major League
