= Johannes van den Bosch =

Dutch officer and politician (1780–1844)

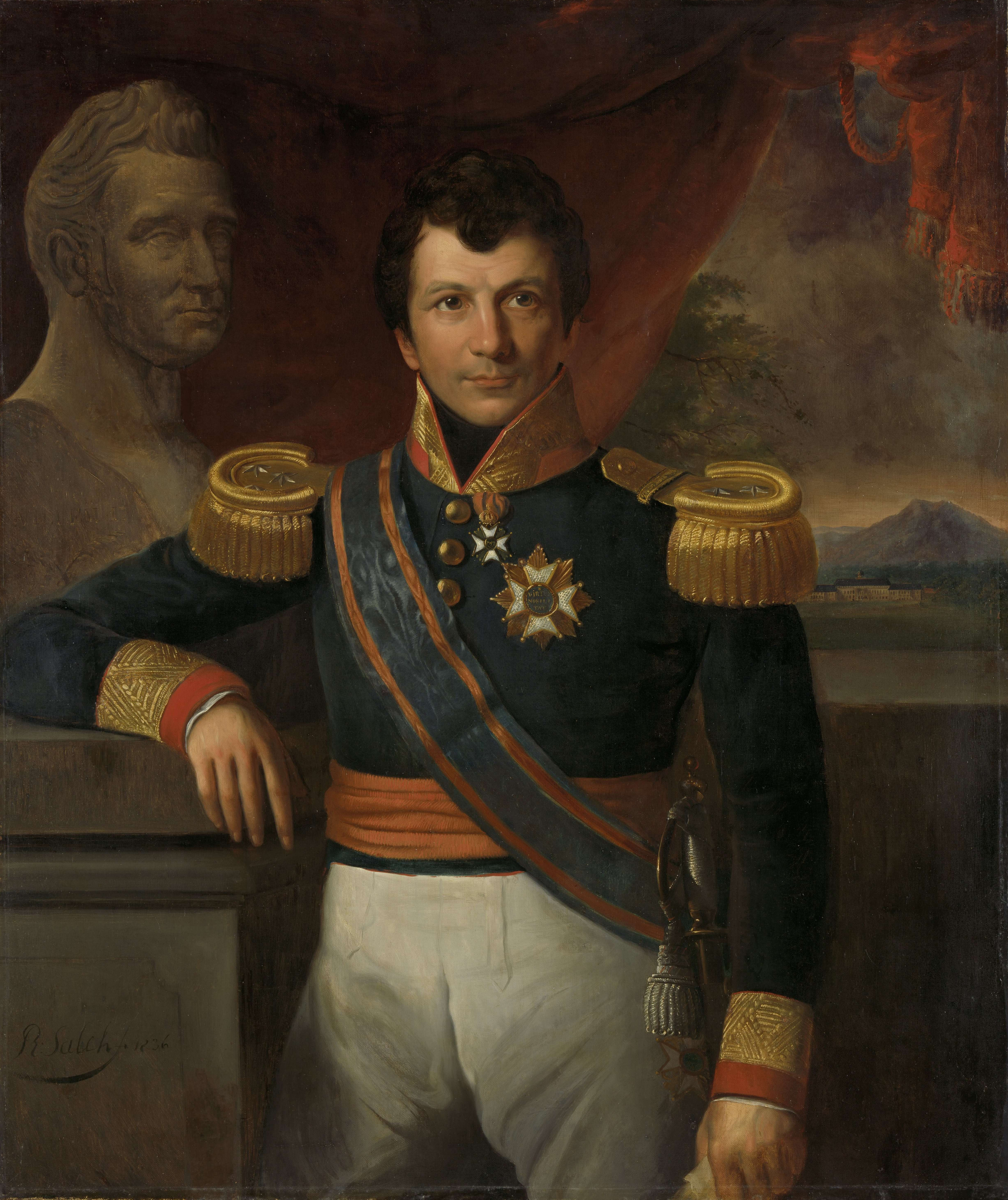
- Portrait by Raden Saleh, 1836

Member of the House of Representatives
- In office 7 November 1842 – 28 January 1844
- Monarch: William II

Minister of Colonial Affairs
- In office 30 May 1834 – 1 January 1840
- Monarch: William I
- Preceded by: Arnoldus Brocx
- Succeeded by: Jean Chrétien Baud

Governor-General of the Dutch East Indies
- In office 16 January 1830 – 2 July 1833
- Monarch: William I
- Preceded by: Leonard du Bus de Gisignies; Hendrik Merkus de Kock
- Succeeded by: Jean Chrétien Baud

Commissioner-General of Suriname
- In office 12 October 1827 – 1 August 1828
- Monarch: William I
- Preceded by: Abraham de Veer
- Succeeded by: Paulus Cantz'laar (as Governor of the Dutch West Indies)

Personal details
- Born: 2 February 1780 Herwijnen, Dutch Republic
- Died: 28 January 1844 (aged 63) The Hague, Netherlands

Military service
- Allegiance: Batavian Republic; Netherlands; Dutch East Indies
- Branch/service: Batavian Army; Dutch East Indies Army
- Rank: Lieutenant general
- Awards: Military William Order

Johannes, Count van den Bosch (2 February 1780 – 28 January 1844) was a Dutch officer and politician. He was Governor-General of the Dutch East Indies (1830–1833), commander of the Royal Netherlands East Indies Army, Minister of Colonies, and Minister of State. He was an officer in the Military William Order.

== Biography ==
Johannes van den Bosch was born on 2 February 1780 in Herwijnen in the Dutch Republic (the present-day Netherlands), to the physician Johannes van den Bosch Sr. and his wife Adriana Poningh.

Van den Bosch enrolled in the army of the Batavian Republic in 1797 and was, at his own request, sent to Batavia in the Dutch East Indies as a lieutenant a year later. At the time, the emphasis was put on asserting commercial interest, and Dutch control over the Indonesian archipelago was limited. As an adjutant, Van den Bosch remained close to the consecutive Governor-Generals, and was involved in the transformation from trade colonialism to territorial colonial expansion. In 1808, he had a conflict with the new Governor-General, Herman Willem Daendels, after which he was honourably discharged from service at the rank of colonel. He and his family were sent back to Europe in 1810.

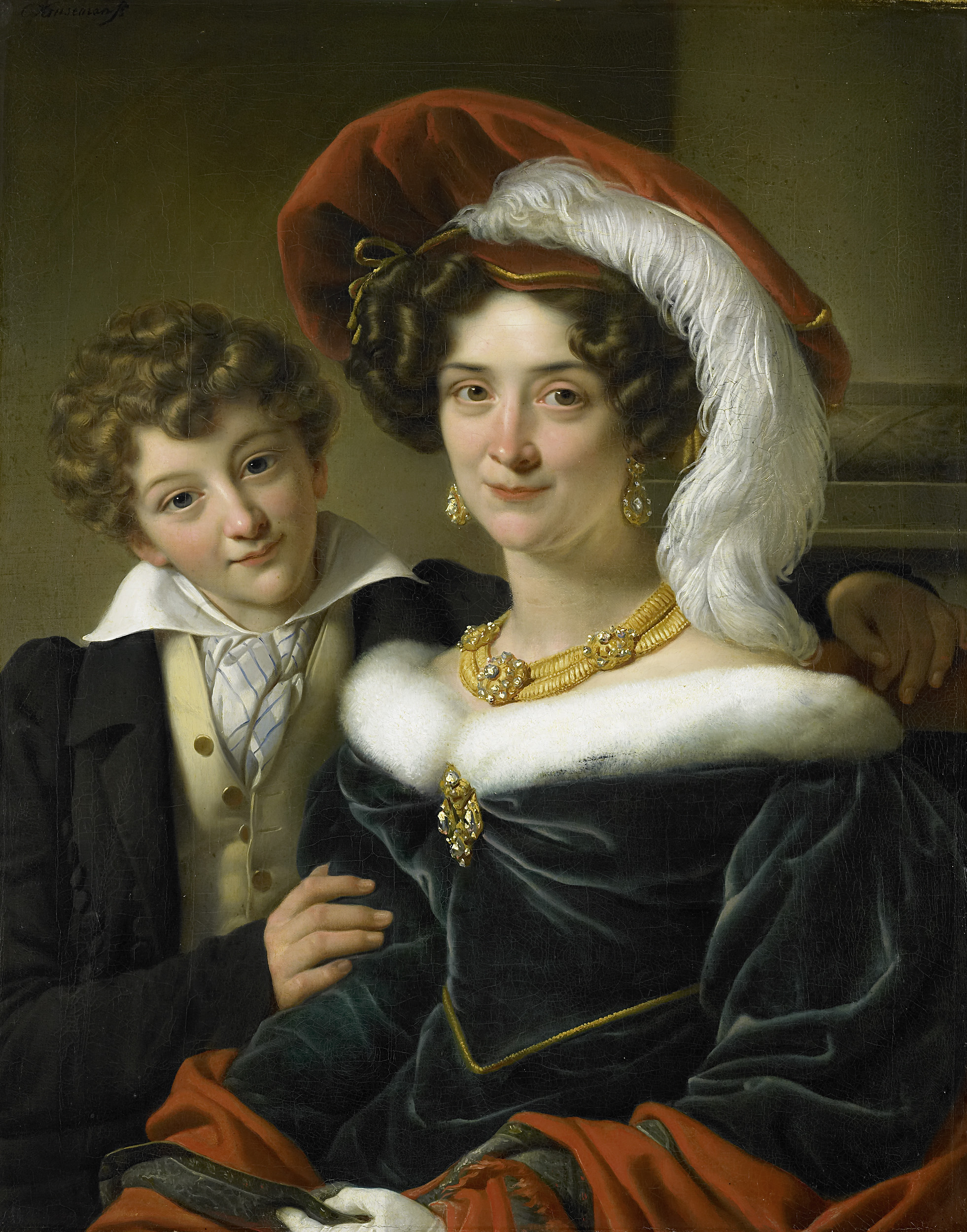
Second wife and son of Count van den Bosch by Cornelis Kruseman.

On his way back to the Netherlands, Van den Bosch was captured by the British and remained a captive until 1812. Upon arriving in the Netherlands, he joined the provisional government tasked with restoring the authority of the Prince of Orange, William Frederick. He was recommissioned in the army as a colonel and, in the name of the Prince of Orange, captured Utrecht and Naarden. In 1818, Van den Bosch was involved in the establishment of the Society of Humanitarianism, under the auspices of Prince Frederick, and was put on inactive in the military in order to focus on the society. The society considered labour to be the only means to combat poverty. In Drenthe, it founded the 'free colonies' of Frederiksoord, Willemsoord and Wilhelminaoord, where the poor from big cities would learn to care for themselves in a disciplined manner.

In 1827, Van den Bosch was tasked with restoring Dutch control over the West Indies as commissioner-general. He left the society and arrived on Curaçao in December that year, and would stay in the colony for eight months. During this period, he took several initiatives concerning trade and banking, focussed on stimulating economic activity and scope of the colony. Among other things, he introduced a regulation which would make the Constitution of the Netherlands apply to the colony as well, and used it to attempt to improve the living conditions of slaves. Only shortly after his return in 1828, Van den Bosch rose to the rank of lieutenant general and was appointed Governor-General of the Dutch East Indies. In this capacity, he is most famous for the introduction of the cultivation system in 1830. This system forced Javanese farmers to use a fifth of their farmland for export goods such as coffee, sugar and indigo.

Van den Bosch returned to the Netherlands on 18 May 1834 and was appointed Minister of Colonies on 30 May. As Minister, he demanded increasingly high financial results from the colonies, often to the detriment of the interest of individual farmers and slaves. In 1839, he received criticism from the House of Representatives for the opaqueness of his policy on loans between the government and the Netherlands Trading Society. Van den Bosch voluntarily stepped down from office on 1 January 1840, upon which he was granted the title Count van den Bosch by royal decree, as well as the honourable title of Minister of State. He entered the House of Representatives for South Holland in 1842 and would remain there until his death.

Count van den Bosch died on 28 January 1844 at his estate in The Hague, as a result of a short disease.

== Titles ==
- 17 June 1835: elevated into the Dutch nobility with the title of Baron
- 25 December 1839: created Count (Dutch: Graaf)

== See also ==
- Landrentestelsel
- Frederiksoord
- Society of Humanitarianism

Political offices
Preceded by Arnoldus Brocx	Minister of Colonial Affairs; 1834–1840	Succeeded by Jean Chrétien Baud
Preceded by Leonard du Bus de Gisignies; Hendrik Merkus de Kock	Governor-General of the Dutch East Indies; 1830–1833	Succeeded by Jean Chrétien Baud
Preceded by Abraham de Veer	Commissioner-General of Suriname; 1827–1828	Succeeded by Paulus Roelof Cantz'laar as Governor of the Dutch West Indies
Dutch nobility
New creation	Count van den Bosch; 1839–1844	Succeeded by Johannes Hendrik van den Bosch
