= Abraham Ellis =

Abraham Ellis may refer to:

- Abe Ellis, a Stargate Atlantis character
- Abraham George Ellis (1846–1916), Dutch admiral and politician
