= Charles Bentinck =

Charles Bentinck may refer to:

- Charles Cavendish-Bentinck (1817–1865), Church of England clergyman
- Charles Ferdinand Bentinck (1764–1811), Dutch-born British colonial governor
- Lord Charles Bentinck (1780–1826), British aristocrat, father of Charles Cavendish-Bentinck
- Charles Henry Bentinck (1879–1955), British diplomat and Anglican priest
- Lady Charles Bentinck (1788–1875), British aristocrat, mother of Charles Cavendish-Bentinck
