= Portrait of a Married Couple in Suriname =

Daguerreotype

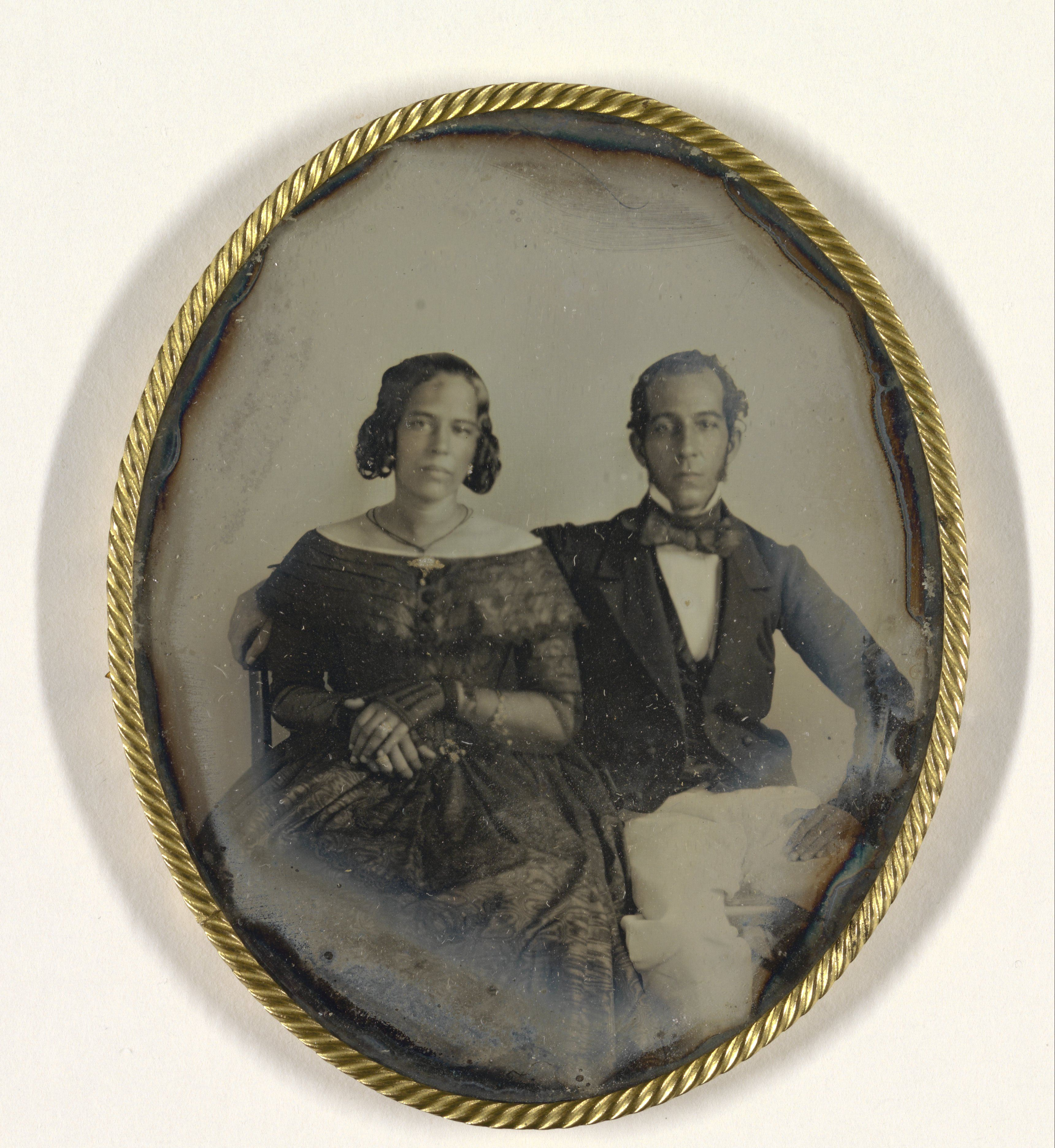
Portrait of a married couple in Suriname (c. 1846)

Portrait of a Married Couple in Suriname or Portrait of the Married Couple Johannes Ellis and Maria Louisa de Hart is a daguerreotype from probably 1846. It is the oldest known surviving photograph from Suriname.

The picture shows the 33-year-old Johannes Ellis, extramarital son of the Dutchman Abraham de Veer and Fanny Ellis, and his 19-year-old Surinamese wife Maria Louisa de Hart, a wealthy couple, dressed according to the latest fashion. De Hart was a daughter of the Jewish merchant Mozes Meijer de Hart, who came from Amsterdam, and a slave girl who was bought free by him in 1827. At the time the daguerreotype was made Maria Louisa was pregnant with her son, the first minister of Surinamese descent in a Dutch cabinet: Abraham George Ellis.

According to family tradition, the portrait dates from 1845, the year of their engagement and marriage, but it was probably made in Paramaribo in the spring of 1846 when the American daguerreotypes John L. Riker and Warren Thompson independently visited the north coast of South America.

The original print of the photograph was on a long-term loan from Mrs. J. Huisken to the Rijksmuseum in Amsterdam in 2009.
