= Abraham de Veer =

Dutch colonial administrator (1767–1838)

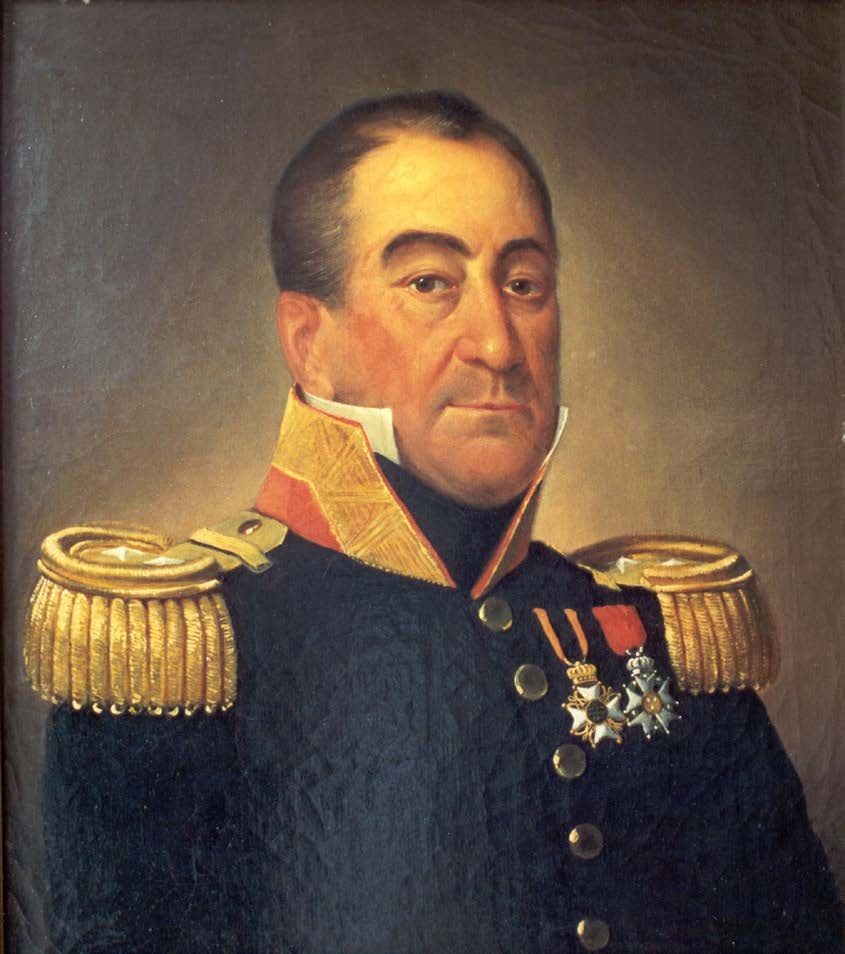

Governor of Suriname
- In office 1 April 1822 – 12 October 1827
- Monarch: William I of the Netherlands
- Preceded by: Cornelis Reinhard Vaillant
- Succeeded by: Johannes van den Bosch

Governor of Sint Eustatius, Saba and Sint Maarten
- In office 1817–1822
- Monarch: William I of the Netherlands
- Preceded by: Reinier 't Hoen
- Succeeded by: Diederik Johannes van Romondt

Commandant General of the Dutch Gold Coast
- In office 5 March 1810 – 11 March 1816
- Monarch: Louis Bonaparte
- Preceded by: Jan Frederik König
- Succeeded by: Herman Willem Daendels

Governor of Curaçao
- ad interim
- In office 1803–1804 Serving with Cornelis Berch
- Preceded by: Johann Rudolf Lauffer
- Succeeded by: Pierre Jean Changuion

Personal details
- Born: 8 January 1767 Curaçao
- Died: 1 February 1838 (aged 71) Paramaribo, Suriname

Abraham de Veer (born 8 January 1767 – 1 February 1838) was a Dutch colonial administrator, who served as governor of Curaçao (1803–1804); the Dutch Gold Coast (1810–1816); Sint Eustatius, Saba and Sint Maarten (1817–1822); and Suriname (1822–1827).

== Biography ==
Abraham de Veer was born on Curaçao to governor Johannes de Veer and Gijsbertha Vos. After making a career in the colonial government of Curaçao, he was, together with Cornelis Berch, given temporary civilian control over the island after it had been returned to the Dutch due to the Peace of Amiens. He resumed his work in the colonial administration after the new governor Pierre Jean Changuion arrived.

When the British occupied Curaçao again in 1807, De Veer refused to continue his duties under British occupation and moved to the Netherlands. While in the Netherlands, he was appointed governor of the Dutch Gold Coast by King Louis Napoleon of Holland. He was captured on his way to the Gold Coast by the British and eventually exchanged for a British prisoner in 1809. When he arrived on the Gold Coast in early 1810, the siege of Elmina that had started under his predecessor Jan Frederik König had not yet been lifted. De Veer was installed as commandant-general on 5 March 1810.

De Veer would remain in charge over the Gold Coast until Herman Willem Daendels replaced him in 1816. After returning to the Netherlands, De Veer was appointed Governor of Sint Eustatius, Saba and Sint Maarten in 1817. In 1822, De Veer became Governor of Suriname. When Johannes van den Bosch arrived in Suriname in April 1828 to reorganize the Dutch possessions in the West, he did not deem De Veer capable enough to govern the newly united colony of the Dutch West Indies, comprising Suriname and the Dutch Antilles. Instead, Paulus Roelof Cantz'laar was installed as the first governor of the Dutch West Indies.

De Veer was honourably discharged from his duties and retired in Suriname. He died in Paramaribo on 1 February 1838.

== Personal life ==
Abraham de Veer married Dorothea Elisabeth van Uytrecht on 27 May 1787. She was the daughter of Caspar Lodewijk van Uytrecht and Poulina Ellis. With her, he had one daughter and three sons. After Dorothea's death in 1793, Abraham married Aletta Schotborgh on 9 April 1797. With Aletta he had four daughters and four sons.

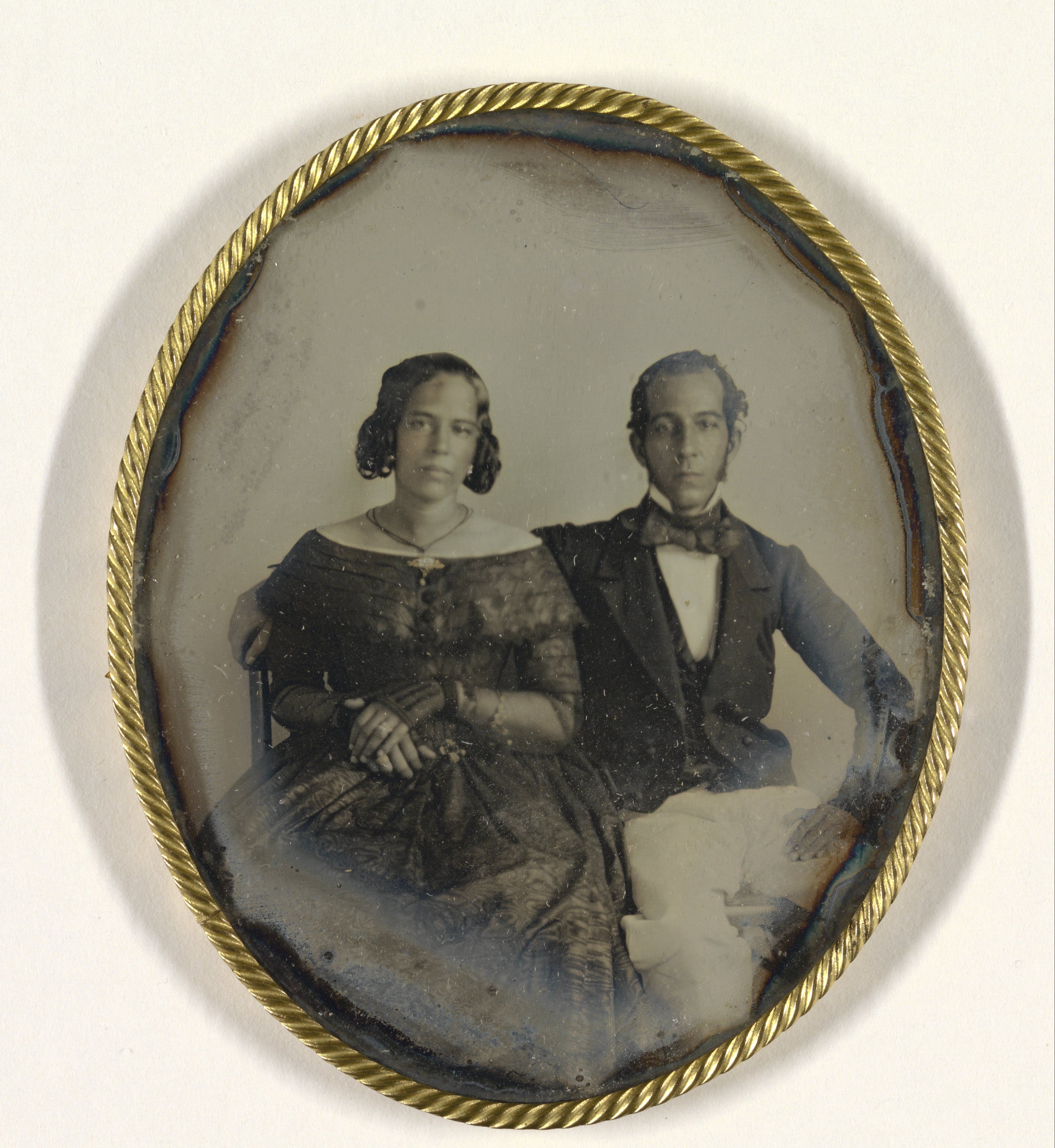
The daguerreotype of Abraham's son Johannes Ellis and his wife Mary Louise Hart is the oldest known daguerreotype of Suriname.

During his governorship on the Dutch Gold Coast, Abraham de Veer fathered a son with the local Euro-African Fanny, named Johannes. He gave him the surname of his mother-in-law: Ellis. Abraham de Veer took Johannes Ellis with him to Sint Eustatius and Suriname. A daguerreotype of Johannes Ellis and his wife Mary Louise Hart from 1846 is the oldest known daguerreotype of Suriname. Johannes Ellis was the father of Dutch Minister of the Navy Abraham George Ellis.
