= Port of Willemstad =

Willemstad
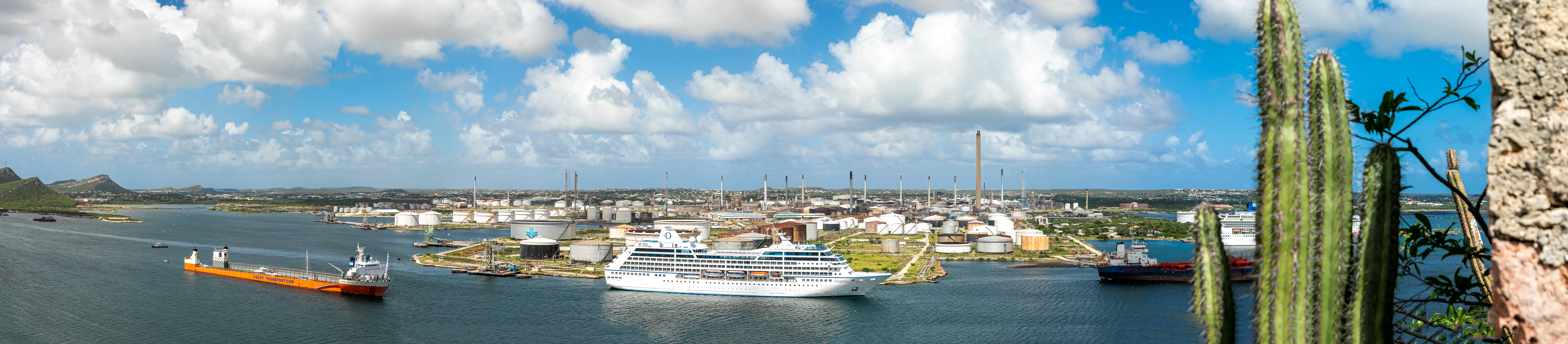
- Isla Oil Refinery in Port of Willemstad photographed from Fort Nassau
- Interactive map of Willemstad

Location
- Country: Curaçao
- Location: Caribbean
- Coordinates: 12°05′N 68°55′W
- UN/LOCODE: CWWIL

Details
- No. of berths: 35
- Draft depth: 24.0 metres (78.7 ft)

Statistics
- Website; Official website

The Port of Willemstad is the main port facility on the island of Curaçao, located on the east coast of the island.

A multipurpose port, Willemstad handles cruise ships, breakbulk and containers, and has a large tanker facility at Emmastad. It also has four drydock facilities, the largest of which can handle vessels 280 m. in length.

== History ==
Owing to its location near the Venezuelan oilfields, its political stability and its natural deep water harbour, Willemstad became the site of an important seaport and refinery. Willemstad's harbour is one of the largest oil handling ports in the Caribbean. The refinery, at one point the largest in the world, was originally built and owned by Royal Dutch Shell in 1915.

The four companies comprising the Royal Dutch Shell refining operation, the actual refinery, oil bunkering, the tugboat company (KTK) and the local distribution of refined products (CurOli/Gas), were each sold to the government of Curaçao in 1985 for the symbolic sum of one guilder per company, a total of 4 guilders, and is now leased to PDVSA, the state owned Venezuelan oil company. Schlumberger, the world's largest oil field services company is incorporated in Willemstad.

== Port layout ==
The port consists of two main areas - Sint Anna Baai and Schottegat - which together form one of the best harbours in the West Indies.
