= Willem Huender =

Dutch colonial administrator and diplomat (1900-1963)

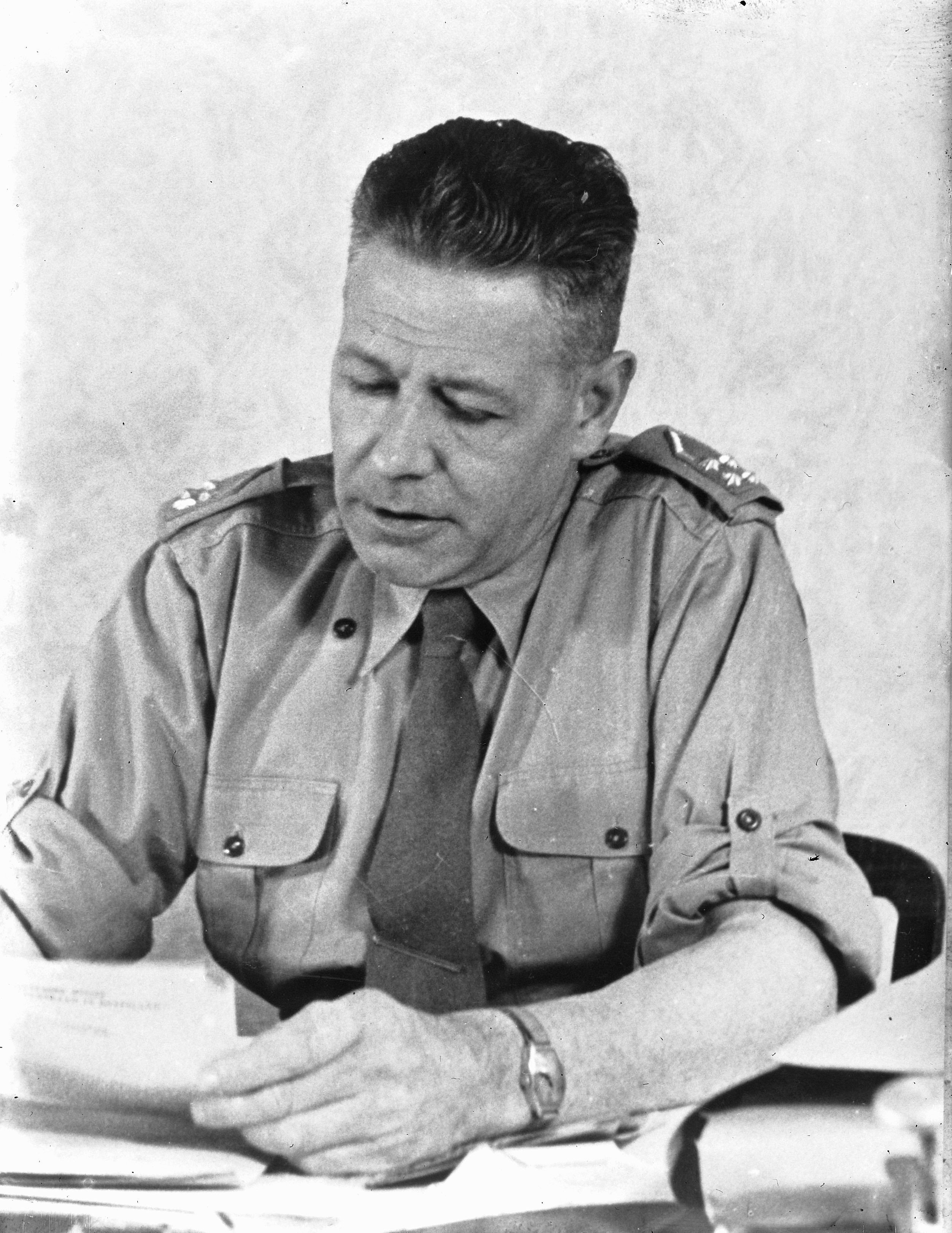

Governor-General of Suriname
- In office 2 August 1948 – 2 December 1949
- Preceded by: Johannes Cornelis Brons
- Succeeded by: Jan Klaasesz

Personal details
- Born: 30 May 1900 Amsterdam, Netherlands
- Died: 7 August 1963 (aged 63) Bad Ems, Germany

Willem Huender (30 May 1900 – 7 August 1963) was a Dutch colonial administrator and diplomat, who was Governor of Suriname between 1948 and 1949. Huender submitted his resignation after serving only one year as governor, citing health reasons.
