= Van den Bosch family =

Dutch noble family

van den Bosch
- noble family
- Country: Netherlands
- Founded: 18th century
- Founder: Arij van den Bosch
- Titles: count

Van den Bosch is the name of family belonging to the Dutch nobility.

Oldest known ancestor of this family is one Arij van den Bosch who lived in Utrecht in 1701. The title of count was created in 1839, when Johannes van den Bosch, Governor-General of the Dutch East Indies, was elevated to the title of Count.

== List of Counts ==
- Johannes Hendrik van den Bosch (1844–1854)
- Johannes Hendrik Willem van den Bosch (1854–1902)
- Johannes Hendrik Otto van den Bosch (1902–1940)
- Johannes Hendrik Otto van den Bosch (1940–1994)
- Johannes Hendrik Otto van den Bosch (1994–)
