= Archibald Currie (Surinamese politician) =

Surinamese politician

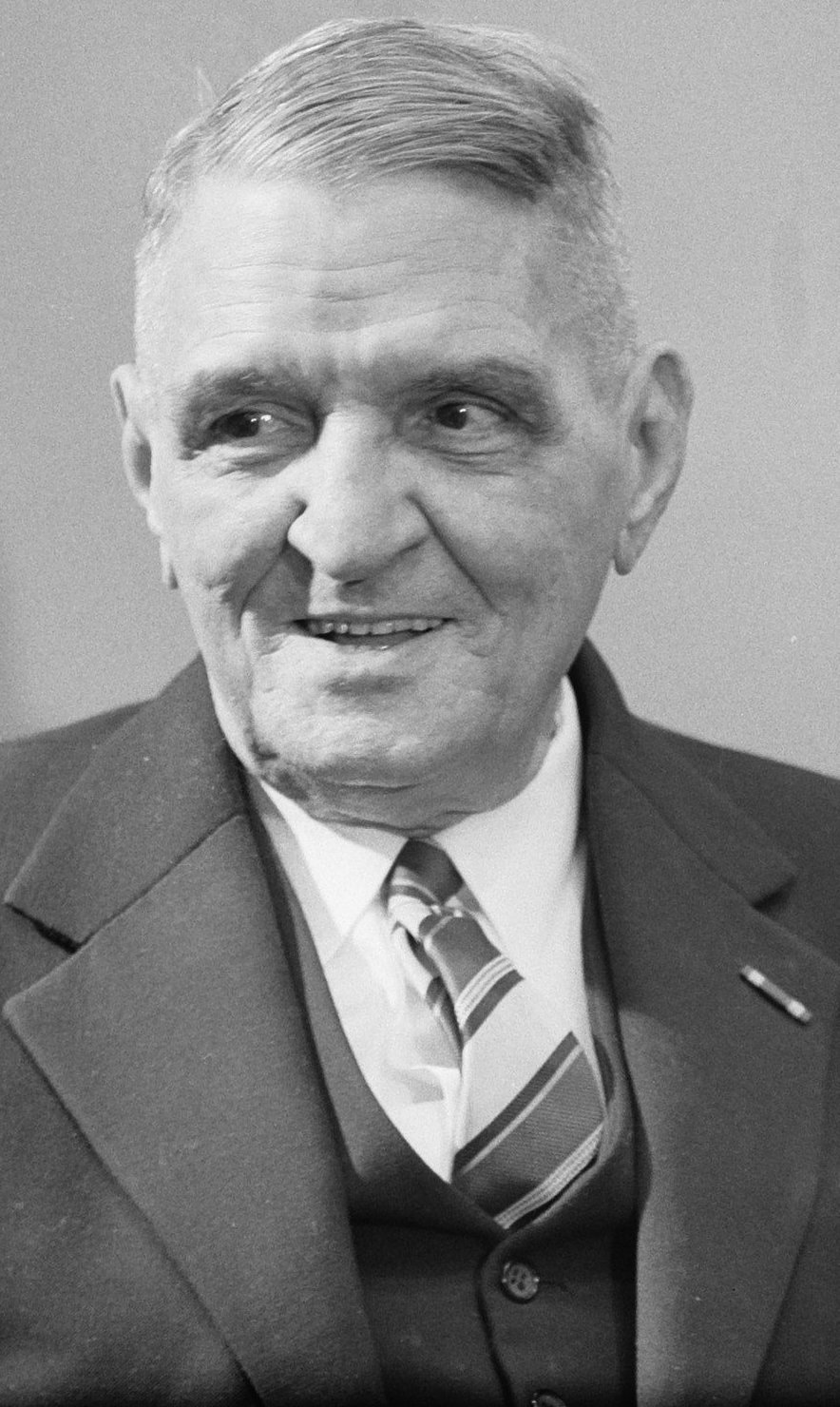
- Archibald Currie in 1963

Governor-General of Suriname
- In office 19 March 1963 – 22 August 1964
- Preceded by: Jan van Tilburg
- Succeeded by: François Haverschmidt

Prime Minister of Suriname
- In office 15 December 1954 – 16 April 1955
- Preceded by: Adriaan Alberga
- Succeeded by: Johan Ferrier

Personal details
- Born: 7 March 1888; Beneden-Cottica, Surinam
- Died: 28 November 1986 (aged 98); Rijswijk, Netherlands
- Political party: National Party of Suriname

Archibald Currie (7 March 1888 – 28 November 1986) was Prime Minister and Governor of Suriname.

Currie started his career as a surveyor. Later he was appointed as Chief of Police in Paramaribo. Between 1950 and 1954, he was first Minister of Finances and later Minister of Economic and Social Affairs. Currie became Prime Minister of Suriname from 1952 to 1955 and Governor of Suriname from 1962 to 1964. Between 19 March 1962 until 3 March 1963 as an Acting Governor, and 23 March 1963 to 24 September 1964 as appointed Governor. He was the first governor born in Suriname and was a member of the National Party of Suriname.

There is a statue of Currie made by Jozef Klas in front of the Presidential Palace.
