= Titus van Asch van Wijck =

Dutch politician and nobleman (1849–1902)

Jonkheer Titus van Asch van Wijck
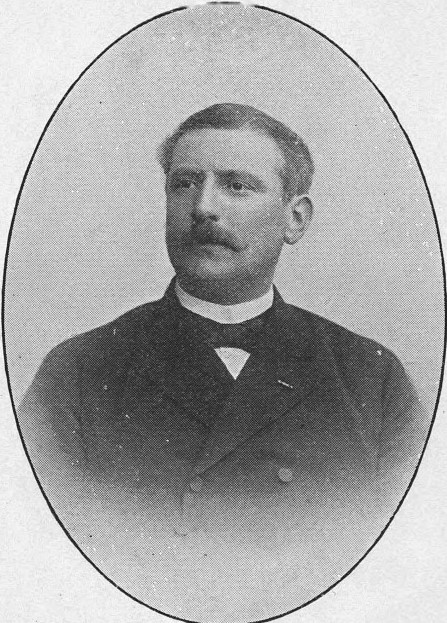

Minister of Colonial Affairs
- In office 1 August 1901 – 9 September 1902

Governor-General of Suriname
- In office 27 June 1891 – 12 May 1896
- Preceded by: de Savornin Lohman
- Succeeded by: Warmolt Tonckens

Personal details
- Born: Titus Anthony Jacob van Asch van Wijck; 29 August 1849 Utrecht, Netherlands
- Died: 9 September 1902 (aged 53) The Hague, Netherlands
- Party: Anti-Revolutionary

Jonkheer Titus Anthony Jacob van Asch van Wijck (29 August 1849 – 9 September 1902) was a Dutch nobleman, politician and colonial Governor of Suriname. He served as governor of Suriname (27 June 1891 – 12 May 1896) and colonial affairs minister (1 August 1901 – 9 September 1902) in the Kuyper cabinet. He was a leading member of the Anti-Revolutionary Party (ARP). He twice served as mayor of Amersfoort.

== Biography ==
Van Asch van Wijck was born on 29 August 1849 in Utrecht, Netherlands. He was the son of Matthias Margarethus van Asch van Wijck and the grandson of Hubert Matthijs Adriaan Jan van Asch van Wijck, both Dutch politicians. In 1875, he graduated from Utrecht University.

In 1880, van Asch van Wijck started working for the Ministry of War. On 29 September 1881, he was first elected to the House of Representatives. He would serve fives in parliament until 12 May 1891. He would also serve in the Provincial Council of Utrecht between 1 July 1885 and 1 June 1891, the Senate between 15 September 1896 and 1 August 1901, and the municipal council of The Hague between 17 May 1898 and 1 January 1900. Van Asch van Wijck was mayor of Amersfoort between 1 August 1883 and 1 June 1891, and once again from 1 January 1900 to 1 August 1901.

On 27 June 1891, van Asch van Wijck was appointed Governor of Suriname. He would become a popular governor who strived from financial independence of Suriname. His views resulted in a conflict with the Ministry of Colonies. In 1894, he turned in his resignation, however Queen Emma refused to accept it. He would reform agriculture, build new roads and canals, and improve education. Another conflict with the Ministry of Colonies, resulted in his resignation on 12 May 1896. From 27 June 1891 until 12 May 1896, he would serve as Minister of Colonies in the Kuyper cabinet.

Van Asch van Wijck died on 9 September 1902 in The Hague, at the age of 53.

== Honours and legacy ==
- Netherlands Knight in the Order of the Netherlands Lion.

The Van Asch Van Wijck Mountains in Suriname are named after him.

Political offices
| Preceded by Maurits de Savornin Lohman | Governor of Suriname; 1891–1896 | Succeeded by Warmolt Tonckens |
| Preceded by Jacob Theodoor Cremer | Minister of Colonial Affairs; 1901–1902 | Succeeded by Johannes Bergansius |
