= Jurriaan de Friderici =

Dutch military officer and plantation owner

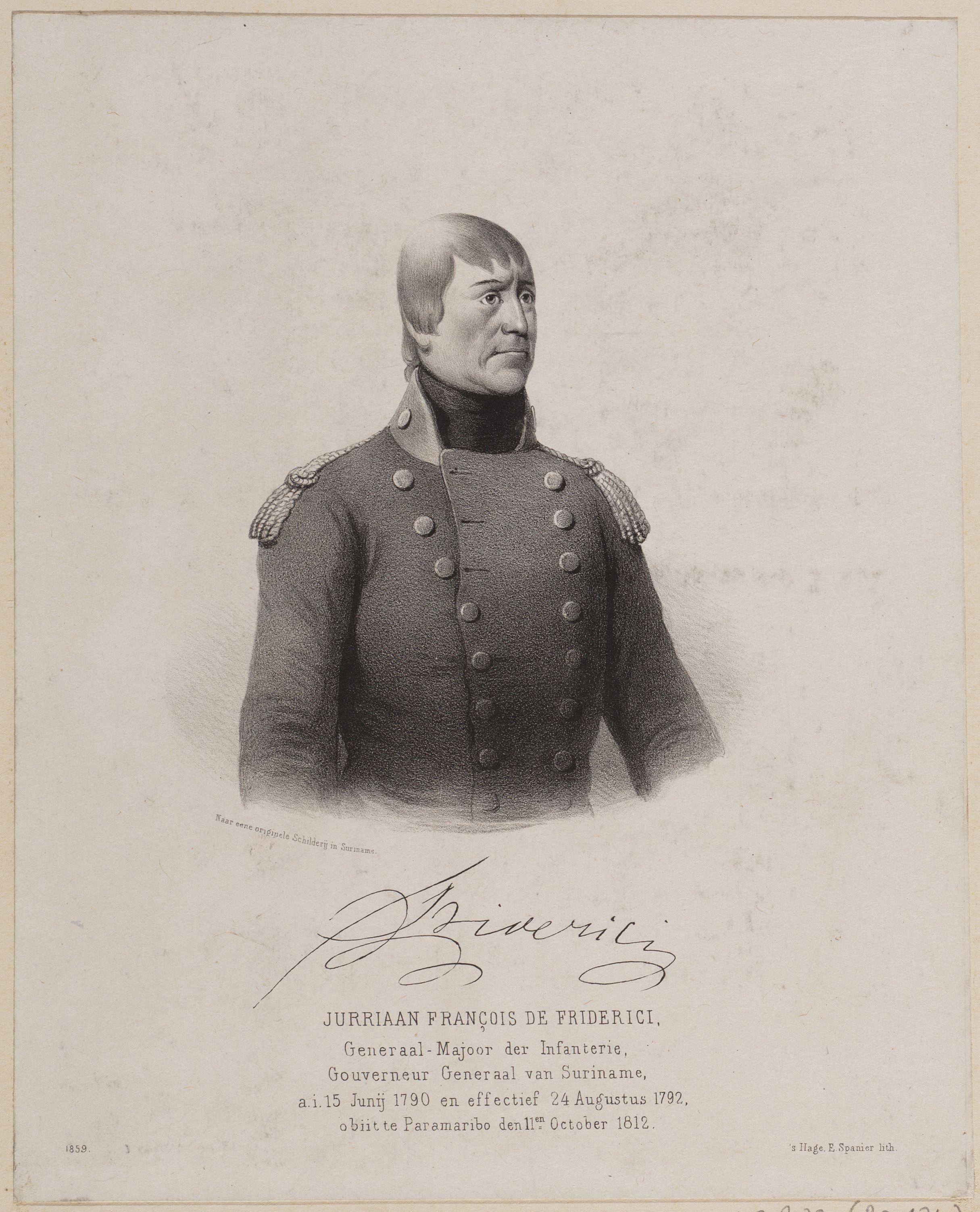

Governor-General of Suriname
- In office 16 June 1790 – 5 July 1802 acting until 24 August 1792
- Preceded by: Jan Wichers
- Succeeded by: Willem Otto Bloys van Treslong

Personal details
- Born: Jurriaan François de Friderici; 7 December 1751 Cape of Good Hope, Dutch Cape Colony
- Died: 11 October 1812 (aged 60) Paramaribo, Surinam
- Occupation: military officer, plantation owner

Jurriaan François de Friderici (Note: Also spelled Juriaan and Juriaen.) (7 December 1751 – 11 October 1812) was a Dutch military officer and plantation owner. He served as Governor of Suriname from 1790 until 1802. In the 1770s, he was involved in the Boni Wars. In 1799, Suriname was conquered by Great-Britain, however de Friderici changed allegiance and remained governor. He was dismissed in 1802 when the colony was returned to the Batavian Republic.

== Biography ==
De Friderici was born on 7 December 1751 in Cape of Good Hope, Dutch Cape Colony. His father was military officer who was sent to Paramaribo in 1762, and died there in 1763. In 1768, de Friderici was appointed vaandrig (lowest ranking officer) in the militia of Suriname.

In the 1760s, escaped slaves led by Boni banded together as the Aluku people. The Aluku raided plantations from their stronghold at Fort Boekoe. In 1772, a corps of Zwarte Jagers (black hunters), was recruited from 200 freed slaves and were commanded by de Friderici. The corps managed to take the fort after seven months of fighting, however Boni and many of his warriors escaped to French Guiana. De Friderici would continue fighting in the Boni Wars until 1790. During the wars, he was shot in both legs.

In 1790, de Friderici was appointed to the Court of Policy, and became acting Governor-General of Suriname on 16 June 1790 when Jan Wichers announced his leave. On 24 August 1792, he received his appointment. De Friderici had appreciated his Afro-Surinamese soldiers and after becoming gouvernor, he awarded them a piece of land to retire on. The land was often taken from his own properties.

In 1795, the Batavian Revolution occurred in the Netherlands which resulted in the flight of William V of Orange to Great-Britain. In the same year, a slave revolt took place in Cayenne in neighbouring French Guiana. De Friderici who was an orangist forbade any organisation involved with human rights, and instituted press censorship in the colony. In the Dutch and French press, a secret letter from William V to de Friderici was published announcing his intention to send British troops to Suriname.

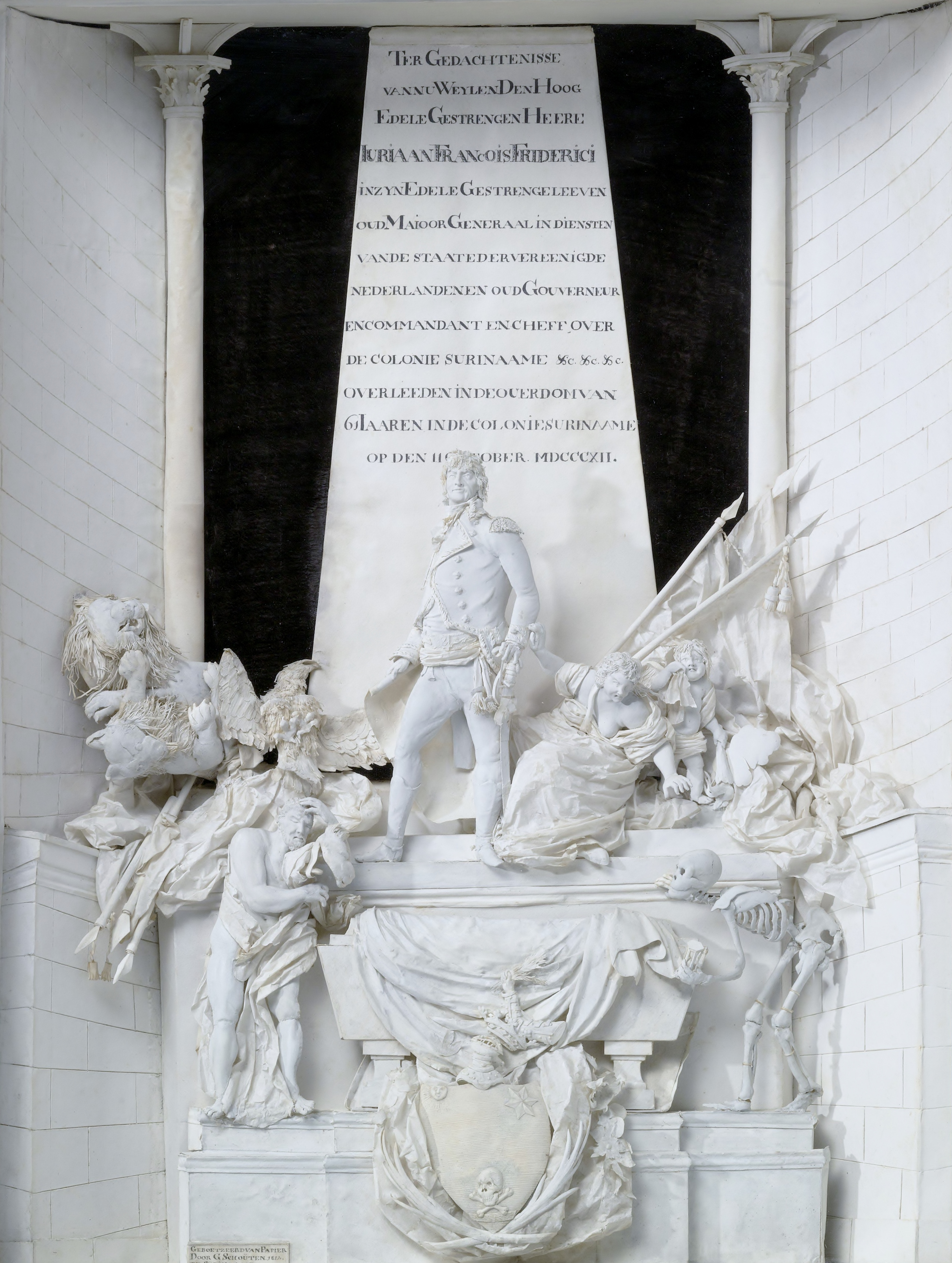
Papier-mâché model of the 1812 statue

In 1798, General Jean-Charles Pichegru and six other French military officers who had fallen from grace, and had been exiled to Cayenne, managed to escape and reached Paramaribo. De Friderici allowed them to board a ship to North America. When the French governor demanded their extradition, he replied that he could not find them, and assumed that they must have left Suriname.

On 13 August 1799, a British navy fleet commanded by Lord Hugh Seymour arrived near the coast of Suriname. De Friderici considered fighting futile and decided to negotiate. He surrendered the colony on 22 August. He swore an oath of allegiance to King George III, and was allowed to remain governor.

In 1802, the Treaty of Amiens was signed between France and Great-Britain which stipulated the return of all colonies to their previous owners. On 5 July 1802, de Friderici was dismissed by the Batavian Republic. De Friderici decided to remain in Suriname where he owned 13 plantations.

On 11 October 1812, de Friderici died in Paramaribo, at the age of 60. A marble statue was placed in the Centrumkerk in his honour, however it was lost in the 1821 fire.

== Bibliography ==
- Bijlsma, R. (1921). "De jeugd van Juriaen Francois Friderici, Gouverneur-Generaal van Suriname". New West Indian Guide / Nieuwe West-Indische Gids (in Dutch). 2. Leiden: Brill: 122–126. doi:10.1163/22134360-90001806.
- Kalff, S. (1929). "Iets over J.F. de Friderici". New West Indian Guide / Nieuwe West-Indische Gids (in Dutch). 10. Leiden: Brill: 214–227. doi:10.1163/22134360-90001284.
- Wolbers, J. (1861). Geschiedenis van Suriname (in Dutch). Amsterdam: S. Emmerling. ISBN 90-6033-091-9.
