= Johannes Brons =

Dutch politician (1884–1964)

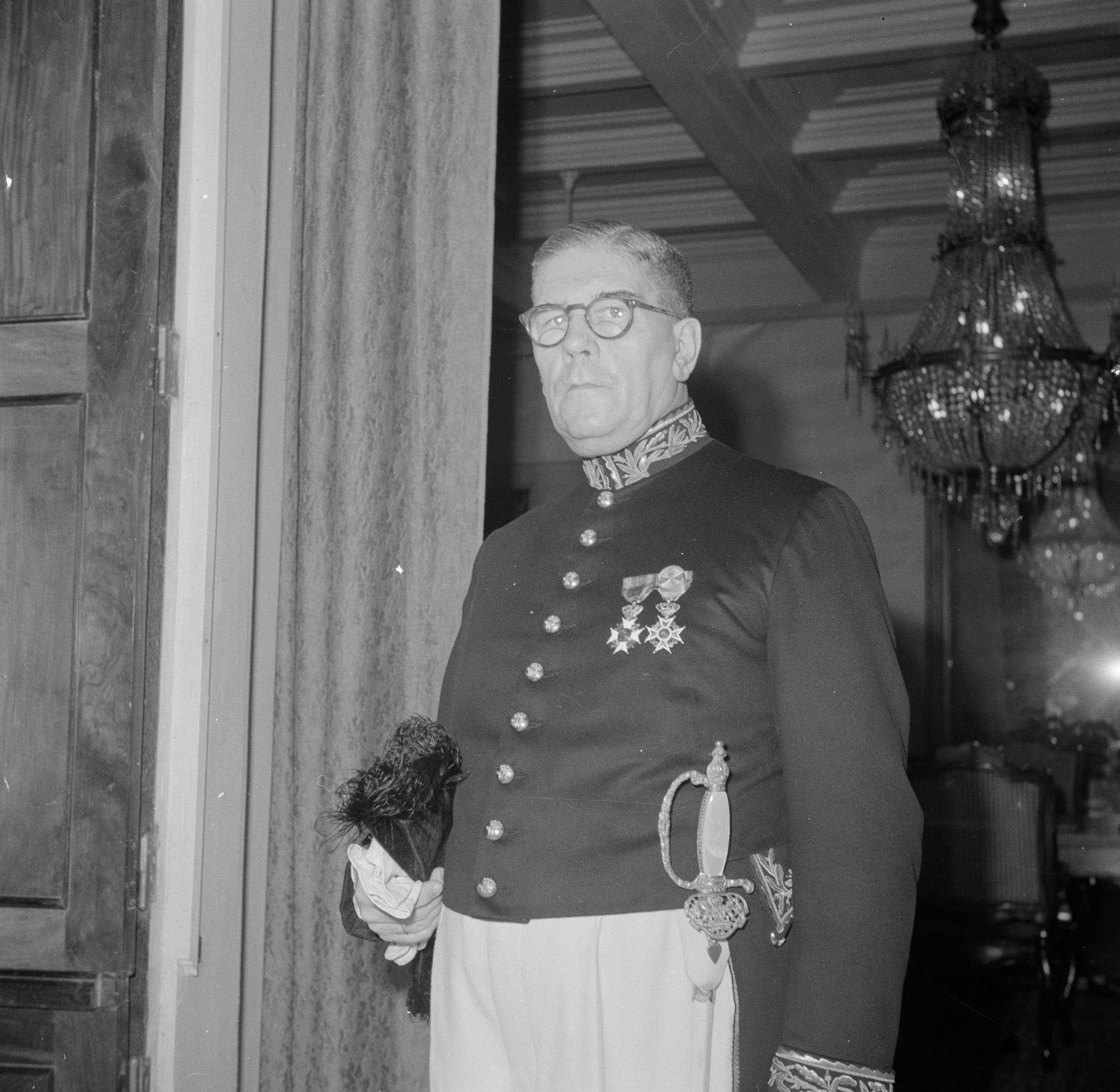
- Johannes Brons (1947)

Governor-General of Suriname
- In office 26 July 1944 – 5 July 1948
- Preceded by: Johannes Kielstra
- Succeeded by: Willem Huender

President of the Colonial Estates
- In office 1930–1935

Personal details
- Born: Johannes Cornelis Brons; 6 August 1884; The Hague, Netherlands
- Died: 12 May 1964 (aged 79); The Hague, Netherlands
- Occupation: Judge, politician

Johannes Cornelis Brons (Note: Amigoe insisted that his middle name is Cornilis, and that they did not make an error, however no other sources seem to back up the claim.) (6 August 1884 – 12 May 1964) was a judge, Governor of Suriname from 1944 until 1948, and President of the High Court of Justice of Suriname.

== Biography ==
Brons was born on 6 August 1884 in The Hague. He studied law at Leiden University, and received his doctorate in 1909. Between 1909 and 1926, he worked as a lawyer and prosecutor in Rotterdam.

In 1926, Brons went to Suriname, served on the High Court of Justice of Suriname, and became the president of the court in 1929. He served until 1943. In 1930, he was elected to the Colonial Estates, and subsequently became its President. In 1935, he resigned from the Estates.

Brons served as Acting Governor-General of Suriname from 16 August 1935 until 12 April 1936, September 1938 until January 1939, and again on 3 January 1944. On 26 July 1944, he was officially appointed Governor, and served until 5 July 1948.

During his tenure as governor, Brons tried to reform suffrage which was limited to wealthy men. His first attempt was rejected by the Estates of Suriname. His second attempt to award suffrage to all who had finished primary school passed in September 1945. After his tenure, in July 1948, universal suffrage was established in Suriname.

Between 1948 and 1949, Brons worked at the Dutch Embassy in Havana. He died on 12 May 1964 in The Hague, at the age of 79.

== Honours and legacy ==
Brons was commander in the Order of Orange-Nassau, and knight of the Order of the Netherlands Lion.

In 1948, a square in Paramaribo which contained the Lanti Djari football field, was renamed Mr. Bronsplein in his honour.
