= Jan Klaasesz =

Dutch politician

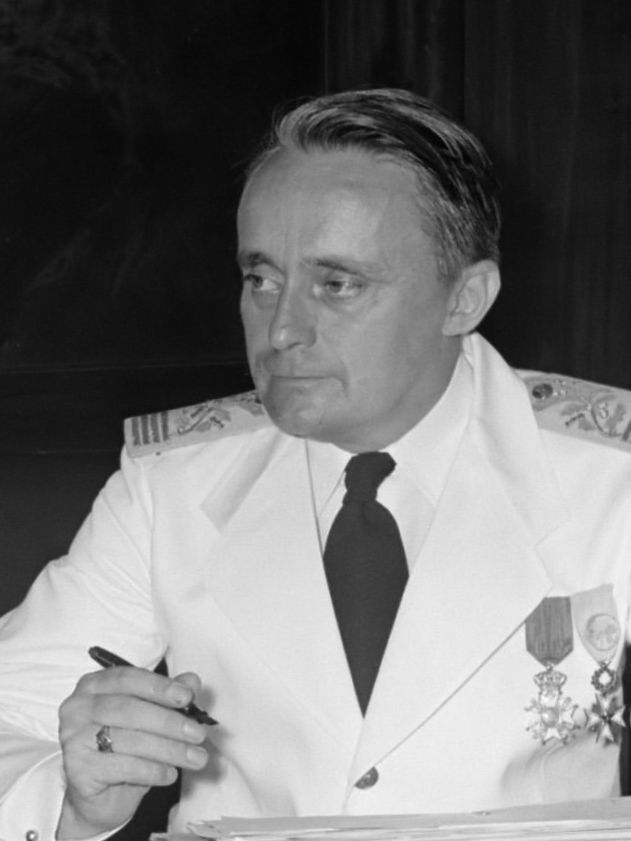
- Jan Klaasesz in 1955

Queen's Commissioner of South Holland
- In office 16 January 1956 – 1 March 1972
- Preceded by: Lodewijk Albert Kesper
- Succeeded by: Maarten Vrolijk

Governor-General of Suriname
- In office 2 December 1949 – 11 February 1956
- Preceded by: Willem Huender
- Succeeded by: Jan van Tilburg

Personal details
- Born: 5 February 1907; IJlst, Netherlands
- Died: 29 November 1997 (aged 90); Voorschoten, Netherlands
- Political party: Labour Party

Jan Klaasesz (5 February 1907 – 29 November 1997) was a Dutch politician for the Labour Party, who was Governor of Suriname between 1949 and 1956, and who was Queen's Commissioner of South Holland between 1956 and 1972.
