= Willem van Panhuys =

Dutch soldier and colonial administrator (1764–1816)

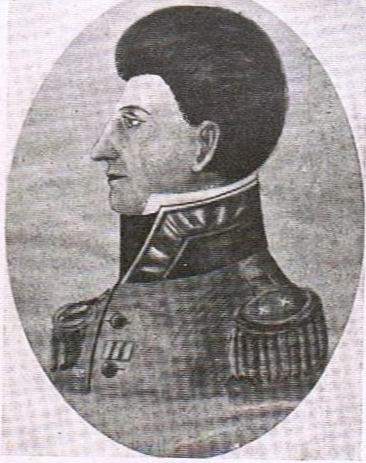

Governor of Suriname
- In office 27 February 1816 – 18 July 1816
- Preceded by: Pinson Bonham
- Succeeded by: Cornelis Vaillant

Personal details
- Born: Willem Benjamin van Panhuys; 5 December 1764 Maastricht, Dutch Republic
- Died: 18 July 1816 (aged 51) Paramaribo, Surinam
- Spouses: Alexandrine Reijnsdorp (1790–1797); Louise van Panhuys (1805-his death)
- Occupation: military officer, planter, governor

Willem Benjamin van Panhuys (5 December 1764 – 18 July 1816) was a Dutch army officer, planter and colonial administrator who served as the governor of Suriname from 27 February 1816 until his death on 18 July.

== Biography ==
Van Panhuys was born on 5 December 1764 in Maastricht, Dutch Republic. At the age of 14, he joined the army. On 24 April 1793, he had been promoted lieutenant colonel, and fought against the French in the Austrian Netherlands. He led his troops in the Battle of Fleurus who initially managed repel the French attack, but had to retreat ten days later. On 18 January 1795, William V, Prince of Orange fled to Great Britain, and on 20 January, the Dutch army capitulated. Van Panhuys decided to move to Germany.

In 1790, van Panhuys had married Alexandrine Elisabeth Reijnsdorp who owned the coffee and cotton plantation Reijnsdorp in Suriname. Alexandrine died on 10 September 1797, and by 1800, he was in Suriname which had been conquered by Great-Britain.

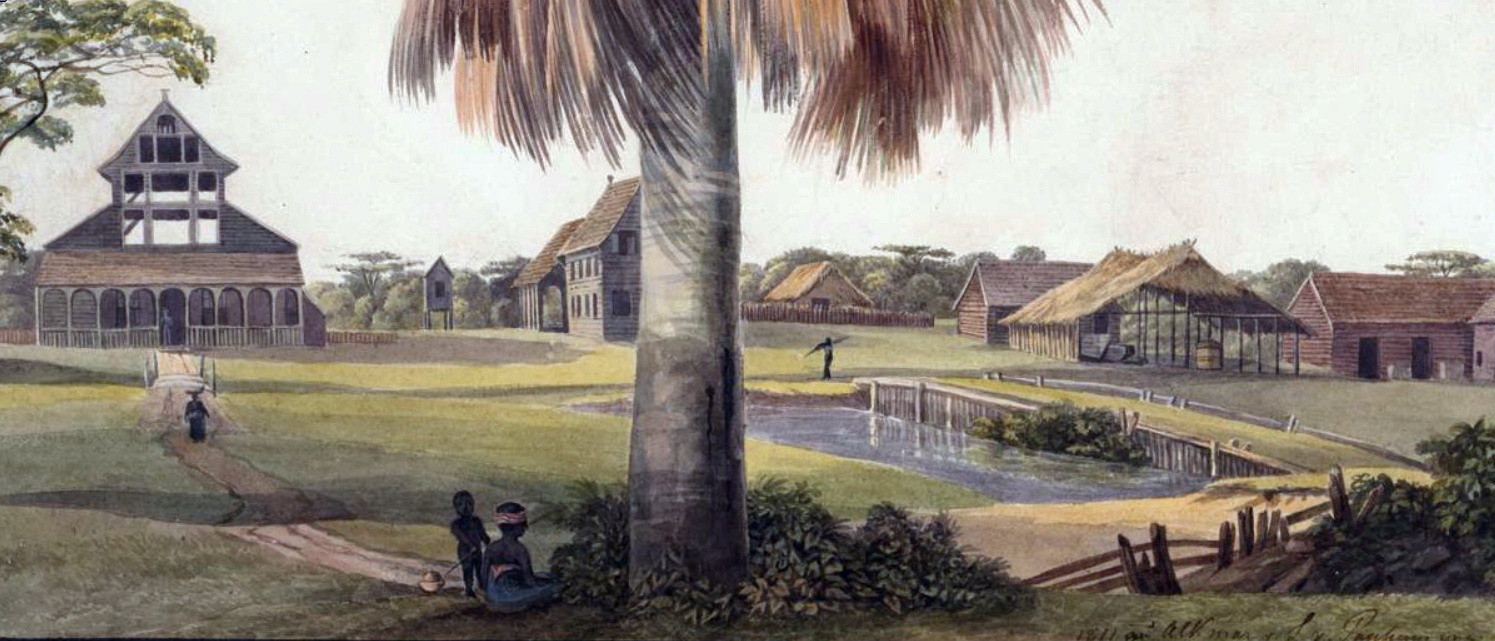
Plantation Alkmaar by Louise van Panhuys (1811)

On 8 November 1805, van Panhuys married Louise Fredericq Auguste, Baroness von Barckhaus Wiesenhütten. In 1811, they left for Suriname and bought plantation Alkmaar in addition to his plantations of Reijnsdorp and Nut en Schadelijk. Louise was a watercolour painter who made many paintings of the landscape and nature. Surprisingly, she would often write down the names of the slaves in the pictures.

In 1813, van Panhuys was in Great Britain, and on 27 November, he was appointed to lead a battalion in the King's Dutch Brigade in the reconquest of the Netherlands. On 27 March 1814, his battalion landed in Hellevoetsluis to fight against Napoleon. On 11 April, after the reconquest, van Panhuys asked to be discharged which was granted on 10 May with a promotion to Major General.

In the Anglo-Dutch Treaty of 1814, it was decided that Suriname should be returned to the Netherlands. On 18 January 1815, van Panhuys was appointed as Governor of Suriname, however given the war in Europe, the instalment was delayed until Napoleon was defeated. In late 1815, he left the Netherlands with a 1,000 men, and arrived in Suriname in January 1816. On 26 February, Governor Pinson Bonham relinquished his command, and van Panhuys was installed on 27 February.

Van Panhuys issued a proclamation which had been approved by the States General of the Netherlands on 14 September 1815, that all civil servants and military personnel who had sworn loyalty to the British crown were now dismissed as well as all members of the Court of Policy and Court of Justice. He also divided Suriname into eight districts.

After returning from Nieuw Amsterdam, van Panhuys fell ill, and died five days later on 18 July 1816, at the age of 51. His wife Louise would persist in her letters that he was murdered, however there is no evidence to the claim.

== Bibliography ==
- Blok, P.J.; Molhuysen, P.C. (1921). Nieuw Nederlandsch biografisch woordenboek. Deel 5 (in Dutch). Leiden: A.W. Sijthoff.
- Panhuys, L.C. van (1925). "De Gouverneur-generaal Wllem Benjamin van Panhuys". New West Indian Guide (in Dutch). 6. Leiden: Brill: 289–320. doi:10.1163/22134360-90001542.
- Wolbers, J. (1861). Geschiedenis van Suriname (in Dutch). Amsterdam: S. Emmerling. ISBN 90-6033-091-9.
