= Jan van Tilburg =

Dutch politician

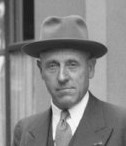

Governor-General of Suriname
- In office 11 February 1956 – 18 March 1962
- Preceded by: Jan Klaasesz
- Succeeded by: Archibald Currie

Member of the Senate
- In office 18 September 1951 – 28 December 1955

Personal details
- Born: 16 June 1900; Rotterdam, Netherlands
- Died: 21 October 1977 (aged 77); Rotterdam, Netherlands
- Political party: Labour Party

Jan van Tilburg (16 June 1900 – 21 October 1977) was a Dutch politician for the Labour Party who was a member of the Senate between 1951 and 1955 and Governor of Suriname between 1956 and 1962. During his tenure in government, the Brokopondo Reservoir was created to supply electricity for the Suralco aluminium plant.

== Biography ==
Van Tilburg was born on 16 June 1900 in Rotterdam, Netherlands. He started to for work for the taxation office. During World War II, he was a member of the Nationaal Steun Fonds, an organisation to finance resistance activities, and the chair of the Work Committee Illegality Rotterdam.

In 1945, van Tilburg became a councillor in Rotterdam, and started to work for the harbour. From 18 September 1951 until 28 December 1955, he was a member of the Senate. From 6 July 1954 until December 1955, he was a member of the Provincial States of South Holland.

On 11 February 1956, van Tilburg was appointed Governor-General of Suriname. During his tenure, the Brokopondo Reservoir was created to supply electricity for the Suralco aluminium plant. He served until 18 March 1962, and returned to Rotterdam.

In Rotterdam, van Tilburg was president of the Scheepvaart Vereeniging Zuid until 1967. He died on 21 October 1977, at the age of 77.

== Honours ==
- Netherlands Commander in the Order of the Netherlands Lion.
- Netherlands Knight in the Order of Orange Nassau.
- Denmark Commander in the Order of the Dannebrog.
- France Commander in the Order of the Black Star.
