= Jan Wichers =

Dutch military officer and lawyer

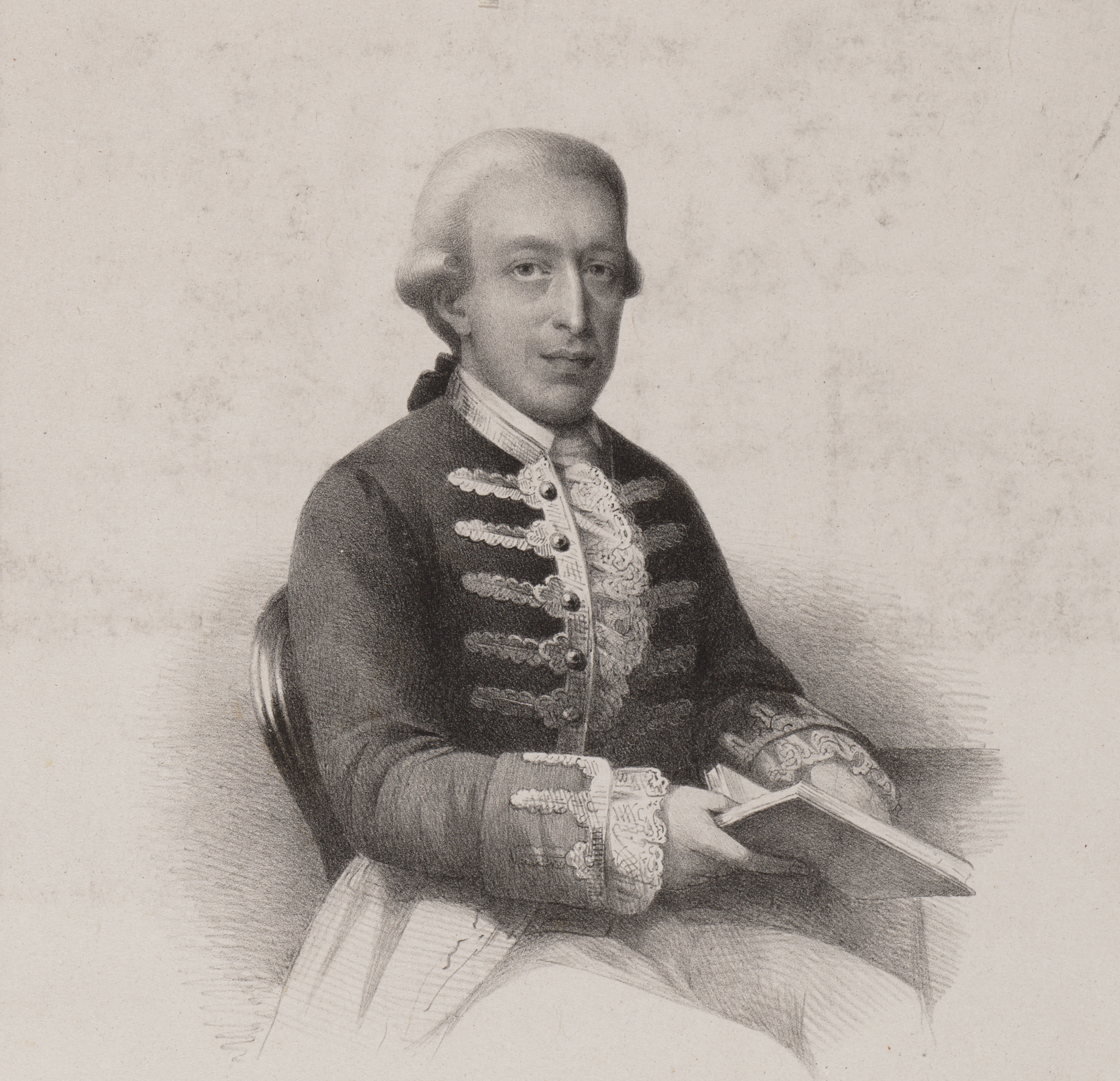

Governor-General of Suriname
- In office 24 December 1784 – 15 June 1790
- Preceded by: Bernard Texier
- Succeeded by: Jurriaan François de Friderici

Personal details
- Born: Jan Gerhard Wichers; 15 July 1745 Groningen, Dutch Republic
- Died: 3 October 1808 (aged 63) Vreeswijk, Kingdom of Holland
- Occupation: military officer, lawyer

Jan Gerard Wichers (15 July 1745 – 3 October 1808) was a military officer and lawyer. He served as Governor of Suriname from 1784 until 1790.

== Biography ==
Wichers was born on 15 July 1745 in Groningen, Dutch Republic. In 1760, he started studying law at the University of Groningen, and obtained his doctorate on 15 June 1768. He enlisted in the army.

In 1771, Wichers was appointed Raad Fiscaal (Attorney general) in Suriname. In 1775, Jan Wicherides, his only child, was born as a result of an extra-maritial affair with the free negress Adjuba. Jan Wicherides would later become mayor of Uithoorn.

On 24 December 1784, Wichers was appointed Governor-General of Suriname. In 1785, he was promoted major general. In 1790, Fort Groningen was built. A city was planned around the fort, however the development of the town remained limited. Wichers wanted to promote a mixed race middle class, because he felt that the Europeans in the colony had little loyalty to Suriname. He had planned, but never executed, to give an award of ƒ100,- for every mixed race child who was manumitted.

On 15 June 1790, Wichers was succeeded by Jurriaan François de Friderici. He returned to the Netherlands, and became a member of the Council of American Colonies in the Hague. In 1806, he became a member of the Maatschappij der Nederlandse Letterkunde.

Wichers died on 3 October 1808 in Vreeswijk, at the age of 63.

== Legacy ==
In 2012, RTV Noord aired a documentary about Groningen, Suriname, the town founded by Jan Wichers.
