= Landrentestelsel =

Taxation system in the Dutch East Indies

The Landrentestelsel (English: Land Tax System) was a system of taxation levied in the Dutch East Indies between 1816 and 1830, under which the indigenous population paid a predetermined portion (one half, two-fifths, or one third) of its agricultural produce or a monetary sum of similar value to the colonial administration. While this system was implemented after Dutch control over Java was restored in accordance with the Convention of London, it had been preceded by the Landrente (based off the English Land Tax), which had been introduced by Lieutenant Governor-General Stamford Raffles in 1811, during the British interregnum. It was replaced with the Cultivation System implemented by Governor-General Johannes van den Bosch in 1830.

== Overview ==
Although the British interregnum lasted only five years, the system it left behind was maintained and considered in compliance with the applicable legal provisions. This included the landrente, which the Dutch colonial government continued to enforce as a source of revenue for the state budget. In principle, the Dutch Commissioner-General followed most of the steps Raffles took. In 1818, a new regulation regarding the land tax was devised and trialed. However, this only reinforced the conditions created by Raffles, and the Commissioners-General were left to determine what changes could be achieved as they were more preoccupied with politics and security than with research in the field.

Village levies provided opportunities for the practice of tax farming by individuals who could afford it in the first place. Due to the government's inability to conduct land research down to the village level, they entrusted it to village heads or native outsiders. As a result, supra-village officials responsible for the village could enter into transactions with foreigners. Usually, private entities taxed the land throughout the village. These transactions and practices were prevalent between 1816 and 1825 and led to massive exploitation as there was no clear standard for determining tax rates in each village. These conditions worsened and became one of the factors that led to the Java War.
