= Cornelis Vaillant =

Dutch lawyer, jurist and politician

Governor of Suriname
- In office 19 July 1816 – 1 April 1822
- Preceded by: Willem van Panhuys
- Succeeded by: Abraham de Veer

Personal details
- Born: Cornelis Reinhard Vaillant; 26 May 1781 Amsterdam, Dutch Republic
- Died: 9 January 1849 (aged 67) The Hague, Netherlands
- Occupation: lawyer, judge, governor

Cornelis Reinhard Vaillant (26 May 1781 – 9 January 1849) was a Dutch lawyer, judge, and colonial governor. He served as Governor of Suriname from 19 July 1816 until 1 April 1822, and as judge on the Supreme Court of the Netherlands from 1838 until 1849.

== Biography ==
Vaillant was born on 26 May 1781 in Amsterdam, Dutch Republic. In 1805, he graduated law at the University of Leiden. In 1811, he started to work as clerk to the Cour Impériale en Hollande. In 1815, he became advocate general at the High Court in The Hague.

In 1816, Vaillant went to Surinam where he was appointed raad-fiscaal (prosecutor general) for the Court of Justice. Governor Willem van Panhuys died on 18 July 1816. The next day, Vaillant became acting Governor of Suriname. The two regiments in Suriname during the British occupation (1804-1816) had been disbanded, and a temporary corps of Coloureds and Free Negroes had taken its place. In December 1816, the schutterij (militia) was created which was divided in a White, Coloured and Free Negro division.

In 1817, the first school law of Suriname passed which outlawed cruel punishment except for moderate birching. The slave trade had been outlawed on 13 August 1814, however it continued illegally much to the dismay of Great Britain. On 4 May 1818, a joint Anglo-Dutch court was established. In 1821, there was a large fire in Paramaribo which destroyed a large part of the centre. In 1822, Vaillant requested to be relieved, and was replaced by Abraham de Veer on 1 April.

On 3 February 1823, Vaillent was appointed judge on the High Court in The Hague, and on 1 June 1838, he was appointed judge on the Supreme Court of the Netherlands.

Vaillent died on 9 January 1849 in The Hague, at the age of 67.

== Bibliography ==
- Wolbers, J. (1861). Geschiedenis van Suriname (in Dutch). Amsterdam: S. Emmerling. ISBN 90-6033-091-9.
