= Maurits Adriaan de Savornin Lohman =

Dutch governor (1832-1899)

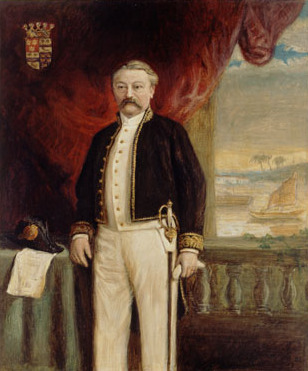

Governor-General of Suriname
- In office 30 January 1889 – 27 June 1891
- Preceded by: Hendrik Jan Smidt
- Succeeded by: Titus Anthony Jacob van Asch van Wijck

Personal details
- Born: 9 January 1832 Groningen, Netherlands
- Died: 12 July 1899 (aged 67) The Hague, Netherlands

Maurits Adriaan de Savornin Lohman (9 January 1832 — 12 July 1899) was the Dutch Governor of Surinam from 1889 to 1891.

== Biography ==
De Savornin Lohman studied Roman and contemporary law from 1850 to 1855 at the University of Groningen.

From 1861 to 1870 he was deputy prosecutor in Assen, then until 1886 prosecutor. In 1886 he was appointed Advocate General at the Supreme Court of the Netherlands, which position he held until October 1888. Subsequently, he was appointed as the Governor of Surinam on 30 January 1889.

== Governor of Surinam ==
His rule of Surinam was controversial. De West-Indiër was the first newspaper to publicly criticize the governor, and was immediately taken to court. He tried to impose taxes on the Maroons in Para District which was met with strong resistance. On 23 December 1889, De Savornin Lohman refused to inform the Estates of Suriname. This led to accusations of undemocratic behaviour and anti-Semitism, because many members of the Estates were Jewish. On 18 September 1890, pastor G. C. Steijnis spoke out against De Savornin Lohman from the pulpit of the Martin Luther Church. Steijnis was harassed for months, returned to the Netherlands, and died on the journey. In 1891, anti-Semitic riots broke out during which one person was killed. On 27 June 1891, De Savornin was dismissed by the Colonial Government.

== Family ==
His daughter Catharina Anna Maria de Savornin Lohman was a writer, critic and journalist, and his younger brother Alexander de Savornin Lohman was a politician who briefly served as the Dutch Minister of the Interior.
