= Louise van Panhuys =

German artist (1763–1844)

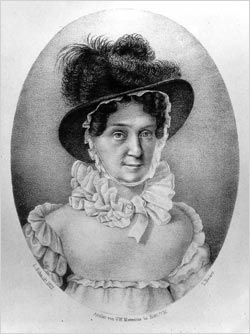
- Born: Louise Friederike Auguste von Barckhaus of Wiesenhütten; October 10, 1763; Frankfurt, Holy Roman Empire
- Died: October 18, 1844 (aged 81); Frankfurt, German Confederation
- Known for: Botanical art, Landscape painting
- Notable work: 90 watercolors of Suriname flora
- Spouse: Willem Benjamin van Panhuys (m. 1805)
- Parents: Heinrich Carl von Barckhaus of Wiesenhütten (father); Charlene von Barckhaus of Wiesenhütten (mother)

Louise van Panhuys née von Barckhaus of Wiesenhütten (October 10, 1763 – October 18, 1844) was a German botanical artist and landscape painter.

== Early years ==
Born Louise Friederike Auguste von Barckhaus of Wiesenhütten in Frankfurt, she was the sixth child of Charlene von Barckhaus of Wiesenhütten (1736–1804), and Heinrich Carl von Barckhaus of Wiesenhütten (1725–1793), who was later made a baron. She received artistic training from her mother, who was an amateur painter, and from a relative, Christian Georg Schütz the Elder. Through family connections, she made the acquaintance of the poet Johann Wolfgang von Goethe early in life and they later corresponded.

She moved to Darmstadt, probably after the death of her father, and lived with one of her brothers. Between 1802 and 1805 she took two long trips to England with her brother, where she made contact with English naturalists and botanical illustrators in order to continue her education as a painter. It appears that during this period she took private lessons with the well-known botanical painter James Sowerby.

== Marriage ==
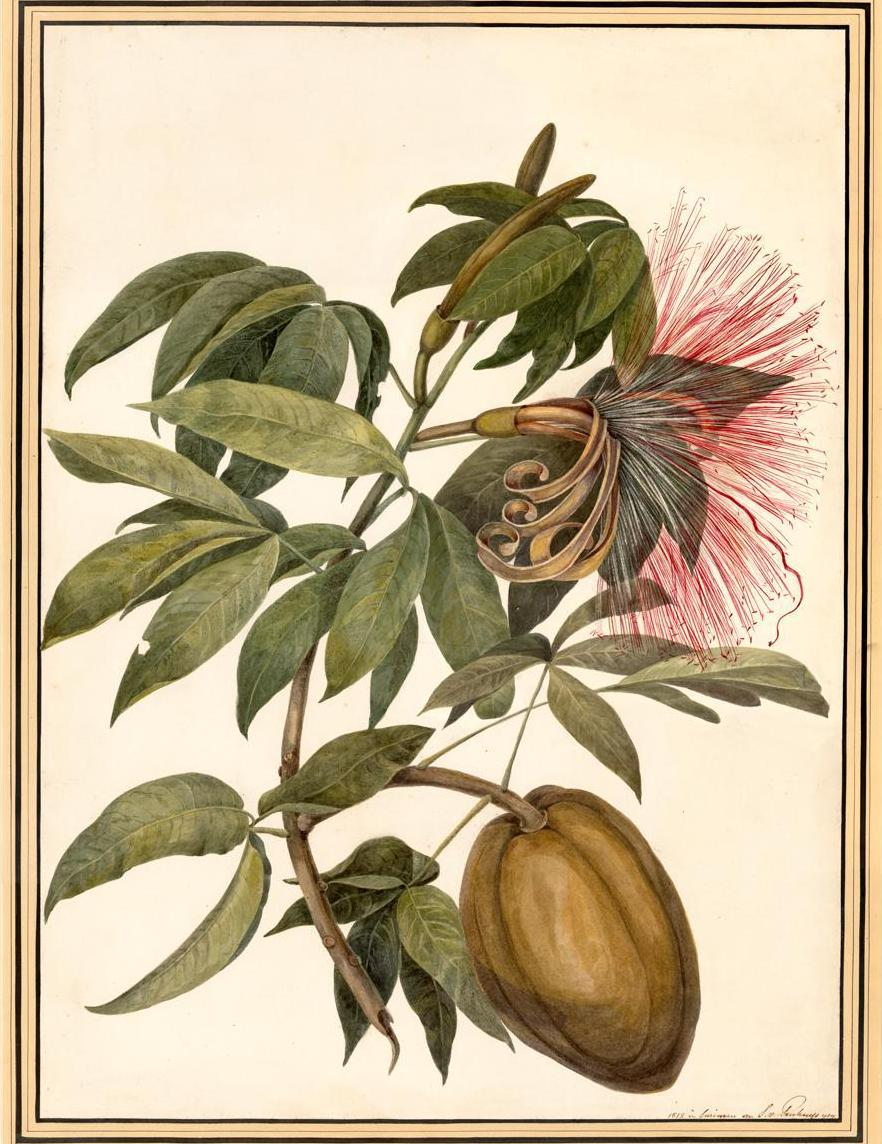
Watercolor painting from her Suriname period (1812)

In 1805, she married a widowed Dutch officer, Willem Benjamin van Panhuys (1764–1816). In 1811, they traveled to Suriname, where he had a coffee plantation inherited from his deceased first wife. They later acquired the sugar cane plantation Alkmaar there as well. In early 1816, Suriname—which has been occupied by the English since 1804—returned to Dutch rule. Willem was appointed Governor-General by King William I of the Netherlands, but his tenure in office lasted only a few months as he died in July 1816. Louise then moved back to Frankfurt, where she lived in a house that had once belonged to Matthäus Merian the Younger.

== Art ==
Louise van Panhuys mainly painted watercolors of plant specimens, with attention to scientific accuracy. She was influenced by the botanical art of Maria Sibylla Merian and the travel writings of Alexander von Humboldt. During her years in Suriname, she painted some 90 watercolors, now housed Frankfurt University Library.

In 1898, her work was shown publicly for the first time by the Senckenberg Nature Research Society. More recently, exhibitions showcasing her work have been mounted by the Frankfurt University Library (1991), the Frankfurter Sparkasse (2009) and Stedelijk Museum Alkmaar (2022).

== Sources ==
This article is translated from de:Louise von Panhuys. Sources listed on that page include:

- Reise nach Surinam, Pflanzen- und Landschaftsbilder der Louise von Panhuys 1763–1844, with contributions by Karin Görner and Klaus Dobat. Published by the Senckenberg Library of Goethe University Frankfurt, Frankfurt am Main, 1991. ISBN 3-921185-05-X. (In German)
- Bickel, Stefanie, and Esther Walldorf. Elisabeth Schultz und Louise von Panhuys – Zwei Frankfurter Malerinnen des 19. Jahrhunderts zwischen Kunst und Wissenschaft. Published by the 1822-Stiftung der Frankfurter Sparkasse. Frankfurt am Main 2009. (In German)
- Hücking, Renate. Surinam am Main – Die Landschafts- und Pflanzenmalerin Louise von Panhuys. In Pinien, Palmen, Pomeranzen – Exotische Gartenwelten in FrankfurtRheinMain. Published by KulturRegion FrankfurtRheinMain (Projektleitung: Heidrun Merk). Frankfurt/M.: Societäts-Verlag 2012, S. 102–111. ISBN 978-3-942921-84-8. (In German)
