= Johann Lauffer =

Swiss-born soldier, colonial administrator and businessman

Director of Curaçao and Dependencies
- In office 1 December 1796 – 13 January 1803
- Preceded by: Jan Jacob Beaujon
- Succeeded by: Abraham de Veer

Personal details
- Born: Johann Rudolf Lauffer; 7 November 1752 Zofingen, Aargau, Switzerland
- Died: 24 December 1833 (aged 81) Willemstad, Curaçao, Dutch West Indies
- Occupation: soldier, colonial administrator, businessman

Johann Rudolf Lauffer (7 November 1752 – 24 December 1833) was a Swiss soldier, colonial administrator and businessman. He became Director of Curaçao and Dependencies after a military coup d'état on 1 December 1796 and served until 13 January 1803.

== Early life ==
Lauffer was born on 7 November 1752 in Zofingen, Aargau, Switzerland. He decided to earn a living in America and signed up as a mercenary with the Dutch West India Company (GWC). In 1774, Lauffer arrived in Curaçao on a salary of eight guilders a month. He enlisted in the local schutterij (militia) in 1776 and was later discharged from GWC service. On 5 February 1786, at age 33, Lauffer married the 43-year-old widow Petronella Rojer (1742–1800), a member of the well-known Curaçaoan Rojer family.

== Governor of Curaçao ==
On 18 January 1795, amid the War of the First Coalition, William V, Prince of Orange fled the Netherlands and went into exile in Great Britain, shortly before the proclamation of the Batavian Republic. While in exile, Willem V started writing the Kew Letters to the colonial governors urging them to submit to the British. Governor Johannes de Veer refused to recognize the Batavian Republic, and was replaced by Jan Jacob Beaujon in August 1796. On 14 August, Lauffer was elected by acclamation as the new commander of the Military Committee.

Beaujon appointed J.M. Brunnings, an orangist, as the new secretary which led to a conflict with Lauffer and the patriots (Republicans). On 20 October 1796, the French commander M. Valteau arrived on the island with a defence plan, and Lauffer had taken control of all the military forces including the corps of free blacks and mulattoes. To gain popular support, Beaujon was characterised as an orangist and pro-British and was compared to his brother Antony who had handed Demerara to the British. On 1 December, Lauffer overthrew the government with the military and French troops from Guadelope, and was installed as Director of Curaçao and Dependencies.

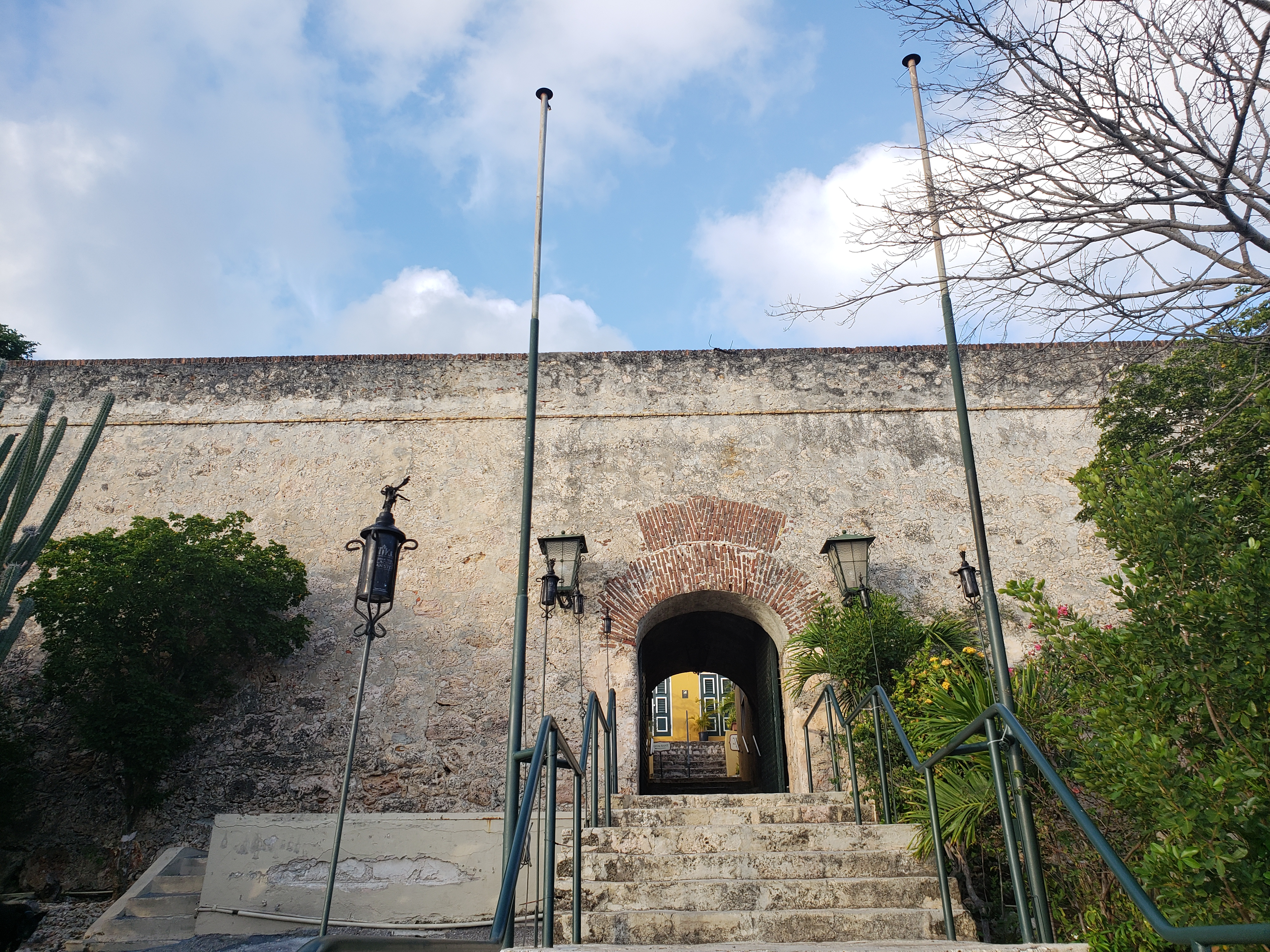
Fort Republic

To prevent attacks by the British navy, Lauffer ordered the construction of Fort Republiek (now: Fort Oranje Nassau) on Curaçao and Fort Zoutman on Aruba. Even though Curaçao was aligned with France, he tried to keep troops off the islands, and focused on commercial interests.

In 1800, French troops from Guadeloupe landed on Curaçao in order to prevent a possible attack of the British. Lauffer managed to contact the Americans and British, and informed them that he was prepared to surrender the islands under the same terms as Suriname. On 21 September 1800, the Americans landed, and most of the French troops fled. On 17 October, Lauffer officially surrendered to British rule. He resigned on 23 October, however, Lord Hugh Seymour refused to accept his resignation, and persuaded him to stay on as governor.

The islands were returned to the Netherlands by the Peace of Amiens. On 13 January 1803, Lauffer was succeeded by Abraham de Veer, and was ordered to return to the Netherlands. On 12 November 1805, after a court-martial, he was acquitted and honourably discharged, and given a passport for him and his slave Johannes Theodorus.

== Later life ==
Lauffer returned to Curaçao, and stayed out of politics for the rest of his life. In 1799, he had bought the Bleinheim plantation. From then on he focused on international trade, the Amsterdam and New York stock exchanges, and became one of the biggest mortgage holders in Curaçao. Lauffer died on 24 December 1833 at his estate of Bleinheim, at the age of 81.

== Legacy ==
In August 1952, a new high school in Curaçao was named "Gouverneur Johann Rudolf Lauffer School".

== Bibliography ==
- Meeteren, N. van (1944). Noodlotsdagen (in Dutch). Willemstad: De Stad N.V.
- Fatah-Black, Karwan (2011). "The Patriot coup d'état in Curaçao, 1796". Curaçao in the Age of Revolutions, 1795-1800. Leiden: KITLV. ISBN 978-90-6718-380-2.
