= List of colonial governors of Suriname =

Flag of the governor of Suriname (1966–1975)

This is a list of colonial governors of Suriname, a country in northern South America. It borders French Guiana to the east, Guyana to the west, Brazil to the south, and the Atlantic Ocean to the north. Suriname was first colonized by the British, and captured by the Dutch in 1667, who governed it as Surinam until 1954. The country of Suriname achieved independence from the Kingdom of the Netherlands on 25 November 1975.

== List of governors ==
Italics indicate de facto continuation of office

Tenure	Portrait	Incumbent	Notes
English Suzerainty
English colony
1650 to 1654		Anthony Rowse, Governor	
1654 to 27 February 1667		William Byam, Governor	
Dutch Suzerainty
Dutch colony
27 February 1667 to 18 October 1667		Maurits de Rama, Governor	
18 October 1667 to 3 November 1667		John Harman, Governor	
3 November 1667 to 1 February 1668		Samuel Barry, Governor	
1668 to 18 June 1669		Abraham Crijnssen, acting Governor	
1669 to 1671		Philip Lichtenberg, Governor	
1671 to 1677		Pierre Versterre, acting Governor	
1677		Abel Thisso, acting Governor	
1677 to 1678		Tobias Adriaensen, Governor	
1678 to April 1680		Johannes Heinsius, Governor	
1680		Everhard van Hemert, acting Governor	
1680 to 1683		Laurens Verboom, acting Governor	
1683 to 19 July 1688		Cornelis van Aerssen van Sommelsdijck, Governor	
1688 to 1689		Abraham van Vredenburgh, acting Governor	
1689 to 1696		Johan van Scharphuizen, Governor	
14 May 1696 to 2 March 1707		Paulus van der Veen, Governor	
2 March 1707 to 27 September 1707		William de Gruyter, Governor	
27 September 1707 to 19 January 1710		François Anthony de Rayneval, acting Governor	1st time
19 January 1710 to 28 July 1715		Johan de Goyer, Governor	
28 July 1715 to 22 January 1716		François Anthony de Rayneval, acting Governor	2nd time
22 January 1716 to 4 October 1717		Johan de Mahony, Governor	
4 October 1717 to 2 March 1718		François Anthony de Rayneval, acting Governor	3rd time
2 March 1718 to 4 September 1721		Jan Coetier, Governor	
4 September 1721 to 1 March 1722		François Anthony de Rayneval, acting Governor	4th time
1 March 1722 to 17 September 1727		Hendrik Temminck, Governor-General	
17 September 1727 to 9 November 1728		François Anthony de Rayneval, acting Governor-General	5th time
9 November 1728 to 26 January 1734		Karel Emilius Henry de Cheusses, Governor-General	
26 January 1734 to 11 December 1734		Johan Fredrik Cornelis de Vries, acting Governor-General	1st time
11 December 1734 to 26 January 1735		Jacob Alexander Henry de Cheusses, Governor-General	
26 January 1735 to 4 March 1735		Johan Fredrik Cornelis de Vries, acting Governor-General	2nd time
4 March 1735 to 22 December 1735	Council		
22 December 1735 to 11 August 1737		Johan Raye van Breukelerwaard, Governor-General	
11 August 1737 to 15 October 1742		Gerrit van de Schepper, Governor-General	
15 October 1742 to 23 April 1751		Jan Jacob Mauricius, Governor-General	
23 April 1751 to 7 September 1752		Hendrik Ernst baron van Spörcke, acting Governor-General	
7 September 1752 to 22 October 1754		Wigbold Crommelin, acting Governor-General	1st time
22 October 1754 to 24 August 1756		Pieter Albert van der Meer, Governor-General	
24 August 1756 to 21 January 1757		Jan Nepveu, acting Governor-General	1st time
21 January 1757 to 22 November 1768		Wigbold Crommelin, Governor-General	Acting to 20 September 1757, 2nd time
22 November 1768 to 27 February 1779		Jan Nepveu, Governor-General	Acting to 8 March 1770, 2nd time
27 February 1779 to 23 September 1783		Bernard Texier, Governor-General	
23 September 1783 to 24 December 1784		Wolphert Jacob Beeldsnijder Matroos, acting Governor-General	
24 December 1784 to 15 June 1790		Jan Gerhard Wichers, Governor-General	Appointed "Gouverneur over Suriname en kolonel van de Militie" by the States General on 26 April 1784
15 June 1790 to 20 August 1799		Juriaan François Friderici, Governor-General	Acting to 24 August 1792
British Occupation
20 August 1799 to 4 December 1802		Juriaan François Friderici, Governor-General	
Dutch Suzerainty
4 December 1802 to 9 December 1803		Willem Otto Blois van Treslong, acting Governor-General	
9 December 1803 to 9 May 1804		Pierre de Berranger, Commissioner-General	
British Occupation
9 May 1804 to 15 April 1805		Sir Charles Green, Governor-General	
15 April 1805 to 27 September 1808		William Carlyon Hughes, Lieutenant Governor	
27 September 1808 to 4 May 1809		Sir John Wardlau Bar, acting Governor-General	
4 May 1809 to 8 November 1811		Charles Ferdinand Bentinck, Chief Commissioner	
8 November 1811 to 27 February 1816		Pinson Bonham, acting Governor-General	
Dutch Suzerainty
27 February 1816 to 18 July 1816		Willem van Panhuys, Governor-General	
18 July 1816 to 1 April 1822		Cornelis Vaillant, Governor-General	
1 April 1822 to 12 October 1827		Abraham de Veer, Governor-General	
12 October 1827 to 1 August 1828		Johannes van den Bosch, Commissioner-General	
United with Curaçao and Dependencies as Dutch Caribbean
1 August 1828 to 19 December 1831		Paulus Roelof Cantz'laar, Governor-General	
19 December 1831 to 5 June 1838		Evert Ludolph baron van Heeckeren, Governor-General	Acting to 6 May 1832
5 June 1838 to 16 July 1839		Philippus de Kanter, acting Governor-General	1st time
16 July 1839 to 31 March 1842		Julius Constantijn Rijk, Governor-General	
31 March 1842 to 15 November 1842		Philippus de Kanter, acting Governor-General	2nd time
15 November 1842 to 16 July 1845		Burchard Joan Elias, Governor-General	
16 July 1845 to 13 October 1845		Philippus de Kanter, acting Governor-General	3rd time
13 October 1845 to 27 January 1848		Reinier Frederik baron van Raders, Governor-General	
Separate colony
27 January 1848 to 1 March 1852		Reinier Frederik baron van Raders, Governor-General	
1 March 1852 to 14 June 1852		Philippus de Kanter, acting Governor-General	4th time
14 June 1852 to 22 June 1852		Coenrad Barends, acting Governor-General	
22 June 1852 to 25 August 1855		Johann George Otto Stuart von Schmidt auf Altenstadt, Governor-General	
25 August 1855 to 11 August 1859		Charles Pierre Schimpf, Governor-General	
11 August 1859 to 29 June 1867		Reinhart Frans van Lansberge, Governor-General	
29 June 1867 to 1 August 1873		Willem Hendrik Johan van Idsinga, Governor-General	
1 August 1873 to 1 November 1882		Cornelis Ascanius van Sypesteyn, Governor-General	
1 November 1882 to 30 July 1885		Johannes Herbert August Willem van Heerdt tot Eversberg, Governor-General	
30 July 1885 to 18 July 1888		Hendrik Jan Smidt, Governor-General	
18 July 1888 to 30 January 1889		Warmolt Tonckens, acting Governor-General	1st time
30 January 1889 to 27 June 1891		Maurits Adriaan de Savornin Lohman, Governor-General	
27 June 1891 to 12 May 1896		Titus Anthony Jacob van Asch van Wijck, Governor-General	
12 May 1896 to 4 October 1902		Warmolt Tonckens, Governor-General	2nd time
4 October 1902 to 12 September 1905		Cornelis Lely, Governor-General	
12 September 1905 to 18 November 1905		David Hendrick Havelaar, acting Governor-General	
18 November 1905 to 28 February 1908		Alexander Willem Frederik Idenburg, Governor-General	
28 February 1908 to 10 August 1908		Pieter Hofstede Crull, acting Governor-General	1st time
10 August 1908 to 30 June 1911		Dirk Fock, Governor-General	
30 June 1911 to 14 July 1911		Louis Marie Rollin Couquerque, Governor-General	
14 July 1911 to 17 October 1911		Pieter Hofstede Crull, acting Governor-General	2nd time
17 October 1911 to 25 November 1916		Willem Dirk Hendrik baron van Asbeck, Governor-General	
25 November 1916 to 25 November 1919		Gerard Johan Staal, Governor-General	1st time
25 November 1919 to 15 July 1920		Lambertus Johannes Rietberg, Governor-General	1st time
15 July 1920 to 16 December 1920		Gerard Johan Staal, Governor-General	2nd time
16 December 1920 to 23 May 1921		Lambertus Johannes Rietberg, Governor-General	2nd time
23 May 1921 to 21 May 1924		Aarnoud van Heemstra, Governor-General	1st time
21 May 1924 to 18 September 1924		Lambertus Johannes Rietberg, Governor-General	3rd time
18 September 1924 to 21 February 1925		Jan Luchies Nysingh, Governor-General	
21 February 1925 to 1 April 1928		Aarnoud van Heemstra, Governor-General	2nd time
1 April 1928 to 16 August 1933		Abraham Arnold Lodewijk Rutgers, Governor-General	
16 August 1933 to 3 January 1944		Johannes Coenraad Kielstra, Governor-General	
16 August 1935 to 12 April 1936		Johannes Cornelis Brons, acting Governor-General	Acting for Kielstra, 1st time
September 1938 to January 1939		Johannes Cornelis Brons, acting Governor-General	Acting for Kielstra, 2nd time
3 January 1944 to 2 August 1948		Johannes Cornelis Brons, Governor-General	3rd time
2 August 1948 to 2 December 1949		Willem Huender, Governor-General	
2 December 1949 to 15 December 1954		Jan Klaasesz, Governor-General	
Constituent country of the Kingdom of the Netherlands; end of colonial status
15 December 1954 to 11 February 1956		Jan Klaasesz, Governor-General	
11 February 1956 to 18 March 1963		Jan van Tilburg, Governor-General	
19 March 1963 to 22 August 1964		Archibald Currie, Governor-General	Acting to 1 May 1963
22 August 1964 to 26 February 1965		François Haverschmidt, acting Governor-General	
26 February 1965 to 12 August 1968		Henry Lucien de Vries, Governor-General	
12 August 1968 to 25 November 1975		Johan Ferrier, Governor-General	
25 November 1975	Independence as Republic of Suriname		

== See also ==
- Politics of Suriname
- President of Suriname
- First Lady of Suriname
- Vice President of Suriname
- List of prime ministers of Suriname
- List of deputy prime ministers of Suriname
