= Fort Nassau (Curaçao) =

Historic fort in Willemstad, Curaçao

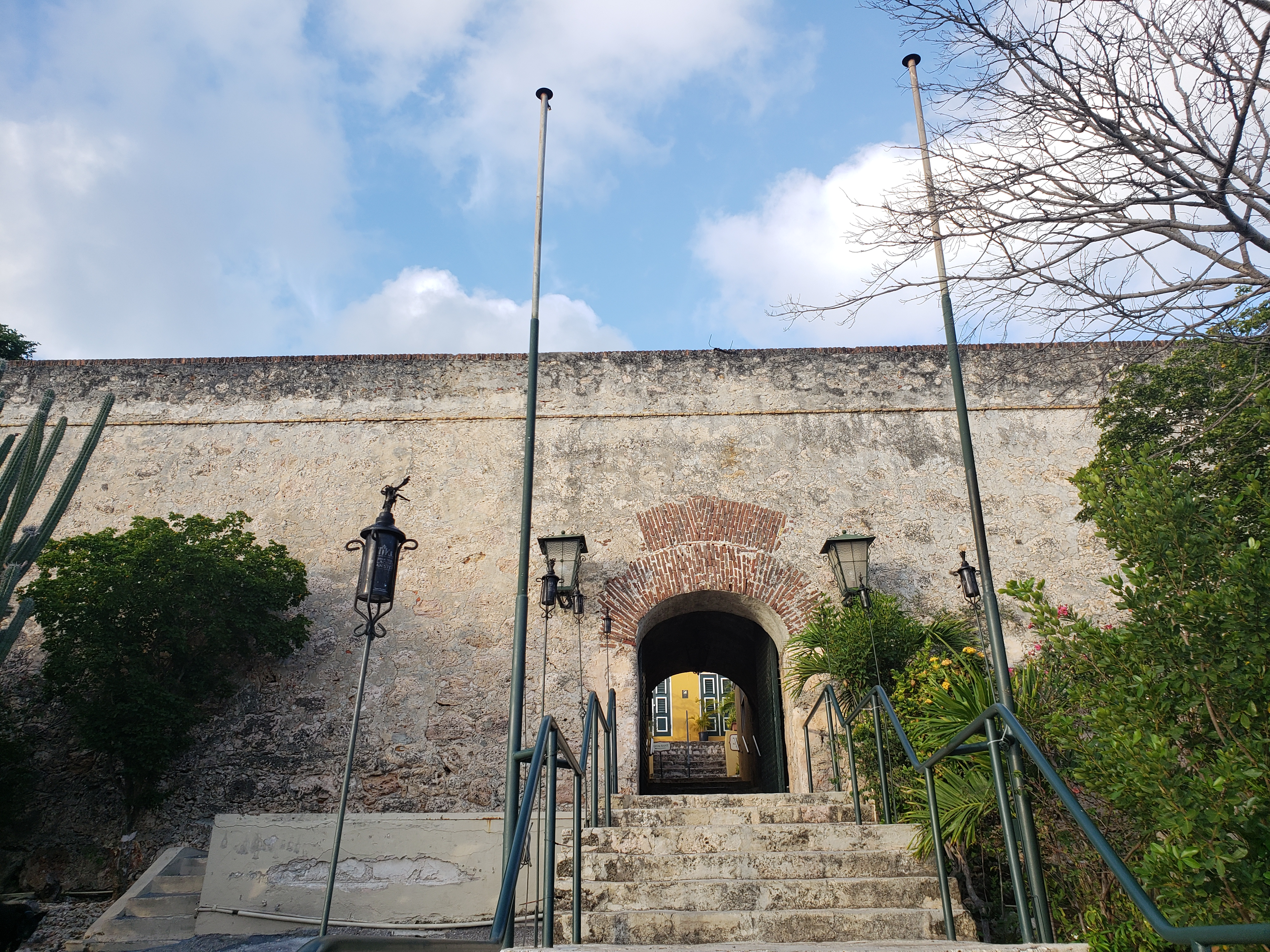
- Interactive map of the Fort Nassau area

General information
- Location: Willemstad, Curaçao
- Coordinates: 12.1148°N 68.9268°W
- Current tenants: Restaurant
- Construction started: 1796
- Inaugurated: 1797

Fort Nassau (officially: Fort Oranje Nassau) is a fort situated in Willemstad, Curaçao. It is located on a 68 metres (223 ft) high hill overlooking the city of Willemstad and its harbour. It was constructed in 1796 as Fort Republiek. In 1807, Curaçao was captured by the British, and the fort was renamed Fort George. In 1816, Curaçao was returned to Netherlands, and the fort received its current name. It lost its military function, but was used as a control tower for the Queen Emma Bridge. Since 1959, it is in use as a restaurant.

== History ==
In 1796, Johann Lauffer, commander of the Military Committee, and later governor of Curaçao, ordered the construction of Fort Republiek to protect Curaçao from attacks by the British Navy. The name republiek refers to the Batavian Republic. Seru Sablica was located on top of a hill overlooking the city of Willemstad and its harbour, and was deemed to best location to construct a fort, however the ground was part of plantation Knip. The fort was expensive at ƒ60,000, and the population was reluctant to supply the slaves for its construction. In late 1797, the fort was finished. The fort consists of a rectangular battery within a ring wall.

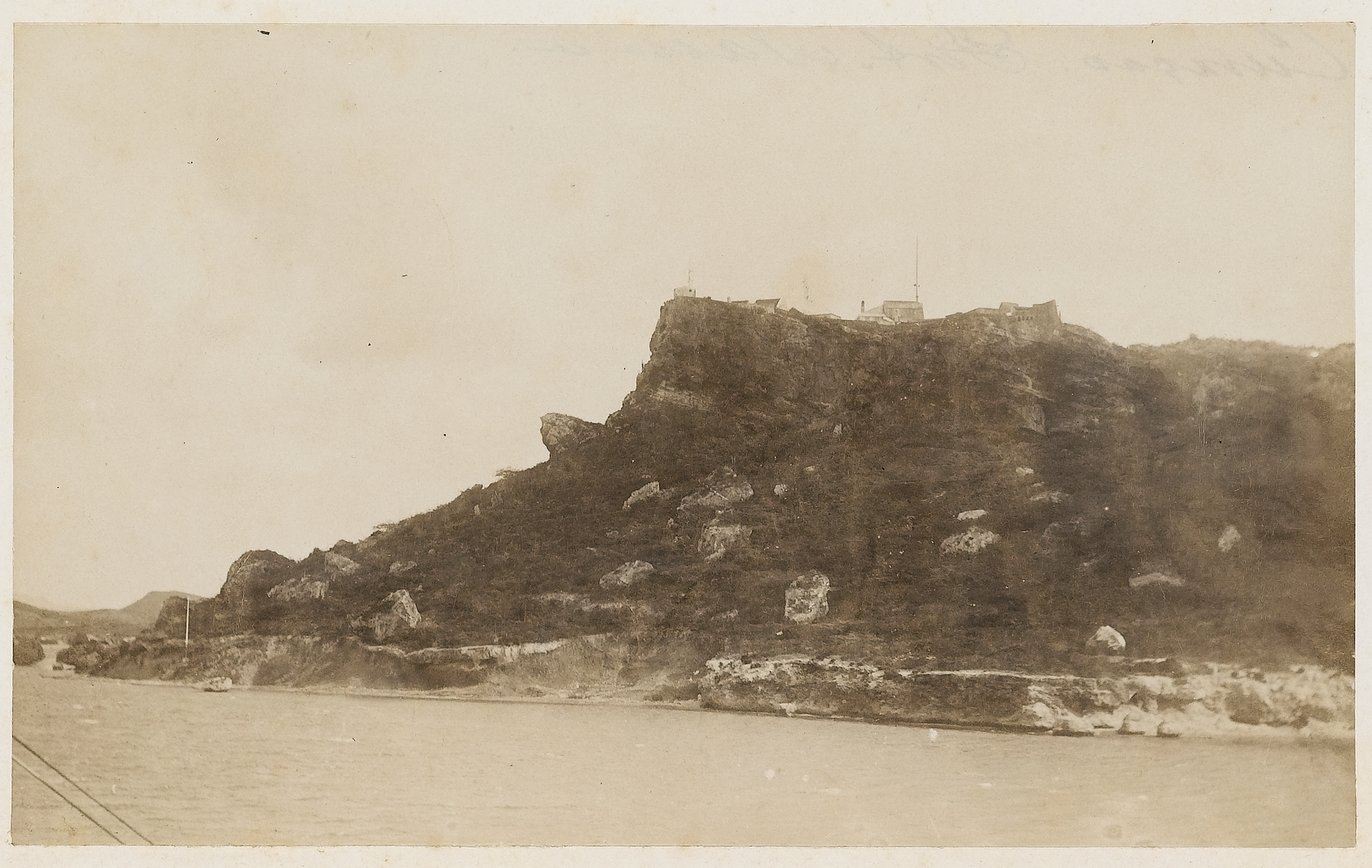
Fort Nassau (1890s)

In August 1800, French troops from Guadeloupe made a failed attempt to take the fort, and fled from the island on 22 September after an American warship arrived. In 1804, the British Navy commanded by Charles Brisbane tried to take Curaçao, however they came under attack from the fort, and had to retreat. Brisbane returned on the dawn of 1 January 1807 while the Dutch troops were sleeping or recovering from New Year's Eve, and managed to take the island. The fort was renamed Fort George.

In March 1815, it was decided by the Treaty of Paris to return of Curaçao to the Netherlands. The British left on 28 January 1816, and the fort was renamed Fort Oranje Nassau, however it was commonly referred to as Fort Nassau. In 1825, the fort lost its military purpose. It was used as a control tower for the Queen Emma Bridge. Since 1959, it is in use as a restaurant.
