= Charles Ferdinand Bentinck =

Surinamese politician

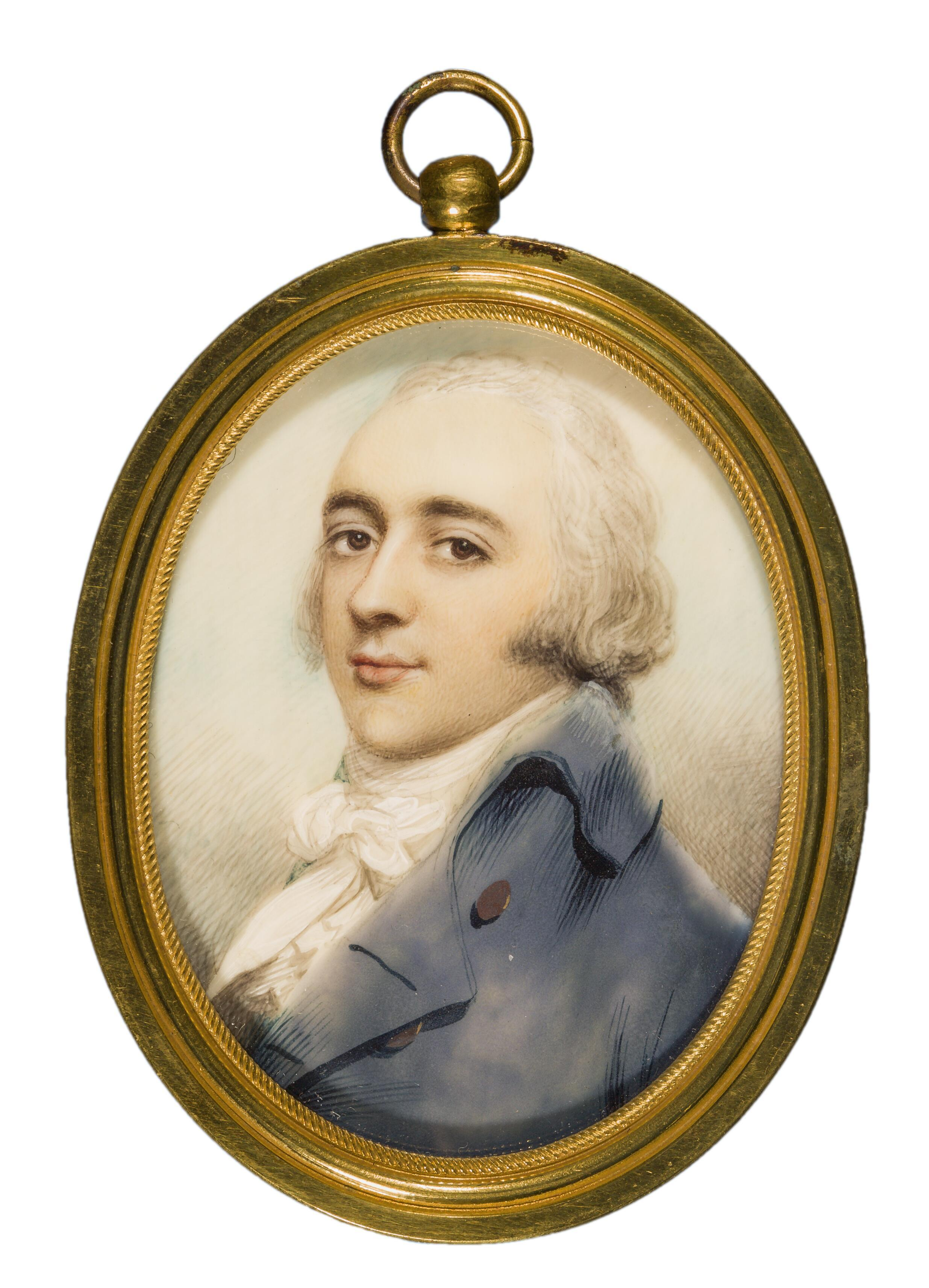

Governor of Suriname
- In office May 4, 1809 – November 8, 1811
- Preceded by: John Wardlau Bar
- Succeeded by: Pinson Bonham

Personal details
- Born: 20 August 1764 The Hague, Dutch Republic
- Died: 8 November 1811 (aged 47) Paramaribo, Surinam
- Occupation: military officer, governor

Charles Ferdinand Bentinck (20 August 1764 – 8 November 1811) was an Anglo-Dutch military officer and colonial governor. He served as Governor of Suriname from 1809 until his death in 1811.

== Biography ==
Bentinck was born in The Hague, Dutch Republic on 20 August 1764. He was a grandson of Willem Bentinck van Rhoon, and a relative of William Cavendish-Bentinck, 3rd Duke of Portland. In 1795, after the Batavian Revolution, he moved to Great-Britain where his grandfather lived. In 1804, he was a Major in the 2nd Yorkshire Regiment. The colony of Surinam had been taken by Britain, and it was decided to appoint a former Dutch citizen as the new governor.

On 2 May 1809, Bentinck arrived in Surinam, and was installed Governor of Suriname the next day. He was liked by the colonists. and solved complaints of the Free Negro Corps about their lack of pay, and complaints of the Ndyuka people who had not received their promised gifts. The British government was worried, and in 1810, dispatched Brigadier general Pinson Bonham to the colony. During his tenure, the Centrumkerk was built, and the first census was held, because earlier estimations were deemed unreliable.

Bentinck died on 8 November 1811, at the age of 47. After his death, a financial chaos and a large deficit was revealed. In 1814, a marble tomb was constructed in the Centrumkerk in his honour, however it was lost in the 1821 fire.

== Bibliography ==
- Einaar, Johan Friederich Egbert (1934). Bijdrage tot de kennis van het Engelsch tusschenbestuur van Suriname, 1804-1816 (Thesis) (in Dutch). Leiden: Dubbeldeman. p. 92.
- Wolbers, J. (1861). Geschiedenis van Suriname (in Dutch). Amsterdam: S. Emmerling. ISBN 90-6033-091-9.
