= Abraham George Ellis =

Dutch vice-admiral and politician

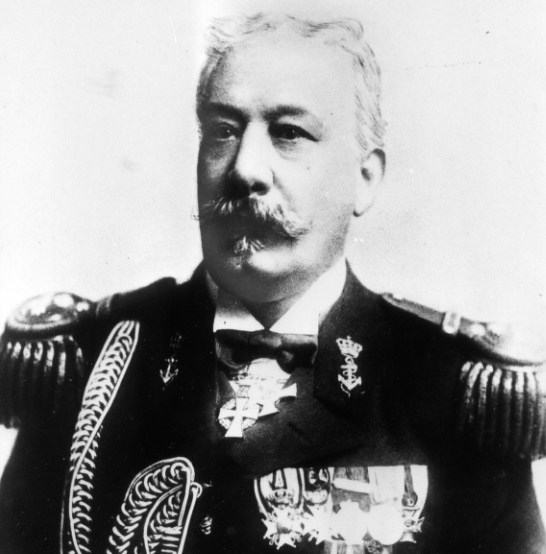
- Born: 26 August 1846; Paramaribo, Suriname
- Died: 29 November 1916 (aged 70); Amsterdam, Netherlands
- Occupations: Vice Admiral and politician

Abraham George Ellis (26 August 1846, Paramaribo – 29 November 1916, Amsterdam) was a Dutch Vice Admiral and politician. Born in Suriname of a mother born in slavery, he was the first Minister of African descent to serve in a Dutch cabinet.

== Early life ==
Ellis spent his early life in Suriname where he was born. His father was a wealthy civil servant, his mother was the daughter of a freed Surinamese slave. His father, Johannes Ellis (b. 1812), was the illegitimate child of Abraham de Veer, governor of the Dutch Gold Coast (in present-day Ghana) and his Ghanaian housekeeper Fanny Ellis. When Abraham was appointed governor of Sint Eustatius in 1817, he took Johannes with him. In 1822, when he was made governor of Suriname, again he took Johannes along. Johannes' mother, Maria Louisa de Hart (b. 1826) was born in bondage. Her father, a Jewish plantation owner named Mozes-Meijer de Hart had purchased her family's freedom when she had been just a few months old. In 1860 Ellis left Suriname with his parents and four younger sisters and moved to Amsterdam, Netherlands.

== Career ==
=== Navy ===
Ellis graduated from the Royal Netherlands Naval College in Den Helder on 1 September 1864. He spent over forty years in the navy serving tours to the Dutch East Indies, New Guinea, China, South America and Japan. In between tours he worked ashore with the Naval Torpedo Service and the Personnel Department of the Navy. In June 1902, Ellis was promoted to Rear Admiral and appointed director of Willemsoord naval wharf and the Commander of the Den Helder defense line (Stelling Den Helder). There Ellis cracked down hard on the social democratic sailor's union, earning him a reputation as a "Devourer of Socialists" (Socialistenvreter).

=== Government (1903–1905) ===
Following the death of Gerhardus Kruys, the apolitical Ellis was made Minister of the Navy in the Kuyper government. His ministry was dominated by combating the rise of unionists within the navy and he saw little success. When the government sought a new Foreign Affairs Minister after the resignation of the Minister Robert Melvil van Lynden, Ellis served briefly as interim minister. Ellis resigned from the Navy at the rank of Vice-admiral on 1 December 1905 due to heart problems.

=== Retirement ===
On 16 August 1905, less than two days after the end of his term in government, Queen Wilhelmina appointed Ellis as her special adjutant. He remained closely associated to the navy and marine business interests and later died from a heart attack in November 1916 during a board meeting of the Colonial Rubber Company in Amsterdam.

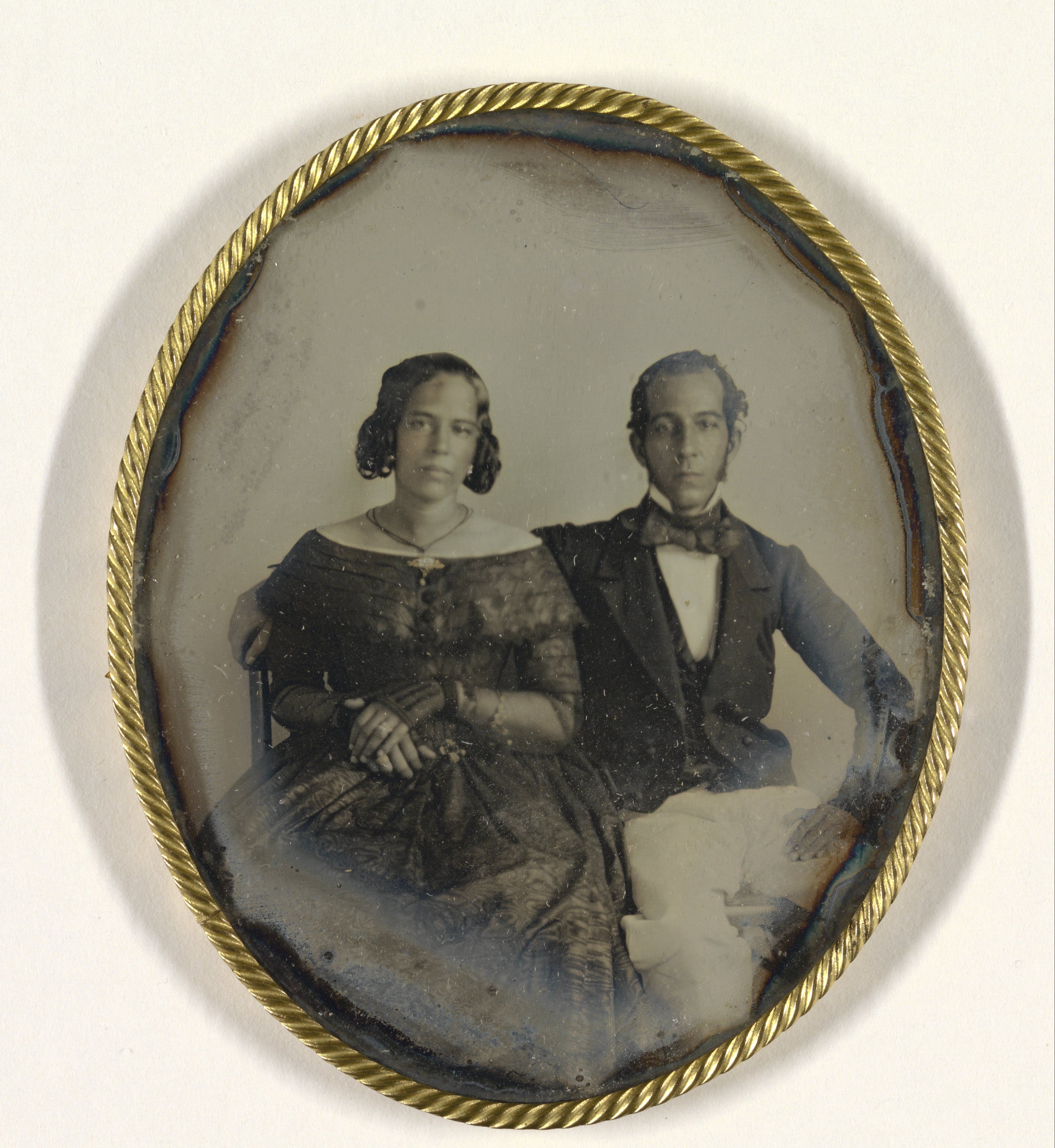
Mary Louise Hart (pregnant) and Johannes Ellis, Suriname, 1846

== Personal life ==
In 1889 Ellis married Elisabeth Maria Anna (1861–1943) the daughter of his former superior, Vice Admiral Johann Willem Binkes. The marriage remained childless.

== Honors ==
Ellis was a Commander of the Order of the Dutch Lion. He was also closely involved in the creation of the Royal Dutch Navy association 'Our Fleet' (Onze Vloot) which he was a president of until 1913.

== Trivia ==
A photograph of his parents in 1846 is the earliest known daguerreotype made in Suriname.
