= Paulus Roelof Cantz'laar =

Dutch naval officer and colonial governor (1771-1831)

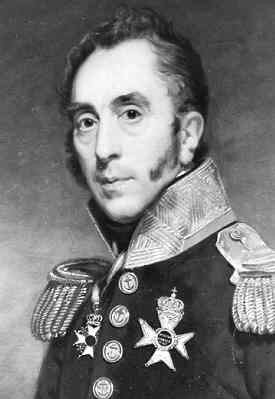

Governor of the Dutch West Indies
- In office 20 May 1828 – 15 December 1831
- Preceded by: office created
- Succeeded by: Evert van Heeckeren

Governor of Curaçao and Dependencies
- In office 16 November 1820 – April 1828
- Preceded by: Isaäc Elsevier
- Succeeded by: office disestablished

Personal details
- Born: 22 November 1771 Amsterdam, Netherlands
- Died: 15 December 1831 (aged 60) Paramaribo, Surinam

Paulus Roelof Cantz'laar (22 November 1771 – 15 December 1831) was a Dutch naval officer and colonial governor. He served as Governor of Curaçao and Dependencies from 16 November 1820 until April 1828, and Governor of the Dutch West Indies from 20 May 1828 to 15 December 1831.

== Biography ==
Cantz'laar was born on 22 November 1771 in Amsterdam, Dutch Republic. He joined the navy in 1790 as midshipman and was promoted to lieutenant in 1793. In 1795 the entire service of sea officers was dismissed and he rejoined the navy of the Batavian Republic in 1799. He was promoted to first lieutenant on 23 August 1800 and to captain lieutenant on 23 November 1804. In 1808 he got the title of lieutenant colonel. After a sea battle on 21 October 1813, he was taken to England as a prisoner of war. After the November revolution, the French rule of the Netherlands ended, and Catlz'laar was released.

In 1814 Cantz'laar was named captain and commander of a battalion of marines he raised that same year. In 1815 he was named governor of Sint Maarten and Saba, of which he took control on 6 January 1816. He would remain here until 1820, when he was promoted schout-bij-nacht. On 16 November 1820, he was appointed governor of Curaçao and Dependencies and served until April 1828. On 20 May 1828, he became the first governor-general of the combined Dutch West Indian possession, and left for Paramaribo.

Cantz'laar died on 15 December 1831 in Paramaribo, at the age of 60.
