= Alfonsdorp =

Alfonsdorp Tibiti
- Village
- Location in Suriname
- Coordinates: 5.553056°N 54.162222°W
- Country: Suriname
- District: Marowijne District
- Resort: Albina

Government
  - Captain: Margriet Biswane

Population
  - Total: 315

Alfonsdorp (Lokono: Tibiti) is a village of Indigenous Lokono people in the Albina resort of the Marowijne District of Suriname. The village is located on the East-West Link. The Wanekreek Nature Reserve is located near the village.

== Overview ==
Alfonsdorp has been named after their former village chief Alfons. During the Surinamese Interior War, the village was caught between the Suriname National Army and the Jungle Commando. Most of the village fled to Balaté near Saint-Laurent-du-Maroni, French Guiana. On 29 november 1986, when Moiwana was attacked by the Army, civilians were murdered in Alfonsdorp as well, and the village was destroyed. After a meeting with Thomas Sabajo of the Tucayana Amazonas and Ronnie Brunswijk of the Jungle Commando their safety was assured, and people started to return to their former home.

The village has a school. There used to be a clinic, but as of 2014, it was no longer in operation. In 2018, a catholic church was constructed. An ecotourism resort is located in the village. In 2014, Margriet Biswane was elected village chief. In August 2021, Alfonsdorp was connected to the electricity grid and received 24 hours of electricity.

== Wanekreek Nature Reserve ==
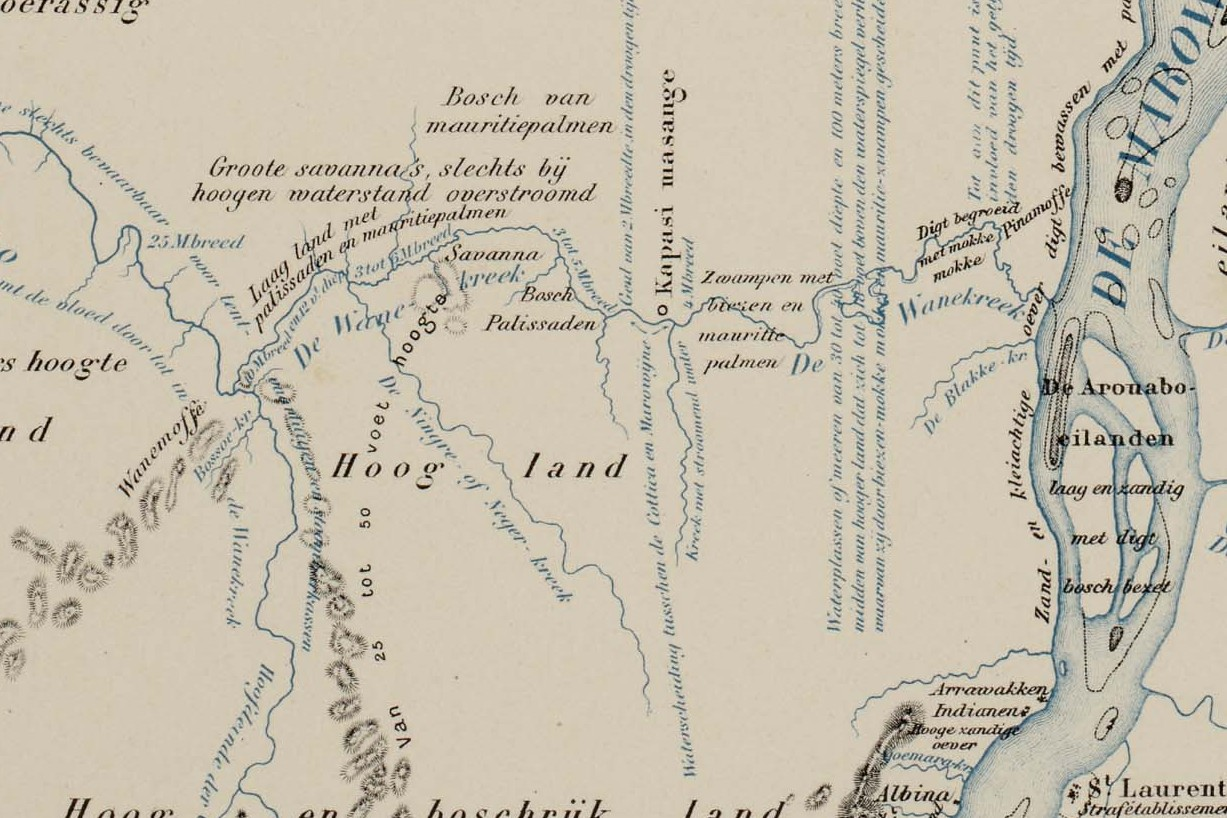
Wane Creek connecting the Cottica River (left) with the Marowijne River (right)

Wanekreek is a protected area of Suriname. It measures 45,000 ha (110,000 acres) and contains swamps, savannas, and marsh forests. It has been protected since 1986. The area is rich in wildlife, and is the breeding grounds for orange-winged amazons.

The Wane Creek which lends its name to the nature reserve, connects the Marowijne with the Cottica River and was part of the inland waterway between the Marowijne and Paramaribo. A large bauxite concession is located near the nature reserve.

The nature reserve is in an ongoing dispute with the indigenous villages of Marijkedorp and Alfonsdorp who consider it part of their hunting and fishing grounds. The area however has been uninhibited since the 1950s.

== Bibliography ==
- Ouboter, Paul E. (2001). "Directory of protected areas of Suriname". IBER.
- Plan Bureau (2014). "Planning Office Suriname - Districts 2009-2013" (PDF). Planning Office Suriname (in Dutch).
