= Indigenous peoples in Suriname =

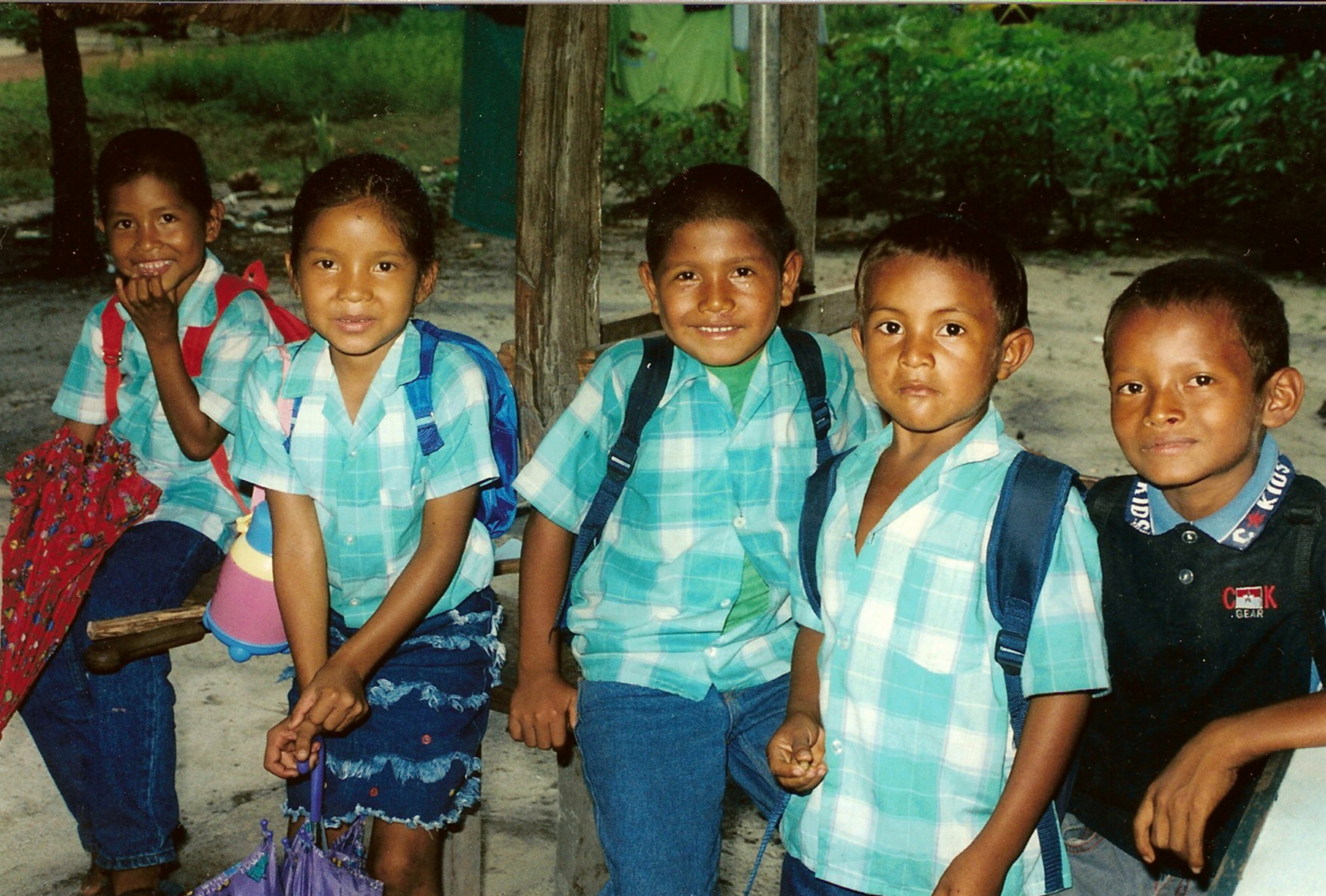
- Schoolchildren of the Kali'na community at Bigi Poika

Total population
- 20,344 (2012); 3.8% of Suriname's population

Regions with significant populations
- Paramaribo, Wanica, Para, Marowijne, Sipaliwini

Languages
- Indigenous languages, Sranan Tongo, Dutch

Religion
- Native American religion, Christianity, others

The Indigenous peoples in Suriname or Native Surinamese are the various Indigenous peoples native to the territory of present-day Suriname. The four most numerous Indigenous peoples are the Kaliña (Carib), Lokono (Arawak), Tiriyó (Trio) and Wayana. Smaller Indigenous peoples, mainly in the interior of the country, include the Akurio, Warao, Apalaí, Wai-wai, Mawayana and several others.

According to the 2012 census, 20,344 people, or 3.8% of the population, identified as Indigenous. The Kaliña and Lokono live mainly in northern Suriname, while the Tiriyó, Wayana and other Amazonian Indigenous peoples predominantly inhabit the interior in the south.

Indigenous peoples inhabited the territory before European colonisation and played a significant role in the early colonial history of Suriname. Contemporary issues affecting Indigenous communities include access to public services, exploitation of natural resources and the legal recognition of collective rights to traditional lands.

== Peoples ==
Suriname's Indigenous population consists of several distinct peoples with their own identities, languages and cultural traditions. The four most numerous are the Kaliña, Lokono, Tiriyó and Wayana. Smaller peoples include the Akurio, Apalaí, Wai-wai, Mawayana, Sikiana and Warao, among others.

Several of Suriname's Indigenous peoples also have communities in neighbouring Guyana, French Guiana and Brazil, reflecting settlement patterns and cultural regions that extend across the modern borders of the Guianas.

== History ==
=== Before European colonisation ===
Indigenous peoples inhabited the Guianas for thousands of years before European arrival. The populations encountered by Europeans belonged to different linguistic and cultural groups and maintained networks of trade, migration, warfare and political alliances across the Guianas and Amazonian region.

European activity along the coast and rivers increased during the 17th century. A permanent English colony was established in 1650, before the Dutch took control of Suriname in 1667.

=== Colonial period ===
In 1678, Indigenous groups began a major armed conflict against the colony, known in Surinamese historiography as the Indianenoorlog ("Indigenous War"). Indigenous forces attacked plantations and seriously disrupted the young plantation colony. Kaliña leaders from the Coppename and Saramacca regions played a prominent role in the resistance.

Governor Cornelis van Aerssen van Sommelsdijck reached peace with Indigenous opponents of the colony in 1686. Although the text of the agreement has not survived, the settlement recognised the Indigenous peoples covered by it as free people who were not to be enslaved merely because of their Indigenous status. Some Indigenous groups subsequently became allies of the colonial authorities.

During the 18th century, relations between Indigenous peoples, Maroon communities and the colonial authorities varied between cooperation and conflict. Some Indigenous groups served the colonial government as scouts and auxiliaries against Maroons, while others assisted or formed alliances with Maroon communities. Indigenous involvement in colonial affairs became increasingly intermittent during the first half of the century.

=== Twentieth century and independence ===
Indigenous societies in southern Suriname followed a different historical trajectory, as the remoteness of the interior limited direct colonial control. Contact with the colonial government and other outsiders increased during the 20th century through expeditions, missionary activity and the construction of airstrips and other infrastructure. Among the Tiriyó, missionary activity contributed to the concentration of formerly dispersed populations into larger settlements.

The Akurio were among the last Indigenous peoples in Suriname to experience sustained outside contact. Beginning in the late 1960s, Akurio families eventually settled principally among Tiriyó communities.

Suriname became independent from the Netherlands in 1975. During the Surinamese Interior War (1986–1992), Indigenous communities were affected by the conflict and some Indigenous people became directly involved. In 1989, the armed Tucayana Amazonas movement emerged following Indigenous opposition to the Treaty of Kourou, a ceasefire agreement between the government and the Jungle Commando. The movement expressed demands including land rights, a share in revenues from natural resources, recognition of Indigenous culture and greater political participation.

Following the end of the war in 1992, Indigenous village leaders established the Vereniging van Inheemse Dorpshoofden in Suriname (VIDS; Association of Indigenous Village Leaders in Suriname), seeking to restore and strengthen traditional village authority and Indigenous representation.

== Demographics and distribution ==
According to the 2012 census, 20,344 people in Suriname identified as Indigenous, representing approximately 3.8% of the country's population.

The Indigenous population is distributed unevenly across the country. The Kaliña and Lokono live predominantly in northern Suriname, while the Tiriyó, Wayana and other Amazonian peoples live primarily in the sparsely populated southern interior. Indigenous people also form a significant urban population. According to census-based demographic data, 20.1% of Suriname's Indigenous population lived in Paramaribo.

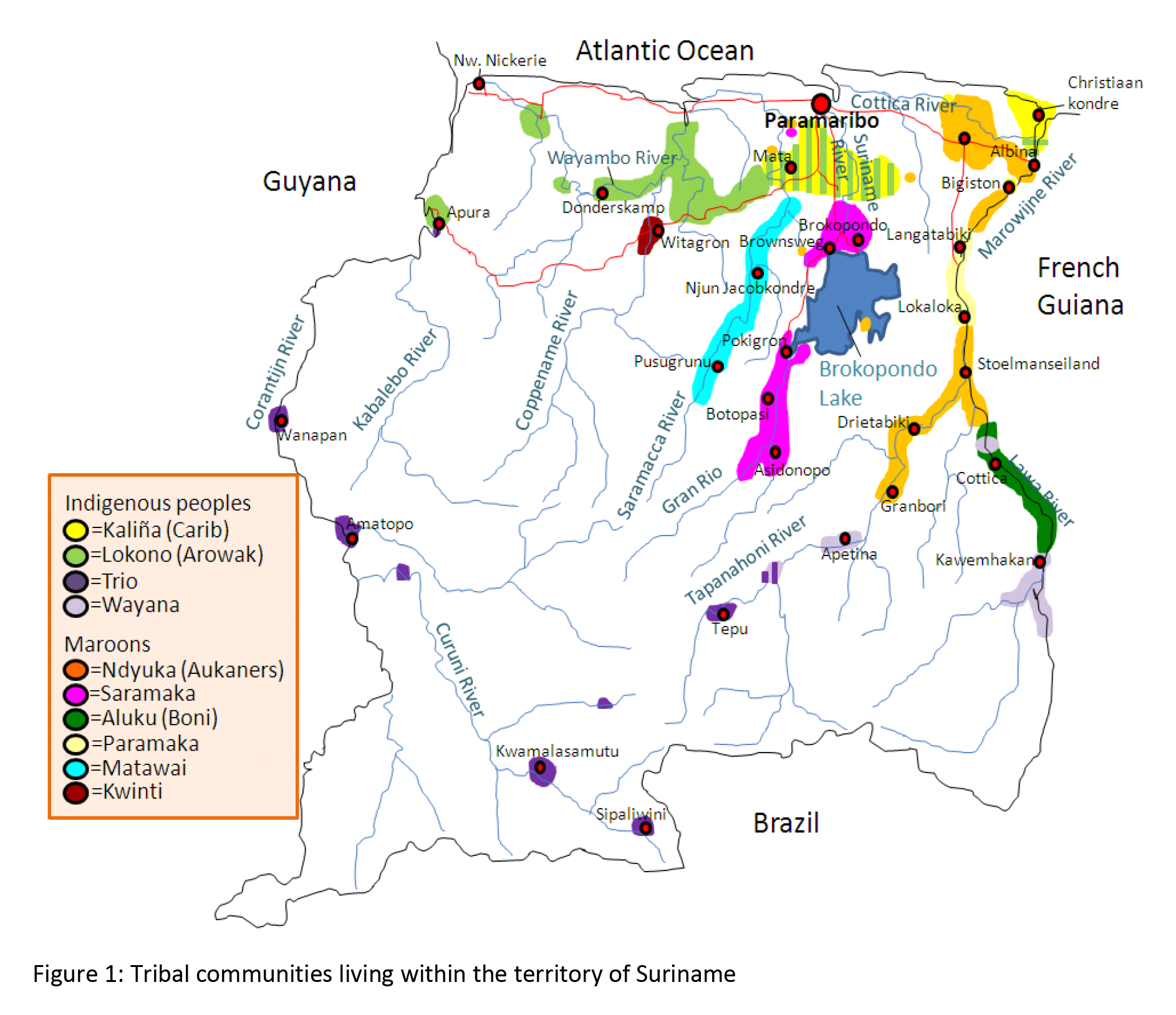
Distribution of Indigenous and Maroon communities in Suriname

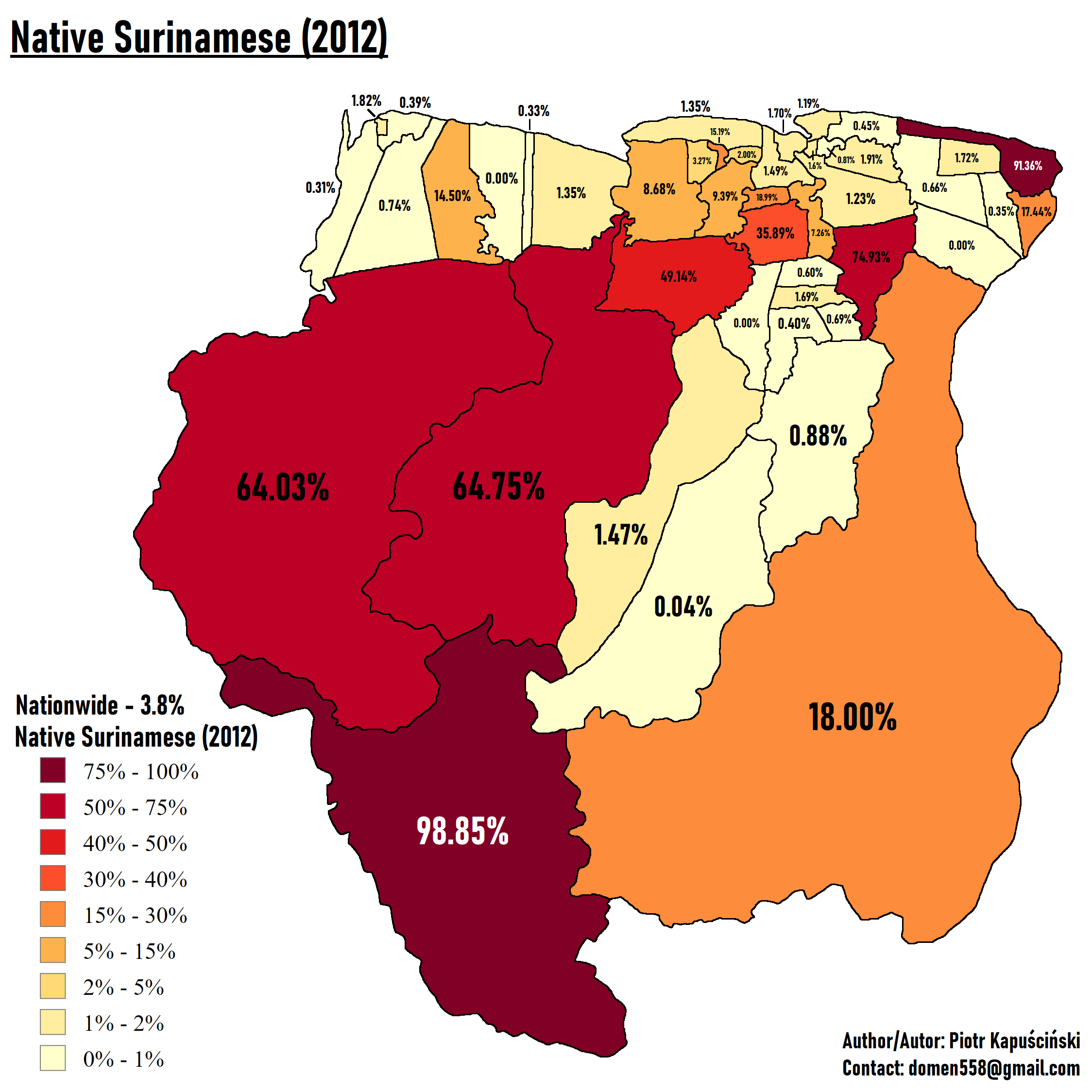
Distribution of Indigenous Surinamese by resort according to the 2012 census

== Languages and culture ==
Suriname's Indigenous languages include languages of the Cariban and Arawakan families. Kaliña, Tiriyó, Wayana and Akurio speak Cariban languages, while Lokono belongs to the Arawakan language family.

Sranan Tongo is widely used as a lingua franca between Suriname's different ethnic groups, alongside Dutch, the country's official language.

The cultures of Suriname's Indigenous peoples are diverse and do not constitute a single cultural tradition. Many communities, particularly in the interior, have traditionally depended on hunting, fishing and rotational agriculture and on forest resources for their livelihoods. Material culture includes pottery and objects made from natural materials such as plant fibres, seeds and feathers.

== Land and collective rights ==
Land rights are a major contemporary issue affecting Indigenous peoples in Suriname. Indigenous communities traditionally use territories collectively, while Surinamese law has historically provided limited recognition of collective Indigenous rights to traditional lands and resources.

Logging, mining, private land titles and other activities within traditional territories have contributed to Indigenous demands for legal recognition of collective land rights and of Indigenous communities as legal entities.

=== Inter-American human rights cases ===
Suriname has been the subject of decisions by the Inter-American Court of Human Rights concerning the territorial rights of Indigenous and tribal peoples. In Kaliña and Lokono Peoples v. Suriname, eight Kaliña and Lokono communities challenged the lack of legal recognition of their collective personality and traditional lands, as well as activities within territory claimed by the communities.

In its 2015 judgment, the Court held that Suriname had violated rights protected by the American Convention on Human Rights, including by failing to recognise the Kaliña and Lokono peoples' juridical personality and rights to collective property and judicial protection. The judgment required measures to recognise collective legal personality and to delimit, demarcate and grant collective title over traditional territory.

=== Land-rights legislation ===
Efforts to establish a statutory framework for collective land rights have continued. In February 2025, the Surinamese government announced amendments to the proposed Wet Collectieve Rechten Inheemse en Tribale Volken ("Collective Rights of Indigenous and Tribal Peoples Act"). The proposed framework includes procedures for recognising collective land rights and traditional governance systems.

== Organizations ==
Indigenous communities are represented nationally by organisations including the Vereniging van Inheemse Dorpshoofden in Suriname (VIDS; Association of Indigenous Village Leaders in Suriname). Established in 1992 following the Interior War, VIDS represents Indigenous village authorities and advocates on issues including collective and land rights.

== See also ==
- Demographics of Suriname
- Ethnic groups in Suriname
- History of Suriname
