= November 29 =

November 29 this year in various calendars
- Sunday, 29 November 2026
Akan	Kwakwasi
Armenian	12 Kʿaloch 1476
Aztec	Tlacaxipehualiztli 18, 12 Ozomahtli
Babylonian	18 Arakhsamna, 2337 SE
Balinese pawukon	Luang, Pepet, Beteng, Sri, Keliwon, Was, Redite of Taulu, Ludra, Tulus, Duka
Bengali	14 Ogrohayon, BS 1433
Chinese	Yin Fire Goat・Hairy Head Mansion; Fire Horse Year, Month 10, Day 21 (Xiaoxue, 8 days until Daxue)
Common Era	29 November 2026 CE
Coptic	20 Hathor, AM 1743
Egyptian	17 Pharmuthi, 2775 NE
Ethiopian	20 H̱edār, 2019 Amätä Məhrät
French Republican	Décade I, Octidi de Frimaire de l'Année 235 de la République
Gregorian	29 November, AD 2026
Hebrew	19 Kislev, AM 5787
Hindu	Puṣya・Śukla; Solar: 13 Mārgaśīrṣa, 1948 SE; Lunisolar: Pañcamī, Kṛishna pakṣa of Kārtika, 2083 VE; Rāudra・5127 KY・1,872,908
Icelandic	Sunnudagur, 7 Ýlir 2026
Islamic	18 Jumada al-thani, AH 1448 (using tabular method)
ISO week date	2026-W48-7
Japanese	21 Kannazuki, Reiwa 8 (Shōsetsu, 8 days until Taisetsu)
Julian	16 November, AD 2026 (AM 7535)
Julian day	2461374
Korean	21 Dwaejidal, 4359 DE
Maya	13.0.14.2.11; 4 Mac, 12 Chuen
Roman	ante diem XVI Kalendas Decembres, MMDCCLXXIX AUC
Solar Hijri	8 Azar, SH 1405
Tibetan	20 smin drug, me pho rta 2153 or 1772 or 1000

<<	November					>>
Su	Mo	Tu	We	Th	Fr	Sa
1	2	3	4	5	6	7
8	9	10	11	12	13	14
15	16	17	18	19	20	21
22	23	24	25	26	27	28
29	30
2026

November 29 in recent years
2025 (Saturday)
2024 (Friday)
2023 (Wednesday)
2022 (Tuesday)
2021 (Monday)
2020 (Sunday)
2019 (Friday)
2018 (Thursday)
2017 (Wednesday)
2016 (Tuesday)

November 29 is the 333rd day of the year (334th in leap years) in the Gregorian calendar; 32 days remain until the end of the year.

== Events ==
=== Pre-1600 ===
- 528 – Antioch suffers its second major earthquake in two years, killing thousands and destroying its remaining edifice.
- 561 – Following the death of King Chlothar I at Compiègne, his four sons, Charibert I, Guntram, Sigebert I and Chilperic I, divide the Frankish Kingdom.
- 618 – The Tang dynasty scores a decisive victory over their rival Xue Rengao at the Battle of Qianshuiyuan.
- 903 – The Abbasid army under Muhammad ibn Sulayman al-Katib defeats the Qarmatians at the Battle of Hama.
- 1114 – A large earthquake damages the areas of the Crusaders in the Middle East. Antioch, Mamistra, Marash and Edessa are hit by the shocks.
- 1549 – The papal conclave of 1549–50 begins.

=== 1601–1900 ===
- 1612 – The Battle of Swally takes place, which loosens the Portuguese Empire's hold on India.
- 1729 – Natchez Indians massacre 138 Frenchmen, 35 French women, and 56 children at Fort Rosalie, near the site of modern-day Natchez, Mississippi.
- 1732 – The magnitude 6.6 Irpinia earthquake causes 1,940 deaths in the former Kingdom of Naples, southern Italy.
- 1776 – During the American Revolutionary War, the Battle of Fort Cumberland, Nova Scotia, comes to an end with the arrival of British reinforcements.
- 1777 – San Jose, California, is founded as Pueblo de San José de Guadalupe by José Joaquín Moraga. It is the first civilian settlement, or pueblo, in Alta California.
- 1781 – The crew of the British slave ship Zong murders 54 Africans by dumping them into the sea to claim insurance, beginning the Zong massacre.
- 1783 – A 5.3 magnitude earthquake strikes New Jersey.
- 1807 – John VI of Portugal flees Lisbon from advancing Napoleonic forces during the Peninsular War, transferring the Portuguese court to Brazil.
- 1830 – An armed rebellion against Russia's rule in Poland begins.
- 1847 – The Sonderbund is defeated by the joint forces of other Swiss cantons under General Guillaume-Henri Dufour.
- 1847 – Missionaries Dr. Marcus Whitman, his wife Narcissa, and 15 others are killed by Cayuse and Umatilla Indians, causing the Cayuse War.
- 1850 – The treaty, Punctation of Olmütz, is signed in Olomouc. Prussia capitulates to Austria, which will take over the leadership of the German Confederation.
- 1863 – American Civil War: Union forces under General Ambrose Burnside successfully defend Knoxville, Tennessee from an attack by Confederate forces under General James Longstreet in the Battle of Fort Sanders during the Siege of Knoxville.
- 1864 – Colorado War: Colorado volunteers led by Colonel John Chivington massacre at least 150 Cheyenne and Arapaho noncombatants at Sand Creek inside Colorado Territory.
- 1864 – American Civil War: The Confederate Army of Tennessee misses an opportunity to crush the Union Army of the Ohio in the Battle of Spring Hill during the Franklin–Nashville campaign.
- 1872 – The Modoc War begins with the Battle of Lost River.
- 1877 – Thomas Edison demonstrates his phonograph for the first time.
- 1890 – The Meiji Constitution goes into effect in Japan, and the first Diet convenes.
- 1899 – FC Barcelona is founded by Catalan, Spanish and Englishmen. It later develops into one of Spanish and world football's most iconic and strongest teams.

=== 1901–present ===
- 1920 – The Armenian Revolutionary Committee declares Armenia to be a Soviet Socialist Republic, starting 71 years of Soviet rule in Armenia
- 1929 – U.S. Admiral Richard E. Byrd leads the first expedition to fly over the South Pole.
- 1943 – The second session of the Anti-Fascist Council for the National Liberation of Yugoslavia (AVNOJ), held to determine the post-war ordering of the country, concludes in Jajce (present-day Bosnia and Herzegovina).
- 1944 – Albania is liberated by the Partisans.
- 1945 – The Federal People's Republic of Yugoslavia is declared.
- 1947 – The United Nations General Assembly approve the United Nations Partition Plan for Palestine.
- 1947 – French forces carry out a massacre at Mỹ Trạch, Vietnam during the First Indochina War.
- 1952 – U.S. President-elect Dwight D. Eisenhower fulfills a campaign promise by traveling to Korea to find out what can be done to end the conflict.
- 1961 – Enos, a chimpanzee, is launched into space. The spacecraft orbits the Earth twice and splashes down off the coast of Puerto Rico.
- 1963 – U.S. President Lyndon B. Johnson establishes the Warren Commission to investigate the assassination of President John F. Kennedy.
- 1963 – Trans-Canada Air Lines Flight 831 crashes shortly after takeoff from Montreal-Dorval International Airport, killing all 118 people on board.
- 1963 – "I Want to Hold Your Hand", recorded on October 17, 1963, is released by the Beatles in the United Kingdom.
- 1967 – U.S. Secretary of Defense Robert McNamara announces his resignation.
- 1972 – Atari releases Pong, the first commercially successful video game.
- 1982 – Michael Jackson releases Thriller, the best-selling music album of all time.
- 1986 – The Surinamese military attacks the village of Moiwana during the Suriname Guerrilla War, killing at least 39 civilians, mostly women and children.
- 1987 – North Korean agents plant a bomb on Korean Air Flight 858, which kills all 115 passengers and crew.
- 2007 – The Armed Forces of the Philippines lay siege to the Peninsula Manila after soldiers led by Senator Antonio Trillanes stage a mutiny.
- 2009 – Maurice Clemmons shoots and kills four police officers inside a coffee shop in Lakewood, Washington.
- 2013 – LAM Mozambique Airlines 470 crashes in the Bwabata National Park in a pilot mass murder-suicide, killing all 33 people on board.
- 2025 – The Government of Jordan officially announces the launch of the Amra City development project during a site visit by the Prime Minister.

== Births ==
=== Pre-1600 ===
- 826 – William of Septimania, Frankish nobleman (died 850)
- 1310 – John de Mowbray, 3rd Baron Mowbray, English Baron (died 1361)
- 1338 – Lionel of Antwerp, 1st Duke of Clarence, Belgian-English politician, Lord Lieutenant of Ireland (died 1368)
- 1422 – Thomas Percy, 1st Baron Egremont, English Baron (died 1460)
- 1463 – Andrea della Valle, Italian cardinal (died 1534)
- 1528 – Anthony Browne, 1st Viscount Montagu, English politician (died 1592)

=== 1601–1900 ===
- 1627 – John Ray, English biologist and botanist (died 1705)
- 1690 – Christian August, Prince of Anhalt-Zerbst (died 1747)
- 1705 – Michael Christian Festing, English violinist and composer (died 1752)
- 1752 – The Public Universal Friend, American evangelist (died 1819)
- 1762 – Pierre André Latreille, French zoologist (died 1833)
- 1781 – Andrés Bello, Venezuelan poet and philosopher (died 1865)
- 1797 – Gaetano Donizetti, Italian composer (died 1848)
- 1798 – Alexander Brullov, Russian painter and architect, designed the Pulkovo Observatory (died 1877)
- 1798 – Hamilton Rowan Gamble, American jurist and politician (died 1864)
- 1799 – Amos Bronson Alcott, American philosopher and academic (died 1888)
- 1802 – Wilhelm Hauff, German poet and author (died 1827)
- 1803 – Christian Doppler, Austrian mathematician and physicist (died 1853)
- 1803 – Gottfried Semper, German architect and academic, designed the Semper Opera House (died 1879)
- 1816 – Morrison Waite, American jurist and politician, 7th Chief Justice of the United States (died 1888)
- 1817 – William Ellery Channing, American poet and author (died 1901)
- 1818 – George Brown, Scottish-Canadian journalist and politician, 10th Premier of West Canada (died 1880)
- 1823 – La Fayette Grover, American lawyer and politician, 4th Governor of Oregon (died 1911)
- 1825 – Jean-Martin Charcot, French neurologist and psychologist (died 1893)
- 1827 – William Crichton, Scottish engineer and shipbuilder (died 1889)
- 1831 – Frederick Townsend Ward, American sailor and soldier (died 1862)
- 1832 – Louisa May Alcott, American novelist and poet (died 1888)
- 1835 – Empress Dowager Cixi of China (died 1908)
- 1843 – Gertrude Jekyll, British horticulturist and writer (died 1932)
- 1849 – John Ambrose Fleming, English physicist and engineer (died 1945)
- 1856 – Theobald von Bethmann Hollweg, German lawyer and politician, 5th Chancellor of Germany (died 1921)
- 1857 – Theodor Escherich, German-Austrian pediatrician and academic (died 1911)
- 1861 – Spyridon Samaras, Greek composer (died 1917)
- 1873 – Suzan Rose Benedict, American mathematician and academic (died 1942)
- 1874 – Francis Dodd, Welsh-English painter and academic (died 1949)
- 1874 – Egas Moniz, Portuguese physician and neurologist, Nobel Prize laureate (died 1955)
- 1876 – Nellie Tayloe Ross, American educator and politician, 14th Governor of Wyoming (died 1977)
- 1879 – Jacob Gade, Danish violinist and composer (died 1963)
- 1881 – Artur Phleps, Romanian-German general (died 1944)
- 1882 – Henri Fabre, French pilot and engineer (died 1984)
- 1891 – Julius Raab, Austrian engineer and politician, 19th Chancellor of Austria (died 1964)
- 1895 – Busby Berkeley, American director and choreographer (died 1976)
- 1895 – William Tubman, Liberian lawyer and politician, 19th President of Liberia (died 1971)
- 1898 – C. S. Lewis, British novelist, poet, and critic (died 1963)
- 1899 – Andrija Artuković, Croatian Minister of Interior (died 1988)
- 1899 – Emma Morano, Italian supercentenarian, oldest Italian person ever (died 2017)
- 1900 – Mildred Gillars, American broadcaster, employed by Nazi Germany to disseminate propaganda during WWII (died 1988)

=== 1901–present ===
- 1904 – Margaret Barr, Australian choreographer and teacher of dance-drama (died 1991)
- 1905 – Marcel Lefebvre, French-Swiss archbishop and theologian (died 1991)
- 1906 – Barbara C. Freeman, English writer and poet (died 1999)
- 1908 – Adam Clayton Powell Jr., American pastor and politician (died 1972)
- 1910 – Elizabeth Choy, Malaysian-Singaporean educator and politician (died 2006)
- 1910 – Antanas Škėma, Lithuanian actor and director (died 1961)
- 1915 – Ludu Daw Amar, Burmese journalist and author (died 2008)
- 1915 – Billy Strayhorn, American pianist and composer (died 1967)
- 1916 – Fran Ryan, American actress and comedian (died 2000)
- 1917 – Pierre Gaspard-Huit, French director and screenwriter (died 2017)
- 1917 – Merle Travis, American singer-songwriter and guitarist (died 1983)
- 1918 – Madeleine L'Engle, American author and poet (died 2007)
- 1919 – Mildred Rebstock, American medicinal chemist (died 2011)
- 1919 – Joe Weider, Canadian-American bodybuilder and publisher, co-founded the IFBB (died 2013)
- 1920 – Yegor Ligachyov, Russian engineer and politician (died 2021)
- 1920 – Joseph Shivers, American chemist and academic, developed spandex (died 2014)
- 1921 – Jackie Stallone, American astrologer and wrestling promoter (died 2020)
- 1922 – Michael Howard, English-American historian, author, and academic (died 2019)
- 1923 – Chuck Daigh, American race car driver (died 2008)
- 1925 – Minnie Miñoso, Cuban-American baseball player and coach (died 2015)
- 1926 – Beji Caid Essebsi, Tunisian lawyer and politician, President of Tunisia (died 2019)
- 1927 – Vin Scully, American sportscaster and game show host (died 2022)
- 1928 – Tahir Salahov, Azerbaijani painter and educator (died 2021)
- 1928 – Paul Simon, American soldier and politician, 39th Lieutenant Governor of Illinois (died 2003)
- 1929 – Derek Jameson, English journalist and radio host (died 2012)
- 1929 – Woo Yong-gak, North Korean soldier (died 2012)
- 1930 – Shirley Porter, English politician, Lord Mayor of Westminster
- 1930 – Vladimir Šenauer, Croatian footballer (died 2013)
- 1930 – Alan Lee Williams, English academic and politician
- 1931 – Shintaro Katsu, Japanese actor, singer, director, and producer (died 1997)
- 1932 – Ed Bickert, Canadian jazz guitarist (died 2019)
- 1932 – Jacques Chirac, French soldier and politician, 22nd President of France (died 2019)
- 1932 – John Gary, American singer and television host (died 1998)
- 1932 – Pierre Toubert, French historian (died 2025)
- 1933 – John Mayall, English singer-songwriter, guitarist, and producer (died 2024)
- 1933 – James Rosenquist, American painter and illustrator (died 2017)
- 1934 – Willie Morris, American writer (died 1999)
- 1935 – Thomas J. O'Brien, American bishop (died 2018)
- 1936 – Gregory Gillespie, American painter (died 2000)
- 1936 – Bill Jenkins, American politician
- 1937 – Eric Barnes, English footballer (died 2014)
- 1938 – Johnny Crossan, Northern Irish footballer, author and sports analyst
- 1939 – Peter Bergman, American comedian, actor and screenwriter (died 2012)
- 1939 – Meco, American record producer and musician (died 2023)
- 1940 – Denny Doherty, Canadian musician, singer, songwriter, and actor (died 2007)
- 1940 – Oscar Espinosa Chepe, Cuban-Spanish economist and journalist (died 2013)
- 1940 – Chuck Mangione, American horn player and composer (died 2025)
- 1940 – Janet Smith, English lawyer and judge
- 1940 – Henry T. Yang, Taiwanese/Chinese-American engineer and academic
- 1941 – Bill Freehan, American baseball player, coach, and sportscaster (died 2021)
- 1942 – Michael Craze, British actor (died 1998)
- 1942 – Ann Dunham, American anthropologist and academic (died 1995)
- 1942 – John Grillo, English actor and playwright
- 1943 – Bobbi Martin, American singer-songwriter and guitarist (died 2000)
- 1943 – Sue Miller, American novelist and short story writer
- 1944 – Felix Cavaliere, American singer-songwriter, pianist, and producer
- 1945 – Csaba Pléh, Hungarian psychologist and linguist
- 1946 – Suzy Chaffee, American skier
- 1946 – Silvio Rodríguez, Cuban singer-songwriter and guitarist
- 1947 – Petra Kelly, German activist and politician (died 1992)
- 1947 – Ronnie Montrose, American singer-songwriter, guitarist, and producer (died 2012)
- 1948 – Yōichi Masuzoe, Japanese politician
- 1949 – Jerry Lawler, American wrestler and sportscaster
- 1949 – Garry Shandling, American comedian, actor, and screenwriter (died 2016)
- 1949 – Steve Smith, American lawyer and politician (died 2014)
- 1950 – Marie Laberge, Canadian actress, educator and writer
- 1950 – Kevin O'Donnell Jr., American author (died 2012)
- 1951 – Barry Goudreau, American guitarist and songwriter
- 1951 – Roger Troutman, American singer-songwriter and producer (died 1999)
- 1952 – John D. Barrow, English cosmologist, theoretical physicist, and mathematician (died 2020)
- 1952 – Jeff Fahey, American actor and producer
- 1953 – Alex Grey, American visual artist and author
- 1953 – Vlado Kreslin, Slovenian singer-songwriter
- 1953 – Christine Pascal, French actress, writer and director (died 1996)
- 1954 – Joel Coen, American director, producer, and screenwriter
- 1954 – Chirlane McCray, American writer, editor, and activist
- 1955 – Howie Mandel, Canadian comedian, actor, and television host
- 1955 – Hassan Sheikh Mohamud, Somali politician, 8th president of Somalia
- 1956 – Hinton Battle, German-American actor, dancer, and choreographer (died 2024)
- 1956 – Yvonne Fovargue, English lawyer and politician
- 1957 – Janet Napolitano, American politician, lawyer, and university administrator
- 1957 – Jean-Philippe Toussaint, Belgian novelist, photographer and filmmaker
- 1958 – Michael Dempsey, Zimbabwean-English bass player
- 1958 – John Dramani Mahama, Ghanaian historian and politician, 4th President of Ghana
- 1959 – Richard Borcherds, South African-English mathematician and academic
- 1959 – Neal Broten, American ice hockey player
- 1959 – Rahm Emanuel, American businessman and politician, 55th Mayor of Chicago
- 1960 – Marco Bucci, Italian discus thrower (died 2013)
- 1960 – Cathy Moriarty, American actress
- 1961 – Kim Delaney, American actress
- 1961 – Tom Sizemore, American actor (died 2023)
- 1962 – Ronny Jordan, English singer-songwriter and guitarist (died 2014)
- 1962 – Andrew McCarthy, American actor and director
- 1963 – Will Downing, American singer-songwriter and producer
- 1963 – Lalit Modi, Indian businessman
- 1964 – Don Cheadle, American actor and producer
- 1964 – Ken Monkou, Dutch footballer
- 1965 – Lauren Child, English author
- 1965 – Ellen Cleghorne, American comedian and actress
- 1966 – John Layfield, American wrestler, football player, and news commentator
- 1966 – Dru Pagliassotti, American author
- 1966 – Sophia Rosenfeld, American author
- 1967 – Fernando Ramos da Silva, Brazilian actor (died 1987)
- 1967 – Charles Smith, American basketball player
- 1967 – Rebecca Wolff, American author and poet
- 1968 – Dee Brown, American basketball player and executive
- 1968 – Jonathan Knight, American singer
- 1968 – Andy Melville, Welsh footballer
- 1968 – Iolanda Nanni, Italian politician (died 2018)
- 1969 – Tomas Brolin, Swedish footballer
- 1969 – Mariano Rivera, Panamanian-American baseball player
- 1970 – Larry Joe Campbell, American actor and director
- 1970 – Mark Pembridge, Welsh footballer and coach
- 1971 – David E. Campbell, Canadian political scientist
- 1971 – Steve May, American soldier and politician
- 1971 – Gena Lee Nolin, American actress and model
- 1972 – Brian Baumgartner, American actor and producer
- 1972 – Jamal Mashburn, American basketball player and sportscaster
- 1973 – Ryan Giggs, Welsh footballer and manager
- 1973 – Fredrik Norrena, Finnish ice hockey player
- 1974 – Pavol Demitra, Slovak ice hockey player (died 2011)
- 1974 – Sarah Jones, American actress and playwright
- 1974 – Jedediah Purdy, American legal scholar and cultural commentator
- 1975 – Craig Ireland, Scottish footballer
- 1975 – Scott McCulloch, Scottish footballer
- 1976 – Chadwick Boseman, American actor and playwright (died 2020)
- 1976 – Anna Faris, American actress
- 1977 – Andy Beshear, American attorney and politician, 63rd Governor of Kentucky
- 1977 – Maria Petrova, Russian figure skater
- 1978 – Lauren German, American actress
- 1978 – Dimitrios Konstantopoulos, Greek footballer
- 1979 – Adam Barrett, English footballer
- 1979 – The Game, American rapper
- 1980 – Janina Gavankar, American actress and singer
- 1980 – Dean Howell, English footballer
- 1981 – Fawad Khan, Pakistani actor, model and singer
- 1981 – Jon Klassen, Canadian writer and illustrator
- 1982 – Lucas Black, American actor
- 1982 – Gemma Chan, English actress
- 1983 – Franchesca Ramsey, American comedian
- 1983 – Aylin Tezel, German actress
- 1983 – Tanisha Wright, American basketball player and coach
- 1984 – Ji Hyun-woo, South Korean actor and musician
- 1985 – Shannon Brown, American basketball player
- 1985 – Dominic Roma, English footballer
- 1986 – Asa Hall, English footballer
- 1987 – Wayne Ellington, American basketball player and coach
- 1988 – Abby Bishop, Australian basketball player
- 1988 – Dana Brooke, American wrestler and bodybuilder
- 1988 – Damon Harrison, American football player
- 1988 – Bradley Hudson-Odoi, Ghanaian footballer
- 1988 – Russell Wilson, American football player
- 1989 – Adam Chapman, Northern Irish footballer
- 1990 – Diego Boneta, Mexican actor and singer
- 1990 – Sheldon Richardson, American football player
- 1990 – Andrej Šustr, Czech ice hockey player
- 1990 – Yacouba Sylla, French footballer
- 1991 – Becky James, Welsh cyclist
- 1992 – Ben Nugent, English footballer
- 1993 – Stefon Diggs, American football player
- 1994 – Shaun Lane, Australian rugby league player
- 1994 – Julius Randle, American basketball player
- 1995 – Laura Marano, American actress and singer
- 1995 – Siobhan-Marie O'Connor, English swimmer
- 1997 – Nick Richards, Jamaican basketball player
- 1998 – MJ Melendez, American baseball player
- 1998 – Ye Qiuyu, Chinese tennis player
- 1998 – Lovie Simone, American actress
- 2002 – Yunus Musah, American soccer player
- 2009 – Salish Matter, American YouTuber

== Deaths ==
=== Pre-1600 ===
- 521 – Jacob of Serugh, Syrian poet and theologian (born 451)
- 524 – Ahkal Moʼ Nahb I, ruler of Palenque (born 465)
- 561 – Chlothar I, Frankish king (born 497)
- 835 – Muhammad al-Jawad, the ninth of the Twelve Imams (born 811)
- 1253 – Otto II, duke of Bavaria (born 1206)
- 1268 – Clement IV, pope of the Catholic Church (born 1190)
- 1314 – Philip IV, king of France (born 1268)
- 1330 – Roger Mortimer, 1st Earl of March, English soldier and politician, Lord Lieutenant of Ireland (born 1287)
- 1342 – Michael of Cesena, Italian general, priest, and theologian (born 1270)
- 1378 – Charles IV, Holy Roman Emperor (born 1316)
- 1530 – Thomas Wolsey, English cardinal and politician, Lord Chancellor of the United Kingdom (born 1473)
- 1577 – Cuthbert Mayne, English priest (born 1543)
- 1590 – Philipp Nicodemus Frischlin, German philologist and poet (born 1547)
- 1594 – Alonso de Ercilla, Spanish soldier and poet (born 1533)

=== 1601–1900 ===
- 1626 – Ernst von Mansfeld, German commander (born 1580)
- 1628 – John Felton, English soldier and assassin of the Duke of Buckingham (born c. 1595)
- 1632 – Frederick V, Elector Palatine (born 1596)
- 1643 – William Cartwright, English priest and playwright (born 1611)
- 1643 – Claudio Monteverdi, Italian priest and composer (born 1567)
- 1646 – Laurentius Paulinus Gothus, Swedish astronomer and theologian (born 1565)
- 1661 – Brian Walton, English bishop and scholar (born 1600)
- 1695 – James Dalrymple, 1st Viscount of Stair, Scottish lawyer and politician, Lord President of the Court of Session (born 1619)
- 1699 – Patrick Gordon, Scottish-Russian general (born 1635)
- 1759 – Nicolaus I Bernoulli, Swiss mathematician and theorist (born 1687)
- 1780 – Maria Theresa, Holy Roman Empress, wife of Francis I, Holy Roman Emperor (born 1717)
- 1797 – Samuel Langdon, American pastor, theologian, and academic (born 1723)
- 1830 – Charles-Simon Catel, French composer and educator (born 1773)
- 1846 – Hammamizade İsmail Dede Efendi, Turkish composer and educator (born 1778)
- 1847 – Marcus Whitman, American physician and missionary (born 1802)
- 1872 – Mary Somerville, Scottish-Italian astronomer, mathematician, and author (born 1780)
- 1894 – Juan N. Méndez, Mexican general and interim president, 1876–1877 (born 1820)

=== 1901–present ===
- 1901 – Francesc Pi i Margall, Spanish federalist and republican politician and theorist (born 1824)
- 1918 – Prince Antônio Gastão of Orléans-Braganza, Brazilian prince (born 1881)
- 1924 – Giacomo Puccini, Italian composer and educator (born 1858)
- 1927 – George Giffen, Australian cricketer (born 1859)
- 1932 – Abdullah Cevdet, Kurdish-Turkish physician and academic (born 1869)
- 1939 – Philipp Scheidemann, German lawyer and politician, 10th Chancellor of Germany (born 1865)
- 1941 – Frank Waller, American sprinter and hurdler (born 1884)
- 1942 – Boyd Wagner, American colonel and pilot (born 1916)
- 1942 – Ron Middleton (VC), Australian bomber pilot and Victoria Cross Recipient (born 1916)
- 1950 – Walter Beech, American aviator and early aviation entrepreneur (born 1891)
- 1953 – Sam De Grasse, Canadian-American actor (born 1875)
- 1954 – Dink Johnson, American pianist, clarinet player, and drummer (born 1892)
- 1957 – Erich Wolfgang Korngold, Czech-American pianist and composer (born 1897)
- 1967 – Ferenc Münnich, Hungarian soldier and politician, 47th Prime Minister of Hungary (born 1886)
- 1970 – Robert T. Frederick, American general (born 1907)
- 1972 – Carl Stalling, American pianist and composer (born 1888)
- 1974 – Peng Dehuai, Chinese Communist military leader (born 1898)
- 1975 – Graham Hill plane crash
  - Tony Brise, English race car driver (born 1952)
  - Graham Hill, English race car driver and businessman (born 1929)
- 1980 – Dorothy Day, American journalist and activist, co-founded the Catholic Worker Movement (born 1897)
- 1981 – Natalie Wood, American actress (born 1938)
- 1982 – Percy Williams, Canadian sprinter (born 1908)
- 1984 – Nora Thompson Dean, American Lenape educator and author (born 1907)
- 1986 – Cary Grant, English-American actor (born 1904)
- 1987 – Irene Handl, English actress (born 1901)
- 1991 – Ralph Bellamy, American actor (born 1904)
- 1991 – Joe Bonson, English footballer (born 1936)
- 1992 – Jean Dieudonné, French mathematician and academic (born 1906)
- 1993 – J. R. D. Tata, French-Indian pilot and businessman, founded Tata Motors and Tata Global Beverages (born 1904)
- 1996 – Dan Flavin, American sculptor and illustrator (born 1933)
- 1996 – Denis Jenkinson, English journalist and author (born 1920)
- 1997 – Coleman Young, American politician, 66th Mayor of Detroit (born 1918)
- 1998 – George Van Eps, American swing and mainstream jazz guitarist (born 1913)
- 1998 – Robin Ray, English broadcaster, actor, and musician (born 1934)
- 1999 – Germán Arciniegas, Colombian historian, author and journalist (born 1900)
- 1999 – John Berry, American-French actor, director, and screenwriter (born 1917)
- 1999 – Gene Rayburn, American game show panelist and host (born 1917)
- 1999 – Kazuo Sakamaki, Japanese soldier (born 1918)
- 2000 – Ilmar Laaban, Estonian-Swedish poet and publicist (born 1921)
- 2001 – Mic Christopher, American-Irish singer-songwriter and guitarist (born 1969)
- 2001 – George Harrison, English singer-songwriter, guitarist, and music producer (born 1943)
- 2001 – John Knowles, American novelist (born 1926)
- 2002 – Daniel Gélin, French actor, director, and screenwriter (born 1921)
- 2003 – Rudi Martinus van Dijk, Dutch composer (born 1932)
- 2004 – John Drew Barrymore, American actor (born 1932)
- 2004 – Harry Danning, American baseball player and coach (born 1911)
- 2004 – Jack Shields, Canadian member of Parliament (born 1929)
- 2005 – David Di Tommaso, French footballer (born 1979)
- 2006 – Allen Carr, English-Spanish accountant and author (born 1934)
- 2006 – Ernie Tagg, English footballer (born 1917)
- 2007 – James Barber, Canadian chef and author (born 1923)
- 2007 – Ralph Beard, American basketball player (born 1927)
- 2007 – Henry Hyde, American lawyer and politician (born 1924)
- 2008 – Jørn Utzon, Danish architect, designed the Sydney Opera House (born 1918)
- 2009 – Robert Holdstock, English author (born 1948)
- 2009 – Zuhair Al-Karmi, Palestinian author, scientific programs presenter on TV (born 1922).
- 2009 – Tamara Lisitsian, Soviet film director and screenwriter (born 1923)
- 2010 – Bella Akhmadulina, Russian poet and author (born 1937)
- 2010 – Mario Monicelli, Italian director and screenwriter (born 1915)
- 2010 – S. Sivanayagam, Sri Lankan journalist and author (born 1930)
- 2010 – Stephen J. Solarz, American academic and politician (born 1940)
- 2010 – Maurice Wilkes, English physicist and computer scientist (born 1913)
- 2011 – Patrice O'Neal, American stand-up comedian (born 1969)
- 2011 – Guillermo O'Donnell, Argentine political scientist (born 1936)
- 2012 – Joelmir Beting, Brazilian journalist (born 1936)
- 2012 – Sherab Palden Beru, Tibetan painter (born 1911)
- 2013 – Oliver Cheatham, American singer-songwriter (born 1948)
- 2013 – Colin Eglin, South African soldier and politician (born 1925)
- 2013 – Natalya Gorbanevskaya, Russian-Polish poet and activist (born 1936)
- 2013 – Brian Torrey Scott, American playwright and screenwriter (born 1976)
- 2014 – Dwayne Alons, American general and politician (born 1946)
- 2014 – Dick Bresciani, American businessman (born 1938)
- 2014 – Mark Strand, Canadian-born American poet, essayist, and translator (born 1934)
- 2015 – Joseph F. Girzone, American Catholic priest and author (born 1930)
- 2015 – Joe Marston, Australian footballer and manager (born 1926)
- 2015 – Christopher Middleton, British poet and translator (born 1926)
- 2015 – O'tkir Sultonov, Uzbek lawyer and politician, 2nd Prime Minister of Uzbekistan (born 1939)
- 2016 – Luis Alberto Monge, Costa Rican politician, 39th President of Costa Rica (born 1925)
- 2016 – Ruta Šaca-Marjaša, Latvian lawyer, writer and politician (born 1927)
- 2017 – Slobodan Praljak, Croatian general (born 1945)
- 2019 – Yasuhiro Nakasone, Japanese politician, 45th Prime Minister of Japan (born 1918)
- 2020 – Papa Bouba Diop, Senegalese footballer (born 1978)
- 2021 – Kinza Clodumar, Nauruan politician, 7th President of Nauru (born 1945)
- 2021 – Arlene Dahl, American actress, businesswoman and writer (born 1925)
- 2021 – LaMarr Hoyt, Major League Baseball player, 1983 AL Cy Young Award winner (born 1955)
- 2022 – Derek Granger, British film and television producer and screenwriter (born 1921)
- 2022 – Tapunuu Niko Lee Hang, Samoan politician (born 1953/1954)
- 2023 – Henry Kissinger, former US secretary of state (born 1923)
- 2023 – Taichi Yamada, Japanese screenwriter and novelist (born 1934)
- 2024 – Marshall Brickman, Brazilian-American director, producer, and screenwriter (born 1939)
- 2024 – Will Cullen Hart, American musician (born 1971)
- 2024 – Wayne Northrop, American actor (born 1947)

== Holidays and observances ==
- Christian feast day:
  - Brendan of Birr
  - Francis Fasani
  - Illuminata
  - Radboud of Utrecht
  - Saturnin
  - November 29 (Eastern Orthodox liturgics)
- International Day of Solidarity with the Palestinian People (United Nations)
- Liberation Day or Dita e Çlirimit (Albania)
- Republic Day (Yugoslavia)
- Unity Day (Vanuatu)
- William Tubman's Birthday (Liberia)
