= Grace Watamaleo =

Surinamese politician

Member of the National Assembly
- In office 2015–2020
- Constituency: Marowijne District

Captain of Marijkedorp
- Incumbent
- Assumed office 2011

Personal details
- Born: Grace Betty Watamaleo
- Party: NDP

Grace Betty Watamaleo is a Surinamese politician who has served as Captain of the indigenous village Marijkedorp since 2011. She was also a member of the National Assembly of Suriname from 2015 to 2020, representing Marowijne District for the National Democratic Party (NDP).

== Biography ==
Watamaleo is a descendant of the indigenous Lokono people. She has been the Captain (village head) of Marijkedorp near Albina in eastern Suriname since 2011. She was also a civil servant for the Marowijne District Commission.

During the 2015 general elections, Watamaleo ran as a candidate of the NDP in Marowijne District. She garnered 1991 votes, winning a seat in the National Assembly (DNA). In addition to her DNA membership, she continued to perform her role as captain of her village. She was not on the NDP's list of candidates for the 2020 general elections. Claudie Sabajo was nominated as the new Lead Candidate for Marowijne.
