= Bigiston =

- Village
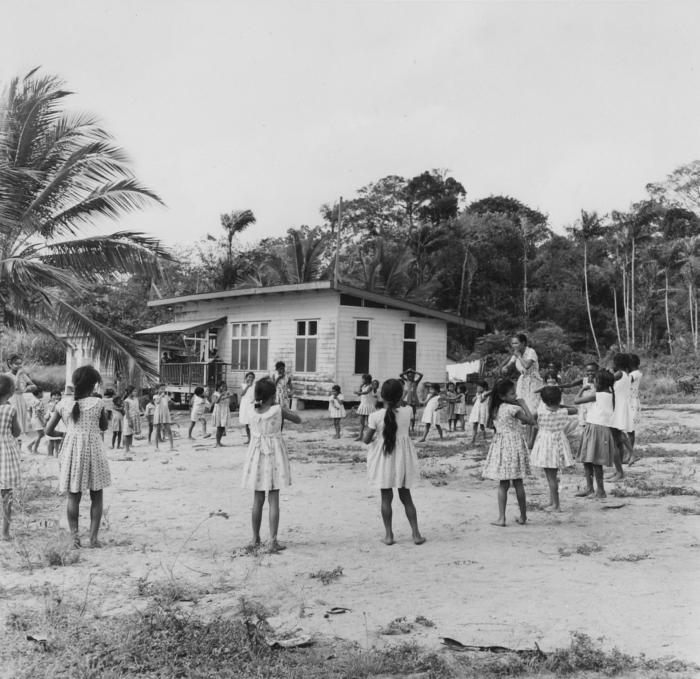
- School in Bigiston (1964)

- Location in Suriname
- Coordinates: 5.415°N 54.126389°W
- Country: Suriname
- District: Marowijne District
- Resort: Albina

Government
  - Captain: Sylvester Awatjale

Population (2020)
  - Total: 361

Bigiston, also Bigi Ston, is a group of settlements of Ndyuka Maroons and Indigenous Kalina in the Albina resort of the Marowijne District of Suriname. The villages lie on Marowijne River across from Saint-Jean-du-Maroni in French Guiana.

Bigiston is the name of the most northern of six small settlements. The name means big stone after a nearby rock with petroglyphs. The village is a minor tourist attraction, and promoted for ecotourism. The village has a school, and a clinic operated by the Regional Health Service (RGD).

The village chief as of 2017 is Sylvester Awatjale, who lives in the southern Amerindian settlement. The Ndyuka and Kalina people peacefully coexist, but do not intermingle or intermarry. Electricity is being provided by Diesel generators operating about six hours a day. The most southern settlement Gronkiki contains a Winti clinic offering traditional health care.

On 5 October 1986, during the Surinamese Interior War, the village was attacked by the Jungle Commando and most of the villagers fled to French Guiana, however the village has been rebuilt and resettled after the war.

== Bibliography ==
- Groenedijk, Sarah (2006). Winti Practives in Bigiston (Thesis). Utrecht: University of Utrecht.
- Plan Bureau (2014). "Planning Office Suriname - Districts 2009-2013" (PDF). Planning Office Suriname (in Dutch).
