= Stolkertsijver =

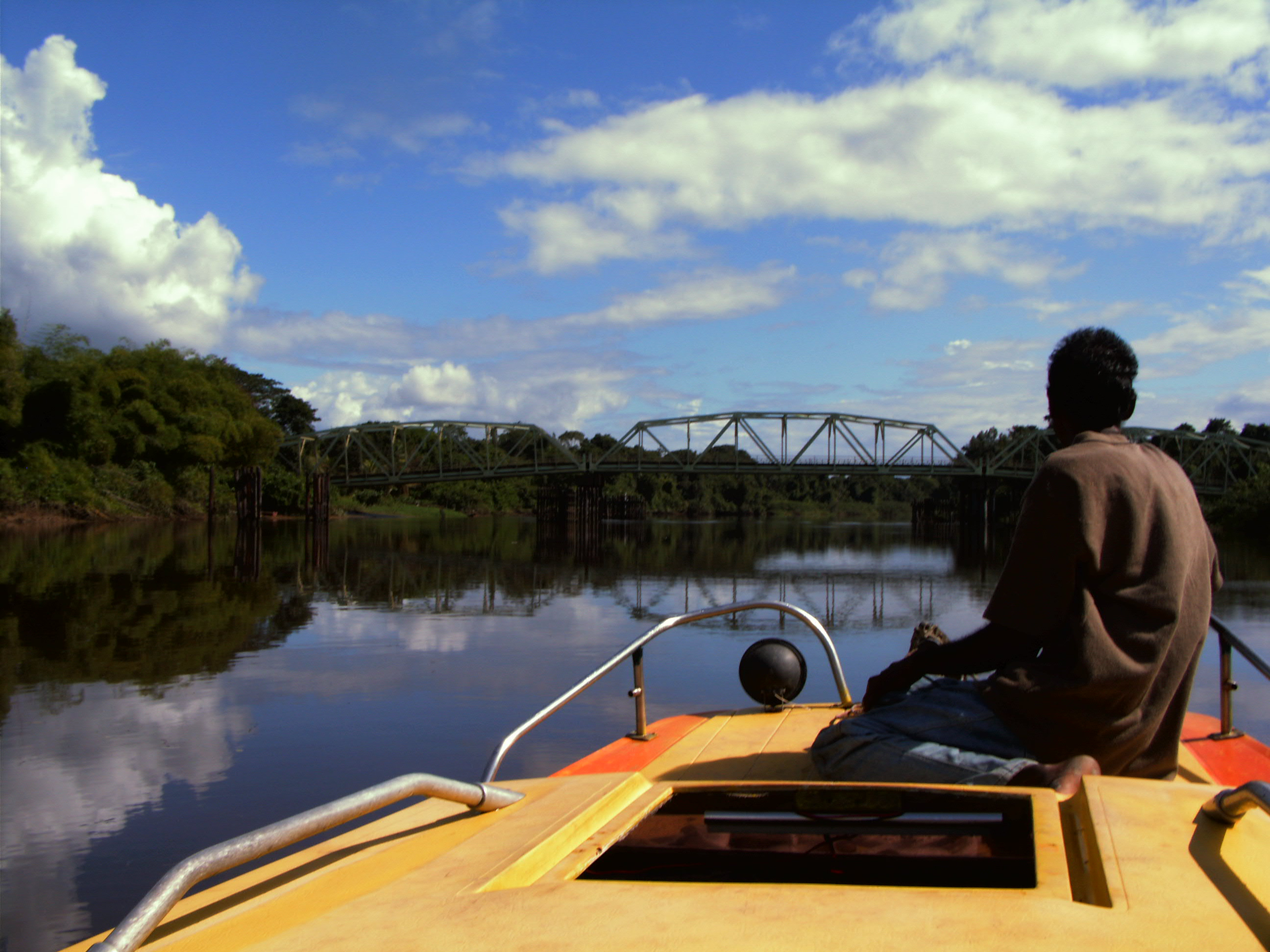
- Bridge spanning the Commewijne river at Stolkertsijver

- Location in Suriname
- Coordinates: 5°45′24″N 54°44′50″W
- Country: Suriname
- District: Commewijne District
- Resort (municipality): Tamanredjo

Stolkertsijver is a town in the Commewijne District of Suriname. It is situated on the East-West Link. At Stolkertsijver, a bridge spanning the Commewijne River was built in 1970s.

The village was named after the Stolkertsijver plantation, also known as Courcabo. The plantation was founded around 1670 by Charles Godeffroy. The plantation was abandoned in 1827.

The Surinamese Interior War started in Stolkertsijver on 22 July 1986 at around 03:00. 12 soldiers guarding the checkpoint were captured. Later it was confirmed that the soldiers had been captured by the Jungle Commando headed by Ronnie Brunswijk. The National Army responded by destroying the temple in Moengotapoe, and capturing all males present. Moengotapoe was the current home of Brunswijk. On 29 November 1986, Moiwana, the birthplace of Brunswijk, was the scene of the 1986 Moiwana massacre where 35 people, mostly women and children were killed by the National Army.
