= Moiwana massacre =

1986 massacre of Maroon villagers by Surinamese soldiers

Coordinates: 5°32′06″N 54°08′10″W

Moiwana massacre Bloedbad van Moiwana
- Part of Surinamese Interior War
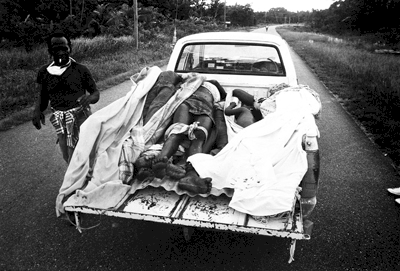
- Location: Moiwana, Marowijne, Suriname
- Date: 29 November 1986; 39 years ago
- Attack type: Massacre
- Weapons: Automatic weapons, hand grenades, machetes, dynamite
- Deaths: At least 39 people, primarily women and children
- Perpetrator: Suriname National Army

The Moiwana Massacre was a massacre perpetrated by the Suriname National Army on the Maroon village of Moiwana on 29 November 1986.

The massacre occurred during the Surinamese Interior War between the national army led by Dési Bouterse and the Jungle Commando led by Ronnie Brunswijk.

== Massacre ==
On 29 November 1986, a military unit of 70 men was sent by the government to Moiwana as it was thought to be one of Brunswijk's strongholds. The soldiers systemically massacred the residents of the village. The soldiers blocked off both ends of the village and shot every villager they encountered for over four hours. Many houses in the village were burned down.

Maroons fleeing genocide left Suriname for neighbouring French Guiana where they lived in several refugee camps set up by French authorities to handle the massive influx of refugees. The Maroons were not granted the status of refugee so that they would not be eligible to work or receive welfare benefits. They lived in these camps until the early 1990s when France and Suriname signed peace accords to repatriate the stranded Maroons back to Suriname.

== Aftermath ==
On 15 June 2005, the Inter-American Court of Human Rights held the government of Suriname responsible for the massacre and mandated they compensate survivors and victims' relatives and prosecute those responsible for the killings.

On 15 July 2006, the President of Suriname Ronald Venetiaan apologised to the Granman of the Ndyuka Gazon Matodya on behalf of the government for the massacre. 90% of 130 survivors and relatives of the victims were compensated US$130,000 each from the government.
