= Claudie Sabajo =

Surinamese politician

Member of the National Assembly
- Incumbent
- Assumed office 2020
- Constituency: Marowijne District

Personal details
- Party: NDP

Claudie Sabajo (married Doornkamp) is a Surinamese politician. She has been a member of the National Assembly of Suriname since 2020, representing Marowijne District for the National Democratic Party (NDP).

== Biography ==
Sabajo is a mother and of Lokono indigenous descent. She is a member of the women's organization of Marijkedorp. From at least 2018 to 2020, she was a board member of the Regional Health Service. In 2018, she started a business in wedding and birthday cakes, which grew out of a hobby she had since the age of 20. She is also employed by the national electricity utility Energiebedrijven Suriname.

Since at least 2012, Sabajo has been the chairperson of the National Democratic Party's Albina subdivision. In 2018, she joined the Marowijne District Council. In 2019, she was part of the ruling NDP's delegation that made a working visit to the Chinese Communist Party in Beijing. During the 2020 general elections, she was the lijsttrekker for her party in Marowijne, and won a seat in the National Assembly.
