= Tucayana Amazonas =

Suriname guerrilla group

- Leaders: Thomas Sabajo; Hugo "Piko" Sabajo
- Dates active: 1989-1992
- Headquarters: Bigi Poika
- Active regions: West Suriname
- Ideology: Amerindian self-determination
- Wars: Surinamese Interior War

The Tucayana Amazonas was an Amerindian guerrilla commando group in Suriname.

Prior to the Tucayana Amazonas, many of the fighters had been soldiers during the Surinamese Interior War who fought on the side of the National Army against the Jungle Commando. The group felt betrayed by the 1989 Treaty of Kourou, a ceasefire agreement between the Jungle Commando and the Surinamese army, which gave the Maroons more rights, but neglected indigenous rights. The Tucayana claimed to be supported by all tribes.

On 31 August 1989, a group of Amerindians took possession of the ferry near Jenny and called themselves the Tucayana Amazonas. They initially caused confusion with non-natives because they thought that Tucayana was a tribe. The Tucayana went on to take the villages of Apoera, Washabo, and Bigi Poika, where they set up their headquarters. The Tucayana Amazonas were headed by Thomas Sabajo with his brother Hugo "Piko" Sabajo as second in command in Bernharddorp, which was also liberated.

They were fighting against the Army, however the seizure of the strategic villages triggered no reaction. On 13 October the town of Moengo, a stronghold of the Jungle Commando, got attacked; 20 soldiers were killed in the fighting. Infighting occurred between the brothers, and on 31 January 1990, Thomas was deposed as leader. However, Thomas switched sides to the Army which quickly moved in to regain control over the villages. The Human Rights Watch and the Organisation of American States claim that the Tucayana had always been a proxy army of the National Army, because the Army did not want to break the terms of the Treaty of Kourou.

After the fall of the villages, Piko fled to Guyana. Eight of his supporters were killed near Matta. In early February 1990, the commanders and indigenous chiefs released a statement in support of Thomas. A week later, Piko was arrested by the police in Guyana and returned to Suriname. Piko and three of his supporters were subsequently jailed in Fort Zeelandia. On 19 February 1990, they were later taken to Apoera where they were killed.

The Tucayana Amazonas continued as a political group, and they supported the elections of 1991. On 8 August 1992, a peace treaty was signed between the National Army, the Jungle Commando and the Tucayana Amazonas. In 1992, the Vereniging van Inheemse Dorpshoofden in Suriname (Association of Indigenous Village Chiefs in Suriname) was founded to regain traditional control in the villages and to act as a political pressure group.

As of 2020, the bodies of the victims have not been discovered and the incidents have not been investigated. The activist group Dwaze Moeders van Suriname claims 12 victims, however Amnesty International considers the number of victims unknown.

== Bibliography ==
- Boven, Karin M. (2006). Overleven in een Grensgebied: Veranderingsprocessen bij de Wayana in Suriname en Frans-Guyana (PDF). Amsterdam: Rozenberg Publishers.
- Janssen, Roger (2011). In Search of a Path: An Analysis of the Foreign Policy of Suriname from 1975 to 1991. Leiden: Brill. p. 208. ISBN 978-90-04-25367-4. JSTOR 10.1163/j.ctt1w8h0wm.
