= Albina, Suriname =

Albina Alimina (Eastern Maroon Creole)
- Town
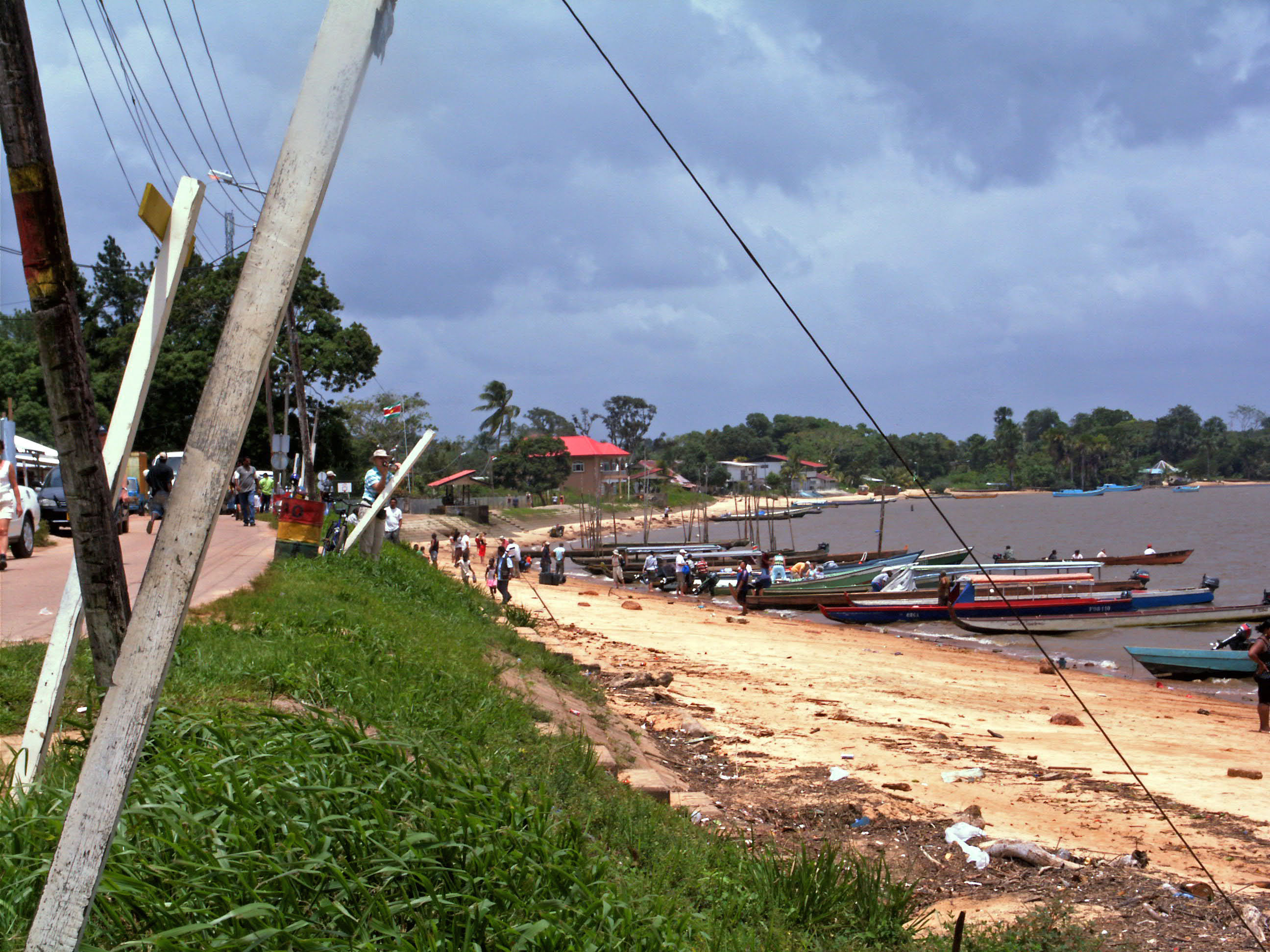
- Albina in 2008

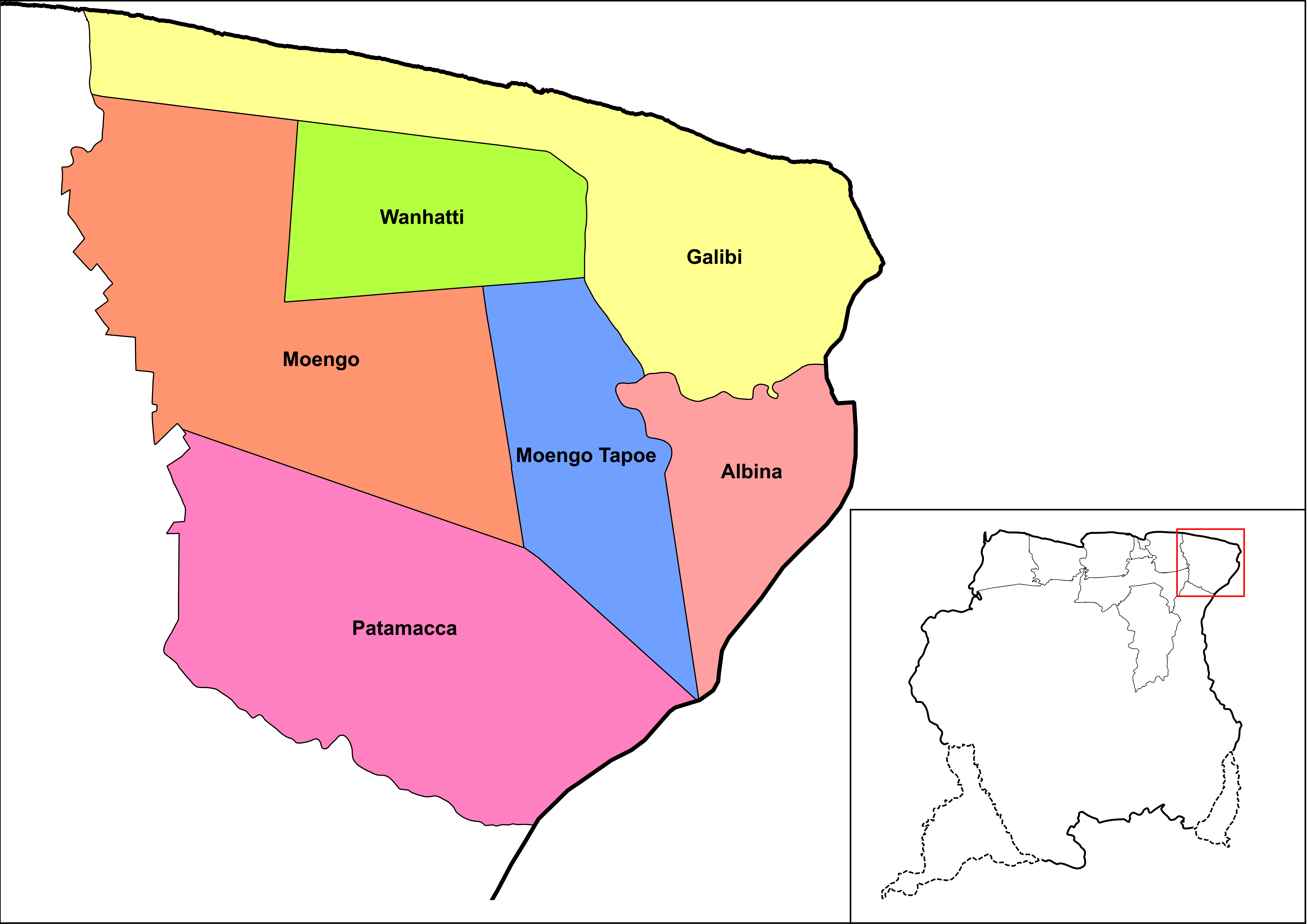
- Map showing the resorts of Marowijne District. Albina
- Coordinates: 5°30′N 54°03′W
- Country: Suriname
- District: Marowijne District
- Resort (municipality): Albina

Area
  - Total: 397 km^{2} (153 sq mi)
- Elevation: 5 m (16 ft)

Population (2012 census)
  - Total: 5,247
  - Density: 13.2/km^{2} (34.2/sq mi)

Albina (Eastern Maroon Creole: Alimina or Alibina) is a town in eastern Suriname, and is capital of the Marowijne District. The town lies on the west bank of the Marowijne River (Maroni River), which forms the border with French Guiana, directly opposite the French Guianan city of Saint-Laurent-du-Maroni, to which it is connected by a frequent ferry service. Albina can be reached by bus via the East-West Link. The distance between Paramaribo and Albina is about 150 kilometres (95 mi).

== History ==
Albina was founded on 13 December 1846 by August Kappler, and was named after his wife Albina Josefine Liezenmaier (1815-1904). Kappler had left Germany, and journeyed to Suriname. He noticed an abandoned indigenous village near the Maroni river. Later he met friendly indigenous and Maroon people nearby, and decided to settle in the village after having received permission. By 1913, there was a little town with a medical clinic, and Albina was home to 349 men and 266 women.

On 22 July 1986, the Surinamese Interior War started. That night, the Jungle Commando, led by Ronnie Brunswijk, opened fire on the army barracks in Albina. The fighting lasted three hours. One soldier and two civilians were wounded. The National Army responded by destroying the temple in Moengotapoe, and capturing all males present. During the civil war (1986–1992) which followed, great parts of the area, including much of the town of Albina, and the road, were destroyed. It also caused a refugee crisis into French Guiana. The birthplace of Ronnie Brunswijk is the village of Moiwana Moiwana was the scene of the Moiwana massacre where 35 people, mostly women and children were killed by the National Army.

On 24–25 December 2009, the Albina riots took place, when local Maroon inhabitants attacked Brazilian, Chinese, Colombian and Peruvian gold prospectors after a man was allegedly stabbed to death by a Brazilian. The riots caused one death, and at least 24 wounded.

== Transportation ==
Plans have been made to build a bridge between Suriname and French Guiana, however as of May 2020, no action has been taken.

The town has a small airport, the Albina Airstrip, with a 650-metre (2,150 ft) asphalt runway in use since 1953.

Albina has a small boat (korjaal) connection to Galibi. The journey across the water takes about 1.5 hrs. There is a beach and a small tourist shop. The main reason tourists visit Galibi is to see the turtles, which come from all over the world (including places as distant as Costa Rica and Australia) to lay their eggs in Suriname.

== Notable people ==
- Ronnie Brunswijk (1961), Vice President of Suriname, ex-rebel leader and business man.
- Henk Chin A Sen (1934-1999), former President of Suriname.
- Olton van Genderen (1921-1990), Deputy Prime Minister.
- Oscar Harris (1943), musician.

== Villages ==
- Alfonsdorp and Marijkedorp are indigenous Lokono villages.
- Bigiston is a group of Ndyuka Maroons and indigenous Kalina villages.
- Moiwana is a Ndyuka village where the Moiwana massacre of 1986 took place.

== Sister cities ==
- Koksijde, Belgium.
