= Moengotapoe =

Coordinates: 5°34′48″N 54°14′38″W

- Resort
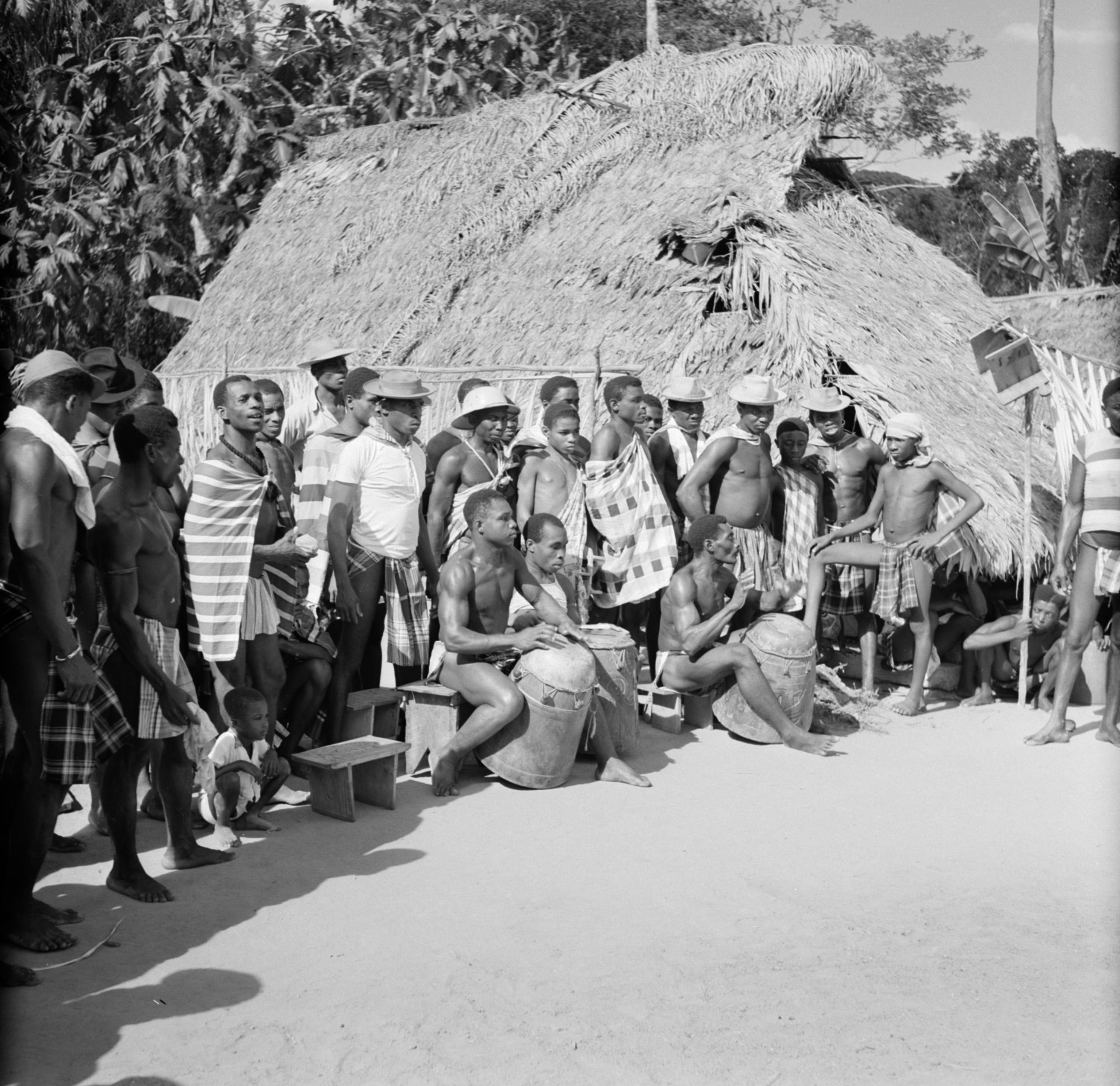
- Moengotapoe (1955)

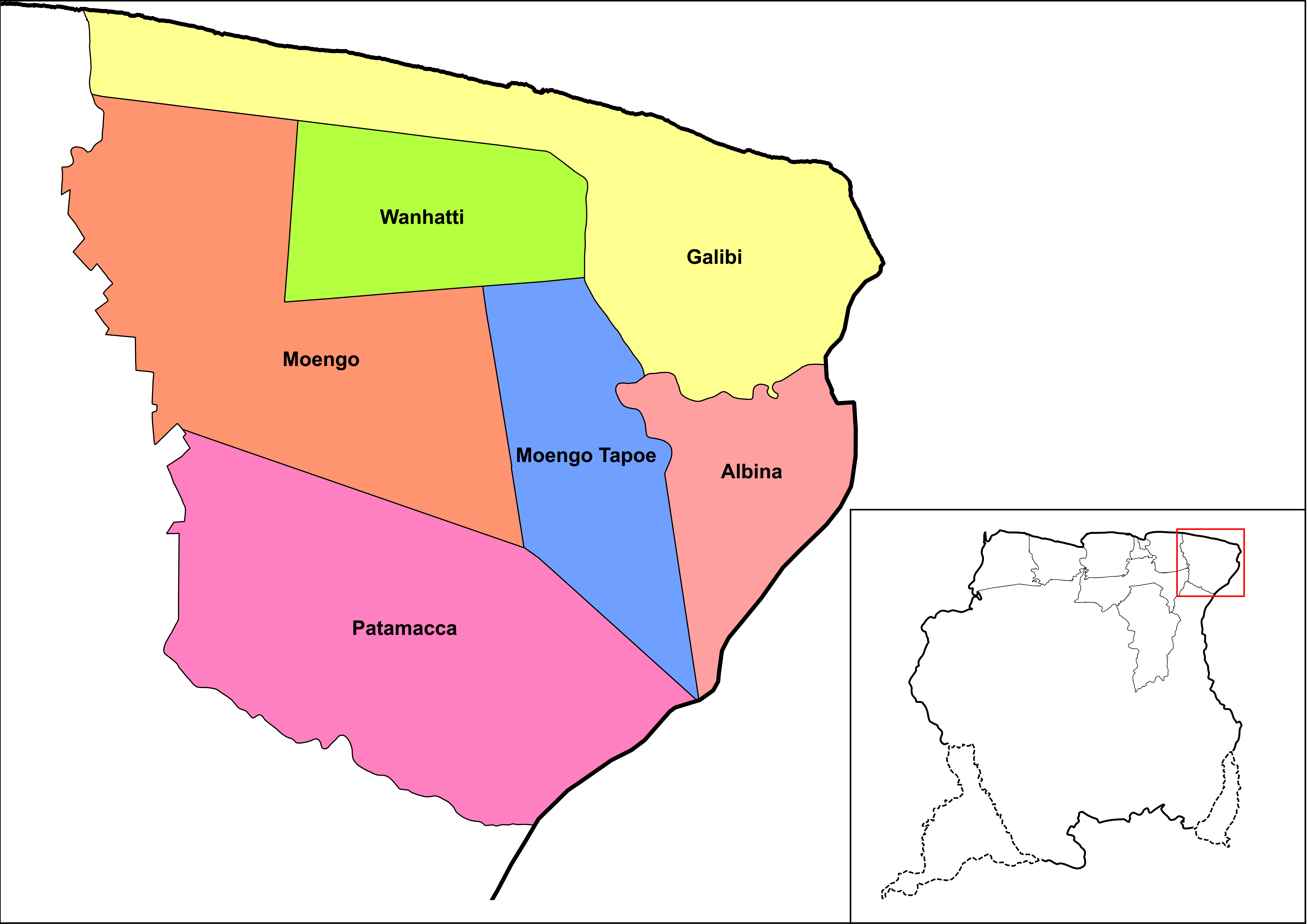
- Map showing the resorts of Marowijne District. Moengotapoe
- Country: Suriname
- District: Marowijne District

Area
  - Total: 455 km^{2} (176 sq mi)
- Elevation: 6 m (20 ft)

Population (2012)
  - Total: 579
  - Density: 1.27/km^{2} (3.30/sq mi)
- Time zone: UTC-3 (AST)

Moengotapoe is a resort in Suriname, located in the Marowijne District. Its population at the 2012 census was 579.

The village of Moengotapoe was not spared during the Surinamese Interior War, because it was the home of Brunswijk at the time. On 22 July 1986, Brunswijk captured the military post near Stolkertsijver and opened fire on the army barracks in Albina. The National Army responded by destroying the temple in Moengotapoe, and capturing all males present. The women and children fled the village.
