= Marijkedorp =

Village of Indigenous Lokono people

Marijkedorp Wan Shi Sha
- Village
- Location in Suriname
- Coordinates: 5.507083°N 54.052556°W
- Country: Suriname
- District: Marowijne District
- Resort: Albina

Government
  - Captain: Grace Watamaleo

Population (2020)
  - Total: 310

Marijkedorp (Lokono: Wan Shi Sha) is a village of Indigenous Lokono people in the Albina resort of the Marowijne District of Suriname. Grace Watamaleo has been the village captain since 2011.

In the 1970s, Albina and Marijkedorp started become a single urban area. Marijkedorp is depended on Albina for education and healthcare. The Lokono language has nearly disappeared from Marijkedorp and replaced by Dutch. In 2021, an initiative was launched to revitalise the language.

== Nature reserve ==
Marijkedorp and the village of Alfonsdorp are in an ongoing dispute over the Wanekreek Nature Reserve, as both consider it part of their traditional hunting and fishing grounds. The reserve has not been inhabited since the 1950s.

== Bibliography ==
- Ouboter, Paul E. (2001). "Directory of protected areas of Suriname". IBER.
- Plan Bureau (2014). "Planning Office Suriname - Districts 2009-2013" (PDF). Planning Office Suriname (in Dutch).
