= Surinamese Civil War =

Civil war in Suriname (1986–1992)

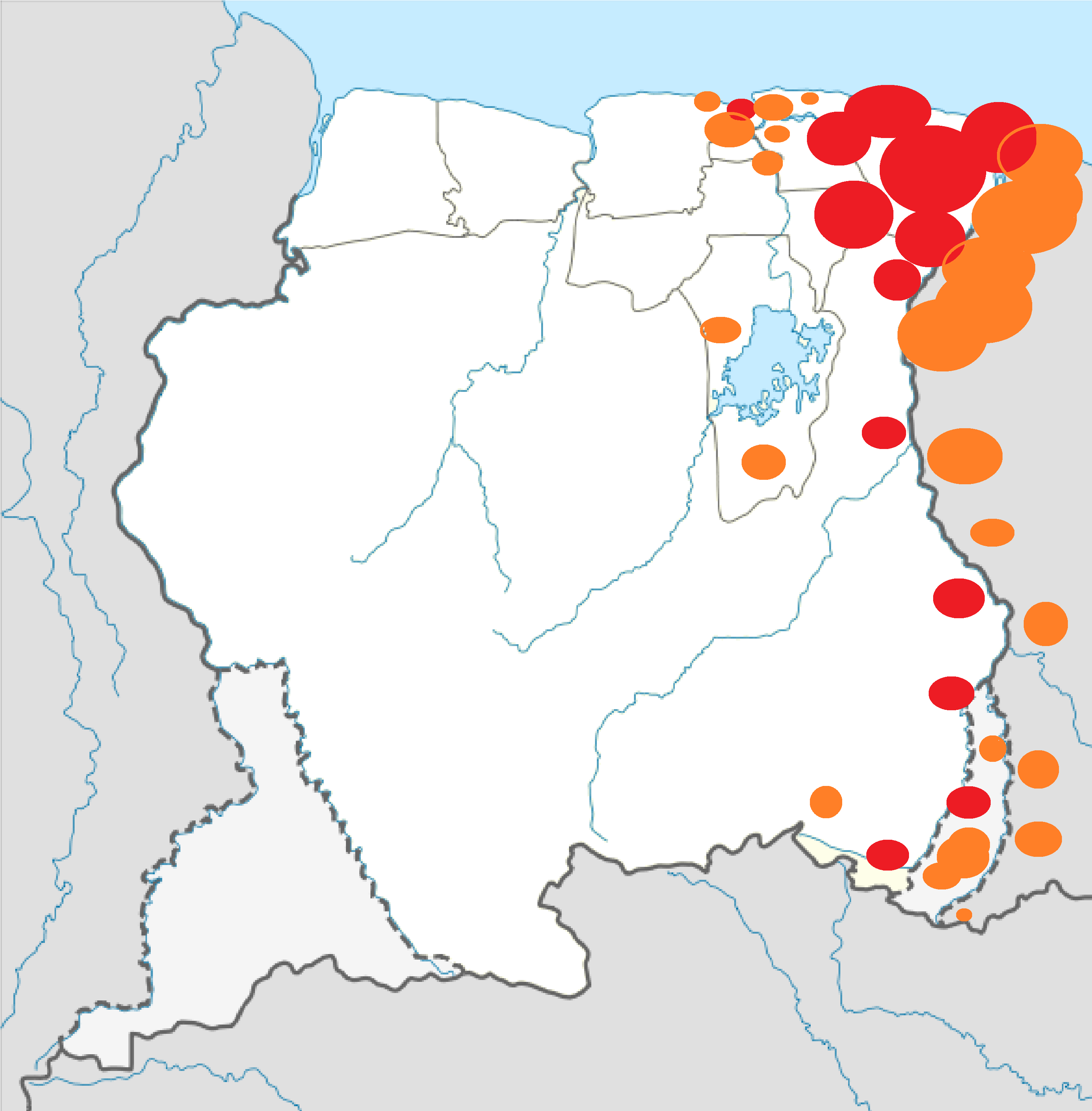
Areas affected by the Jungle Commando conflict
Refugee-affected areas due to conflict
Date	22 July 1986 – 8 August 1992 (6 years, 2 weeks and 3 days)
Location	Eastern Suriname
Result	Ceasefire and peace agreement following democratic restoration

Belligerents
(Suriname) Surinamese National Army	Jungle Commando; Tucayana Amazonas

Commanders and leaders
(Suriname) Dési Bouterse (de facto head of state) (Suriname) Fred Ramdat Misier (Suriname) Ramsewak Shankar (Suriname) Johan Kraag (Suriname) Ronald Venetiaan	Ronnie Brunswijk (Jungle Commando); Thomas Sabajo (Tucayana Amazonas)

Casualties and losses
	60 Jungle Commando fighters (estimated)
- At least 300 civilians killed

The Surinamese Civil War, also known as Surinamese Interior War (Dutch: Binnenlandse Oorlog), was a civil war fought in eastern Suriname between 1986 and 1992. The conflict primarily involved the Jungle Commando, a rebel group composed largely of Saramaka (Maroon) fighters and led by former soldier Ronnie Brunswijk, and the Surinamese National Army, commanded by then-army chief and de facto head of state Dési Bouterse.

== Background ==
Suriname has one of the most ethnically diverse populations in South America. Its people include those of South Asian (Indian), Javanese, Chinese, European, Indigenous (Amerindian), African (Creole and Maroon), and multiracial descent. The ancestors of the Maroons were enslaved Africans who escaped from coastal plantations between the mid-17th and late 18th centuries and established autonomous communities in the interior. These groups successfully resisted Dutch colonial forces and secured their independence through peace treaties signed with the Dutch in the 1760s. The Dutch, unable to subdue them militarily, recognized Maroon autonomy in exchange for peace and a cessation of attacks on plantations.

Suriname gained full independence from the Netherlands on 25 November 1975. In the years following independence, Dési Bouterse, a non-commissioned officer in the newly formed Surinamese National Army, became a central figure in the country’s political trajectory. On 25 February 1980, Bouterse and fifteen other army sergeants staged a military coup that overthrew the civilian government. Initially claiming to restore order and combat corruption, Bouterse eventually consolidated power and ruled as the country’s de facto leader throughout the 1980s.

In 1987, under internal and international pressure, Bouterse oversaw the drafting of a new constitution, which reintroduced civilian governance and multiparty elections. However, the military retained significant influence, and Bouterse continued as commander of the army, maintaining substantial power behind the scenes even after the installation of an elected government.

== Conflict ==
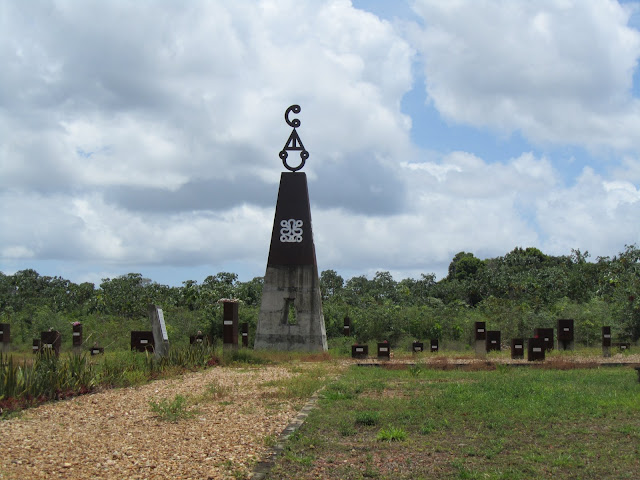
Monument in Albina, Suriname to the victims of the Moiwana massacre during the Surinamese civil war

The Surinamese Interior War began as a personal feud between Dési Bouterse and Ronnie Brunswijk, a Maroon who had formerly served as Bouterse’s bodyguard. Over time, the conflict evolved into a broader political and ethnic struggle. Brunswijk demanded democratic reforms, civil rights, and economic development for the country’s marginalized Maroon population.

The armed conflict officially began on 22 July 1986 in the town of Stolkertsijver, when twelve soldiers stationed at a checkpoint were captured in a pre-dawn raid. That same night, a coordinated attack was carried out on the Surinamese Army barracks in Albina, resulting in a three-hour gunfight that left one soldier and two civilians injured. Responsibility for both attacks was later claimed by the Jungle Commando, an armed rebel group led by Brunswijk.

In retaliation, the National Army destroyed a temple in Moengotapoe—Brunswijk’s home village—and detained all males present at the scene.

In November 1986, military forces launched an attack on Moiwana, another village associated with Brunswijk. The assault resulted in the deaths of 35 civilians, most of them women and children. The village was largely destroyed, including the burning of Brunswijk’s residence. Over 100 survivors fled to neighboring French Guiana.

On 1 June 1989, Jungle Commando forces seized the strategically important Afobaka Dam, which supplies electricity to much of the country. They threatened to flood the capital, Paramaribo, unless the government agreed to negotiations. The rebels eventually withdrew 36 hours later on Brunswijk’s orders. Peace talks began shortly thereafter, with a preliminary meeting held on 7 June 1989 on Portal Island. A formal agreement was signed on 21 July and approved by the National Assembly on 7 August, signaling both sides' intent to end hostilities.

The ceasefire agreement included provisions for emergency aid to rebuild Maroon villages, the lifting of the state of emergency in eastern Suriname, and the repatriation of refugees. The government also proposed the transformation of Jungle Commando forces into a legitimate security unit to patrol the interior.

However, the 1989 Treaty of Kourou was met with criticism by some Indigenous groups, who felt the agreement prioritized Maroon rights while ignoring the concerns of Indigenous peoples. On 31 August 1989, the Indigenous resistance group Tucayana Amazonas took control of a ferry near Jenny, and later occupied the villages of Apoera, Washabo, and ultimately Bigi Poika, where they established their headquarters. The group was led by brothers Thomas and Hugo “Piko” Sabajo. Internal divisions emerged, and Thomas eventually allied with the Surinamese Army, which swiftly retook the area. Piko fled to Guyana, but was arrested in February 1990 and deported back to Suriname, where he and his followers were reportedly killed.

Despite the ceasefire, sporadic violations occurred. By September 1989, at least 300 people had died, numerous villages had been destroyed, and bauxite mining operations were disrupted. An estimated 7,000 Maroons had taken refuge in French Guiana.

On 19 March 1991, peace negotiations resumed in the town of Moengo. The government offered integration of Jungle Commando members into the national army and employment opportunities in forestry and gold prospecting in exchange for full disarmament. Final talks were held on 27 March 1991 in Drietabbetje, effectively ending the conflict. Nonetheless, several Jungle Commando leaders based in the Netherlands rejected the agreement and vowed to continue their struggle.

On 8 August 1992, a comprehensive peace treaty was signed by representatives of the National Army, the Jungle Commando, and the Tucayana Amazonas.

== War crimes ==
On 29 November 1986, the Surinamese military government executed more than 40 people, including women and children, and burned the village of Moiwana. Three years after the massacre, then-military leader Dési Bouterse issued a statement assuming direct responsibility for the killings. As a result of an investigation by the Inter-American Commission on Human Rights (IACHR), the Surinamese government issued a formal apology to the victims' families in 2006 and paid compensation to the survivors. However, the perpetrators of the massacre have not been brought to justice.

On 23 April 1987, the civil conflict had spread to the Sipaliwini District. The Jungle Commando, led by Ronnie Brunswijk, forced the residents of Pokigron into the jungle, robbed them, and burned their homes.

On 11 September 1987, the National Army, led by Bouterse, launched a retaliatory operation against the Jungle Commando. According to a report by Aide Médicale Internationale, civilians—including women and children—were killed in the operation. Both the army and the Jungle Commando denied any civilian casualties.

On 27 September 1989, the IACHR issued a report declaring that the events constituted serious violations of the right to life. It urged the Government of Suriname to conduct a thorough investigation and recommended compensation for the victims' families. The Commission identified 15 deaths, four disappearances, and one case with unclear circumstances. Among the deceased were six children and three women; one woman was reportedly raped before being killed.

On 31 December 1987, during a counter-insurgency operation in the Atjoni region, seven Maroon civilians were detained by the military on suspicion of links to the Jungle Commando. They were transported a few kilometers away, forced to dig their own graves, and six were summarily executed. The seventh died of injuries sustained while attempting to escape. The IACHR launched an investigation into the incident in January 1988.

On 10 September 1993, the IACHR awarded the victims’ families US$450,000 in damages and required the Surinamese state to reimburse them for costs incurred in locating the bodies. A subsequent decision found the compensation inadequate and ordered the government to reopen the village’s medical dispensary and school.

== Sources ==
- Vries, Ellen de: Suriname na de binnenlandse oorlog, Amsterdam 2005: KIT Publishers, ISBN 90-6832-499-3
- Hoogbergen, W. & D. Kruĳt: De oorlog van de sergeanten: Surinaamse militairen in de politiek, Amsterdam 2005: Bakker, ISBN 90-351-2998-9
- Boven, Karin M. (2006). Overleven in een Grensgebied: Veranderingsprocessen bij de Wayana in Suriname en Frans-Guyana (PDF). Amsterdam: Rozenberg Publishers.
