= Moiwana =

Village of Suriname

- Village
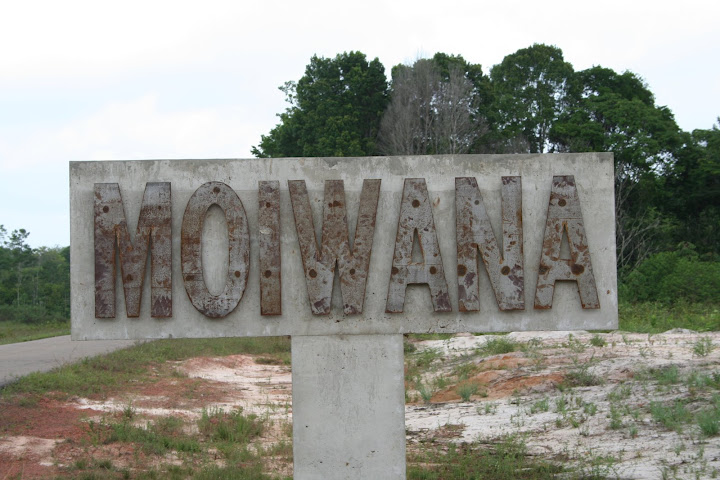

- Location within Suriname
- Coordinates: 5°32′5″N 54°8′11″W
- Country: Suriname
- District: Marowijne District
- Resort: Albina
- Time zone: UTC-3 (AST)

Moiwana is a Maroon village in the Marowijne district in the east of Suriname.

== Massacre ==
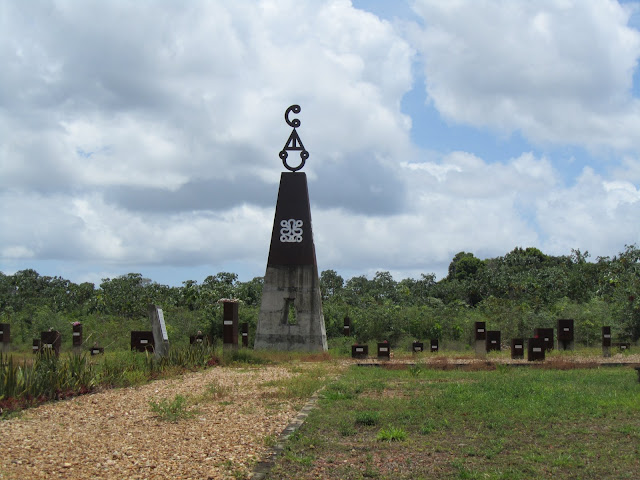
Moiwana monument to the victims of the Moiwana massacre in Albina, Suriname

The village was the scene of the Moiwana massacre on November 29, 1986, during the Suriname Guerrilla War between the Surinamese military regime, headed by Dési Bouterse, and the Jungle Commando led by Ronnie Brunswijk. The army attacked the village, killing at least 35 of the inhabitants, mostly women and children, and burned Brunswijk's house. The survivors fled with thousands of other inland inhabitants over the Marowijne River to neighbouring French Guiana.

The human rights organisation Moiwana '86 has committed itself to justice with regard to this event.

Police chief inspector Herman Gooding was murdered in August 1990 while investigating the massacre. Reportedly he was forced out of his car near Fort Zeelandia and shot in the head, with his body left outside Bouterse's office. Other police investigators fled the country, stalling the investigation.

The government has stated that it is still continuing its investigation of the massacre, but that prospective witnesses either had moved or died, or were uncooperative. It has also said that an investigation of the murder of Herman Gooding was continuing.

In August 2005, the Inter-American Court of Human Rights ordered Suriname to pay US$3 million in compensation to 130 survivors of the massacre, and to establish a US$1.2 million fund for the development of Moiwana.

== Notable people ==
- Ronnie Brunswijk (1961), Vice President of Suriname, ex-rebel leader and business man.
