= Bigi Poika =

Coordinates: 5°24′52″N 55°30′17″W

- Resort
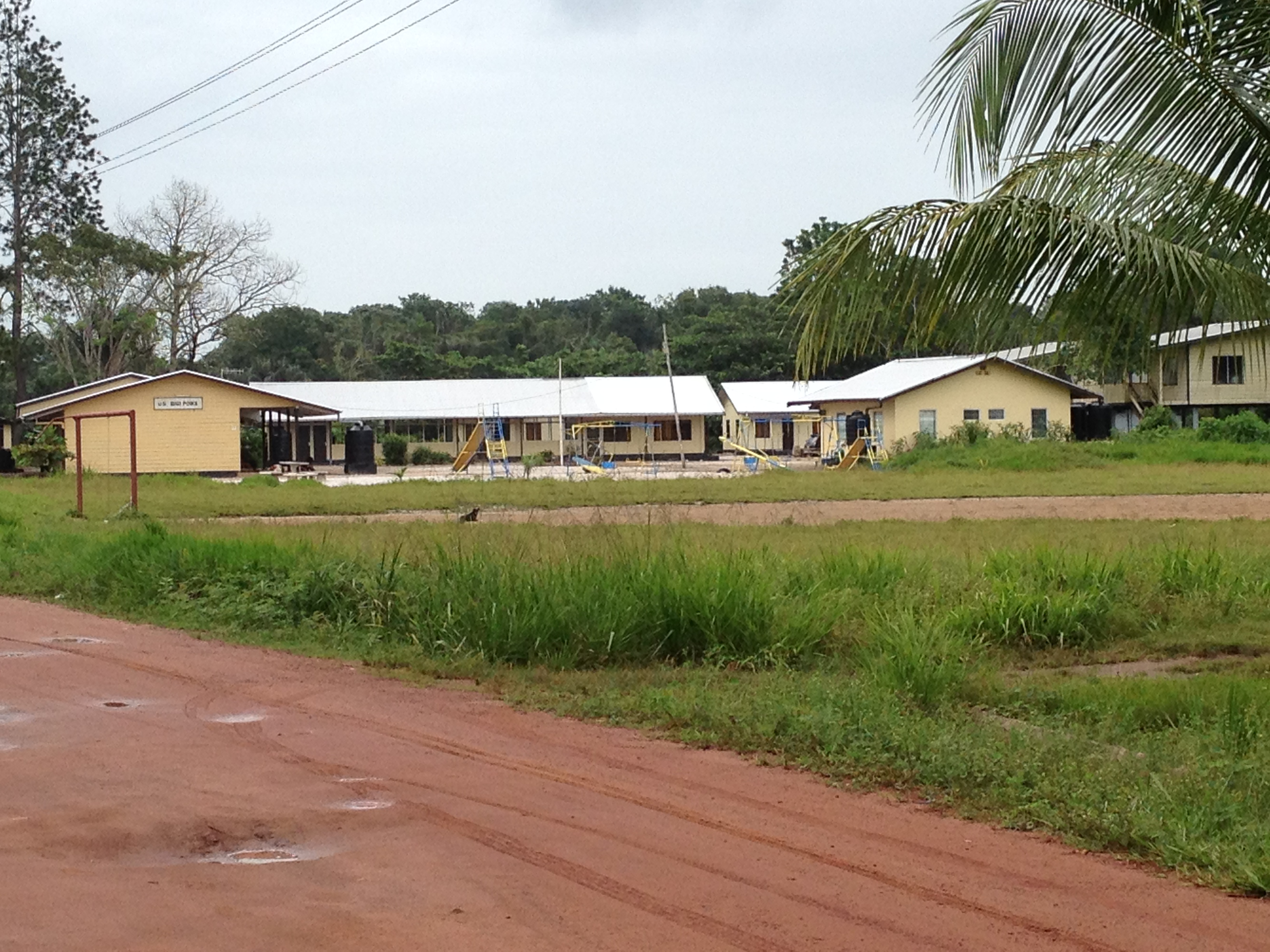
- School in Bigi Poika

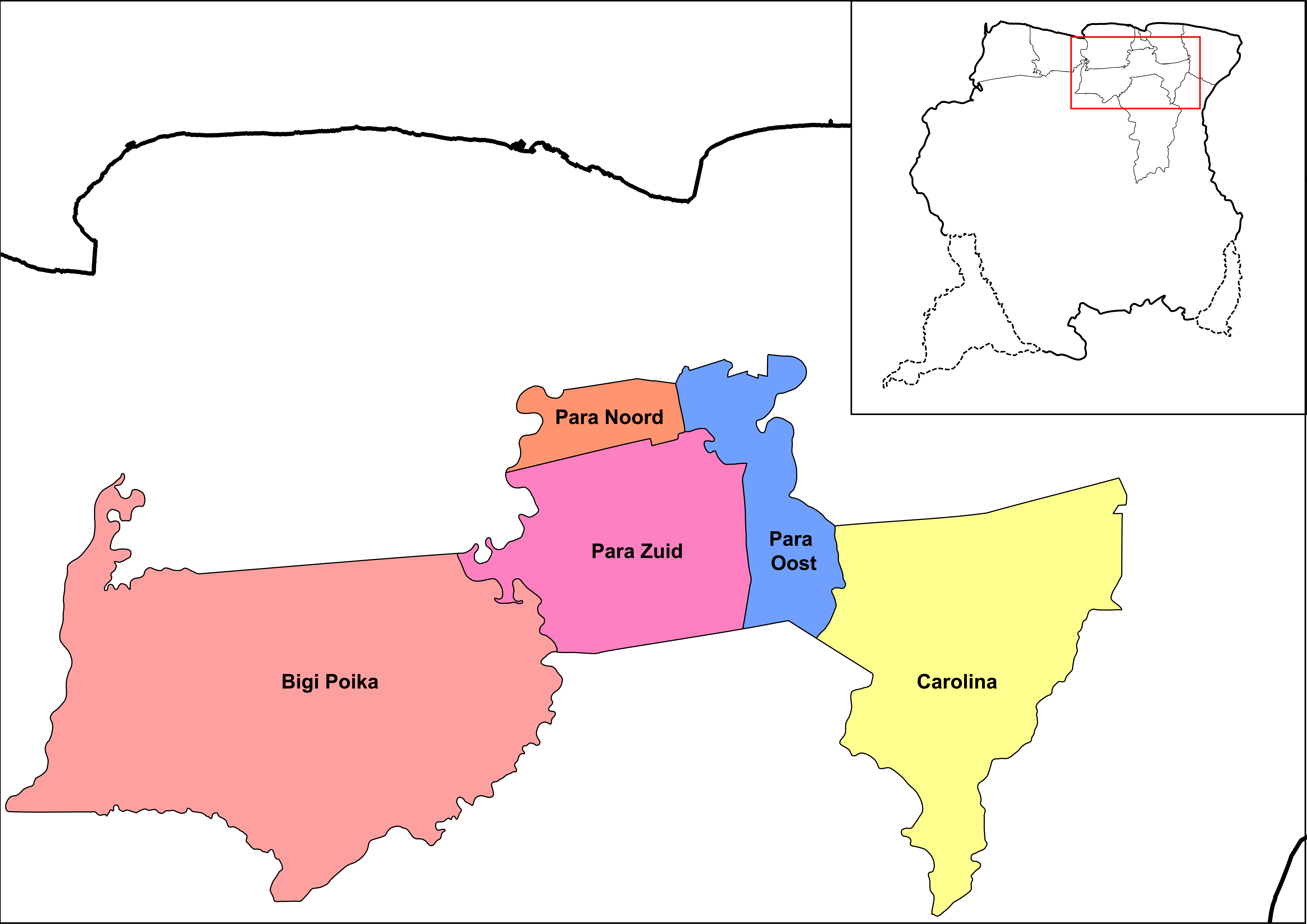
- Map showing the resorts of Para District. Bigi Poika
- Country: Suriname
- District: Para District

Government
  - Captain: Ivanildo Iejoenakame

Area
  - Total: 2,361 km^{2} (912 sq mi)
- Elevation: 30 m (98 ft)

Population (2012)
  - Total: 525
  - Density: 0.222/km^{2} (0.576/sq mi)
- Time zone: UTC-3 (AST)

Bigi Poika is a resort ( ten Districts are divided into 62 resorts) located in the Para District in northern Suriname. Its population at the 2012 census was 525. The population of the eponomymous main village was 267 people in 2022.

In 1978–9, a British social anthropologist from the London School of Economics, Lesley Forrest, did her fieldwork in Bigi Poika. She lived for over a year with the Carib (Kalinya) Indians, within the family group of the headman (Kapitein), and studied their changing economic and social organisation, with particular reference to the complexity of female production. The population at that time was approximately 300. Lesley Forrest's study, based entirely on her own observations, was the basis of a PhD thesis submitted in 1987.

In this thesis, she describes how the economy of the Coastal Caribs of Surinam, like that of many lowland South American Amerindians, was traditionally based on a root crop horticulture complemented by a maximum exploitation of wild food resources. Women were vital to the economy as primary producers of cultivated food - bitter manioc is planted and, through an arduous process, made into bread. Matri-related women formed the nucleus of the only relatively enduring social groups, recruited according to the uxorilocal/matrilocal residence rule. The solidarity of kinswomen within these residential camps, in conjunction with their economic role, afforded women a high degree of personal autonomy. Within these egalitarian societies, the concept of personal autonomy was crucial to our understanding of not only the political and economic relations between men, but the relationship between the sexes, where marriage was a partnership characterised by interdependence rather than domination.

The last chapters of the thesis discuss the ways in which traditional values and relationships were threatened by economic change: the adoption of wage labour by men increased their dependency on the national economy; and urban migration had begun to dislocate women from their traditional role and their kinswomen thereby increasing their dependency on their husbands.
