= Jungle Commando =

Guerrilla commando group in Suriname

Suriname National Liberation Army Jungle Commando
- Leader: Ronnie Brunswijk
- Dates active: 1986–1991
- Active regions: East Suriname
- Ideology: Maroon self-determination
- Wars: Surinamese Interior War

The Jungle Commando (formally known as the Suriname National Liberation Army) was a guerrilla commando group in Suriname. It was founded by Ronnie Brunswijk in 1986 to ensure equal rights for Suriname's minority Maroon population. The group was formed after the Suriname troops committed mass murder against 35 people in Moiwana Village, near Moengo, after the Suriname national army failed to capture Ronnie Brunswijk. The Commando fought against Dési Bouterse and the Surinamese army in the Suriname Guerrilla War.

The Jungle Commando fought a guerrilla war against the Surinamese government of Dési Bouterse in the 1980s, before a truce was negotiated in March 1991.

At one time the Jungle Commando controlled a large area in East Suriname.

In 2005, Brunswijk warned that the Jungle Commando could resume fighting if the 1992 Kourou peace accord's conditions were not met.

== First appearances ==
In the late 1970s and early 1980s, the Surinamese people began witnessing a dramatic fall in respect for traditional leaders and their practices, under the current government and place. In response to this was the emergence of the Suriname National Liberation Army, a militant resistance group that struggled in an attempt to disband the current military leadership of the country and constitute a democracy. Locals referred to the group as the Jungle Commando as it was formed by high-ranking officials who had previously fled the military, most notably Ronnie Brunswijk. Brunswijk was previously involved in a military coup in which the previous government was overthrown in 1980. He and a small group of deserters attacked 12 soldiers at a military outpost in Stolkertsijver on July 22, 1986. While holding this group of soldiers hostage, another attack was launched on the army barracks in Albina. The National Army responded by destroying the temple in Moengotapoe, and capturing all males present. Later Brunswijk's birth village of Moiwana was attacked which resulted in the death of at least 35 people.

These attacks served as the catalyst for the Surinamese Interior War.

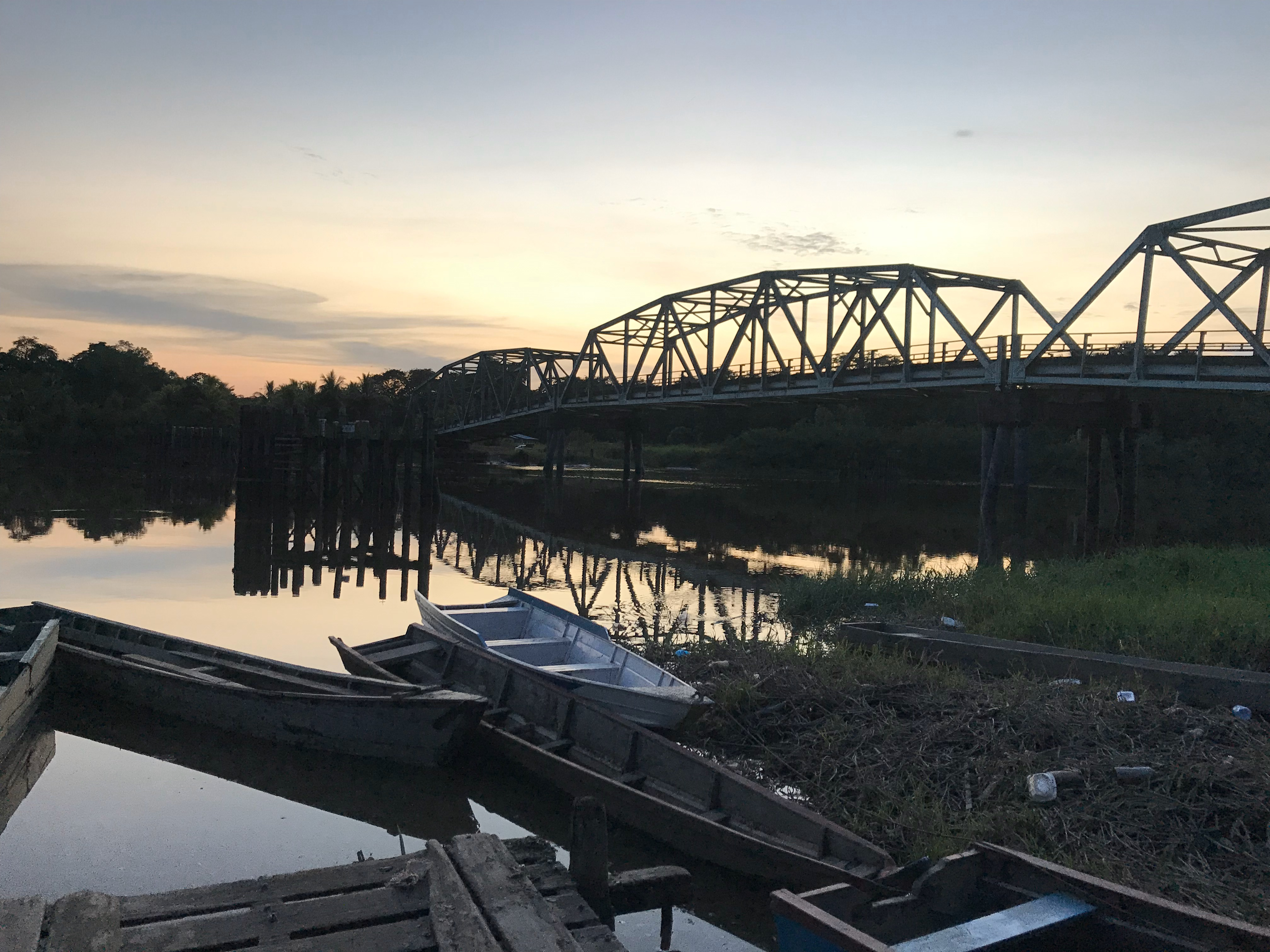
Bridge at Stolkertsijver

== Involvement in Moengo ==
The Jungle Commando would soon begin primarily acting in and around the town of Moengo. On August 20, 1986, the bauxite processing plants responsible for most of the economic prosperity in the area would be shut down by the Suriname Aluminum Company due to the Jungle Commandos' increased presence in the area. The following day, on August 21, the Jungle Commandos attacked a nearby military platoon at Ajumara Kondre. These attacks led to the jungle commandos' possessing primary control over the Marowijne, Lawa, and Tapanahoni rivers. This control over the local waterways eventually resulted in many hijackings. The first of which took place that September when the jungle commando ceased control over an engined Cessna at Apetina. Nearing the end of November 1986, the Jungle Commando would be responsible for the destruction of two bridges on the east–west highway into Moengo, leading to their inevitable takeover of the area. Soon after, on December 1, the Surinamese government would issue a state of emergency for the area, and on the following day, the Jungle Commando would be driven out of Moengo. In late December, the Jungle Commando would kidnap the son of Granman Belfon Aboikoni to signal that they were still in the area and had only moved up river toward central Suriname. In January 1987, the Jungle Commando bombed multiple power lines, causing an aluminum refinery to shut down and a citywide blackout to occur in Paramaribo because of the Afobaka dam losing power. The next month, in February, the Moengo powerhouse would be destroyed, as well as a palm oil plantation in Patamacca. This caused the village of Pokigron to request military support to help ward off the Jungle Commandos as the area was now in economic disarray. In May 1987, the Jungle Commandos continued to attack Moengo and Albina until military forces secured the area. Over the next two years, the military presence would dwindle again and the Jungle Commando would return to take over Moengo for a second time in October 1989, this time with the help of a splinter group headed by Kofi Ajomopong.

== Interactions with new government ==
In September 1987, a referendum was held in which the government approved a new draft of the Constitution, paving the way for democracy in the Republic of Suriname. On November 25, elections were held in which forty of the fifty-one seats were filled by members of the traditional party. This would lead to little change as the government continued to undermine its citizens and commit human rights violations one after the other. In their continual pursuit of the head of the Jungle Commando, the military continued capturing locals they claimed were rebels and executing them. These killings would continue until 1989, when the Jungle Commandos' prevalence in the area began to rise in retaliation. The village of Pokigron was completely burned to the ground by members of the Jungle Commando. Several businesses and homes were also targeted in the town of Brownsweg several days later. On August 31, the Jungle Commando would hijack a ferry containing over forty vehicles 54 miles west of Paramaribo on the Coppename River. The ferry was then brought up river where the Jungle Commando would use this equipment to take control of Carib and Arowak. Shortly after this series of attacks, the government would begin pursuing negotiations with the Jungle Commando in late November.

== Peace attempts ==
In June 1989, the Jungle Commando and the Surinamese government agreed to a cease fire. On July 21, the two parties signed the Accord of Kaurou to formally recognize the agreement. It was intended that the ex-fighters would be incorporated into the police force, but the Amerindian people fought against this proposition, saying that their people would be subjected to the will of the Jungle Commando and at their mercy. This would also call into question the status of the kin-ordered society. While the government, the National Assembly overseeing the matter, and the French government endorsed the agreement, the Surinamese Army rejected the idea of peace and continued to pursue members of the commando. On March 24, 1990, the presidential palace would serve as the nesting grounds of the people's government, about which talks resurfaced. These talks were helmed by the sitting president at the time, and they were attended by refugee leaders from France and members of the jungle commando. This attempt at peace quickly fell through as tensions in the government rose as the government was made aware of potential drug trafficking the militant group was involved with. Several days prior, an airplane containing over 100 kilos of cocaine was discovered in the Moengo area. After a military coup occurred again in 1991, the permanent council of the OAS issued an appeal in an attempt to reestablish the democratic order that had previously been unstated. One year later, in 1992, the newly elected president, Venetian, would introduce the Peace Commission, beginning the process that would ultimately cause the conflict between the jungle commando and its splinter groups and the Surinamese government to end.
