= Suriname National Army =

- Dutch: Nationaal Leger
- Founded: 1975
- Service branches: Surinamese Land Forces; Suriname Air Force; Suriname Coast Guard
- Headquarters: Paramaribo

Leadership
- Commander-in-chief: Jennifer Geerlings-Simons
- Minister of Defense: Uraiqit Ramsaram
- Commander of the Armed Forces: Brigade general Werner Kioe A Sen

Personnel
- Military age: 18
- Active personnel: 2,500

Expenditure
- Budget: US$60,000,000
- Percent of GDP: 0.7%

Industry
- Foreign suppliers: European Union; Brazil; India; China; Israel; Russia

Related articles
- History: 1980 Surinamese coup d'état Surinamese Interior War
- Ranks: Military ranks of Suriname

After the creation of the Statute of the Kingdom of the Netherlands, the Royal Netherlands Army was entrusted with the defence of Suriname, while the defence of the Netherlands Antilles was the responsibility of the Royal Netherlands Navy. The army set up a separate Netherlands Armed Forces in Suriname (Dutch: Troepenmacht in Suriname, TRIS). Upon independence in 1975, this force was turned into the Surinamese Armed Forces (Surinaamse Krijgsmacht, SKM). On February 25, 1980, a group of 15 non-commissioned officers and one junior officer, under the leadership of sergeant major Dési Bouterse, staged a coup d'état and overthrew the Government. Subsequently, the SKM was rebranded as the National Army (Nationaal Leger, NL).

The Netherlands has provided limited military assistance to the Surinamese armed forces since the election of a democratic government in 1991. In recent years, the United States has provided training to military officers and policymakers to promote a better understanding of the role of the military in a civilian government. Also, since the mid-1990s, the People's Republic of China has been donating military equipment and logistical material to the Surinamese Armed Forces, as has Brazil.

== Organization ==
Suriname's National Armed Forces are composed of some 2,500 personnel, the majority of whom are deployed in the Army of Suriname.

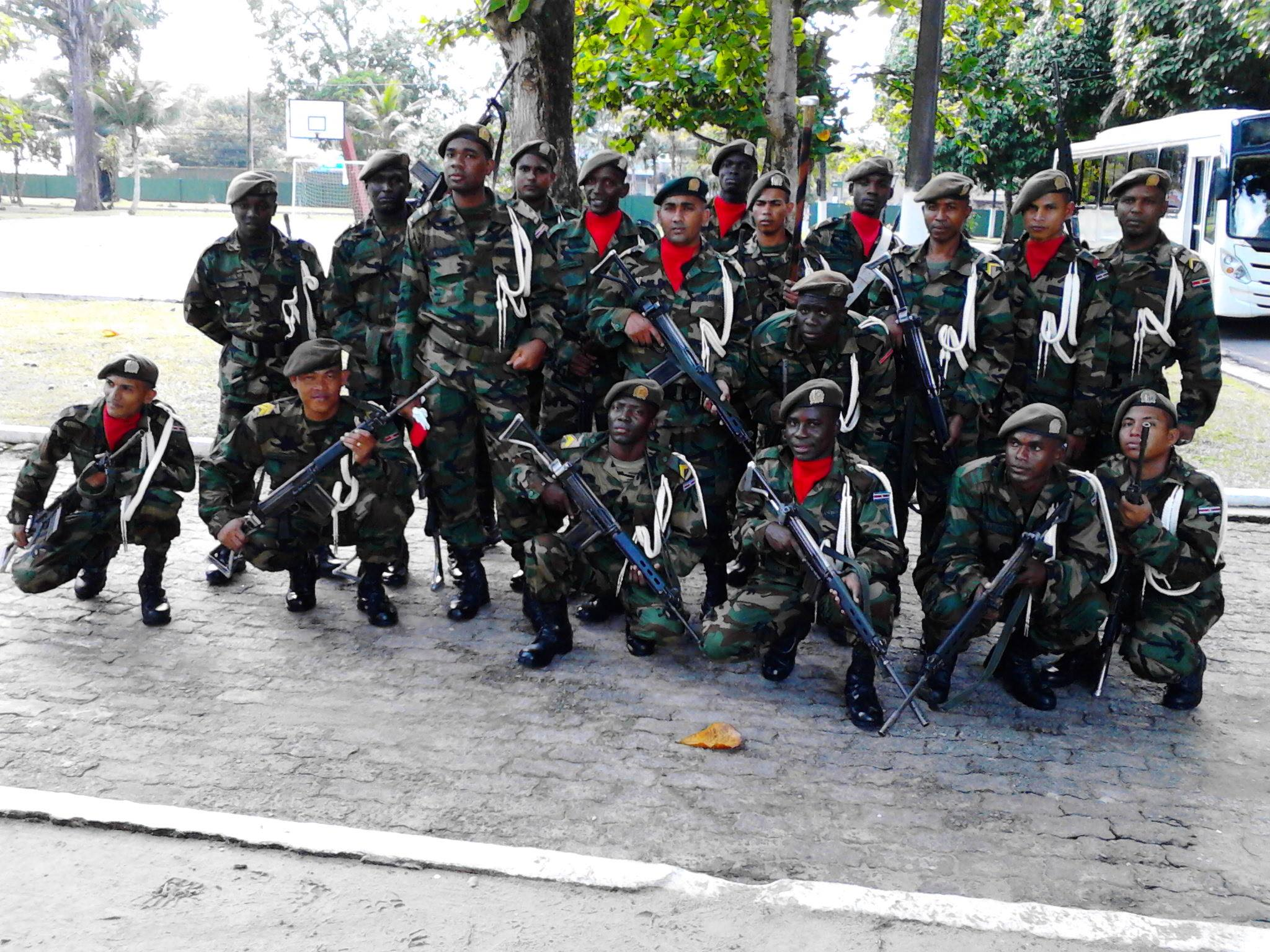
Suriname soldiers in Brazil

=== Army ===
- A Light Infantry Battalion (33ste Bataljon der Infanterie) Formed in 1987.
- A Special Forces Corps.
- A Support Arm. (Staf verzorgings Bataljon)
- A Military Police Corps.

=== Air Force ===
Roundel of the Suriname Air Force

In 1982 a small air arm was formed within the Suriname defense force called "Surinaamse Luchtmacht" in short also called LUMA. The first military aircraft of the young air force was a Hughes 500 - Model 369D helicopter, simply registered SAF-100 and being used for light observation tasks. However the aircraft crashed in March 1982 killing all five occupants (Major Henk Fernandes, second lieutenant Norman de Miranda, soldier Tjon a Kon and soldier Kowid and American pilot Foster Ford), but from May of the same year the Suriname Air Force was being equipped with four (Pilatus) Britten Norman BN-2B Defenders. Registered with the numbers SAF-001, SAF-002, SAF-003 and SAF-004. Later on during the decade a Cessna 172 Skyhawk (SAF-007), a Cessna 206 (SAF-200) and in 1993 a Cessna T303 Crusader (SAF-008) was acquired. The first official Suriname Air Force Commander from 1983 until 1989 was air force pilot lieutenant Eddie Alenso Savalie Djoe. He was one of the passenger victims of the Surinam Airways Flight 764 accident in June 1989, by then he was already promoted to the rank of Major.

All aircraft of the Suriname Air Force undertake border patrols, utility transport and SAR (Search & Rescue) missions from the main base at Paramaribo - Zorg en Hoop and are occasionally detached to Zanderij - Johan Adolf Pengel International Airport, Nieuw Nickerie - Major Fernandes Airfield, Albina Airstrip and Moengo Airstrip. In 1986 anti-government guerrilla activity prompted the government to acquire a pair of Aérospatiale SA.316B Alouette III (SAF-400 & SAF-500) helicopters from the Portuguese Air Force (Portuguese: Força Aérea Portuguesa), formerly registered FAP9350 & FAP9386. In the same year also three Pilatus PC-7's (SAF-111, SAF-112 & SAF-113) were ordered in Switzerland for COIN (Counter-Insurgency) missions. One of the Alouettes crashed and both delivered PC-7s were returned to Switzerland but one was later re-delivered. In 1987 a Bell 205 Iroquois (SAF-300) was acquired from Venezuela and used as a gunship for five years prior to sale to the US as N6594S in 1991. It crashed in July 1987 due to a mechanical failure killing the American pilot Billy Pearson, seriously injuring the American mechanic and four other Surinamese crewmembers. The helicopter was later repaired and back in action.

Two CASA 212-400s Aviocar transports (SAF-212 & SAF-214) Garret AiResearch TPE331-10HR turbo-prop engined aircraft were delivered in 1999. One of these two Spanish built CASA 212-400s is a Maritime Patrol Aircraft version (SAF-214) which was modified for the maritime patrol role with a Bendix RDR-1500 surveillance radar. Lack of spares and funding has hampered maintenance and sometimes grounding much of the SAF fleet. In 2012 six experts from Venezuela made an assessment for the Suriname Air Force on the rehabilitation of the Casa 212 airplanes and now the Suriname Air Force has sold them to Fayard Enterprises in the USA.

Three single engined Indian HAL Chetak helicopters were ordered in 2009. In a deal worth US$13.4 million with Hindustan Aeronautics Limited [HAL], facilitated through a line of credit from India. The deal was previous rumoured to include the more modern twin engined HAL Dhruv helicopters, but this proved to be wrong. On 26 December 2012 ten technical personnel of the Suriname Air Force left to India to be trained to become certified helicopter mechanics. In 2014 eight helicopter pilots from the Suriname Air Force were trained on operating the HAL Chetak helicopters in Bangalore, India. In 2014 it was announced that Suriname's order for helicopters from India was in fact for HAL Chetak and not the HAL Dhruv even as the Chetak production line was planned to be shut down. Rumours aside, by the end of January 2015 the three Indian Chetak helicopters were assembled and delivered in Suriname as SAF-H001 (c/n AH-350), SAF-H002 (c/n AH-351) & SAF-H003 (c/n AH-352). These registrations later changed to SAF-153, SAF-303 and SAF-811 when operational training started. The plan is to have one helicopter each based at the city of Paramaribo (Zorg en Hoop Airport), Nickerie (Major Henk Fernandes Airport) and Albina (Albina Airstrip). Finally on 13 March 2015 the helicopter fleet of three Chetaks was officially handed over by the Indian ambassador Subashini Murgesan to the Minister of Defence of Suriname Lamuré Latour in a ceremony at Zorg en Hoop. On the same day and occasion the Minister announced that a de Havilland Canada DHC-6 Twin Otter was about to be added to the airfleet of the Suriname Air Force shortly, with pilots already in training. Because of the financial crisis in Suriname, the Air Force has had to decommission one of its Chetaks.

==== Current inventory ====
Aircraft	Origin	Type	Variant	In service	Notes
Helicopters
HAL Chetak	India	SAR/Utility		3	1 Chetak equipped with an M2 Browning

==== Retired aircraft ====
Previous aircraft operated by the Air Wing include the Cessna 206, Pilatus PC-7, and Britten-Norman Islander. Helicopters included the Bell 205 and Alouette III.

=== Navy and Coast Guard ===
In 1977 the Navy (Marine) of Suriname received three large patrol vessels from the Dutch, built by De Vries Scheepsbouw. With a length of 32 meters each ship had two Paxman 12YHMC diesel engines of 1200HP performing a maximum speed of 20 knots. Delivery was between February 1977 and 1978 and the hull numbers were S-401, S-402 and S-403. Now all three are out of service, the last one S-401 later P-401 is still moored at the Marine Harbor. One was re-built as a luxurious yacht. All ships had their base at the Marine harbor on the Suriname river.

Today most of the fleet of the navy are based at Boxel, close to the resort town of Domburg in the Wanica District on the Suriname river.

In November 2012 The Ministry of Defense bought three patrol vessels for the Coast Guard. This order was worth 16 million euros. These patrol vessels will be used for fishery protection and to counterattack piracy in Surinamese waters. The first Fast Patrol Boat (P201), a 32 meters long, 6,3 meters wide FPB 98 type, was delivered in June 2013. The first boat arrived in Paramaribo with a container vessel from the port of Saint-Nazaire, France. The vessels can reach speeds of 30 knots. Delivery of the remaining two vessels (P101 & P102), FPB 72 types (24 meters long), occurred by the end of July, 2013. The Surinamese Government ordered the three vessels, accelerating planning to set up a coast guard for Suriname that will be deployed to conduct patrol duties and fight maritime crime activities like illegal fishing, drug trafficking, and piracy.

The coast guard is a branch of the Ministry of Internal Affairs. Soldiers were transferred from the Navy, to form the initial coast guard staff. The Maritime Authority of Suriname (MAS) is currently training 16 students from the Nature Technical Institute (NaTIn) and Technical Faculty of University of Suriname on how to conduct technical maintenance of the vessels. While the first three boats will barely be sufficient to patrol Suriname's territorial waters and combat maritime crime activities such piracy, rapid reaction is now possible.

The unit has its own base on the banks of the Suriname River in Paramaribo, with posts at the border with Guyana (in western District Nickerie) and French Guiana (in eastern District Marowijne). Legislation on which the coast guard will be founded is almost finished. It will soon be tabled in the Council of Ministers and the Council of State, after which it will head for the National Assembly for approval. The new unit is a civil organisation, with authority to enforce the law in Suriname territorial waters. The Surinamese government does not intend to make cuts to the Navy (Marine), once the Coast Guard is fully operational. The Navy will keep operating in the high seas outside the 100-nautical-mile (190-kilometre) zone.

== Command structure ==
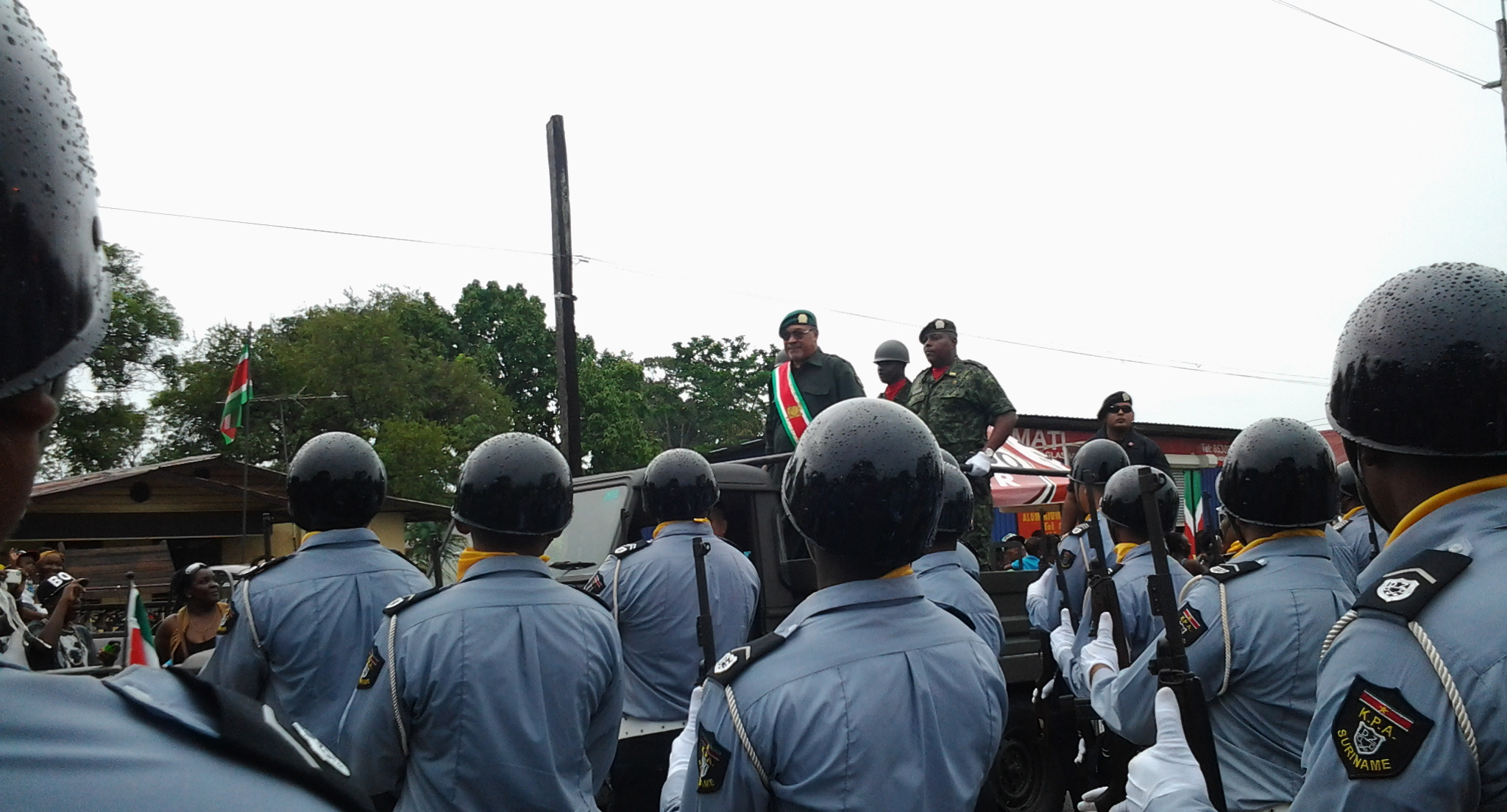
Then president Dési Bouterse, the Supreme Commander-in-Chief of the Armed Forces

The President of the Republic is the head of the armed forces, with the title of the Supreme Commander-in-Chief of the Armed Forces (Opperbevelhebber van de Strijdkrachten). The President is assisted by the Minister of Defence in his role over the armed forces.

Beneath the President and Minister of Defense is the Commander of the Armed Forces (Bevelhebber van de Strijdkrachten), Colonel Hedwig Gilaard, whose headquarters is in Paramaribo, was followed-up after three years by Colonel Ronni Benschop, who in turn was promoted to Brigade General in February 2014. This is the highest-ranked officer in the Armed Forces of Suriname ever.

The Commander called "Bevelhebber", is the Military Chief, charged with command over the different Military Branches. The Military Branches and regional Military Commands report to the Commander.

== Commanding officers of the Suriname Armed Forces ==
Information is as of 20 May 2026

- President Jennifer Geerlings-Simons Supreme Commander-in-Chief
- Uraiqit Ramsaran, Minister of Defence
- Rosette Wirokarso, Acting Director of Defence
- Brigadier General Mitchell J. Labadie, Commander of the National Army
- Colonel Ashokkoemar Jagdew, Commander of the Army
- Colonel Bob Mangal, Chief of the General Staff
- Lieutenant Colonel Johny Ebeciljodi, Commander of the Navy
- Colonel Marven van Huisduinen, Commander of the Air Force (Luchtmacht)
- Lieutenant Colonel Ashokkoemar Jagdew, Commander of the Army (Landmacht)
- Lieutenant Colonel Roy Samuels, Commander of the Military Police Corps
- Lieutenant Colonel Vernon Pengel, Deputy Director of Personnel Affairs
- Lieutenant Colonel Yuri Kasandiredjo, Deputy Director of Equipment and Logistics
- Major Jeffin Geijsvliet, Deputy Director of Finance

=== Commanders of the Suriname Armed Forces ===
The Armed Forces is headquartered in Paramaribo.

The task of the national army of Suriname is defending the sovereignty and territorial integrity of Suriname against foreign armed military aggression. That is, the defense of not only the territory but also the territorial waters and the airspace above it.

The Ministry of Defence consists of the Policy Centre and the operational part (the national army) that makes up the Defence Organization. The Ministry of Defence has no departments. There are various services and units. The Policy Centre is responsible for the care of the armed forces so that timely and adequate it can perform the duties or missions assigned to it by law in an efficient and effective manner. Providing assistance to international organizations, if and to the extent that command is given for that purpose by the relevant authority. This is e.g. for humanitarian operations of the United Nations. Also providing assistance in the preparation and implementation of projects related to the socio-economic development of Suriname.

There are several military installations, barracks and detachments in the various districts including the Memre Boekoe barracks (Paramaribo), the Naval Marine base (Wanica District), the Air Force Luma base (Zorg en Hoop, Paramaribo), the training centre for recruits namely the Ayoko barracks and the detachment Zanderij, the eastern border post, the Akontoe Velantie Kazerne at Albina, in Nickerie the western border post, the Professor Dr. Ali Kazerne and on the Kennedy Highway to Concordia the 1st Sgt Martowidjojo Kazerne. There are also various detachments and the so-called small stations throughout Suriname in the districts Sipaliwini, Saramacca, Brokopondo and Para. But also the protection of important objects such as the Afobaka Dam or the bridge over the Coppename River in Bitagron belong to the protective task of the National Army of Suriname.

== Conflicts ==
=== Surinamese Interior War ===
The Armed Forces of Suriname were engaged in a domestic war against a few hundred rebels who named themselves "Jungle Commandos" led by Ronnie Brunswijk between 1986 and 1992.

Surinamese armed forces also fought against the Resistance Amerindian groups who called themselves "Tucayana Amazonas" and were led by Alex Jubitana and Thomas Sabajo. These Amerindian insurgents fought from 1986 to 1989. They opposed the expropriation of land owned by indigenous people and discrimination by the military regime.

== Role ==
- Defend the territorial integrity of Suriname.
- Assist the civil power in the maintenance of law and order when required.
- Contribute to the economic development of Suriname.

The Army also participated in the Multi-National Force in Haiti in the 90's and were redeployed in 2010.

== Army ranks ==
Suriname shares a rank structure similar to that of the Netherlands.

=== Commissioned officer ranks ===
The rank insignia of commissioned officers.

Rank group	General / flag officers	Senior officers			Junior officers
Suriname Army
Suriname Army	Brigadegeneraal	Kolonel	Luitenant-kolonel	Majoor	Kapitein/ Ritmeester	Eerste luitenant	Tweede luitenant

=== Other ranks ===
The rank insignia of non-commissioned officers and enlisted personnel.

Rank group	Senior NCOs				Junior NCOs		Enlisted
Suriname Army
Suriname Army	Adjudant	Sergeant-majoor	Sergeant der 1e klasse	Sergeant	Korporaal der 1e klasse	Korporaal	Soldaat der 1e klasse	Soldaat

== Naval equipment ==
- 7 patrol boats
- River Patrol Boat
- Inflatable boat
- Tug T-001 - ex-East German Navy Project 1381 Type 414 Karl Heinz I
- Patrol Vessels (5)
- P201 (FPB 98 type patrol boat)
- P101 (FPB 72 type patrol boat)
- P102 (FPB 72 type patrol boat)

== Future ==
On 12 September 2012, Surinamese defense minister, Lamouré Latour, discussed with the Brazilian defense minister the possibility of the Military of Suriname acquiring from two to four Brazilian Embraer AT-29B Super Tucano light attack (COIN) trainer planes, 500 ton light patrol ships and the revitalization of the armoured vehicles supplied from Brazil in 1983.

== Equipment ==
Small arms
Type	Origin	Caliber	Details
Beretta 92	Italy	9x19mm	Seen in use during training with U.S. Forces.
IMI Uzi	Israel	9x19mm	
AKM	Soviet Union	7.62x39mm	
FN FAL	Belgium	7.62x51mm	Main rifle used by Army.
FN F2000	Belgium	5.56x45mm	Used by some units.
CETME Model L	Spain	5.56x45mm	Seen in a parade.
FAMAS	France	5.56x45mm	France has donated several hundred FAMAS bullpup rifles to Suriname’s armed forces.
ZPU-1	Soviet Union		

Vehicles
Type	Origin	Quantity	Details
EE-9 Cascavel	Brazil	45	
EE-11 Urutu	Brazil	16	
DAF YP-408	Netherlands	50+	
DAF YA440 trucks	Netherlands		With M-55 anti-aircraft guns.

== See also ==
- Suriname Air Force
- Sportvereniging Nationaal Leger
