= Pikin Santi =

Pikin Santi Pikien Santi
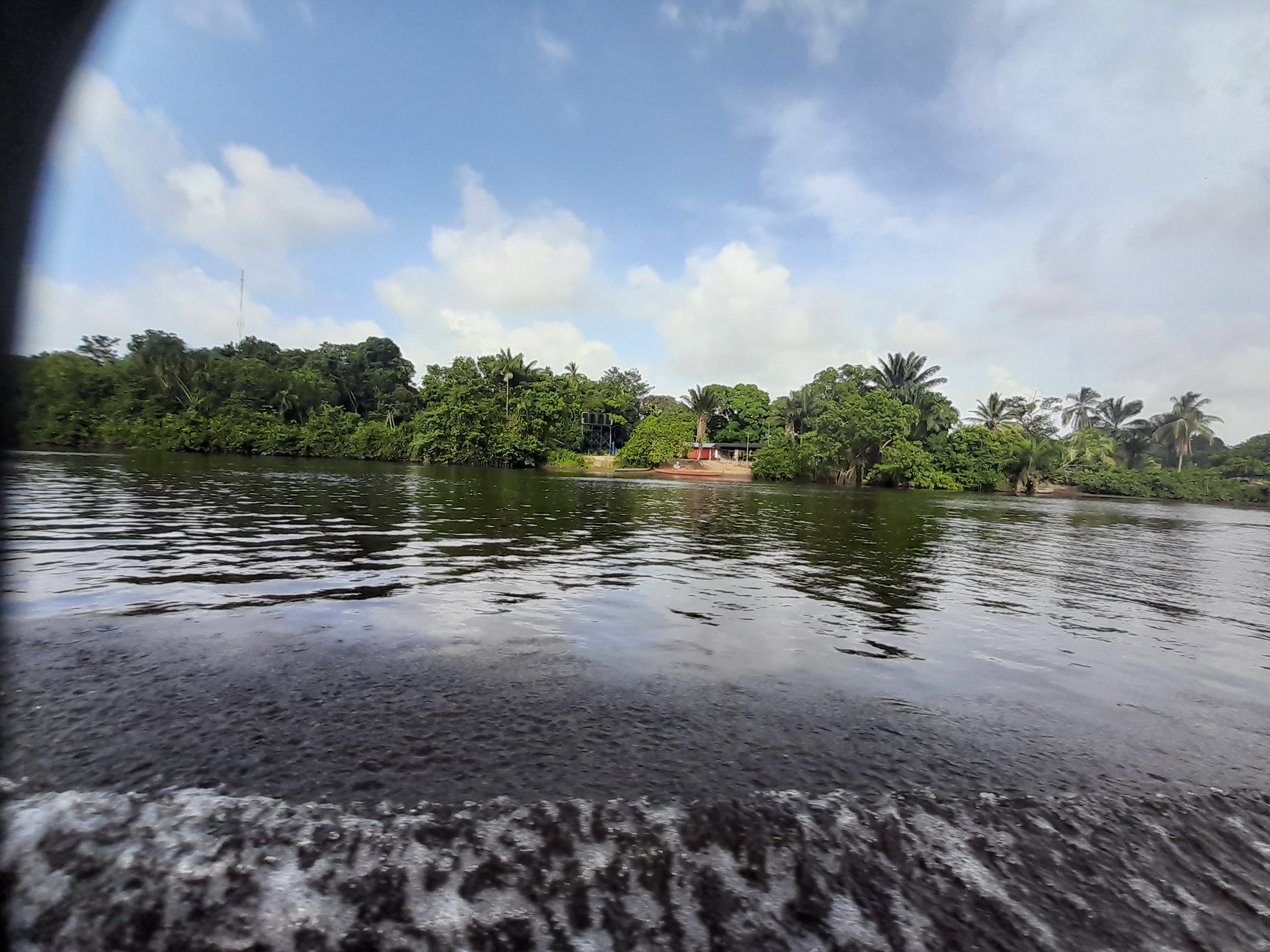

- Location in Suriname
- Coordinates: 5°47′7″N 54°22′17″W
- Country: Suriname
- District: Marowijne District
- Resort (municipality): Wanhatti

Government
  - Captain: Da Asomi
  - Captain: Ma Ayana

Population (2006)
  - Total: 300

Pikin Santi, sometimes spelt as Pikien Santi, is a Ndyuka village on the Cottica River in Suriname inhabited by the Pinasi and Piika lo. Pikin Santi is situated upstream from Pinatjaimi and Lantiwei, and downstream from Tamarin. It lies in the vicinity of the Buku creek and should therefore be close to the ruins Fort Buku, which as of yet have not been identified.

== History ==
Like all Ndyuka villages in the Cottica River area, Pikin Santi was settled somewhere in the early 19th century, when the peace treaty concluded between the Ndyuka and the Dutch colonial authorities in 1760 allowed Maroons to move to the plantation colony without running the risk of being caught by colonial military forces. The Ndyuka settled logging camps in the Cottica area, and lived off the profits of selling wood. The people of Pikin Santi belong to the matrilineal clans or lo of Pinasi and Piika, which are both members of the Miáfiyabakaa federation, and originally stem from the Aduwataa area on the Tapanahony River.

The Dutch anthropologist André Köbben conducted anthropological field work in the Cottica area in the 1960s. He was based in the village of Langa Uku further upstream.

During the Surinamese Interior War, Pikin Santi was attacked by the Suriname National Army. Subsequently, the village was almost completely abandoned, with most of its residents fleeing to either French Guiana or the Surinamese capital of Paramaribo. A few families under the leadership of Captain Kodyo remained in bush camps near the Buku creek until the end of the war.

== Education ==
Pikin Santi does not have a school of its own, and all school-going children are transported daily by river canoe to the primary school in the former Catholic mission station of Tamarin.

== Transportation ==
Transport is provided by boat taxis operated by the Nationaal Vervoerbedrijf (NVB) and Scheepvaartmaatschappij Suriname (SMS) at regular intervals, departing from Moengo.

== Archaeology ==
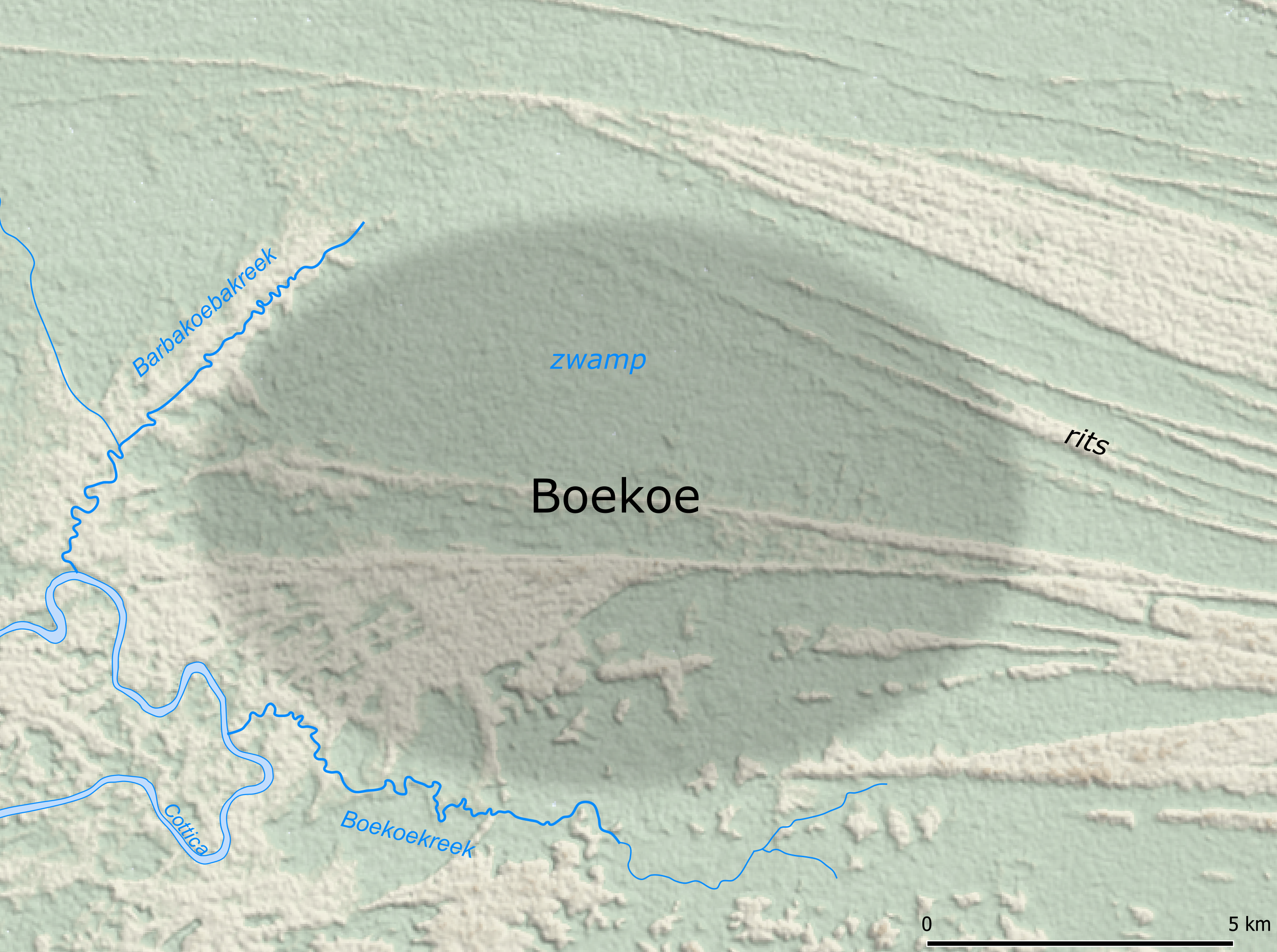
The approximate location of Fort Buku. The Buku creek (Dutch: Boekoekreek) is indicated at the bottom of the map.

Pikin Santi lies in the vicinity of the ruins of Fort Buku, a famous Aluku Maroon fort of the Boni War that fell in 1772. Archaeologists have tried to locate the fort in 1997, 2002, 2004, and 2011. So far, no expedition has been able to locate the ruins of the fort, although an elevation consistent with a military report was found, as well as fragments of metal, pottery and glass.
