= Wanhatti =

- Resort
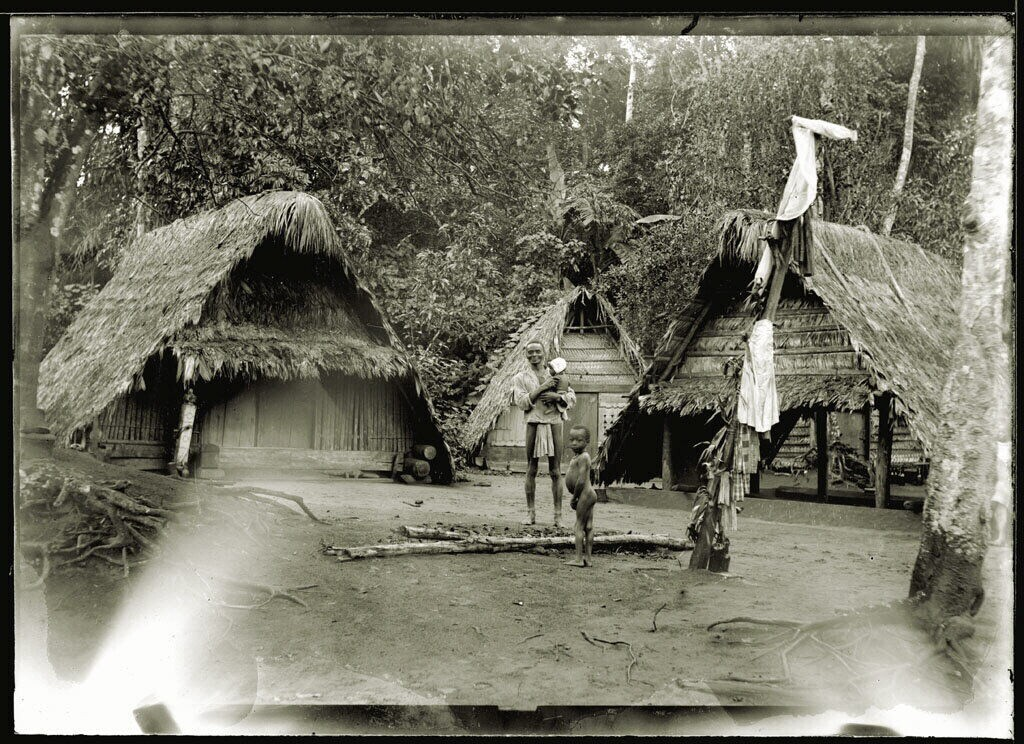
- Wanhatti (1896)

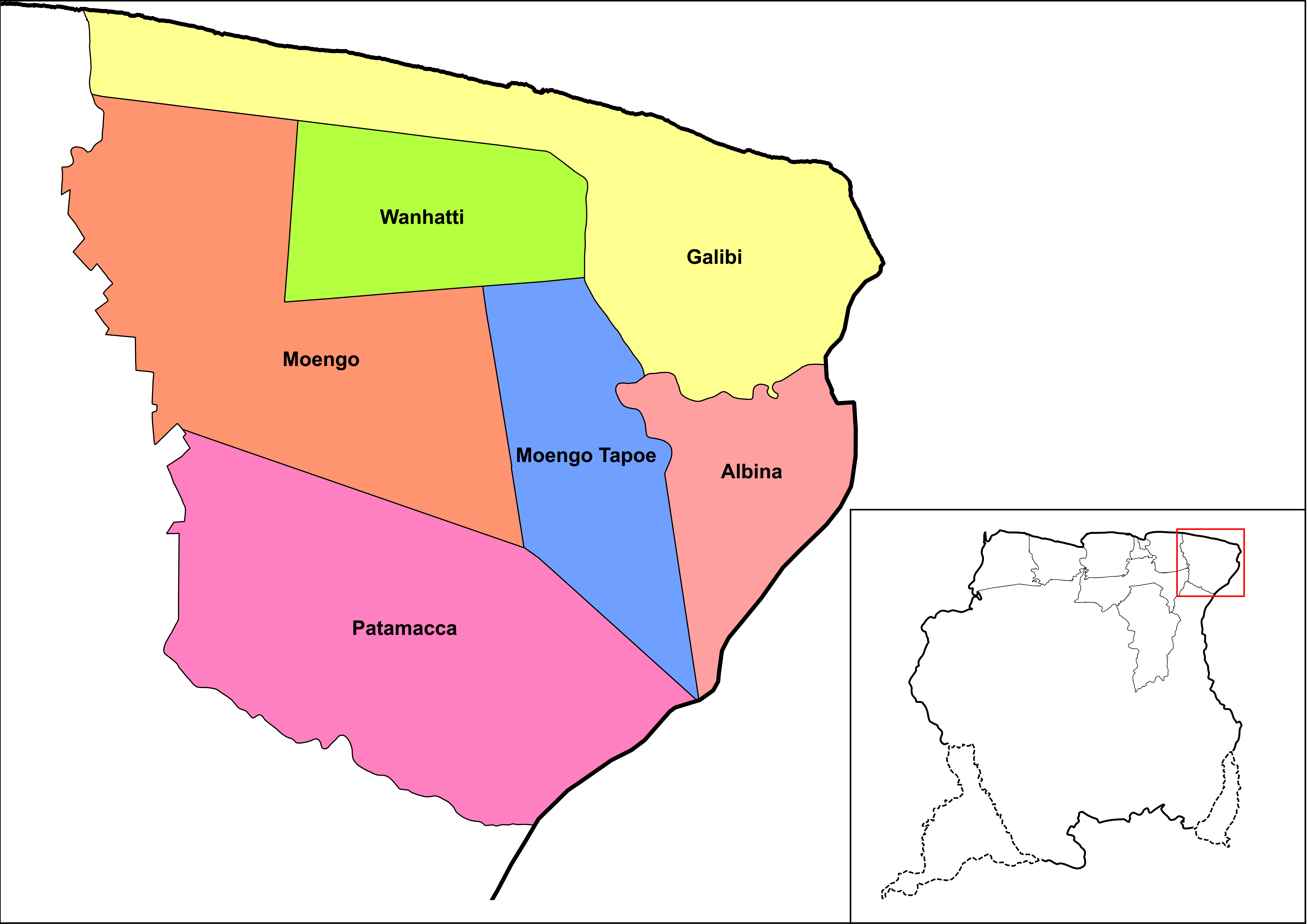
- Map showing the resorts of Marowijne District. Wanhatti

- Wanhatti in Suriname
- Coordinates: 5°46′59″N 54°27′22″W
- Country: Suriname
- District: Marowijne District

Area
  - Total: 461 km^{2} (178 sq mi)
- Elevation: 0 m (0 ft)

Population (2012)
  - Total: 468
  - Density: 1.02/km^{2} (2.63/sq mi)
- Time zone: UTC-3 (AST)

Wanhatti is a village and resort in Suriname, located in the Marowijne district on the Cottica River. The resort is inhabited by the Ndyuka Maroons, and has a population of 468 people as of 2012. The village is primarily inhabited by Ndyuka of the Ansu clan or lo.

== Name ==
Wanhatti means "one heart" in both Sranan Tongo and Ndyuka and refers to the fact that the village is a merger of the villages of Agiti Ondoo and Walimbumofu.

== History ==
Agiti Ondoo was the site of a Gaan Gadu shrine.

In 1972, a road was built to connect Wanhatti to the East-West Link. The road partially uses the path of the old defence line, build between 1770 and 1778 to protect the plantations of the Colony of Suriname against attacks by the Maroons. The road improved conditions in the village, and it now has a school, and a connection to the telephone network. The Surinamese Interior War fought during the 1980s left its toll on the resort, and caused a large part of the population to flee. In September 2010, a health care clinic was opened in the village. In 2011, the road was extended to reach the village Lantiwee, and it is hoped that this will lead to a return of farmers in the area. On 3 June 2011, a library was opened in the village.

Besides Wanhatti itself, the resort contains among others the villages of Lantiwee, Pikin Santi, Pinatjaimi, and Tamarin.

== Aluku Maroons ==
Fort Buku, a famous Aluku Maroon fort of the Boni War that fell in 1772, is located within the Wanhatti resort, however the fort itself still has to be discovered as of 2020. The Ndyuka signed a peace treaty in 1760. Boni also desired a peace treaty, but the Society of Suriname, despite contrary advice from the Dutch government, wanted to persecute and destroy the Aluku. In 1777, the French send a diplomatic mission to Suriname, to discuss the refugee crisis.
