= Ricanau Mofo =

Ricanau Mofo Ricanaumofo
- Village
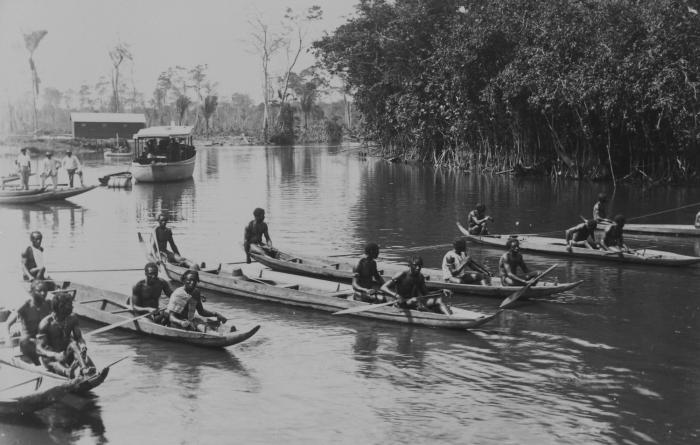
- Rowing contest near Ricanau Mofo (early 20th century)

- Location in Suriname
- Coordinates: 5.6775°N 54.423611°W
- Country: Suriname
- District: Marowijne District
- Resort: Moengo

Government
  - Captain: Meizak Banwarie

Ricanau Mofo, also Ricanaumofo, is a village of Ndyuka Maroons in the Moengo resort of the Marowijne District of Suriname. The village can be accessed from the East-West Link via Moengo. Ricanau Mofo is located on the Cottica River.

== Overview ==
Ricanau Mofo has a school and a health clinic. The village is connected to the electricity grid, and in July 2019, construction started on supplying the village with clean drinking water.

The economy of the village is based on agriculture with an emphasis on producing ginger, arrowleaf elephant ear (tayer), and bananas. Tayer is the basis of the popular Suriname dish pom. In 2019, a Farmers Field School was opened in the village.
