= Honorary Order of the Yellow Star =

Surinamese order

Honorary Order of the Yellow Star Ere-Orde van de Gele Ster
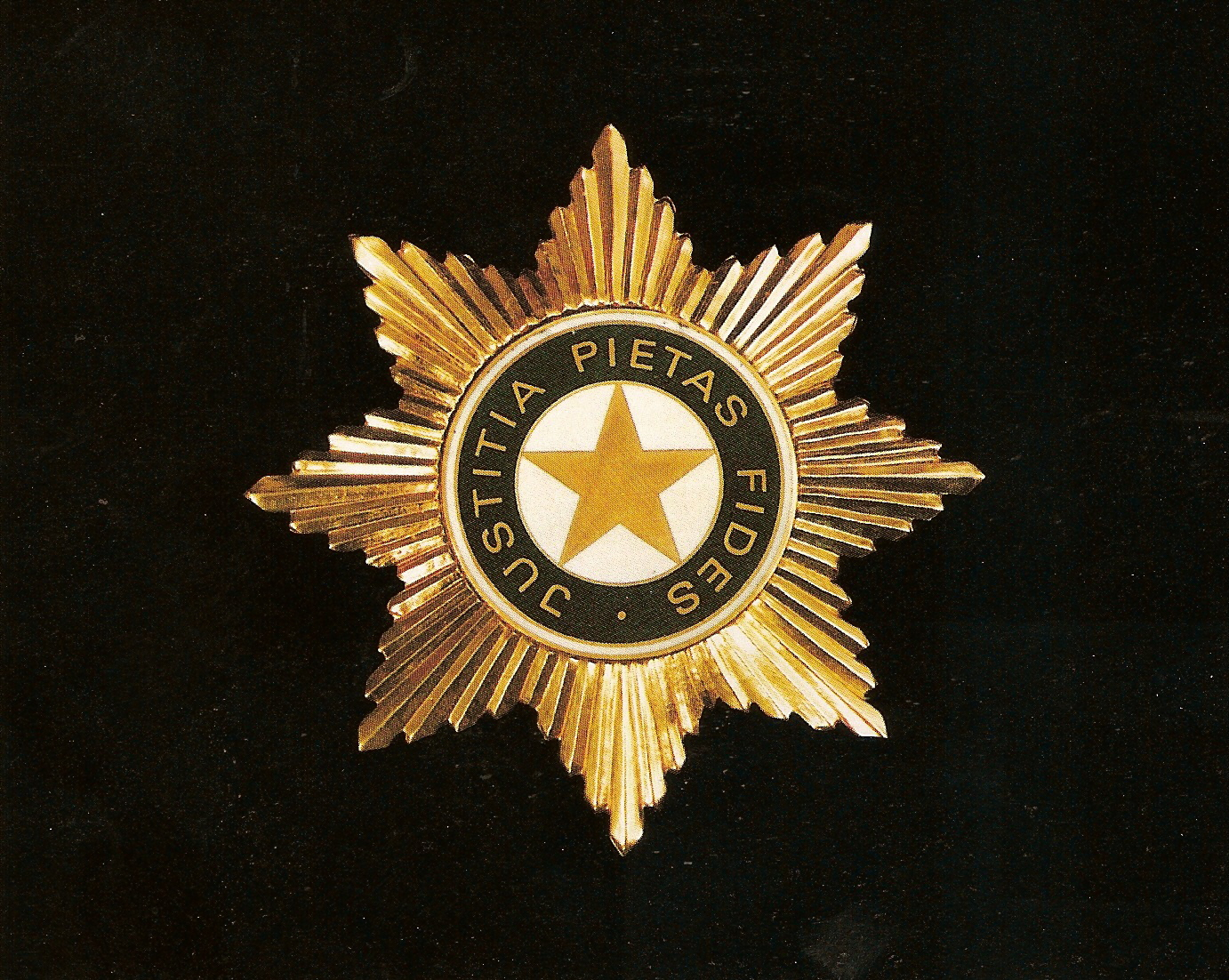
- Star of the order

Awarded by Republic of Suriname
- Type: Order with five classes and two medals
- Established: 25 November 1975
- Motto: JUSTITIA PIETAS FIDES (Justice Piety Fidelity).
- Eligibility: Surinamese nationals or some distinguished foreign persons
- Awarded for: Those who made important contributions to the Surinamese state or society
- Status: Currently constituted
- Grand Master: HE Dr. Jennifer Geerlings-Simons
- Grades: Grand Cordon; Grand Officer; Commander; Officer; Knight

Precedence
- Next (higher): None (highest)
- Next (lower): Honorary Order of the Palm
- Ribbon bar of the order

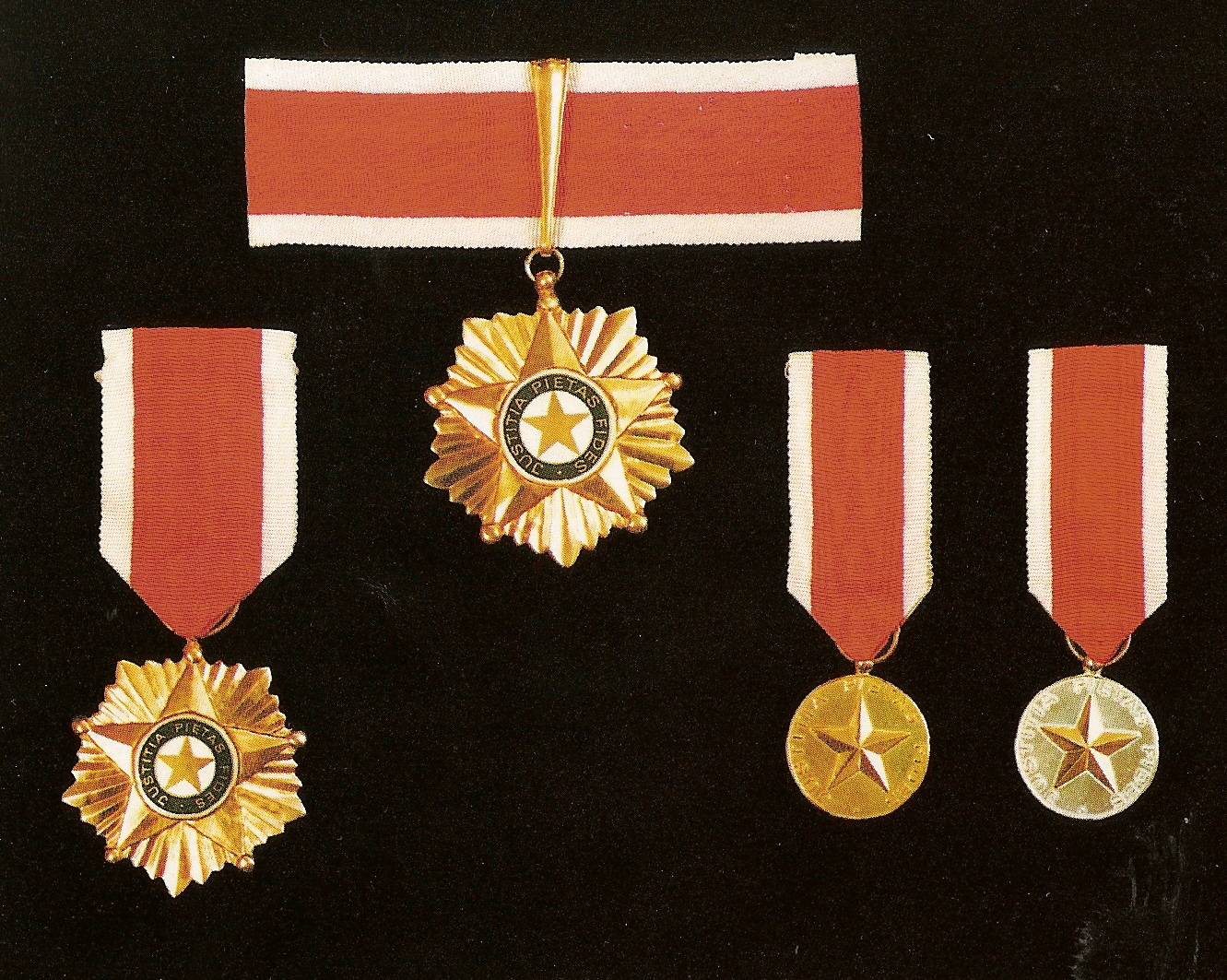
Honorary Order of the Yellow Star and Honorary Medals in Gold and Silver

The Honorary Order of the Yellow Star (Dutch: Ere-Orde van de Gele Ster) is the highest state decoration of the Republic of Suriname. The Order was instituted in 1975 at the independence of Suriname and replaced the Dutch Order of the Netherlands Lion. It is awarded to individuals for their meritorious service to the Surinamese people or nation. Foreigners are also eligible to receive the order. The president of Suriname is the Grand Master of the order.

== Classes ==
The Honorary Order of the Yellow Star is issued in five classes, plus two medals:

- Grand Cordon (Grootlint), who wears the badge on a sash on the right shoulder, plus the star on the left side of the chest;
- Grand Officer (Grootofficier), who wears a badge on a necklet, plus a star on the left side of the chest;
- Commander (Commandeur), who wears the badge on a necklet;
- Officer (Officier), who wears the badge on a ribbon with rosette on the left side of the chest;
- Knight (Ridder), who wears the badge on a ribbon on the left side of the chest.
- Honorary Medals in Gold and Silver on a ribbon on the left chest

The president of Suriname as Grand Master wears the Grand Order Chain (Groot Ordeketen) of the order. In addition, select foreign heads of state may be honoured with the Grand Order Chain.

== Insignia ==
The Collar of the Order, formally the Grand Order Chain, is in gold, with alternating the "Sen" (S-shaped monogram) and gold stars as facets, connected with small chains. The whole chain rests on a folded Ribbon of the order that culminates in two bows. The bows are worn on the shoulders.

The Badge of the order exists of a gold gilt five-pointed star each topped with a small ball, and gold gilt rays between the arms, resulting in a badge with the shape of a pentagon. The central disk shows the yellow star of the flag and coat of arms of Suriname on white enamel, surrounded by a black enamel and gold edged ring displaying the motto in yellow (also from the Surinamese coat of arms): JUSTITIA - PIETAS - FIDES ("Justice - Piety - Fidelity").

The Star of the Order is an eight-pointed gold gilt star with straight rays. The central disc is the same as that of the badge.

The Medal is round, with a gold and silver version. It shows the five-pointed star and a surrounding circlet with the motto of the order.

The Ribbon of the order is red with white stripes at the edges.

== Controversy ==
After his inauguration in 2010, the Surinamese president Dési Bouterse immediately honoured all nine still living conspirators, who together with Bouterse were involved in the 1980 Surinamese coup d'état, with the Grand Cordon of the Honorary Order of the Yellow Star. This led internationally to great controversy, since all nine are accused of involvement in the December murders in 1982, when thirteen civilians and two military officials were murdered because they opposed the military rule in Suriname.

== Selected recipients ==
- Jules Ajodhia, a Surinamese politician and former Vice-President of Suriname
- Prince Bernhard of Lippe-Biesterfeld, prince consort of Queen Juliana
- Edwin W. Carrington, former Secretary-General of the Caribbean Community (CARICOM)
- Princess Beatrix of the Netherlands, former Queen Regnant of the Kingdom of the Netherlands
- Princess Juliana of the Netherlands, former Queen Regnant of the Kingdom of the Netherlands
- Princess Margriet of the Netherlands, member of the Dutch royal family
- Michiel van Kempen, Dutch writer
- Gazon Matodya, former paramount chief (Granman) of the Ndyuka people
- Johanna Schouten-Elsenhout, poet
- Jules Sedney, a Surinamese politician and former Prime Minister of Suriname
- Clarence Seedorf, Surinamese-Dutch football player
- Tyrone Spong, Surinamese-Dutch Kickboxer and boxer
- Ronald Venetiaan, a Surinamese politician and former President of Suriname
- Roué Verveer, a Surinamese-Dutch comedian, television presenter and actor
- Pieter van Vollenhoven, member of the Dutch Royal House and husband of Princess Margriet of the Netherlands
- Teodoro Obiang Nguema Mbasogo, President of Equatorial Guinea
- Sri Sri Ravi Shankar, Founder The Art of Living Foundation
- Droupadi Murmu, President of India
- King Willem-Alexander of the Netherlands
- Queen Máxima of the Netherlands
