= Kananoe Apetina =

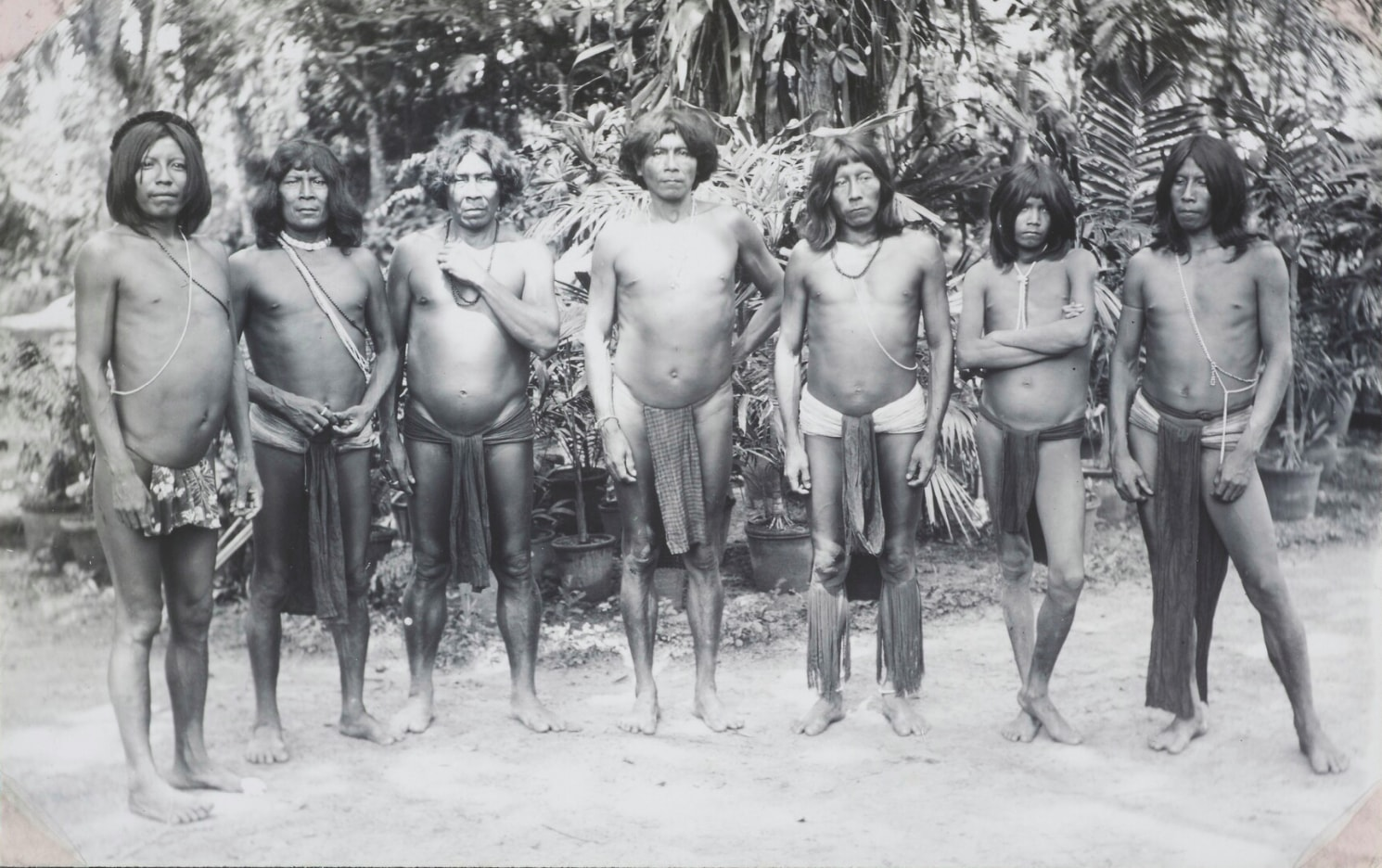
- Kananoe Apetina with his followers upon arrival in Paramaribo, photographed by Augusta Curiel

Granman of the Wayana in Suriname
- Reign: 1952 – 11 April 1975
- Predecessor: none
- Successor: Aptuk Noewahe
- Born: ca. 1885; Pará, Brazil
- Died: 11 April 1975; Paramaribo, Suriname
- Spouse: Malopa

Kananoe Apetina (ca. 1885 – 11 April 1975) was a Wayana chief, who first in 1937 was recognized by the colonial authorities of Suriname as a captain, and who subsequently in 1952 was recognized by governor Jan Klaasesz as granman of the Wayana of the Tapanahony River in Suriname. Apetina died in 1975 and was succeeded as granman by Aptuk Noewahe in 1976.

== Biography ==
Apetina was the founder of the village of Wehejok. During 1936–1937, Apetina was encountered by the colonial explorers of the Second Surinamese Border Expedition. Upon the return of the expedition to the Surinamese capital of Paramaribo, Apetina and a few other Wayana joined the expedition leaders in order to be received by governor Johannes Kielstra. Kielstra bestowed the title of captain upon Apetina and presented him with a rifle and a Dutch flag.

Upon the instigation of Baptist missionaries of the West Indies Mission, Apetina founded the village of Pïlëuwimë in 1956, at the site of a camp that was previously used to facilitate trade with the Ndyuka people. Over time, most Wayana living on the Paloemeu and Tapanahony rivers migrated to Pïlëuwimë.

Kananoe Apetina died on 11 April 1975 in the Diakonessenhuis in Paramaribo, and was buried with the rifle and the Dutch flag that were given to him by governor Kielstra in 1937.

== Personal life ==
Kananoe Apetina had three wives and five children.
