= Ndyuka =

Ndyuka may refer to:

- Ndyuka language, a creole language of Suriname, spoken by the Ndyuka people
- Ndyuka people, a Maroon ethnic group who live in the eastern part of Suriname
