= Pinatjaimi =

Pinatjaimi Pinatyaimi Pinatjarimi
- Village
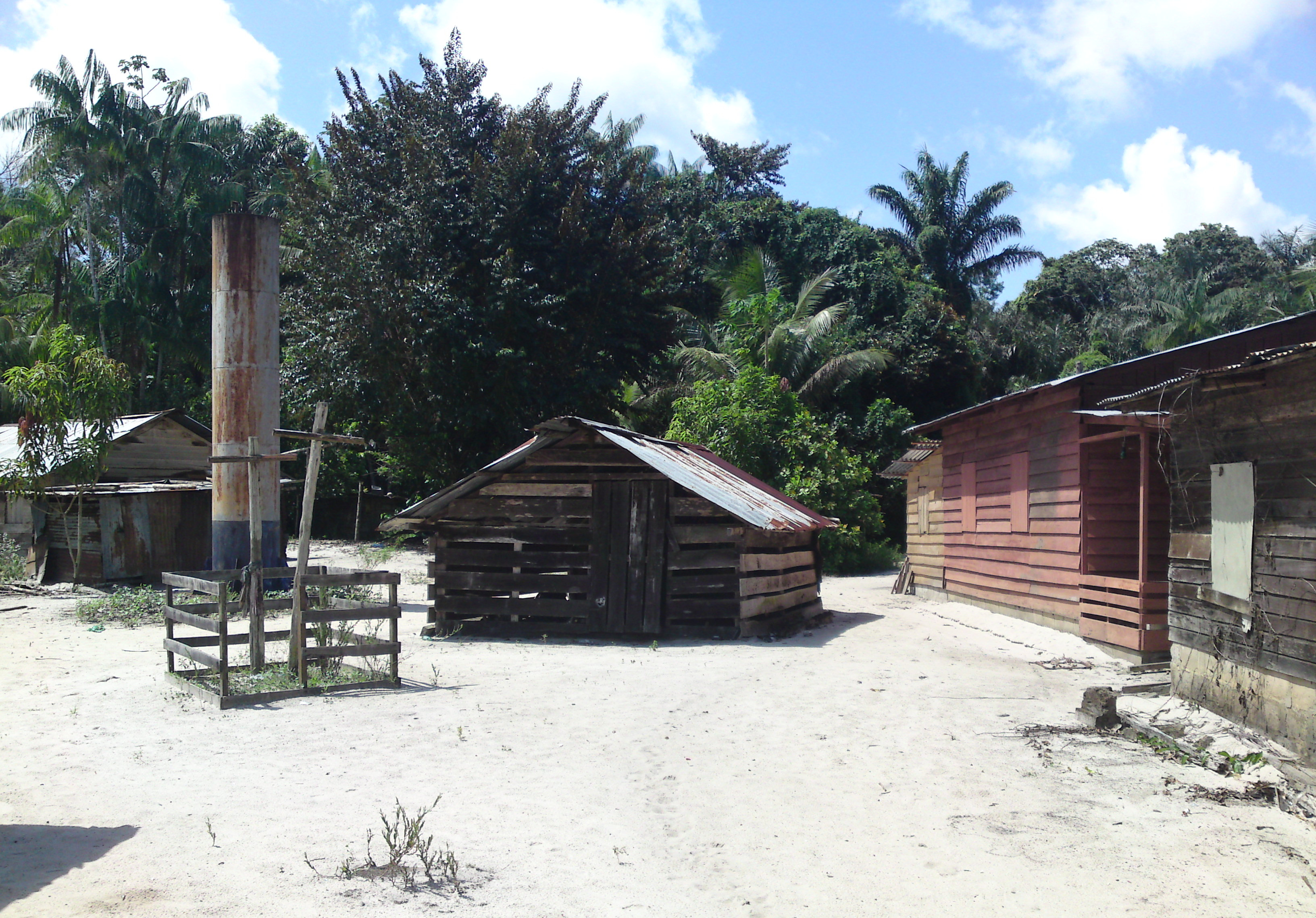
- Pinatyaimi (2014)

- Location in Suriname
- Coordinates: 5°47′37″N 54°24′40″W
- Country: Suriname
- District: Marowijne District
- Resort (municipality): Wanhatti

Government
  - Captain: Da Tama Vogelland
  - Captain: Da Awana

Pinatjaimi, also spelled as Pinatyaimi, is a Ndyuka Maroon village on the Cottica River in Suriname.

== Geography ==
Pinatjaimi lies opposite the village of Lantiwei, from where it was once founded. The people of Pinatyaimi are of the Pinas and Dyu clan or lo. Before the Suriname Guerrilla War there was a school in Pinatjaimi. In the war, the village was only slightly damaged, but most of its inhabitants fled to either French Guiana or to Paramaribo.

The village has two captains, Da Tama and Da Awana.

== Name ==
The name Pinatjaimi comes from the Ndyuka pina tyai mi which means "poverty brought me here". It is said that Pinatjaimi was founded by a couple from Lantiwei after family problems. The Sranan Tongo equivalent of pina tyai mi would be pina tjari mi, under which name the village is also sometimes known.
