= Marowijne =

Marowijne (Dutch pronunciation: [ˌmaːroːˈʋɛi̯nə]) may be referring to any one of the following:

- Marowijne District
- Marowijne River
