= Aukan =

Aukan may refer to:

- Aukan, Burma
- Ndyuka people, who are also called "Aukan"
- Ndyuka language, also called "Aukan"
