= Tamarin (disambiguation) =

Tamarin can have various meanings:

- Tamarins are any of the small squirrel-like monkeys of South America in the genus Saguinus of the family Cebidae.
  - Lion tamarins are closely related to the tamarins, and are in genus Leontopithecus.
- Tamarin (software) is a free ActionScript and ECMAScript virtual machine and JIT compiler.
- Tamarin Prover (software) is a computer software program for formal verification of cryptographic protocols.
- Tamarin, Mauritius is a village on the island country of Mauritius.
- Tamarin, Suriname is a village in Suriname.
- Tamarin, a 3D action platformer and spiritual successor to Jet Force Gemini by Chameleon Games

== See also ==
- Tamaran
- Tamarind
