= Lantiwei =

Lantiwei Lantiwee
- Village
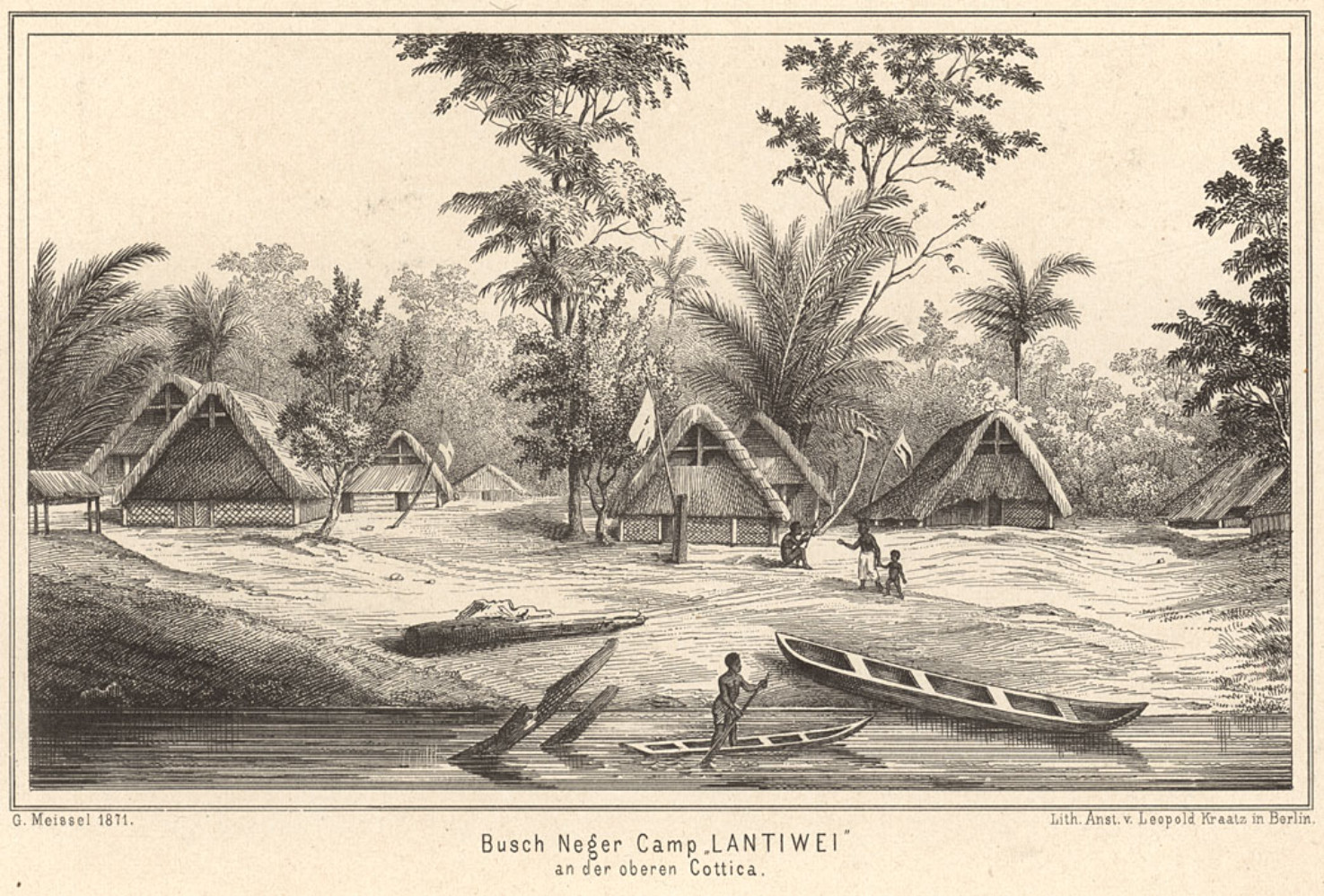
- Drawing of Lantiwei (1874)

- Location in Suriname
- Coordinates: 5°47′24″N 54°24′44″W
- Country: Suriname
- District: Marowijne District
- Resort (municipality): Wanhatti

Government
  - Captain: Da Wetipai
  - Captain: Da Naloi

Lantiwei, also spelled as Lantiwee and Lantiwé, is a Ndyuka Maroon village on the Cottica River in Suriname. Lantiwei lies opposite the village of Pinatjaimi, with Lantiwei being the village the people of Pinatjaimi originated from.

During the Boni-wars the colonial army build the camp ‘s Lands Welvaren soon to be nicknamed by the soldiers as Devil's harwar (harbour) because of the many soldiers who were killed by tropical diseases.

In 1980, the Baptist missionary Anne Dreisbach set up a clinic in the village with the permission of the captain at the time. She is still serving the Cottica villages with medical services.

During the Suriname Guerrilla War, many people fled to either French Guiana or to Paramaribo.

Since 2011, there has been a road connecting Lantiwei to the East-West Link, via the laterite road that had already connected Wanhatti since 1972.
