= Ovia Olo =

Ovia Olo Ovillanhollo
- Village
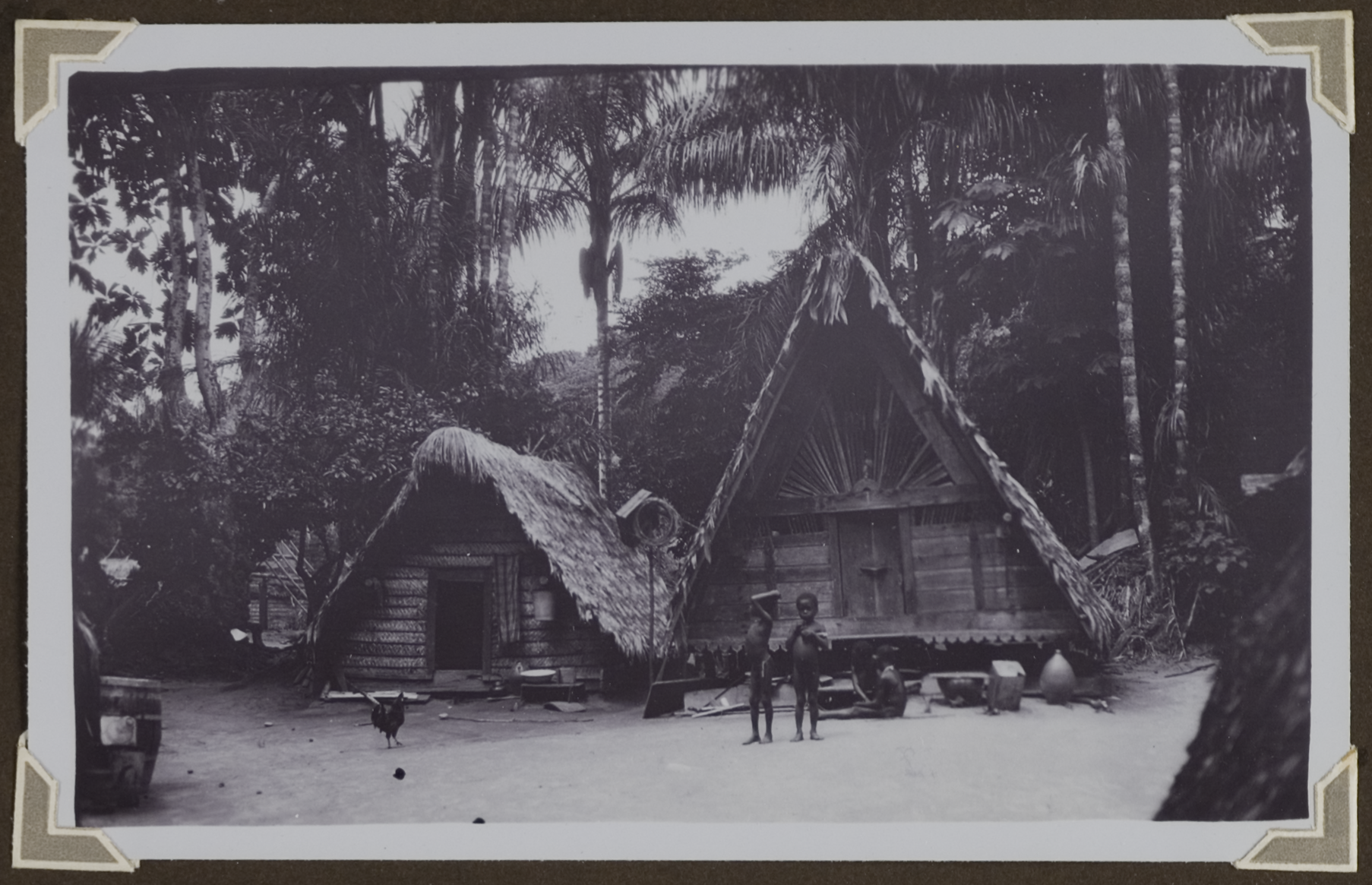
- Children in front of house ijn Ovia Olo (c. 1930)

- Location in Suriname
- Coordinates: 5.513056°N 54.408333°W
- Country: Suriname
- District: Marowijne District
- Resort: Patamacca

Population (2017)
  - Total: c.300

Ovia Olo, also Ovillanhollo, is a village of Ndyuka Maroons in the Patamacca resort of the Marowijne District of Suriname.

Electricity for the village is provided by diesel generators. The village does not have a school.

In 2011, the Marowijne Art Park was opened on the East-West Link near Ovia Olo. The Art Park consists of works of art made by international artists, and contributions from the children of Moengo, Ovia Olo and Ricanaumofo.

In 2016, Zhong Heng Tai Investment was given permission to start a 40,000 hectares palm oil plantation even though the village authorities had voted against the plan in 2005. The village was initially not opposed to the plan until the scale was revealed. A smaller plantation had existed near the village between 1975 and 1980, but was destroyed during the Surinamese Interior War.
