= Johanna Schouten-Elsenhout =

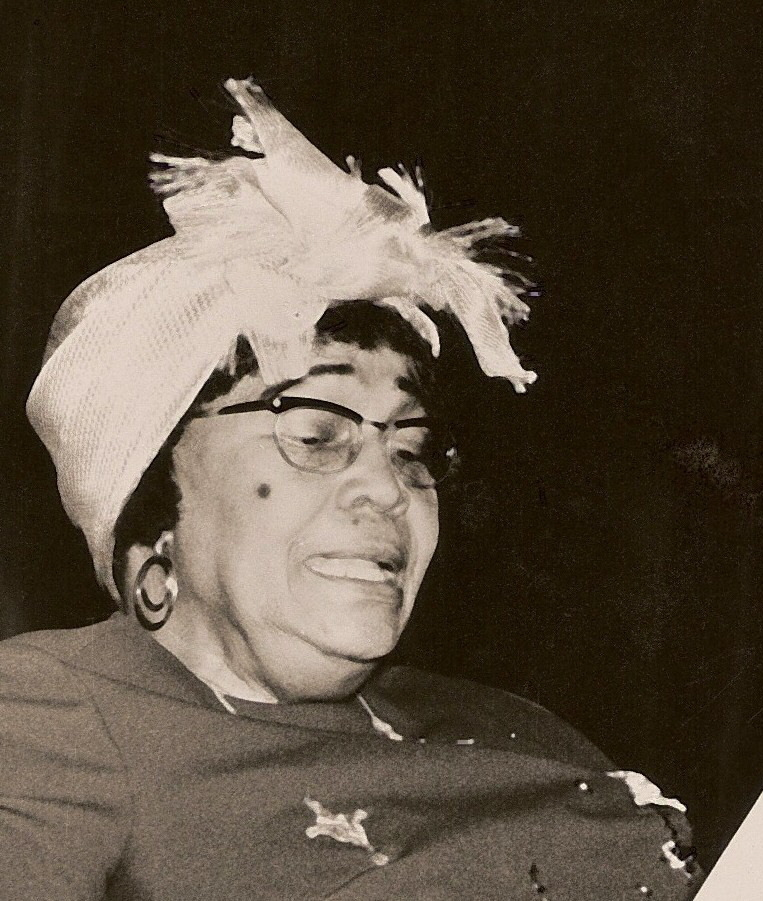
- Born: 11 July 1910; Paramaribo, Suriname
- Died: 23 July 1992 (aged 82); Paramaribo, Suriname

Johanna Schouten-Elsenhout (11 July 1910 – 23 July 1992) was a Surinamese poet and an eminent community leader who fought for acknowledgement of Sranan and of the Afro-Surinamese culture.

== Life ==
Schouten-Elsenhout was born in Paramaribo in 1910. She started writing in the notebooks. She is known for poetry that is written without verses. The poems are written in Sranan Tongo and they contain no punctuation. These love poems include lesbian love which is not taboo in the Afro-creole culture. It is said that she had been composing and writing down proverbial phrases for a long time before she and others recognised that she was composing poetry. She has been called the Grandma Moses of Sranan by Hugo Pos.

In 1987 she was awarded the Knight of the Order of the Yellow Star.

Erwin de Vries, the Surinam sculptor in Paramaribo, made a bronze bust commissioned by the National Women's Movement, de Nationale Vrouwen Beweging (NVB) for the commemoration of the poet's one hundredth birthday.

== Work ==
In 1963 Johanna published her first poetry book called Tide ete (Done Today/ Vandaag nog). In 1965 her second book was published: Awese (Healing Spirit). An Awese is a healing spirit in Winti, the Afro-Surinam religion. Both books are "milestones in the emancipation of the language and culture of the Creole peoples of Surinam and of the Surinam Women's Rights movement." In 2010 a reprint was published to commemorate her one hundredth birthday with translations by D. France Oliveira.

About the creole language Sranantongo Johanna Schouten-Elsenhout said; "Your language is your culture and that is the most precious possession of a human being. If you have lost it, then you have lost your life force, your kra. Your kra is your own personality. You may be poor, but you have a precious spirit that holds you up." One of Schouten-Elsenhout's most famous poem is Uma (Woman) of which the first lines are:

Noti no hei so

Lek’ a sten

D’ e bari

In’ dyugudyugu f’ a dei

(Uma/Woman) "Nothing is so glorious/ As a voice/ That calls out/ In the chaos of a day." According to Oerdigitaalvrouwenblad, a Dutch literary publication (Feminist, anti-racist), Hillary Clinton read this poem in 1999 at the UNESCO Conference in The Hague, The Netherlands.
