= Tamarin, Suriname =

Tamarin
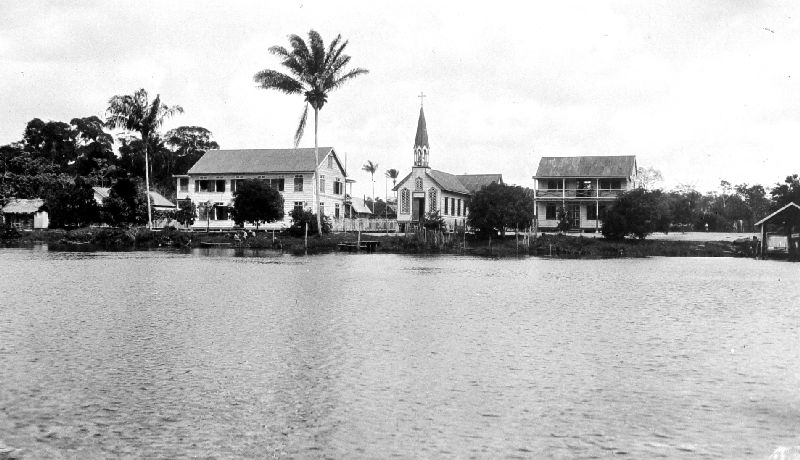
- Panorama of Tamarin (1943)

- Location in Suriname
- Coordinates: 5°46′19″N 54°23′4″W
- Country: Suriname
- District: Marowijne District
- Resort (municipality): Wanhatti

Population (2014)
  - Total: 36

Tamarin is a Ndyuka Maroon village on the Cottica River in Suriname. Tamarin was the place of the Catholic mission on the Cottica River, which operated a church, a boarding school, a clinic, and a sawmill. The mission was deserted during the Surinamese Interior War. Only the school is still in operation today.

Since 2011, there has been a road connecting Tamarin to the East-West Link, via the laterite road that had already connected Wanhatti since 1972.
