= Gazon Matodya =

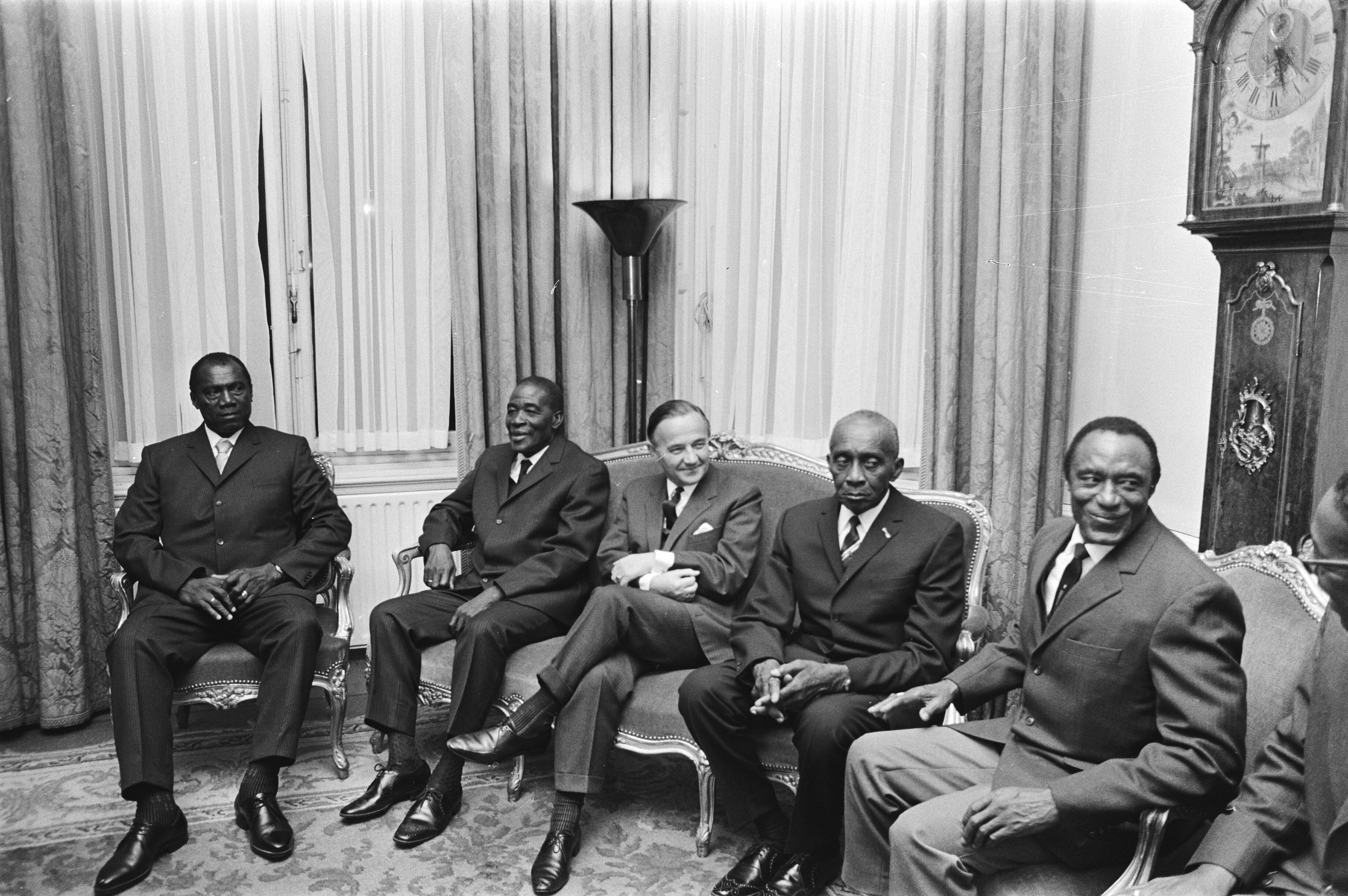
- Gazon Matodya (far right) with Dutch Prime Minister Piet de Jong and the other Surinamese granman

Gaanman of the Ndyuka nation
- Reign: 1965 – 2011
- Predecessor: Akontu Velanti
- Successor: Bono Velanti
- Born: ca. 1920; Moitaki, Sipaliwini District, Suriname
- Died: 1 December 2011; Paramaribo, Suriname
- Burial: 10 April 2012; Diitabiki, Sipaliwini District, Suriname
- House: Baaka bee of Otoo lo

Gazon Matodya (c. 1920 – 1 December 2011) was gaanman of the Okanisi or Ndyuka people of Suriname, South America, one of six Maroon peoples in the area. He lived in Diitabiki (Drietabbetje), a village located on the Tapanahony River. Gaanman Gazon belonged to the Otoo Lo clan, from which most of the Aukan chiefs have come. He was one of the longest-living chiefs to date.

In a statement made in 1992 while in the United States, Gazon said he was not happy with the changes that have occurred in his tribal area during the modern era of the late 20th century. This includes how disputes are settled. In 2007 the six Maroon tribes won a major land rights case initiated in the early 1990s, by which they gained collective control of territories (including mineral resources), which they have occupied since the late 18th century.

== Legacy and honors ==
- In 2000, Gazon was awarded the Grand Cordon in the Honorary Order of the Yellow Star, a Surinamese presidential award.
- He was given a Chubb Fellowship by Yale University.
- In 1996, the Netherlands-based Maroon Institute Sabanapeti established an award named in honor of Gazon. It is intended to acknowledge exceptional people and organizations.
