= Johannes Alabi =

- Born: circa 1743; Munyawoyokiiki, Boven Suriname, Suriname
- Died: 1820
- Occupation: granman

Johannes Alabi (also Arabi)(c. 1743–1820) was granman of the Saramaccans, a Maroon people in Suriname. He was of Yoruba West African descent.

Alabi was born around 1743 in Munyawoyokiiki in Boven Suriname. His father would later become granman (paramount chief) of the tribe. In 1767 his father was killed by the Matawai, and he swore to revenge his father's death. In September 1767, elders of the tribe persuaded to bury the hatchet, because he could become the next granman. He came into contact with missionaries of the Moravian Church who taught him to read and write, and he aided them with the development of a Saramaccan-German dictionary. On 6 January 1771, he was christened. In 1783, he was elected granman of his tribe. He died in 1820.
