= Bono Velanti =

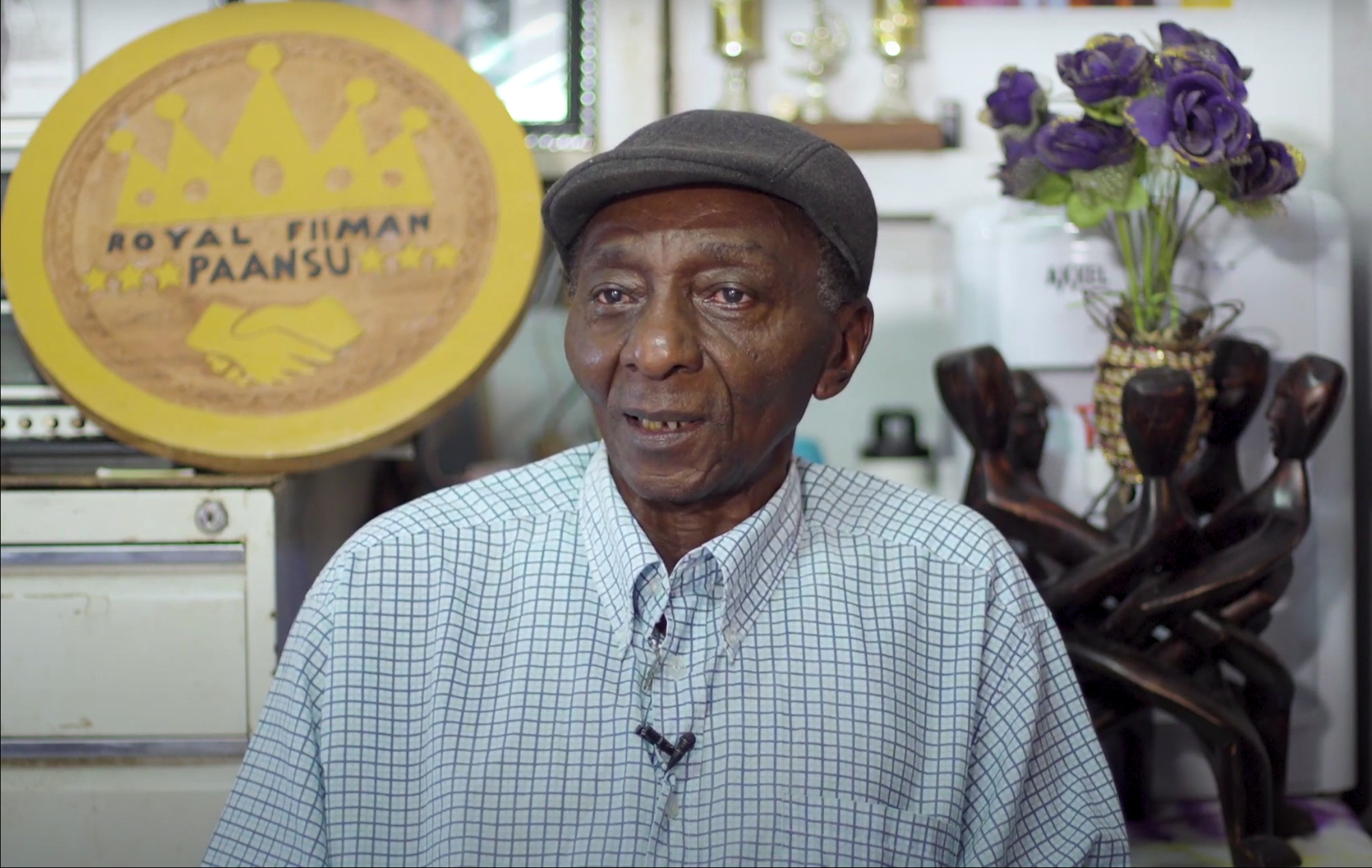
- Velanti in March 2020

Gaanman of the Ndyuka nation
- Reign: 2015 – Present
- Predecessor: Gazon Matodya
- Born: 3 August 1945 (age 80); Diitabiki, Suriname
- Spouse: Bow Atanso
- House: Baaka bee of Otoo lo

Bono Velanti (3 August 1945) is the current Gaanman of the Ndyuka nation of Suriname. Bono Velanti was elected to succeed the late Gazon Matodya as Gaanman in 2015 and was subsequently sworn in by President Desi Bouterse of Suriname on 3 February 2016.
