= Granman =

Paramount chiefs of Maroon nations in Suriname

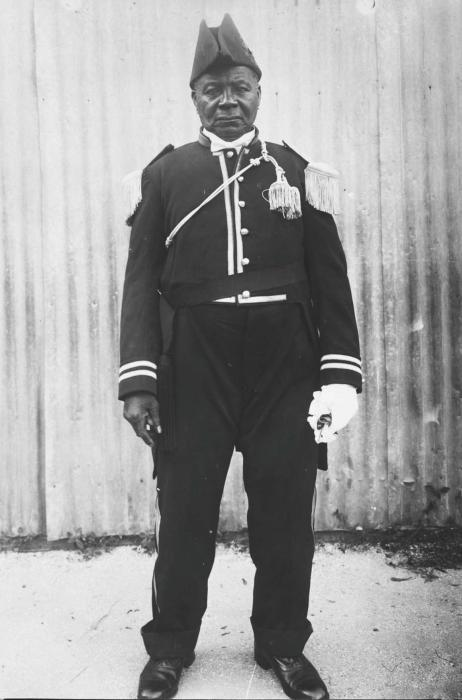
Granman Atudendu of the Saramaka Maroons (1934–1949).

Granman (Eastern Maroon Creole: gaanman) is the title of the paramount chief of a Maroon nation in Suriname and French Guiana. The Ndyuka, Saramaka, Matawai, Aluku, Paramaka and Kwinti nations all have a granman. The paramount chiefs of Amerindian peoples in Suriname are nowadays also often called “granman”.

The word comes from the Sranan Tongo language, a creole spoken in Suriname, and is derived from grand + man meaning "most important man." Granman was also used for the governors of Suriname. The word can be used in combination with other words: granman-oso (big man house) is the Presidential Palace.

== Government ==
The paramount chief of a tribe is the granman. Below the granman are the kabitens (captains) followed by the basiyas (aldermen). The stam lanti consists of all the kabitens and basiyas who meet at least once a year under the authority of the granman and decide the policy for the entire tribe.

A village has a lo lanti (council) consisting of the kabitens and basiyas of the village who are advised by a council of elders. The lo lanti acts as the local government. In case of important decisions, the whole village participates (krutu) and a decision is taken on the basis of consensus.

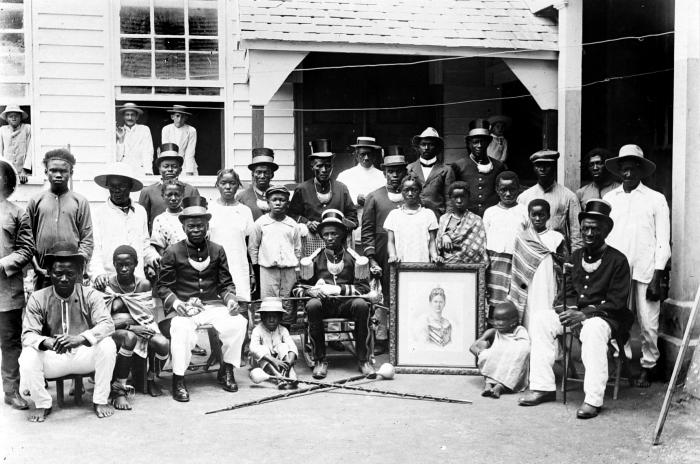
Granman Amakiti with his kabitens in Paramaribo (c. 1923)

Government is based on unwritten rules and regulations called gwenti which are not all powerful. If decision cannot be reached, a lanti krutu (general meeting) is called consisting of the village elite and the priests. The meeting is chaired by the granman who does not speak directly to the people, but always via a momboor who speaks on his behalf. The granman may not be addressed directly either. All villagers are allowed to participate regardless of age or gender, however the elderly carry the highest weight.

Once a year, the granman and his kabitens have to present themselves at the Government in Paramaribo.

== Succession ==
The granman is normally chosen from the same lo (maternal group) and therefore a son can never succeed his father. The successor is chosen from the cousins on the maternal side. The succession is a lengthy process. More than a year must pass before the rituals and ceremonies are performed, and a successor is chosen by the people.

Basiyas and kabitens were normally chosen by the tribe, however political appointments have increased in frequency. The issue has caused diplomatic rifts in the past. In Augustus 1965, before the independence of Suriname, Prime-minister Pengel travelled to Diitabiki to install Gazon Matodya as the new granman, because Gazon was the most likely candidate, and Akontu Velanti had died one year ago. The visit was not appreciated, because the Ndyuka had to choose their own leader, and it was still too early to make a decision. Gazon was also of the opinion that the inauguration ought to be performed by Governor de Vries on behalf of Queen Juliana.

== The six Maroon granman ==
=== Ndyuka granman ===
The Ndyuka granman is elected from the Otoo matriclan or lo and resides in Diitabiki. The current granman is Bono Velantie, who was installed on 17 March 2015.

The Ndyuka and Saramaka distinguish not only the lo of a person, but also the bee. Every lo consists of multiple bees, who have arrived from the same plantation or ancestral mother. The bee forms a segment of 50 to 100 people who are joined together with common practices and rules, but who are often spread out over multiple villages.

Granman of the Ndyuka nation
No.	Granman	Lo	Term in office
1	Fabi Labi Beyman	Dikan	1759 – 1764
2	Kwamina Adyubi	Dikan	1764 – 1765
3	Agbato Langaofangi Agaamu	Nyanfai	1765 – 1767
4	Pamu Langabaiba	Otoo	1767 – 1790
5	Toni	Otoo (Lebi bee)	1790 – 1808
6	Bambi Kukudyaku Bonponubontanafe	Otoo (Baaka bee)	1808 – 1819
7	Kwau Toobi	Otoo (Lebi bee)	1820 – 1832
	Pikin Pangaboko a.i.	Misidyan	1832 – 1833
8	Manyan Beeyman	Otoo (Baaka bee)	1833 – 1866
9	Abaan Beeymofu	Otoo (Baaka bee)	1867 – 1882
10	Oseyse	Otoo (Baaka bee)	1884 – 1915
	Yensa Kanape a.i.	Otoo (Baaka bee)	1915 – 1916
11	Papa Amakiti	Otoo (Baaka bee)	1916 – 1929
	Yensa Kanape a.i.	Otoo (Baaka bee)	1929 – 1937
12	Pai Amatodya	Otoo (Baaka bee)	1937 – 1947
	Apianai a.i.	Misidyan (Maasaa bee)	1947 – 1950
13	Akontu Velanti	Otoo (Baaka bee)	1950 – 1964
	Adan Pankuku a.i.	Otoo (Lebi bee)	1964 – 1966
14	Gazon Sokoton Matodya	Otoo (Baaka bee)	1966 – 2011
15	Bono Velanti	Otoo (Baaka bee)	2015 – present

=== Saramaka granman ===
The Saramaka granman resides in Asidonhopo. The succession of granman Belfon Aboikoni, who died in June 2014, has not been decided as of 2020. There are three candidates, but no agreement between the clans. The decision was forwarded to President Dési Bouterse in 2018, however he decided that the clans have to reach a compromise themselves. On 12 August 2018, Albert Aboikoni was appointed Granman, however the appointment is considered controversial.

Granman of the Saramaka nation
No.	Granman	Term in office
1	Abini	1762 – 1767
2	Kwaku Etja	1775 – 1783
3	Johannes Alabi	1783 – 1820
4	Gbagidi Gbago	1821 (died before inauguration)
5	Gbosuma (Kofi Bosuman)	1822 – 1835
6	Abraham Wetiwojo	1835 – 1867
7	Frans Bona (Faansibona)	1870 – 1886
8	Akoosu	1888 – 1897
9	Djankuso	1889 – 1932
10	Atudendu (Binootu)	1934 – 1949
11	Agbago Aboikoni	1951 – 1989
12	Songo	1991 – 2003
13	Belfon Aboikoni	2005 – 2014
14	Albert Aboikoni	2018 – present

=== Matawai granman ===
The Matawai granman resides in Pusugrunu. The current granman is Lesley Valentijn.

Granman of the Matawai nation
No.	Granman	Term in office
1	Musinga	1760 – 1778
2	Beku	1778 – 1788
3	Bojo	1788 – 1810
4	Kojo	1810 – 1830
5	Afiti Jongman	1830 – 1853
6	Josua Kalkun	1853 – 1867
7	Noah Adrai Vroomhart	1870 – 1893
8	Johannes King	1895 – 1896
9	Lavanti Agubaka	1898 – 1901
10	Matili	1905 – 1908
11	Koso	1913 – 1918 (not installed)
12	Asaf Kine	1926 – 1947
13	Alfred Johan Aboné	1950 – 1980
14	Oscar Charles Lafanti	1981 – 2009
15	Lesley Valentijn	2011 – present

=== Aluku granman ===
The Aluku granman used to reside in Papaïchton. In 1992, there were two granman installed, Paul Doudou who was granman in Papaïchton until his death in 2014, and Joachim-Joseph Adochini who was chosen by election, and not part of maternal lineage. Adochini resides in Maripasoula.

Unlike the other tribes who are located in Suriname, the Aluku are French citizens. There is a village of located in Suriname called Cottica which is governed by a kabiten who is not under the authority of the granman.

The granman of the Aluku is not only a generic tribal chief, but also an arbiter who decides on issues concerning different maternal lineages. No appeal is possible, once a decision has been reached. In practice, his power is limited, because every individual has the right to make their own decisions.

Granman of the Aluku nation
No.	Granman	Term in office	Comment
1	Asikan Silvester	unknown – 1765	
2	Aluku	1765 – 1792	Leader in charge of women and children.
2	Bokilifu Boni	1765 – 1793	Leader in charge of the military command.
3	Agosu	1793 – 1810	
4	Gongo	1810 – 1841	Illegally installed as granman by Le Prieux who had no authority.
5	Adam (Labi)	1841 – 1870	
6	Atyaba	1870 – 1876	
7	Anato	1876 – 1891	
8	Ochi	1891 – 1915	First granman to be recognised by the French Government.
9	Awensai	1917 – 1936	
10	Difu	1937 – 1965	
11	Tolinga	1967 – 1990	
12a	Paul Doudou	1992 – 2014	Residence in Papaïchton
12b	Joachim-Joseph Adochini	1992 – present	Chosen by an election and not part of the maternal lineage. Residence in Maripasoula

=== Paramaka granman ===
The Paramaka granman resides in Langatabiki. The current granman is Jozef Misajere Forster.

Granman of the Paramaka nation
No.	Granman	Term in office	Comment
1	Papa Doffin		
2	Tata Bigiman		
3	Tata Aboma		
4	Frans Kwakoe		
	Asaisi, Akama, Amerikan and Apensa		Interim period with four leaders; Asaisi who was next in line refused the position, which was then given to Apensa as the oldest of the four
5	Kwaku Petrus Apensa	1898 – 1923	First Pamaka granman officially recognised by the Government
6	Jozef Aboenawooko	1932 – 1947	
7	Cornelis Zacharia Forster	1951 – 1991	
8	Jan Levi	1993 – 2008	
9	Samuel Forster	2010 – 2017	
10	Jozef Misajere Forster	2020 – present	

=== Kwinti granman ===
The Kwinti granman resides in Witagron. Granman André Mathias died in 2018.

Granman of the Kwinti nation
No.	Granman	Term in office	Comment
1	Boku	unknown – 1765	
2	Kofi	unknown – 1827	
3	Alamun	1887 – unknown	Officially appointed, but not as granman and only the tribe living on the Coppename River
4	Marcus Mentor	1913 – 1926	
5	Paulus Paka	1928 – 1936	
6	Johannes Afiti	1937 – 1977	
7	Matheus Cornelis Marcus	1978 – 1999	
8	André Mathias	2002 – 2018	First to rule as granman
9	Remon Clemens	2020	

=== Brooskampers kabiten ===
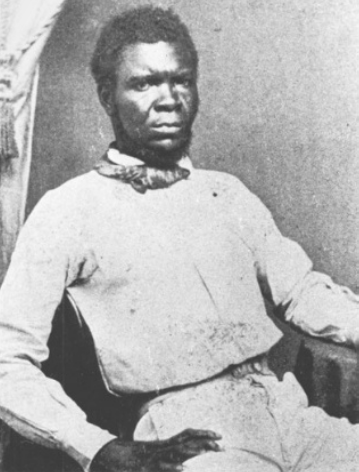
Kabiten Broos (~1870)

There was a seventh group of Maroons called Brooskampers (also: Bakabusi Nengre). In the 1740s, they lived in the swamps near Surnau Creek. On 2 September 1863, a peace treaty was signed offering the tribe the abandoned plantations Klaverblad and Rorac. No granman was appointed, and the tribe was led by a kabiten (captain). Bauxite was discovered on the plantation. In 1917, a deal was negotiated with the tribe by kabiten Hudukanti and Alcoa, the lands were sold, and the people settled in Tout-Lui-Faut near Paramaribo.

Kabitens of the Brooskamper nation
No.	Kabiten	Term in office	Comment
1	Kukudabi	18th century	Founder of tribe.
2	Tata Sambo	unknown – 1830	Taken from Rac à Rac by Kukudabi.
3	April	mid 19th century	
4	Broos (Brosu) & Kaliko	around 1860 – 1880	Grandchildren of Tata Sambo. First recognised kabitens
5	Hudukanti (Johannes Babel)	1880 – 1917	Son of Broos. Last kabiten of the Brooskampers.

== The indigenous granman ==
=== Tiriyó granman ===
Traditionally, there was no clear hierarchy in the Tiriyó tribe. In 1997, Asongo Alalaparu was appointed as first granman for Suriname.

Granman of the Tiriyó
Granman	Country	Term in office
Asongo Alalaparu	Suriname	1997 – 2021
Jimmy Toeroemang	Suriname	2022 – Present

=== Wayana granman ===
Granman of the Wayana in Suriname
Granman	Term in office
Kananoe Apetina	1952 – 1975
Aptuk Noewahe	1976 – Present

Head captain of the Wayana on the Lawa River
Granman	Term in office
Janomalë	1938 – 1958
Anapaikë	1958 – 2003
Ipomadi Pelenapïn	2005 – Present

Granman of the Wayana in French Guiana
Granman	Term in office
Twenkë	1960 – 1985
Amaipotï	1985 – Present

Traditionally, the Wayana did not recognise a form of leadership that transcended the village level. Contact with missionaries and state representatives started to change that, and the Surinamese, French, and Brazilian states preferred to centralise their dealings with the Wayana, and for this purpose installed captains, head captains and granman among the Wayana chief. As the concept of a paramount chief goes against Wayana ideas of political organisation, the authority of these chiefs beyond their own villages is often limited.

The granman of the Wayana in Suriname resides in Pïlëuwimë, which is also known as Apetina, after the name of the first granman Kananoe Apetina, who was recognised by governor Jan Klaasesz as granman of the Wayana in 1952.

Apart from the granman in Pïlëuwimë, the Wayana on the Surinamese side of the Lawa River have their own head captain residing in Kawemhakan, who is also often referred to as granman.

The granman of the Wayana in French Guiana resides in Kulumuli, which is also known by the name of the first granman Twenkë. After Twenkë's he was succeeded by his son Amaipotï.
