= André Pakosie =

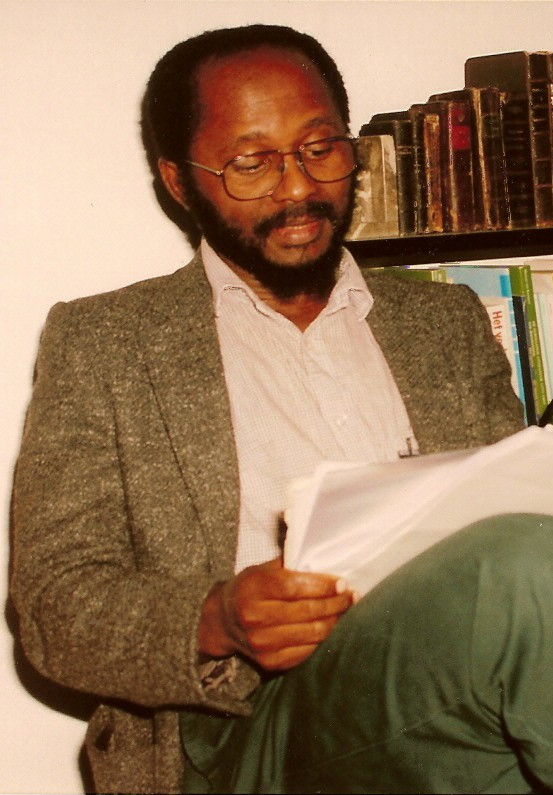
- Born: André Richard Matiematie Pakosie; 25 May 1955 (age 71); Diitabiki, Tapanahony, Suriname
- Occupations: activist, writer, historian

André R.M. Pakosie (born 25 May 1955) is a Surinamese historian, poet, Ndyuka activist and Edebukuman (head of experts) of the Afaka script.

Pakosie comes from a family of herbal doctors and is himself a phytotherapist in the Surinamese Maroon tradition. He founded the Sabanapeti health center and the Maroon Institute Sabanapeti Foundation. In the 1980s he had to leave Suriname because of the Suriname Guerrilla War and settled in the Netherlands. He has received honors from the Queen of the Netherlands and the President of Suriname. He was the founder of "Maroon Day", celebrating the Maroon struggle for freedom. In his teens he rejected Christianity as he felt it hostile to pre-Christian traditions. In addition to being a herbalist and activist he is also a poet and historian. He is noted for his writing concerning the Maroon peoples.

André Pakosie has written more than 30 books as of 1972, in the following languages: Dutch, Sranan Tongo and the Ndyuka or Okanisi language. The books are mainly about the history of Suriname and culture of the Maroons. The Ndyuka mainly have an oral tradition, and to encourage the development of writing, Pakosie had founded in 1974 the National Institute to Combat Illiteracy in Suriname, of which he had been the director. Pakosie is editor-in-chief of the Marron magazine Siboga in which he has published extensively. He has also published among others in the Weekkrant Suriname, Trouw., Volksnieuws, De Gids, Journal of Legal Pluralism and Unofficial Law (University of Birmingham, England) and New West Indian Guide/Nieuwe West-Indische Gids. As Edebukuman of the Afáka syllabary, he is working to systematize that script.

In 2015 Pakosie was sentenced to 6 years in prison and fined €10,000 for years of incest with his teenage daughter and the production of child pornography. The victim's mother and stepmother were sentenced to 3 years for complicity; her step-sister was given a probationary sentence due to herself being a victim of her father.
