= Belfon Aboikoni =

Gaanman of the Saramaka people
- Reign: 2005 – 2014
- Predecessor: Songo
- Successor: Albert Aboikoni
- Born: 31 January 1938; Dangogo, Boven Suriname, Surinam
- Died: 24 June 2014 (aged 76); Paramaribo, Suriname

Belfon Aboikoni (31 January 1938 – 24 June 2014) was granman of the Saramaka maroons in Suriname. Aboikoni was sworn in as chief of the Saramaka, one of Suriname's Maroon peoples, in October 2005 at the age of 65. He succeeded the late chief Songo Aboikoni who died two years earlier. Belfon Aboikoni focused on land rights during his time as chief.

== Biography ==
Aboikoni was born on 01 February 1939 in Dangogo. Aboikoni was well-disposed to the Netherlands and had portraits of Dutch Queens in his residence.

His appointment as granman was accomplished by the government, which was contrary to the tradition of the Saramaka community. The appointment therefore led to disagreement and degenerated in March 2006 in his abduction for a few days by his own family members. Aboikoni remained in Paramaribo for some time, even when the floods of May 2006 hit his home area. In response, he indicated that he was best placed to defend his people from the capital

Chief Belfon Aboikoni died on 24 June 2014, at the age of 76. He had suffered from diabetes and declining health.

Later, after his death, he was praised for the role he had played in the Saramaka judgement.
