= Patamacca =

Coordinates: 5.423°N 54.502°W

- Resort
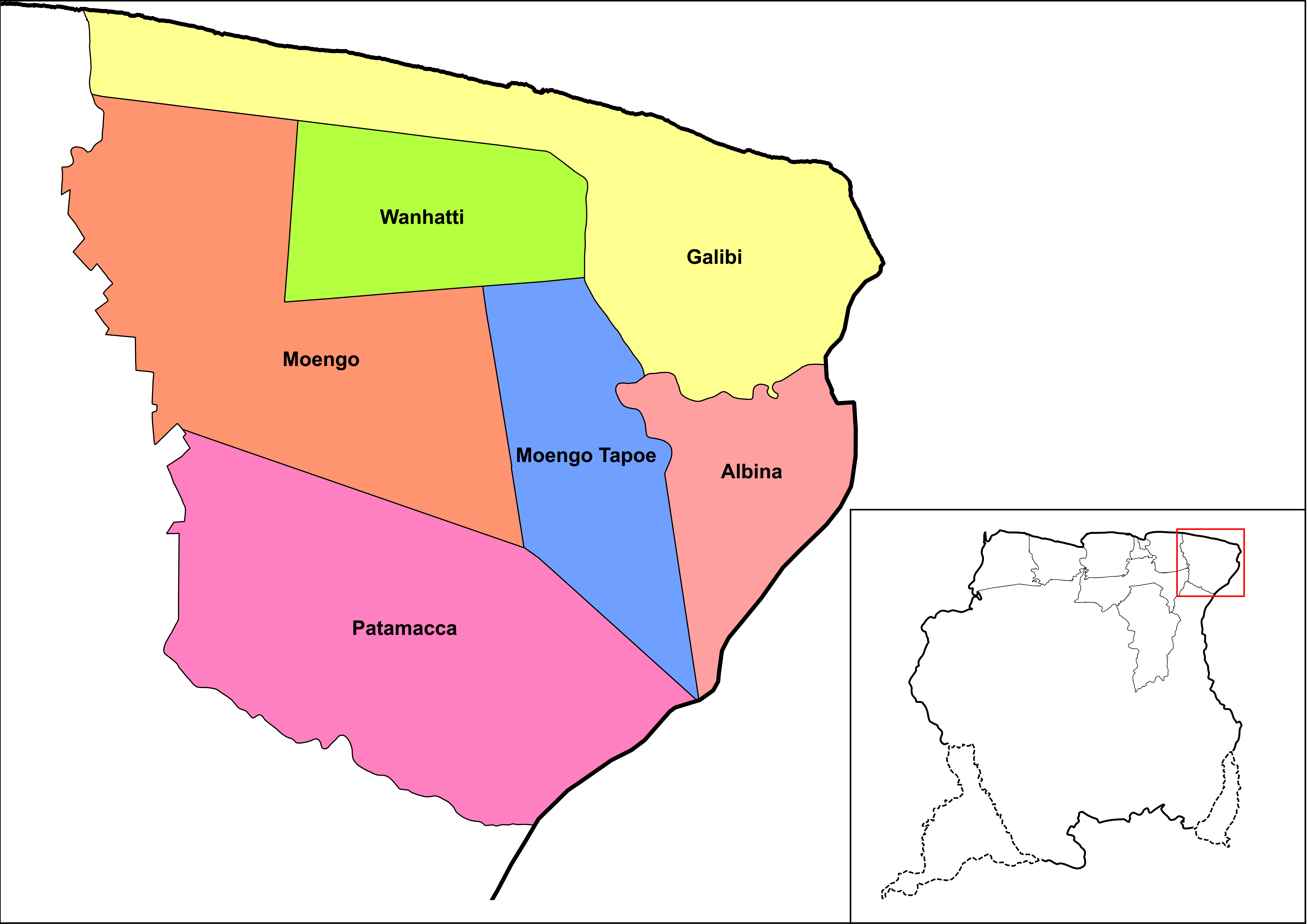
- Map showing the resorts of Marowijne District. Patamacca
- Country: Suriname
- District: Marowijne District

Area
  - Total: 1,183 km^{2} (457 sq mi)

Population (2012)
  - Total: 427
  - Density: 0.361/km^{2} (0.935/sq mi)
- Time zone: UTC-3 (AST)

Patamacca is a resort in Suriname, located in the Marowijne District. Its population at the 2012 census was 427. Patamacca is a tribal area inhabited by Maroons

In 1773, attempts were made to conquer the Patamacca territory by the Society of Suriname, but did not yield results, and the area was left in the hands of the Maroons.

The main economic activity in the Patamacca area was the palm oil industry, During the 1960s Bruynzeel started a large-scale wood plantation in the resort. There is a large granite mine in the resort which is operated by Grassalco. Even though Patamacca did not bear much destruction during the Surinamese Interior War, the civil war did result in refugees, and stopped much of the industry. As of 2019, attempts have been made to restart the palm oil industry with Chinese aid.

The village of Ovia Olo is located in the resort.
