= Boni (guerrilla leader) =

Guerrilla leader of Suriname (c. 1730 – 1793)

- Bokilifu Boni
- Born: c. 1730; Cottica River, Moengo, Suriname
- Died: 19 February 1793 (aged 62–63); Akuba Booko Goo, Maripasoula, French Guiana
- Occupations: Freedom fighter, guerrilla leader

Bokilifu Boni (usually just Boni) (c. 1730 – 19 February 1793) was a freedom fighter and guerrilla leader in Suriname, when it was under Dutch colonial rule. Born in Cottica to an enslaved African mother who escaped from her Dutch master, he grew up with her among the Maroons in the forest. He was such a powerful leader that his followers were known as Boni's people after him (they later became known as the Aluku). They built a fort in the lowlands and conducted raids against Dutch plantations along the coast. Under pressure from Dutch regular army and hundreds of freedmen, they went east across the river into French Guiana. Boni continued to conduct raids from there, but was ultimately killed in warfare.

== Biography ==
According to legend, Boni was born into slavery as the mixed-race son of a Dutchman and an enslaved African woman. While pregnant, she fled into the forest, to the Cottica-Maroons. There, Boni was born about 1730. He learned hunting and fishing skills from elders in the community. The tribe in which Boni was born initially lived along the Cottica River in what is nowadays the Moengo resort in Suriname.

In 1760, the Ndyuka people who lived nearby, signed a peace treaty with the colonists offering them territorial autonomy. In 1765, Boni succeeded Asikan Sylvester as the leader of his tribe. Boni also desired a peace treaty, however the Society of Suriname, started a war against him. The Society had considered negotiations a sign of weakness. Also the tribe numbered about 200 people, while the Ndyuka consisted of 2,000 people. Lichtveld pointed to the Berbice slave uprising as a possible reason for the change of policy. Regardless of the motivation, in 1768, the first village was discovered and destroyed.

In 1770, two other Maroon groups joined the tribe which became known as the "Boni's" (later: Aluku) after their leader. He trained his people to be formidable enemies of the colonists. Well-known fellow warriors were Baron and Joli-coeur.

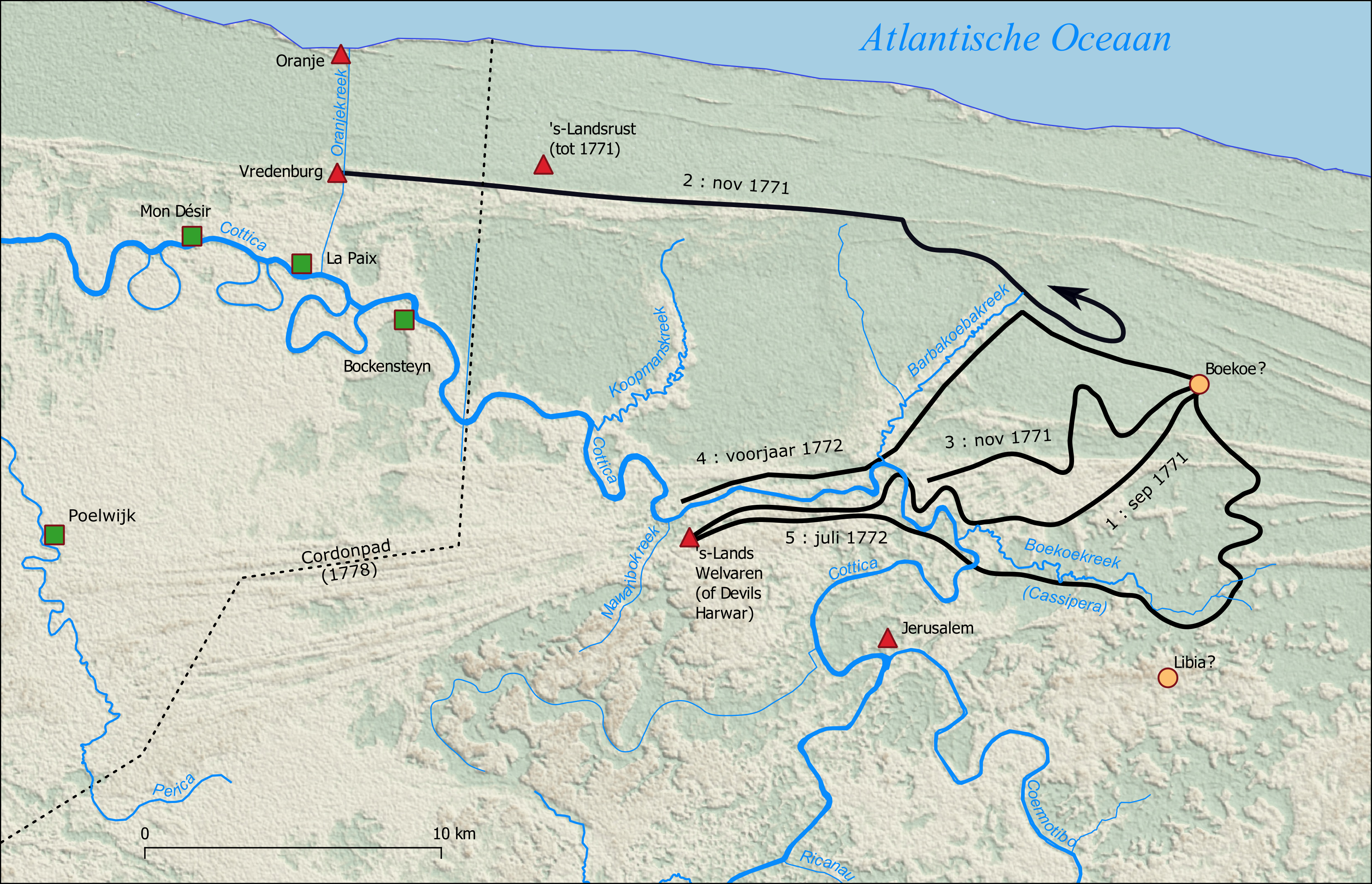
Expeditions to Fort Boekoe in 1771 and 72

Boni and his warriors operated from a large fortress with a four-meter-high wall, which they called Fort Boekoe. It was located in the wetlands of the coastal region of Commewijne, and named after the Boekoe Creek. The wetlands provided strategic defences, and they armed the garrison with rifles and a cannon.

It was nearly impossible for the Dutch militia to trace or reach. From this strong position, the Boni's conducted numerous raids on plantations in the east of Suriname, especially in the area of the Cottica River. During these raids, they took provisions, tools, weapons and women. Because of the many successes of Boni and his troops, some slaves tried to escape and join him.

For the planters, the loss of slaves meant a considerable loss of capital. Because of the raids and raids that were undertaken from Boekoe, and the money-consuming punitive expeditions that followed, the fortress became a major concern for the colonists. The colony's militia was unable to counter the guerrilla tactics of Boni. The militia was reinforced in 1772 by a corps of Zwarte Jagers (black hunters), recruited from 300 freed slaves and led by European officers. The soldiers were given freedom from slavery and a piece of land, if they enlisted. To distinguish them from Boni's troops, they wore red caps, which earned them the nickname Redi Musus (Dutch orthography: Redi Moesoes).

This corps proved successful: after a campaign of seven months, the secret path, which was just under water and gave access to the fort, was betrayed in 1772. While Captain Mangold made a feint attack, the Jagers attacked the fort through the secret path. The fort was destroyed, but Boni escaped to the east and crossed the Marowijne River, which bordered French Guiana.

He moved his headquarters to Fort Aloekoe, among other places. In February 1773, further reinforcements arrived from the Dutch Republic: a regiment of Marines commanded by Colonel Louis-Henri Fourgeoud. Among the officers was John Gabriel Stedman, who published an account of his experiences. He described, among other things, the tactics of the African guerrillas: how small groups of four or five men, by moving and shooting rapidly, could appear to be part of a much larger group. Knowing the wetlands and territory, Boni and his mobile warriors confused and repeatedly defeated the Europeans and their mercenaries.

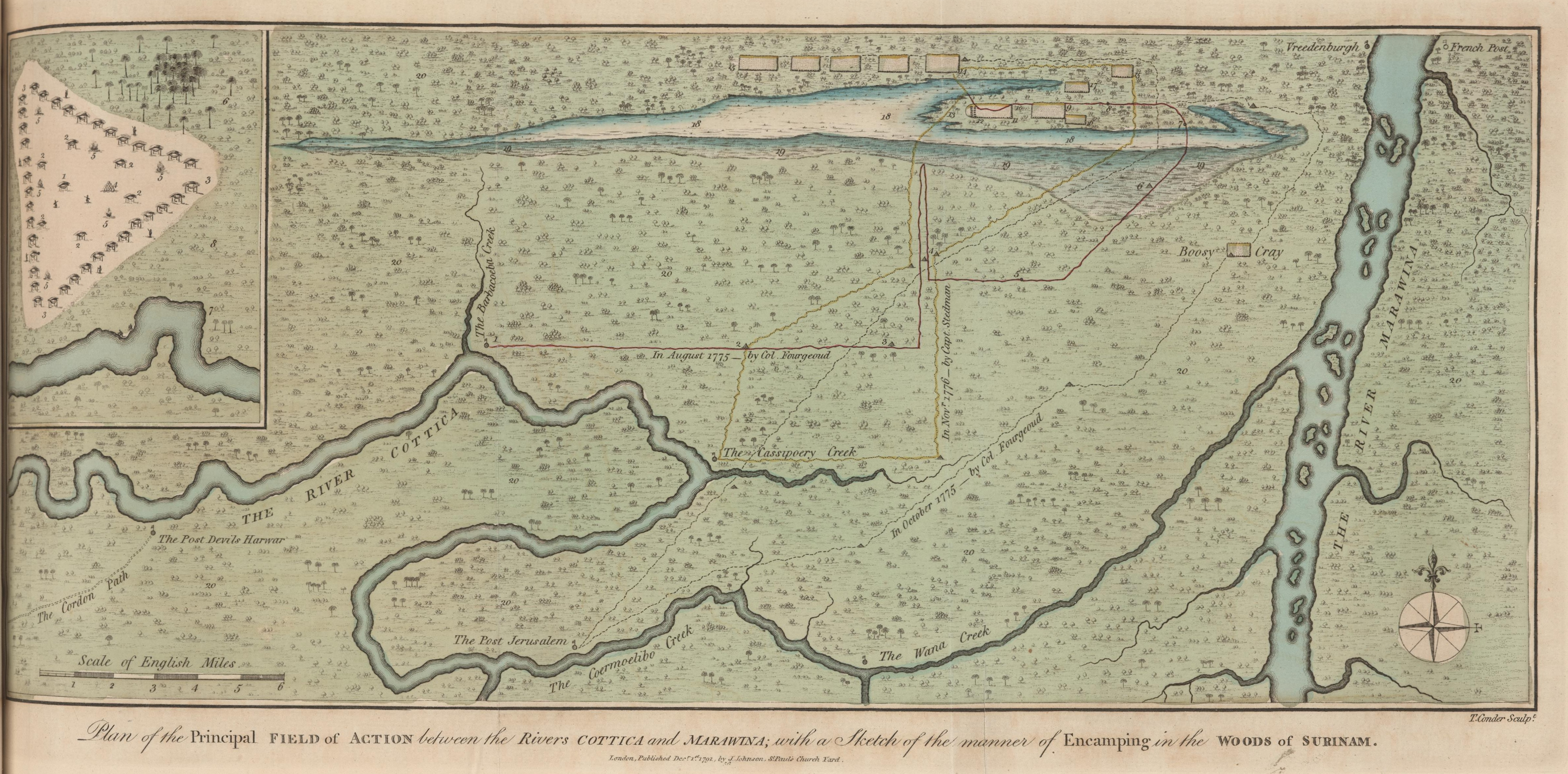
Sketch of the conquest of Boosy Cray by Fourgeoud in 1775-1776

Fourgeoud, who had previously served in Berbice, managed to drive Boni's forces back, although they were never defeated. Eventually, they retreated into French Guiana. The French intendant Pierre Victor Malouet visited Paramaribo in 1777 to discuss with Dutch leaders the issue of the 200 Maroons on French territory.

The remaining Boni's moved southwards, and settled along the Lawa River, a river that formed the border between French Guiana and Suriname. The Ndyuka initially attacked them for encroaching into their territory. In late 1779, after negotiations, a peace treaty was signed between the two tribes. Boni was offered a daughter of the Ndyuka granman as a wife. The treaty worried Paramaribo, however the Ndyuka assured the colonists that Boni had agreed not to attack the plantations, if his people were left alone.

Peace was maintained until 1788 when plantation Clarenbeek was attacked. Five soldiers were killed, and the plantation owner was taken away to serve a slave for the tribe. In 1789, the Ndyukas ended the peace treaty and joined the colonists The next year, Fort Aloekoe was conquered, and the plantation owner was released from slavery. In 1791 Lieutenant colonel Beutler chased the Boni's from Suriname into French Guiana.

On 19 February 1793 Boni had made his camp on a place called Akuba Booko Goo (English: Akuba's Broken Gourd) near rapids with the same name in the Marouini River. 2.5636°N 54.0299°W That night Boni was betrayed, and killed by Bambi, an Ndyuka chief, who was under great pressure from Lieutenant Stoelman, commander of the Redi Musus.

Boni is still a legendary figure among the Suriname community, where the Maroons fought for their rights to independence until 1887 when the Kwinti finally signed a peace treaty.

== Bibliography ==
- Beet, Chris de (1984): De eerste Boni-oorlog 1765-1778. Rijksuniversiteit Utrecht, Centrum voor Caraïbische studies. ISBN 90-70955-11-3
- Buddingh, Hans (1995). Geschiedenis van Suriname (in Dutch). Het Spectrum. ISBN 9027430446.
- Fleury, Marie (2018). "Gaan Mawina, le Marouini (haut Maroni) au cœur de l'histoire des Noirs marrons Boni/Aluku et des Amérindiens Wayana". Revue d'Ethnoécologie. Revue d’ethnoécologie 13, 2018 (in French) (13). doi:10.4000/ethnoecologie.3534. S2CID 165599187.
- Groot, Silvia, de (1970). "Rebellie der Zwarte Jagers. De nasleep van de Bonni-oorlogen 1788-1809". Digital Library of Dutch Literature. De Gids (in Dutch).
- Dobbeleir, Céline (2008). De politieke mobilisatie en organisatie van vijf etnische groepen in Suriname (PDF) (in Dutch). Ghent University. Archived from the original (PDF) on 27 February 2022.
- Hoogbergen, Wim S.M. (1985): The Boni Maroon Wars in Suriname, 1757-1860, Rijksuniversiteit Utrecht, Centrum voor Caraïbische studies. ISBN 90-70955-13-X
- Hoogbergen, Wim (1992): De Bosnegers zijn gekomen! Slavernij en rebellie in Suriname, Prometheus, ISBN 90-5333-101-8
- Hoogbergen, Wim (1992). "Origins of the Suriname Kwinti Maroons". New West Indian Guide / Nieuwe West-Indische Gids. New West Indian Guide / Nieuwe West-Indische Gids 66, no. 1/2. 66 (1–2): 27–59. doi:10.1163/13822373-90002003.
- Rijn, Elly van (2008): Lang gedacht, nooit verwacht, toch gevonden. Fort Boekoe, verzetshaard van de Marrons, in: Parbode, February 2008, vol. 02, no. 22, pp. 36–38.
- Scholtens, Ben (1994). Bosneger and overheid in Suriname (Thesis) (in Dutch). Paramaribo: Radboud University Nijmegen. ISBN 9991410155.
- Stedman, John Gabriel (1796). Narrative of a five years' expedition against the revolted Negroes of Surinam, with engravings by William Blake after drawings. London.
- Stedman, John Gabriel (1799-1800): Reize naar Surinamen en de binnenste gedeelten van Guiana; door den capitain John Gabriël Stedman met plaaten en kaarten. Naar het Engelsch, translated by Johannes Allart, Amsterdam.
- Stedman, John Gabriel (1992): Stedman's Surinam: Life in an Eighteenth-Century Slave Society. An abridged, modernized edition of narrative of a five years expedition against the revolted negroes of Surinam, edited by Richard Price, Sally Price; Baltimore, MD: The Johns Hopkins University Press; Reprint edition, March 1, 1992. ISBN 0801842603

+
