= Marowijne District =

District of Suriname

Marowijne Maawinaliba (Eastern Maroon Creole)
- District
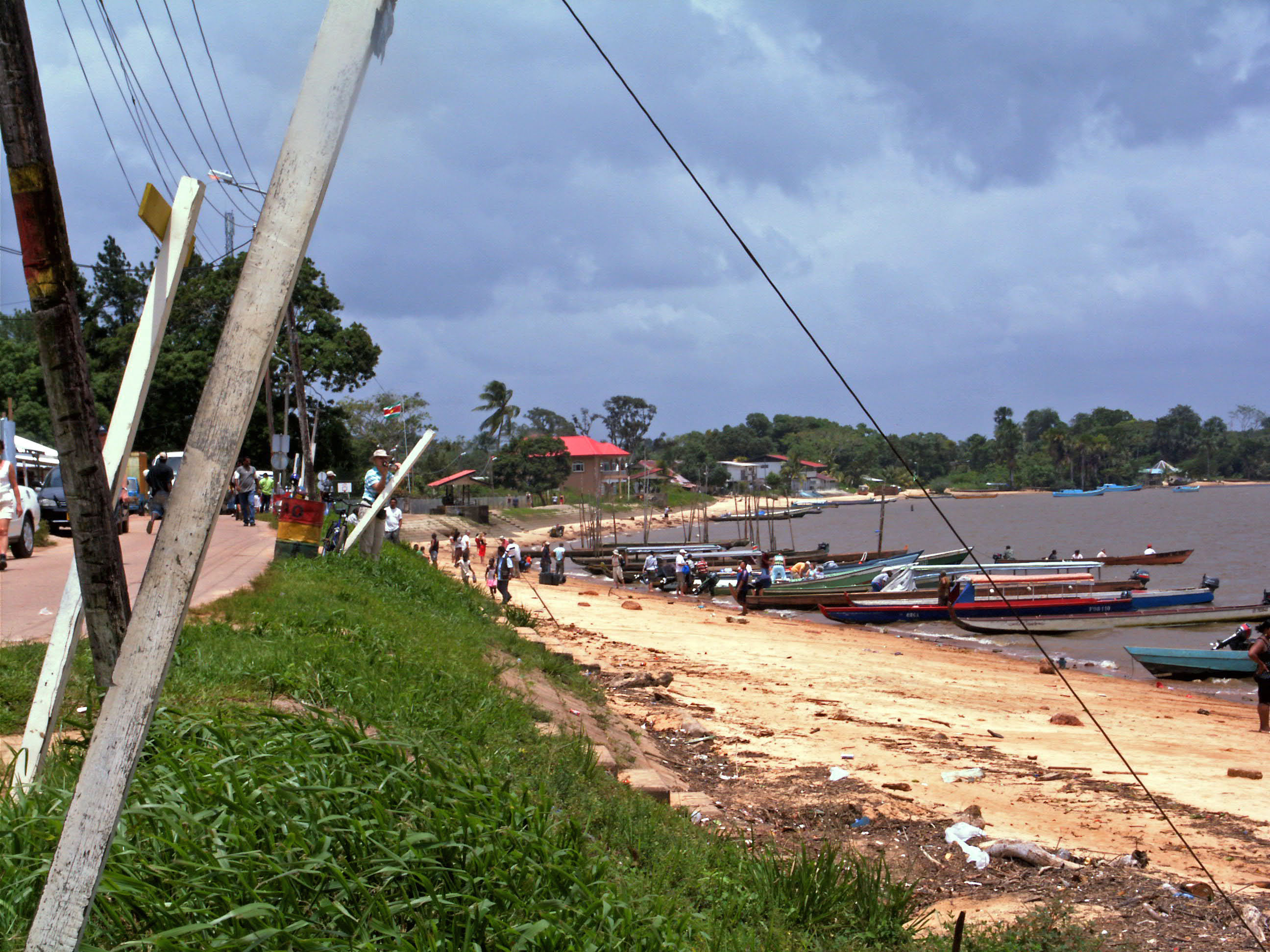
- Boats on the beach in Albina

- Map of Suriname showing Marowijne district
- Coordinates: 5°46′N 56°19′W
- Country: Suriname
- Capital: Albina

Area
  - Total: 4,627 km^{2} (1,786 sq mi)

Population (2012 census)
  - Total: 18,294
  - Density: 3.954/km^{2} (10.24/sq mi)
- Time zone: UTC-3

Marowijne (Dutch: [maːroːˈʋɛinə]; Eastern Maroon Creole: Maawina) is a district of Suriname, located on the north-east coast. Marowijne's capital city is Albina, with other towns including Moengo and Wanhatti. The district borders the Atlantic Ocean to the north, French Guiana to the east, the Surinamese district of Sipaliwini to the south, and the Surinamese districts of Commewijne and Para to the west.

Marowijne's population is 18,294 and the district has an area of 4,627 km^{2}.

== History ==
Marowijne is also home to many Maroon palenques. The Maroons are descendants of slaves who escaped from their Dutch masters centuries ago, particularly slaves who escaped from Suriname's huge plantations during the 18th century. They established autonomy for their interior settlements by a 1760 peace treaty with the Netherlands, which was unable to conquer them.

Albina was founded on 13 December 1845 by August Kappler, and was named after his wife. Albina is located near the border with French Guiana. It is the main city, and the largest area which is not tribal.

During the early 20th century, bauxite was discovered in Marowijne district, leading to a boom in mining that significantly enriched the entire country. The bauxite industry resulted in the growth of Moengo which is as of 2020, the largest town in the district.

On 22 July 1986, the Surinamese Interior War started. That night, the Jungle Commando led by Ronnie Brunswijk, captured the check post near Stolkertsijver, and opened fire on the army barracks in Albina. The civil war which followed led to the massacre of Moiwana where 35 civilians including women and children were killed by the National Army led by Dési Bouterse, and large scale destruction in Albina and Moengo. The civil war also resulted in a refugee crisis into French Guiana.

The district also has a large tourism industry and is the location of ocean front resorts in Galibi, which is inhabited by an indigenous population.

The main road for Marowijne is the East-West Link. The distance between Paramaribo and Albina is about 150 km (95 mi).

== Health care ==
Four health cares centre are located in the District, and there is a regional medical centre in Albina which qualifies as a minor hospital, however specialised health care has to be performed in Paramaribo or French Guiana. In corporation with the French Development Agency and the Inter-American Development Bank a hospital is under construction in Albina.

== Resorts ==
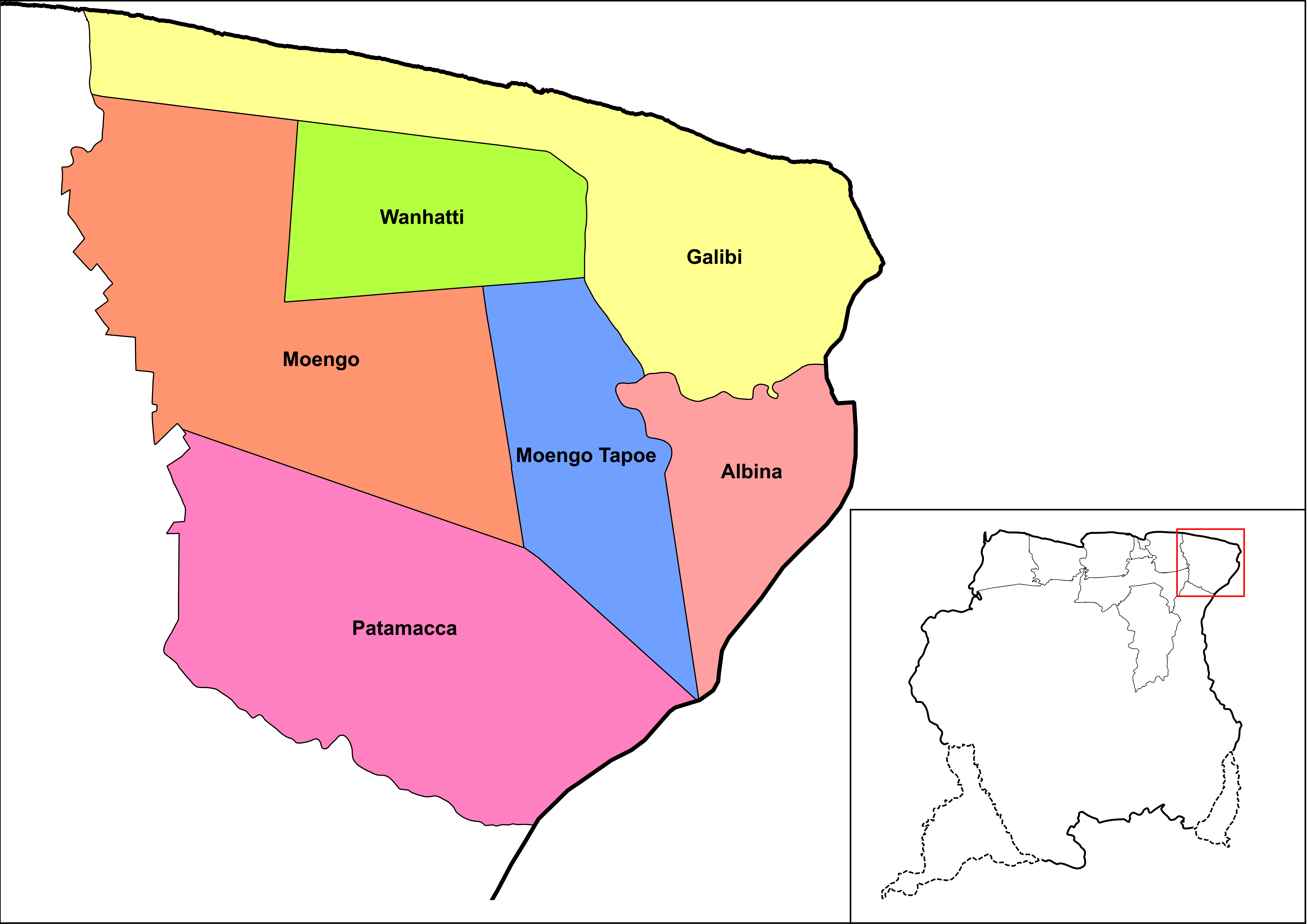
Resorts of Marowijne

Marowijne is divided into six resorts (ressorten):

- Albina (integral part of Suriname)
- Galibi (indigenous area)
- Moengo (Maroon autonomous area)
- Moengotapoe (Maroon autonomous area)
- Patamacca (Maroon autonomous area)
- Wanhatti (Maroon autonomous area)

== Villages ==
- Alfonsdorp
- Bigiston
- Christiaankondre
- Langamankondre
- Lantiwei
- Moiwana
- Ovia Olo
- Pikin Santi
- Pinatjaimi
- Ricanau Mofo
- Tamarin
