= Cottica River =

River in Northeast Suriname

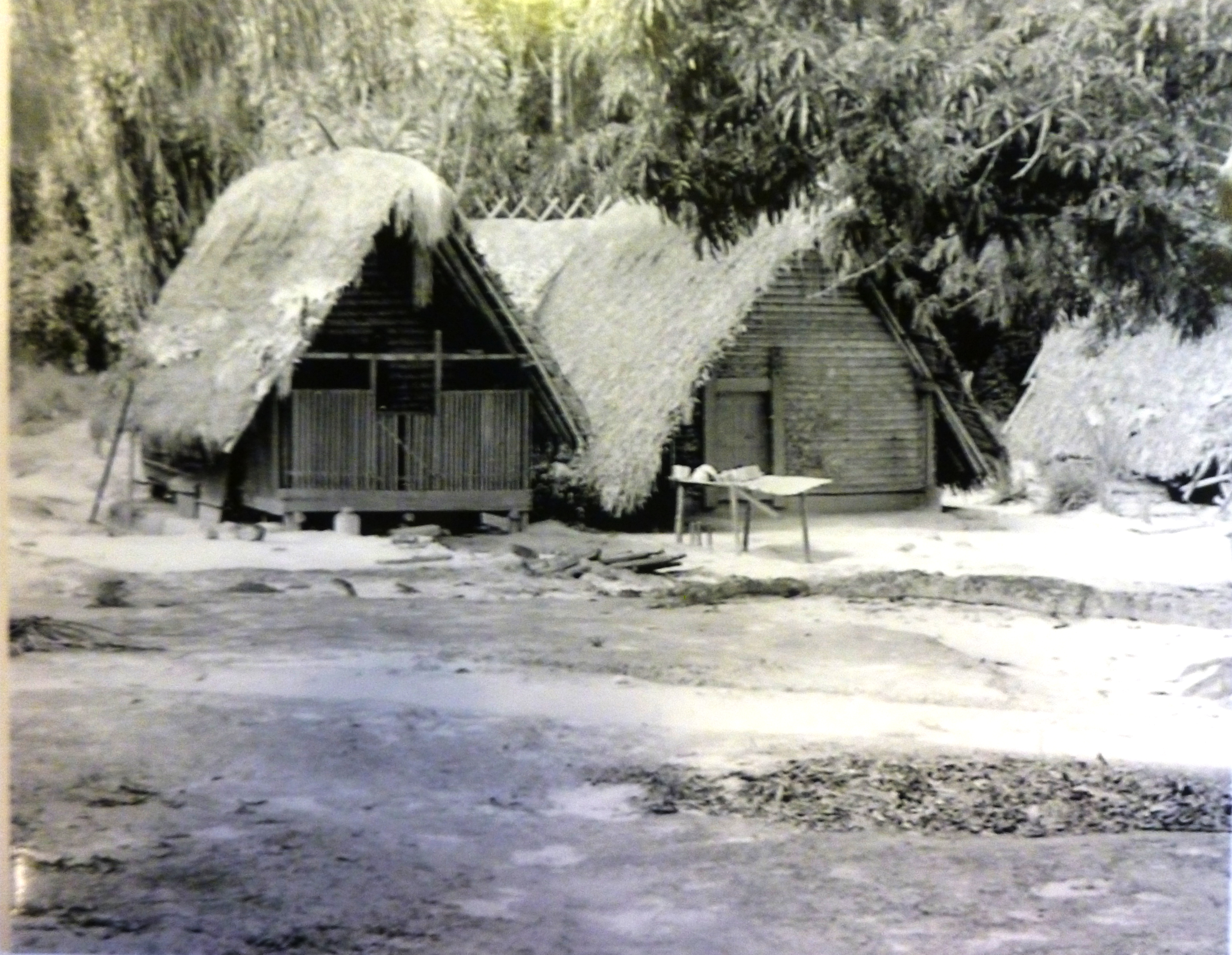
- On the banks of the Cottica River in 1965

- Native name: Kotika-liba (Sranan Tongo)

Location
- Country: Suriname
- District: Marowijne

Physical characteristics
- Source
  - location: Patamacca
  - coordinates: 5.3838°N 54.4711°W
- Mouth: Commewijne River
  - coordinates: 5.866667°N 54.866667°W

Basin features
- Progression: Commewijne River→Atlantic Ocean

Cottica River (Sranan Tongo: Kotika-liba) is a river in the northeast of Suriname.

It originates in the hills surrounding town of Moengo and flows westwards and enters the Commewijne River at Fort Sommelsdijk.

It has a river basin of 2.900 km^{2}.
