= Ndyuka people =

Maroon ethnic group

Ndyuka
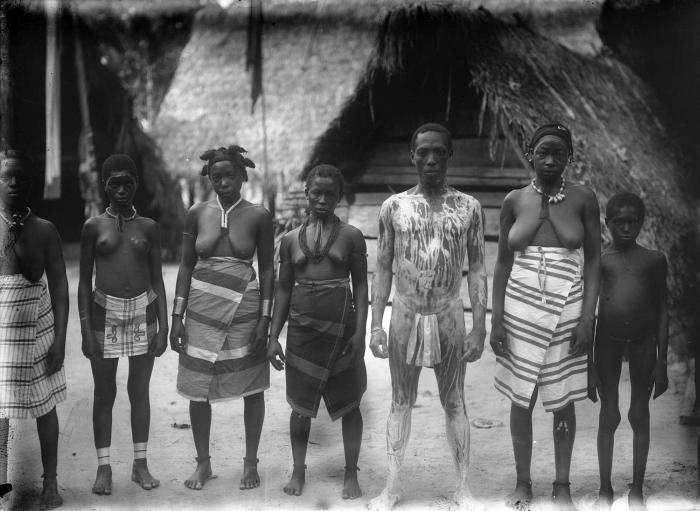

Total population
- 90,000 (2014, est.)

Regions with significant populations
- Marowijne & Tapanahony, Suriname: 26,000
- Paramaribo & suburbs: 30,000
- French Guiana: 26,500
- Netherlands: 7,500

Languages
- Ndyuka, Dutch, French & Sranan Tongo

Religion
- Christianity & Winti

Related ethnic groups
- Akans, Kwinti, Afro-Surinamese and Ghanaian people

Granman of the Ndyuka people
- Incumbent; Bono Velanti since 2015
- Residence: Diitabiki

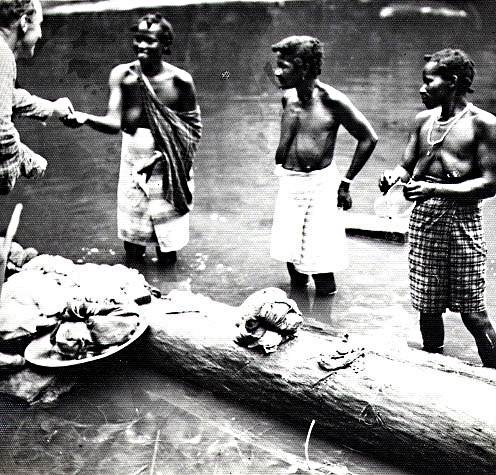
Maroon women carrying out daily chores and socializing, Suriname River, 1955

The Ndyuka people (also spelled Djuka) or Aukan people (Eastern Maroon Creole: Okanisi) are one of six Maroon peoples (formerly called "Bush Negroes", which has pejorative associations) in the Republic of Suriname and one of the Maroon peoples in French Guiana. The Aukan or Ndyuka speak the Ndyuka language. They are subdivided into the Opu, who live upstream of the Tapanahony River in the Tapanahony resort of southeastern Suriname, and the Bilo, who live downstream of that river in Marowijne District.

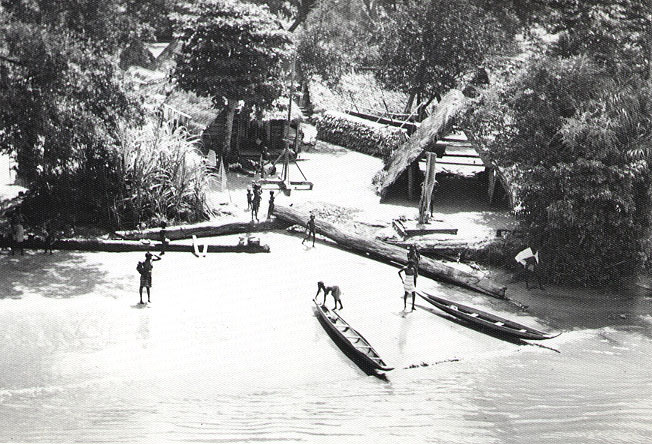
Dugout canoes at Ndyuka Maroon village, Suriname River, 1955

The most important towns are Moengo, the largest town in Marowijne District, and Diitabiki (old name: Drietabbetje) which is the residence of the granman (paramount chief) of the Ndyuka people since 1950.

== History ==
The Ndyuka people are descended from enslaved Africans who were transported by European slave ships to the Dutch colony of Surinam between the 17th and 19th centuries to work on slave plantations. Enslaved people who escaped slavery in Surinam fled into the colony's interior where they became known as maroons and established communities along rivers in southeastern Surinam and parts of the neighboring French colony of Cayenne, where they adopted elements of indigenous cultures. It is rare for Ndyuka people to marry outside the group, "so they remain genetically close to their African ancestors."

In 1757, a large slave rebellion took place at six wood plantations near the Tempati Creek. The runaway slaves joined an existing group of maroons. The Society of Suriname was concerned about the size and strength of the group, and a Dutch captain named Zobre was dispatched on 30 July 1759 to negotiate with them. Zobre returned with a temporary ceasefire agreement, and information that the tribe consisted of six villages with an estimated population of 2,000 people. The second expedition was less successful: the Ndyuka were disappointed in gifts such as mirrors and said that they preferred guns and ammunition. They also wanted the Jodensavanne planters to be present at the negotiations.

On 10 October 1760, the Ndyuka signed a treaty with the Dutch colonial authorities, recognizing the former's territorial autonomy. Day of the Maroons has been observed as a national holiday in Suriname on 10 October since 2010.

=== Autonomous people ===
From 1761, many Ndyuka gradually moved southwards from Marowijne District in order to protect themselves from the Dutch, and started to build camps on the Tapanahoni River and displacing the indigenous Tiriyó people. Slaves who had recently fled from Armina and Boven Commewijne were stationed near the confluence of the Tapanahoni and Lawa River to guard against attacks by the Aluku. In December 1791, the Dutchman Philip Stoelman founded a military outpost on Stoelmanseiland, thus establishing a militarised border between Ndyuka territory and Surinam. Tapanahony was off-limits to white colonists, and was not explored until the beginning of the 20th century.

=== Trade ===
Even though Tapanahony was isolated and generally neglected by the government, it was not completely self-sufficient. Trade was encouraged by both sides; article 7 of the Treaty can be regarded as a free-trade agreement. Between 1880 and 1930, the Ndyuka managed to gain a near monopoly on the freight trade between Albina, Suriname and Saint-Laurent-du-Maroni, French Guiana in the north, and the Surinamese and French Guianese interiors in the south. In 1921, the Maroon Freighter Strike was called and lasted three months. The strike had serious economic consequences, and severely disrupted the Balatá and gold industry in both countries. Governor van Heemstra even threatened to end the autonomy of the Ndyuka over the strike.

=== Development and health care ===
In 1919, a pilot project to improve agriculture, education and medical care failed, because the necessary funds were never supplied. The Ndyuka were later blamed because they resisted the imposition of taxation. On 6 May 1924, Pieter Walther Hering postulated in the Colonial States: "Economically, the Bushnegroes thus far have had little significance for the Colony, and that is not their fault, but the Dutch Government's [fault], which has neglected these people, and tolerated that today, in the 20th century, we are still talking about Bushnegroes."

Generally, medical care was provided free for Maroons who journeyed to the coastal area. An attempt in 1913 to charge for medical care in the hospitals was ignored in practice, and later revoked by Governor Johannes Kielstra, because it was better for the overall sanitary conditions. In a 1943 meeting between the Governor and the granmans the population decline in the tribal areas was discussed. The granmans talked about alarming rates of tuberculosis, malaria, and infertility. The proposed solution was to send a medical team into the tribal areas, and make people aware about the dangers of inbreeding. In 1946, Medische Zending was put in charge of the health care in tribal areas. The improved medical care resulted in a rapid population growth.

=== Interior War ===
In the late 1980s, the Surinamese Interior War was fought between the Suriname National Army and a rebel group known as the Jungle Commando, led by Ronnie Brunswijk. The civil war resulted in a refugee crisis into French Guiana especially from the Marowijne District. Even though Brunswijk was a Ndyuka, Gaanman Gazon, the paramount chief, refused to take sides in the conflict, and maintained strict neutrality in the Tapanahony resort. On 26 May 1987, Gazon published a plea to the international community for mediation.

=== Current situation ===
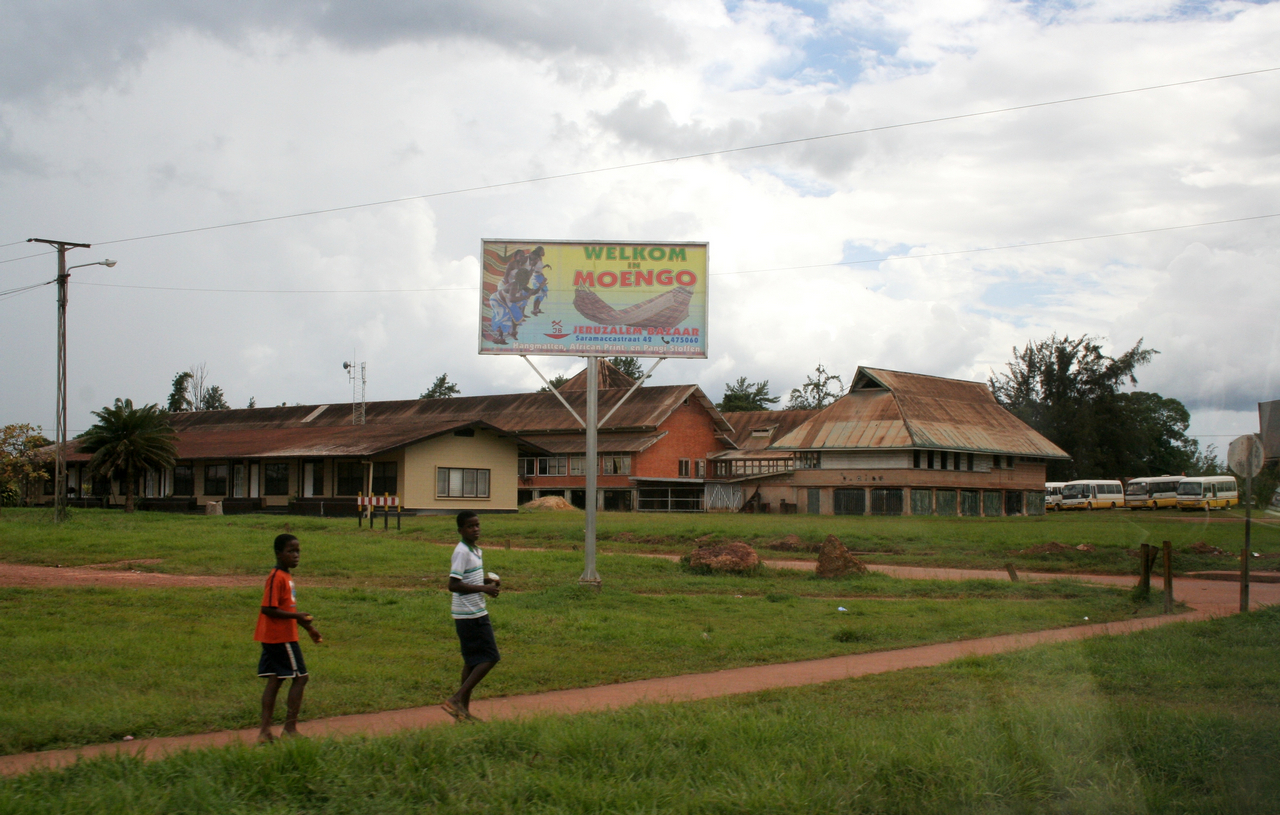
Moengo (2008)

In the last decades of the 20th century a large number of the Ndyuka people began moving from their ancestral villages to the coast, especially in and around Paramaribo, the country's capital. Their motivations for moving were mainly economic. As of 2014, of the estimated 90,000 Ndyukas, only 26,000 live in the tribal lands, while 30,000 live in and around Paramaribo, 21,000 in French Guiana and 7,500 in the Netherlands.

On 19 August 2000, a kabiten (captain) was installed for the Ndyuka Maroon community in diaspora. In Utrecht, André R.M. Pakosie was installed as captain for the Netherlands.

On 13 June 2020, Ronnie Brunswijk was elected Vice President of Suriname by acclamation in an uncontested election. He was inaugurated on 16 July as the first Maroon in Suriname to serve as vice president.

== Governance ==
The Treaty of 1760 allowed the Ndyuka privileges, but also imposed restrictions like the return of runaway slaves, and in case of an external war, they must provide an army to fight with the Suriname National Army.

Originally the tribe was free to settle anywhere with permission providing it was at a distance of at least ten hours from the plantations. That definition was rather vague, and in 1837, it was changed to a delimited area around the Cottica River in Marowijne District, and the Tapanahony River.

The paramount chief of the Ndyuka is the granman. Below the granman are the kabitens (captains) followed by the basiyas (aldermen). The stam lanti consists of all the kabitens and basiyas who meet at least once a year under the authority of the granman and decide the policy for the entire tribe.

A village has a lo lanti (council) consisting of the kabitens and basiyas of the village who are advised by a council of elders. The lo lanti acts as the local government. In case of important decisions, the whole village participates and a decision is taken on the basis of consensus.

The resorts in the Marowijne District are governed by a Resort Council, democratically elected at the General Election. This has caused as an overlap with lo lanti. The decentralization commission was aware of the problem in 2007, but as of 2020, the two systems existed side by side.

For Tapanahony, a district commissioner is appointed to represent the Surinamese government. This is a continuation of the posthouders (post holders) which were installed after the Treaty to represent the state.

In the draft agreement, there was a provision for an independent judicial system except for the crimes which could carry a death sentence. The article caused much debate, and was dropped altogether in the final agreement. In practice an independent judicial system was in operation except for people accused of major crimes who were turned over to the Suriname government. In the second half of the 20th century, the system became obsolete for criminal cases.

Even though the Treaty has significant implications for Suriname, it was not mentioned in the Government Regulations of 1865 nor in the Constitution of 1936. In 1975, in preparation of the Independence of Suriname, the treaties with the Maroons were subject to much debate in both the Dutch and Surinamese parliaments, however the Maroon autonomy has not been mentioned once in both the Constitution of Suriname or the Declaration of Independence. The Treaty deals with the rights and obligations of the tribe, however the Constitution does not mention the tribe or its government, therefore if the granman says no, the issue can be pushed through, because the legal position of the granman has not been defined.

Nevertheless, the treaties are still in effect. In 2005, the Inter-American Court of Human Rights ruled on the 1986 Moiwana massacre. The court upheld the 1760 Treaty, and determined that "the Moiwana community members may be considered the legitimate owners of their traditional lands."

== Lifestyle ==
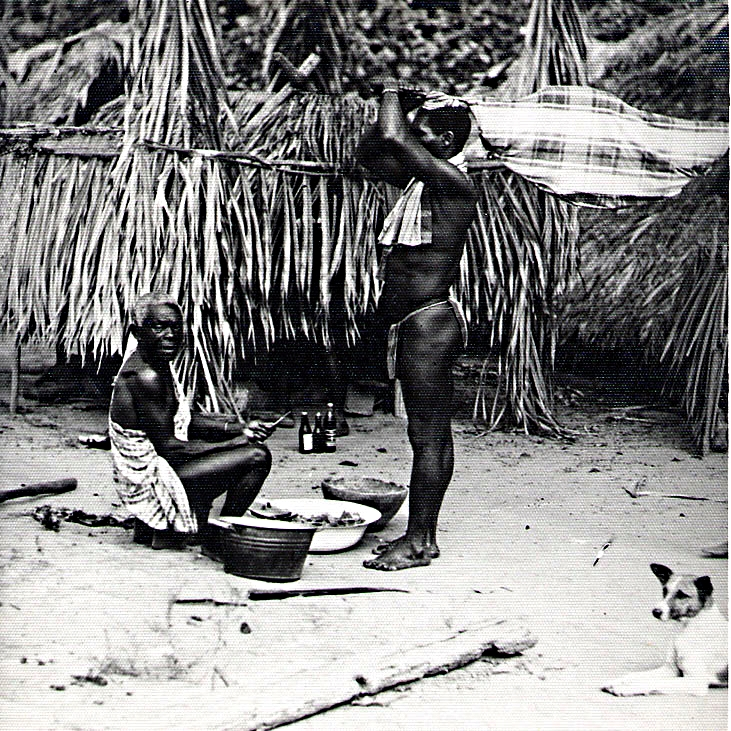
Body of Ndyuka Maroon child brought before a medicine man, Suriname River, Suriname, South America, 1955

The Milwaukee Public Museum says the following about the Ndyuka and their way of Maroon life:

Among the Ndyuka, as in all other Maroon tribes, everyone works on artistic projects in everyday activities, and are admired for their excellent skill in woodcarving, calabash carving, and textile arts. Social relationships and tokens of love and affection are the central reason for the production of art. Historically, only men practiced woodcarving, while women did calabash carving and textile arts. Because objects were created as gifts men have large collections of clothes, capes, and breech clothes from wives and past lovers, while women own large collections of wooden objects like food stirrers, stools, trays, and peanut grinding plates. Calabash carving, also prevalent but done mostly by women, produces spoons and dishes with intricate designs for everyday use. Women's textile arts, produced as exchange gifts for a husband or lover, have transformed greatly as access to trade cotton from the coast has increased. Trends in fashion change quickly, utilizing elaborate embroidery, appliqué, and patchwork, with women freely borrowing from others while making it their own.

== Religion ==
The traditional religion of the Ndyuka was Winti, a synthesis of African religion traditions. The Marowijne District was accessible to outsiders, and the Catholic and Moravian Church founded churches and schools first in neighbouring Albina and later in the Maroon villages. Attempts to convert Tapanahony were not successful at first, until 1864 when the Moravian Church sent the Maroon missionary Johannes King to the granman. The extensive traditional funerary rites are generally practised, and Winti is a major religion, however the majority are Christians.

== Notable people ==
- Florian Jozefzoon
- Lénaïck Adam (1992), French politician
- Ronnie Brunswijk (1961), ex Vice President of Suriname(2020-2025) and ex-rebel leader
- Gaanman Gazon (1920–2011), former granman
- André Pakosie (1955), writer and activist

== Bibliography ==
- Inter-American Court of Human Rights (2005). "Moiwana Community v. Suriname, Case Summary" (PDF). Loyola Law School.
- Köbben, A.J.F. (1968). "Continuity in change – Cottica Djuka society as a changing system". Research Gate. Bijdragen tot de Taal-, Land- en Volkenkunde / Journal of the Humanities and Social Sciences of Southeast Asia and Oceania.
- Plan Bureau (2014). "Planning Office Suriname – Districts 2009–2013" (PDF). Planning Office Suriname (in Dutch).
- Pakosie, André (1990). "Arrogantie versus traditie". De Gids Jaargang 153 (in Dutch). Digital Library for Dutch Literature.
- Price, Richard (2001). "Maroons under Assault In Suriname And French Guiana". Cultural Survival. Cultural Survival Quarterly Magazine.
- Scholtens, Ben (1994). Bosneger en overheid in Suriname. Radboud University Nijmegen (Thesis) (in Dutch). Paramaribo: Afdeling Cultuurstudies/Minov. ISBN 9991410155.
