= Jeronimo Clifford =

English-born Surinamese plantation owner

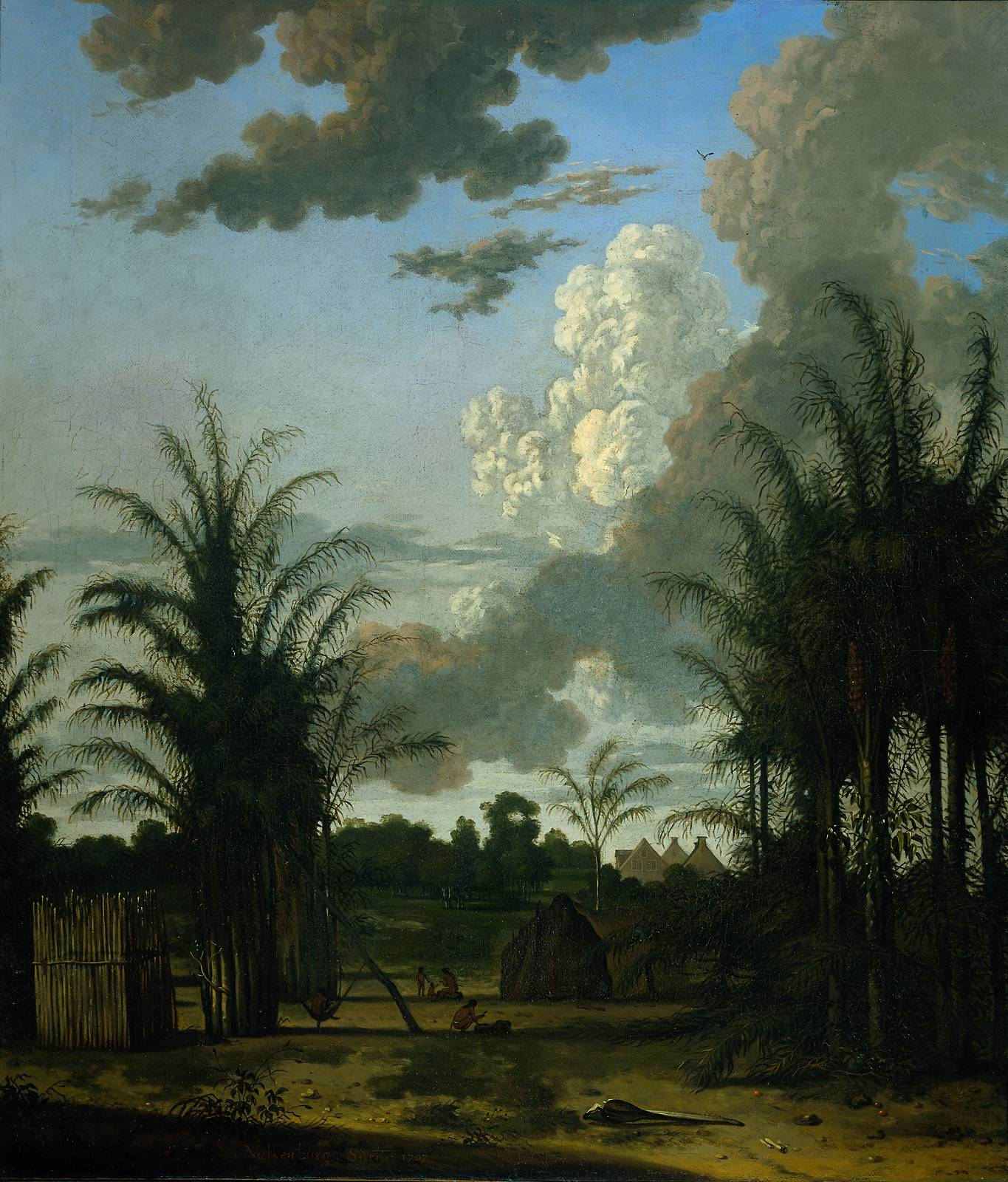
A plantation in Suriname by Dirk Valkenburg (1707?)

Jeronimo, Jeronimy or Hierome Clifford was one of the biggest plantation-owners in Suriname in the late 17th century.

== Life ==
Jeronimy Clifford was baptised on 24 May 1657 at Egham, Surrey where his name is recorded as Jeronemy Cleford and his father is shown as Andrew Cleford.

Suriname was settled by the English in 1650, but surrendered to the Zeelanders in 1674. Of the 120 English families living there 80 families wanted to leave. Two ships, the Hercules and the America were sent to transport 1100 or 1200 people to Barbados or Jamaica. In August 1675 Clifford sold his plantation to Rowland Simpson and left the month after. Clifford and his son returned to Suriname a year later, when the interim-governor Pieter Versterre (who seems to have been involved in the affair) did not give permission to the London moneylender to pay them.

In 1683 Jeronimy married the English woman Dorothea Matson, who had inherited Courcabo on the death of her husband Abraham Schoors. He married Dorothie Masman on 2 August 1683 at Holy Trinity Minories, City of London. Courcabo was the largest sugar-plantation in Suriname (1500 acres), with a mill, a boiling, a dwelling and an overseer's house, a cook room, a cattlehouse, 22 huts for 117 slaves. During its existence from 1675 to 1737 it accounted for 6% of all sugar production, though its history is not entirely clear. Clifford then travelled to Amsterdam and signed a protest about the skipper's treatment of some seamen. In 1685 Jeronimo Clifford bought a plantation on Jamaica, but was fined in Paramaribo. (The order of the above events is unclear.) In 1687 he made a new attempt to bring over his possessions over to Jamaica.

In 1685 Jeronimo's father Andrew left Suriname and transferred his business affairs to his son. After this, in 1689, Jeronimo Clifford hit difficulties with governor Johan van Scharphuizen, causing bad blood and years of court proceedings undertaken by Jeronimo that 60 years later finally had to be arbitrated by the English. In 1689 Jeronimo was imprisoned in Fort Sommelsdijk, then in 1692 he was condemned to be hanged, though this was commuted to seven years' imprisonment. Clifford was even allowed to build his own house within the walls of the prison. He was released in 1695 on the stadholder's William III of England intervention, while Van Scharphuizen was recalled and was followed by Paul van der Veen.

Later in 1695 he wished to leave for Jamaica to set up a new plantation, but events in England weighed against him. Between 1696 and 1700 Clifford remained in Amsterdam, demanding 224,718 guilders (more than £23.000) from the Society of Suriname in multiple compensation proceedings. He signed a protest to William III of England and referred to the agreements between Britain and the Dutch Republic set up by the Peace of Breda in 1667 and by the Treaty of Westminster in 1674.

In 1700 he wanted to be (or he was) given permission to transport goods and slaves out of Suriname, but demanded a considerably higher sum (342,693 guilders) as damages. In 1702 he wrote a petition to Queen Anne in relation to his proceedings against the directors of the Society of Suriname. The raadpensionaris Anthonie Heinsius gave Clifford little chance of success and judged that the case should not be tried in England, but could be tried in the Netherlands. In 1704 he was imprisoned for debt again, this time in the Fleet Prison. In 1704, 1705, 1711, 1713, 1714, 1715 and 1720 he filed more protests. Sir Robert Walpole advised him to see off any further claims from the States General.

Andrew Clifford was buried at St Dunstan, Stepney on 31 December 1701. Dorothy Clifford was buried on 2 June 1708 at St Dunstan and All Saints, Stepney. Jeronimo Clifford died in 1737, possibly at a bakery near Charing Cross, where he is recorded as having rooms in 1727. He was buried on 14 September 1737 at St Mary Magdalen, Southwark, recorded as Ironimus Clifford.

In 1760 his heirs published a pamphlet with an account of the case and of daily life in Suriname, entitled The Case of Andrew Clifford, and Jeronomy Clifford, late planters in Surinam. Respecting certain claims on the Dutch Government. His family lived in Kent.

== Sources ==
- The Case of Jeronimy Clifford, Merchant and Planter of Surinam. A Short Abridgment of Mr. Jeronimy Clifford's Case, Printed and Dated 26 March 1711, which he deliver'd in the Year 1711 to her Majesty's most Honourable Privy Council. To the late Dutch Envoy Mr. Vrybergen, and in the Year 1713 to both the Houses of Parliament. London, Printed 10 May 1714
- The Conduct of the Dutch, Relating to their Breach of Treaties with England, Particularly Their Breach of the Articles of Capitulation, for the Surrender of Surinam, in 1667; and their Oppressions committed upon the English Subjects in that Colony.With a full Account of the Case of Jeronimy Clifford, late Merchant and Planter of Surinam, deceased; the unparalleled Injuries and Cruelties inflicted on him and his Estate by the Dutch; and the great Losse sustained &c.London, 1760
- The Case and Replication of the Legal Representatives of Jeronimy Clifford; a British Subject; and late Merchant and Planter of Surinam, deceased, to the Information of the Directors of the Society of Surinam, Presented, on 7 October 1762, To their High Mightinesses the Lords States General of the United Provinces, &c. London 1763; met uitslaande kaart van Suriname, geflankeerd door delen van Berbice en Cayenne, met opname van de suikerplantage Corcabo
