= Johan van Scharphuizen =

Dutch Surinamese judge, slave trader, and colonial governor

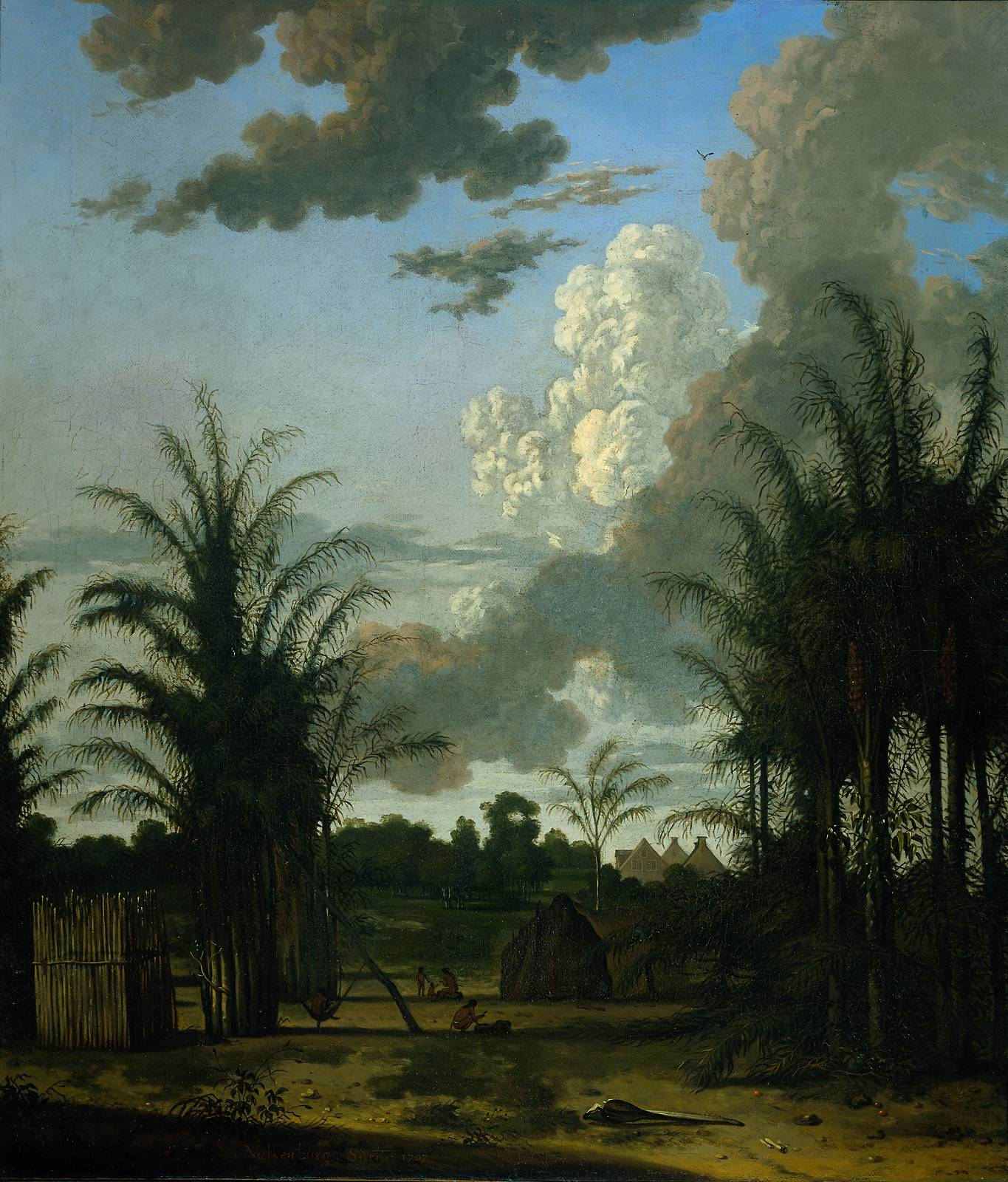
Plantation in Suriname door Dirk Valkenburg, 1707

Joan or Johan van Scharphuysen, Scharphuizen or Jan van Scherpenhuizen (died 15 January 1699) was a Dutch colonist, a judge in Suriname, a slave trader, colonial governor from 1689 to 1696 on behalf of the Society of Surinam, (Sociëteit van Suriname) and a considerable plantation-owner.

== Life ==
Van Scharphuizen most probably had his roots in Zeeland: he was a brother-in-law to both Johannes Basseliers, the first Dutch vicar in Suriname (1668) and a rich planter, and to Jan Meunicx, both originating from Middelburg, where the Dutch West India Company had a strong base. The Meunicx family, regents and respected traders, settled as one of the first Dutch families in Suriname arriving just before or after Francis Willoughby, 5th Baron Willoughby of Parham had left the colony.

From 1677 Van Scharphuizen served as a member in the Raad van Politie (Council of Police). From 1678 to 1684 he lived in Zeeland and Holland to guard the interests of the plantation owners in Suriname. In 1682 he was counselled to develop a patent to the Society of Surinam. He was involved in slave trade in 1685 and then moved again to the Dutch Republic.

On 20 December 1688 Van Scharphuizen was installed as governor of the colony. He set sail on 14 January 1689 and set foot ashore on 12 March, accompanied by François van Aerssen (1669–1740), the son of the former and assassinated governor. Van Scharphuizen was immediately involved in several complicated cases: an attack by French pirate and slave trader Jean Baptiste du Casse; dealing with the complicated legacy of his predecessor, Cornelis van Aerssen van Sommelsdijck - Van Scharphuizen corrected some illegitimate tax rules, originating from his predecessor - and a case of illegal transport and selling of slaves on his name. Besides Van Scharphuizen got into a conflict with Jeronimo Clifford, an English planter, who inherited through marriage the largest plantation in the colony. Clifford wanted to leave and move his equipment and slaves to Jamaica, but was forced to stay in Suriname; he was fined considerably and while he refused to pay for seven years imprisoned in Fort Sommelsdijck. In the meantime his plantation was ruined and occupied. When Clifford was released he requested the Society of Surinam and the States-General of the Netherlands for 241,894 Dutch Guilders as a compensation, but the money was never paid for unstandable reasons.)

In 1691 Van Scharphuizen gave the Jodensavanne the legal status of settlement, but as a true Calvinist he forbade the Jewish planter to have their slaves work on Sundays. (At that time there was a fierce theological debate between Gisbertus Voetius and Johannes Cocceius on the Fourth Commandment: the Sunday's rest. The debate influenced the planters in the colony as well). Because of the high prices and the lack of fresh vegetables Van Scharphuizen allowed his slaves to sell products from their own and small allotments on the market. In those days 66 Jews were forced to deliver 25,905 pounds of sugar for building a new hospital in Paramaribo. Van Scharphuizen awarded a patent to the carpenter to construct waterworks, c.q. a sugar mill working on low and high tides.

Van Scharphuizen is said to have been captured by French pirates in 1695. In October 1696 he was back in Amsterdam and convicted for illegal slave trade and the issuing of promissory notes of the Sociëteit. Being governor he was not allowed to have his interest in more than three ships nor was he allowed to trade. Samuel de Nassy and Baron de Belmonte had made sure Van Scharphuizen returned because Jewish planters could not accept allowing the slaves not working on Sunday. His successor as a governor was the amicable Paulus van der Veen.

In 1698 Van Scharphuizen bought a canal house on the Keizersgracht, almost next door to the Schouwburg of Van Campen. He died the following year and was buried on the high choir of the Nieuwe Kerk in Amsterdam. Jan Munnincx's children inherited a large sum of money, a house and the plantation Vrientsburgh. Jonas Witsen was the main inheritor of the possessions of Van Scharphuizen, being married to Elisabeth Basseliers (1680–1702); he became the owner of Waterland and Palmeniribo; in 1702, when his wife died during childbirth he inherited also Surimonbo formerly owned by his father-in-law, referent Basseliers. The rest of the legacy went to the staff, his friends Johann Frederick Baghman, a German planter and Nicolaes Witsen, executor of his will. His house slave or servant became a free man and got an allowance of 200 guilders a year.

In his will Van Scharphuizen had also stated that his slaves only had to work five days a week, allowing them to grow and sell vegetables on Saturdays an Sundays for their own income. In 1707 an uprising occurred in Palmeniribo when these liberties, but also the right to visit other plantations, were limited by the new owner, Jonas Witsen.

There has been a portrait of Van Scharphuizen; the artist is unknown.
