= Fort Nieuw-Amsterdam =

Fort near Nieuw-Amsterdam, Suriname

- Part of Suriname
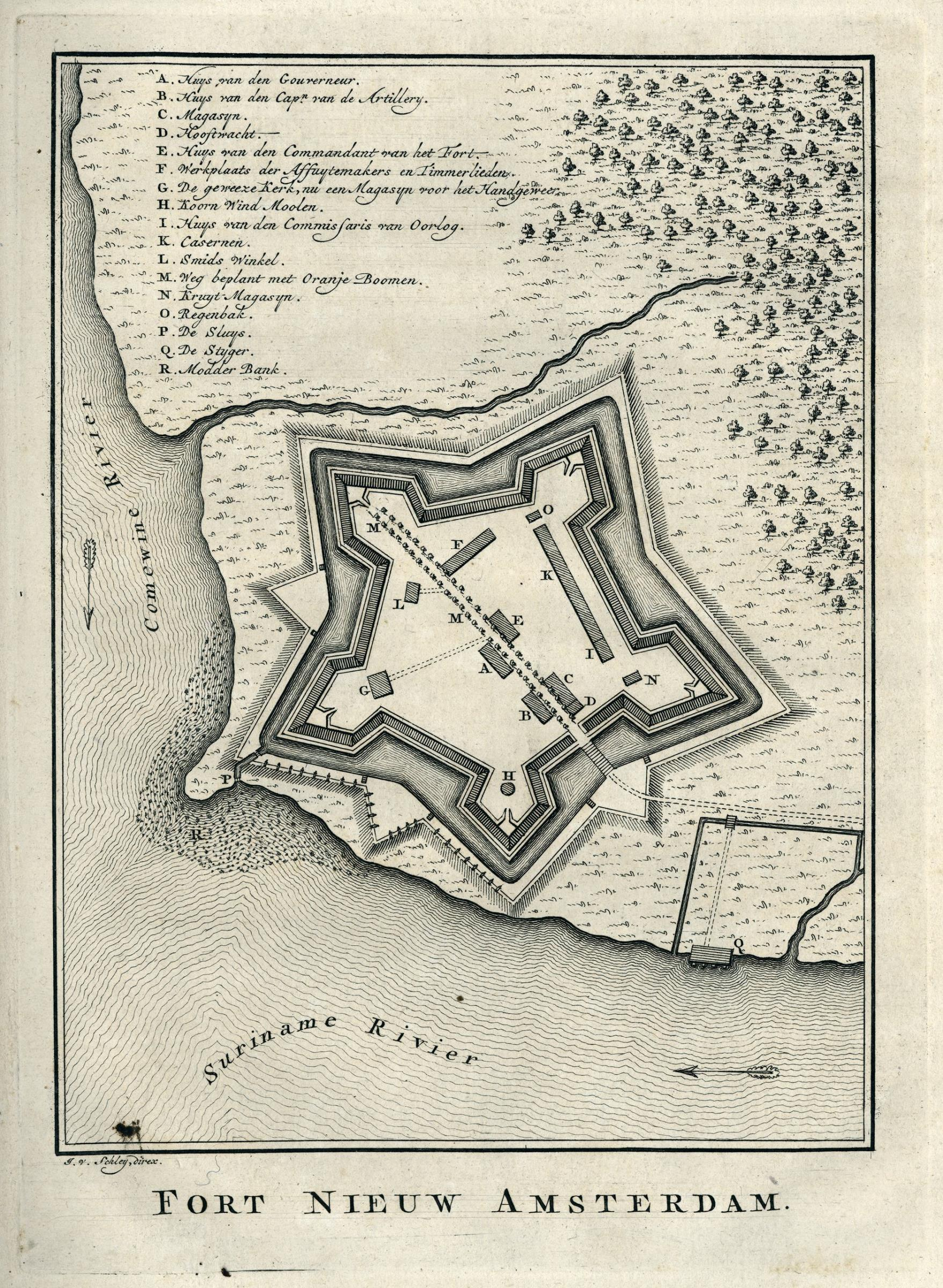
- Fort Nieuw-Amsterdam

Site information
- Open to the public: Yes

Location
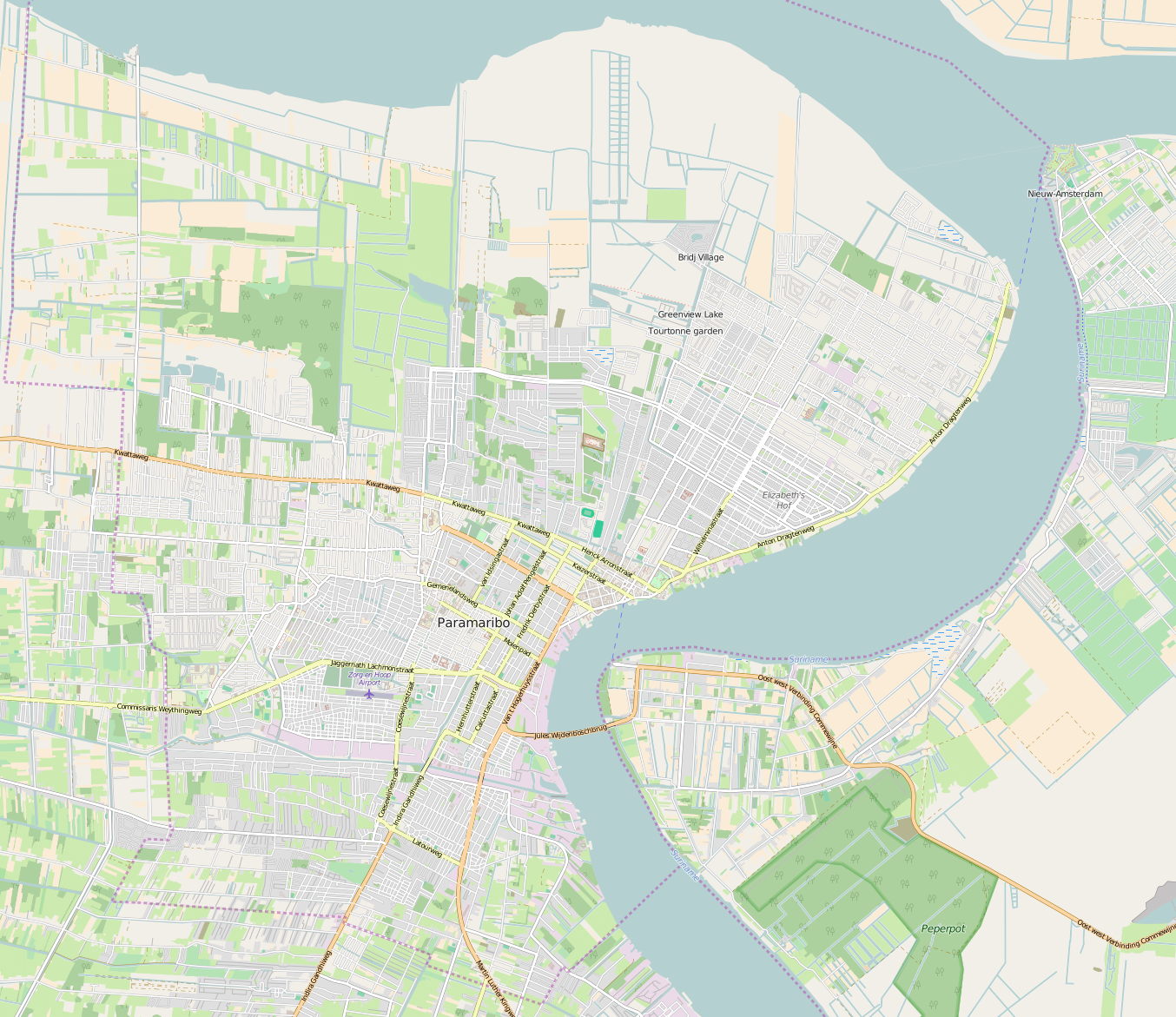
- Coordinates: 5.888056°N 55.091667°W

Site history
- Built: 1747
- Built by: Society of Suriname

Fort Nieuw-Amsterdam is a fort in Suriname built from 1734 to 1747 at the confluence of the Suriname and Commewijne rivers. It is open to the public as an open-air museum.

== History ==
The necessity of improving the fortifications of the colony of Suriname was underscored when French buccaneers under the leadership of Jacques Cassard attacked the colony in 1712. Fort Sommelsdijk, which was situated further upstream the Commewijne River at its confluence with the Cottica River was fortified for this purpose in 1715, but it was clear something more substantial needed to be done to defend the colony against foreign attacks. It was eventually decided to build a new fort at the confluence of the Suriname and Commewijne rivers. When Fort Nieuw-Amsterdam was completed in 1747, Fort Sommelsdijk was downgraded to a military outpost.

In 1804, the fort was captured by British forces led by Samuel Hood and Charles Green, during the Invasion of Suriname, which was a campaign during the Napoleonic Wars. This battle was notable for being the first usage of Shrapnel shells.

Between 1863 and 1967, the fort was used as a prison. It is the location of the decommissioned lightvessel Suriname-Rivier, which is permanently moored in a wet dock inside the fort. After the independence of Suriname, a monument was erected in the fort.

== See also ==
- Fort Zeelandia (Paramaribo)
- List of museums in Suriname

== Gallery ==
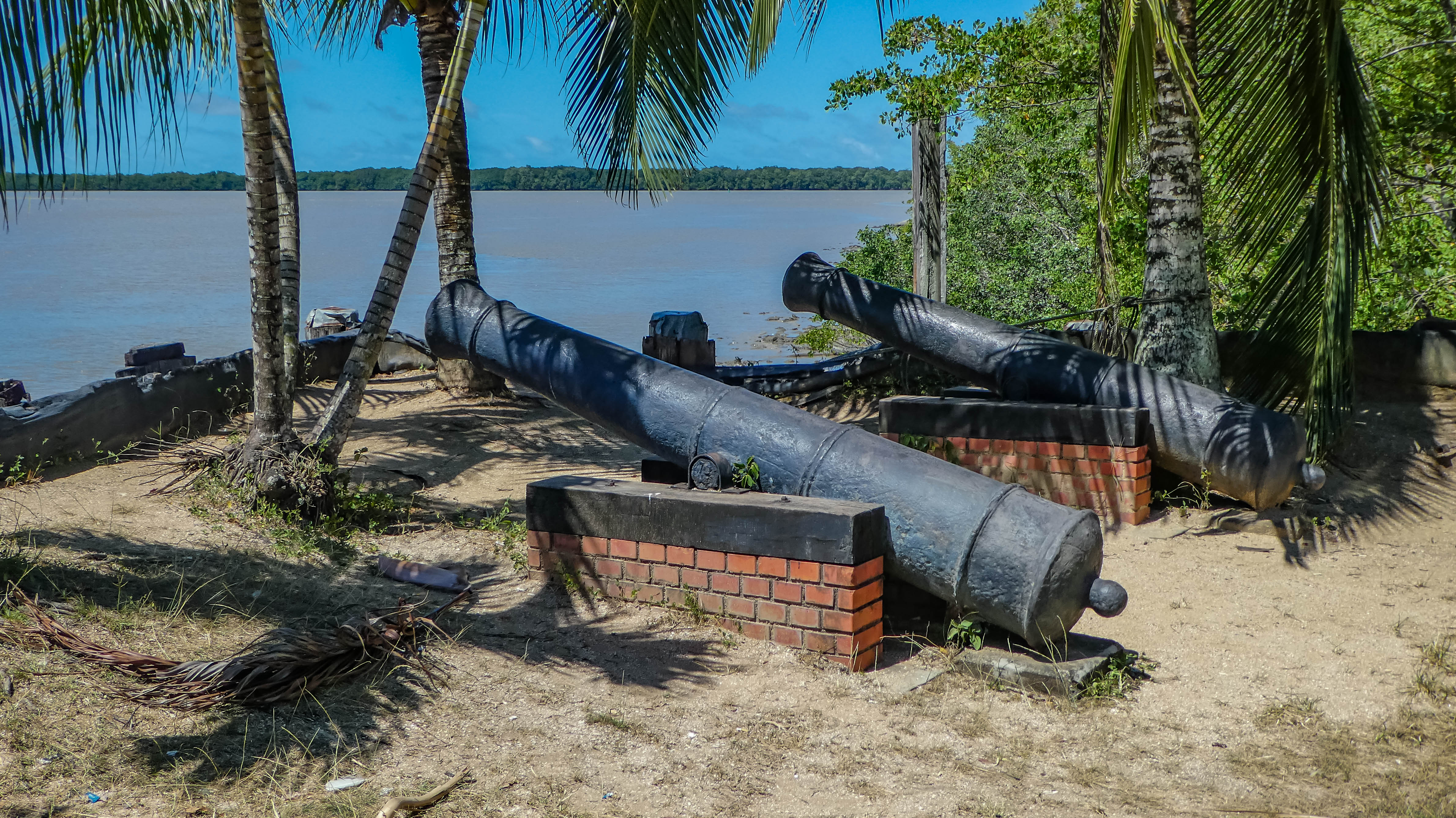
Cannon near the fort

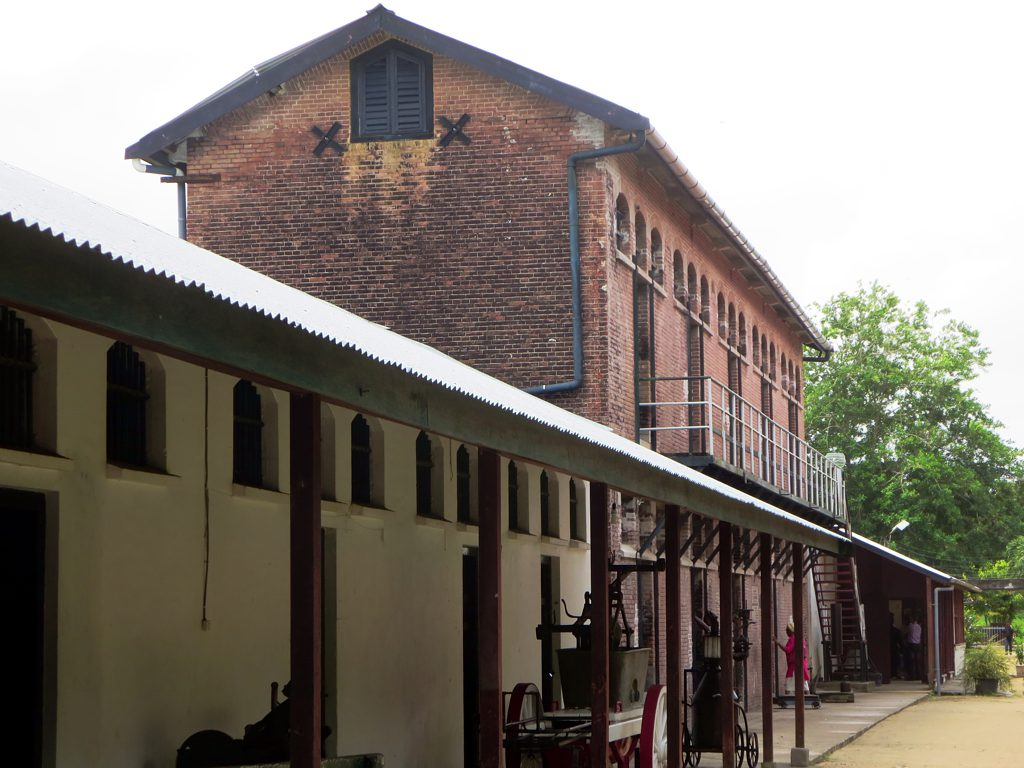
Former prison

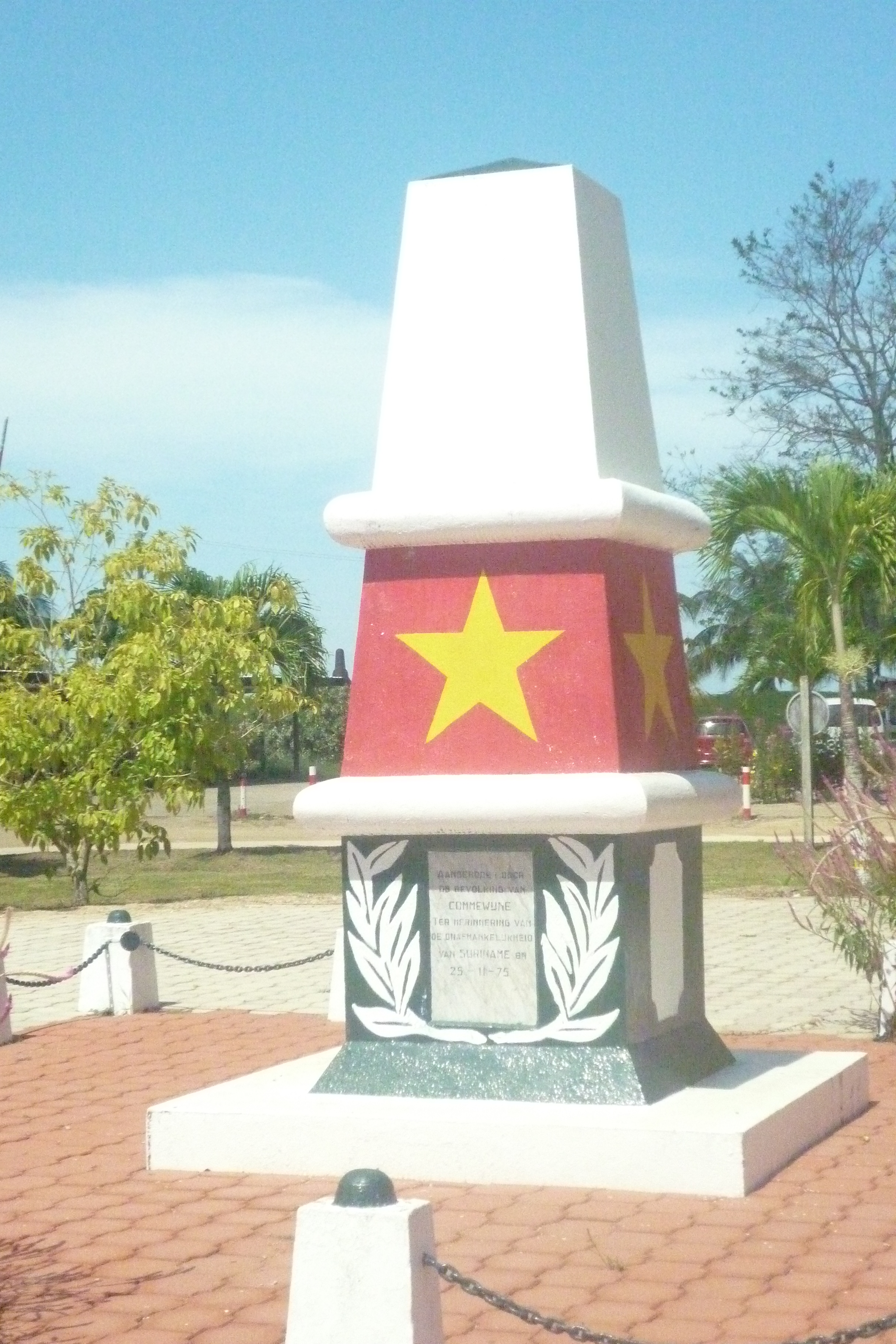
Independence monument
