= List of lighthouses in Suriname =

This is a list of lighthouses in Suriname.

== Lighthouses ==
Name	Image	Year built	Location & coordinates (*)	Status	Tower height	NGA number	Admiralty number	ARLHS number
Hoek Galibi Lighthouse	Image	1871 est.	Galibi; 5°44′44.2″N 53°49′22.6″E	inactive since 2012	60 metres (200 ft)	ex-17400	ex-J6882	SUR-001
Lightship Suriname 1 (Riviere)	Image	1911	Paramaribo District; 5°53′22.9″N 55°05′28.6″W	decommissioned in 1972, permanently moored in the Fort Nieuw-Amsterdam Open-Air Museum.	n/a	n/a	n/a	SUR-004M
Lightship Suriname 2	Image	1923	Paramaribo District; 5°31′42.8″N 55°02′43.8″W	decommissioned in 1981	40.3 metres (132 ft)	n/a	n/a	n/a
Lightship Suriname 3	Image	1923	Paramaribo District; 5°31′42.8″N 55°02′43.8″W	decommissioned in 1981	40.3 metres (132 ft)	n/a	n/a	n/a
Nickerie Rivier Lighthouse	Image	n/a	Nieuw Nickerie; 5°57′39.9″N 57°01′05.2″W	inactive since 2011	21 metres (69 ft)	ex-17356	ex-J6866	SUR-005

(*) Lightship coordinates after decommissioned

== See also ==
- Lists of lighthouses and lightvessels
