= Netherlands Armed Forces in Suriname =

Military force maintained by the Netherlands in its colony of Suriname

- Troepenmacht in Suriname
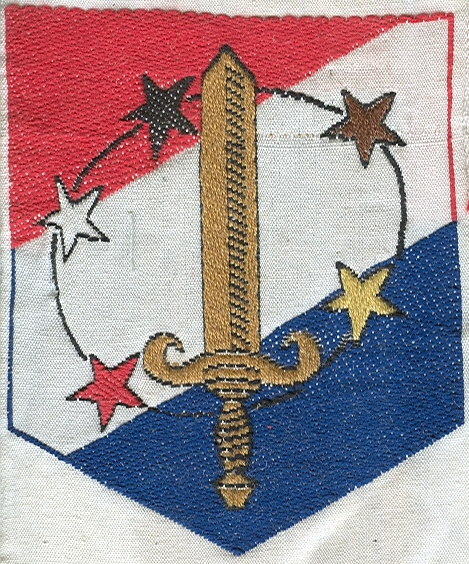
- Emblem of the Netherlands Armed Forces in Suriname
- Active: 1868–1975
- Country: Netherlands
- Type: Army
- Size: 636 personnel (1863); 299 personnel (1907); 3,850 personnel (1944)
- Part of: Royal Netherlands Army (1814–1868); Ministry of the Colonies (1868–1957); Netherlands Armed Forces (1957–1975)
- Headquarters: Paramaribo
- Anniversaries: 16 October
- Engagements: Napoleonic Wars: Battle of Waterloo; Suppression of the 1929 Curaçao riots World War II

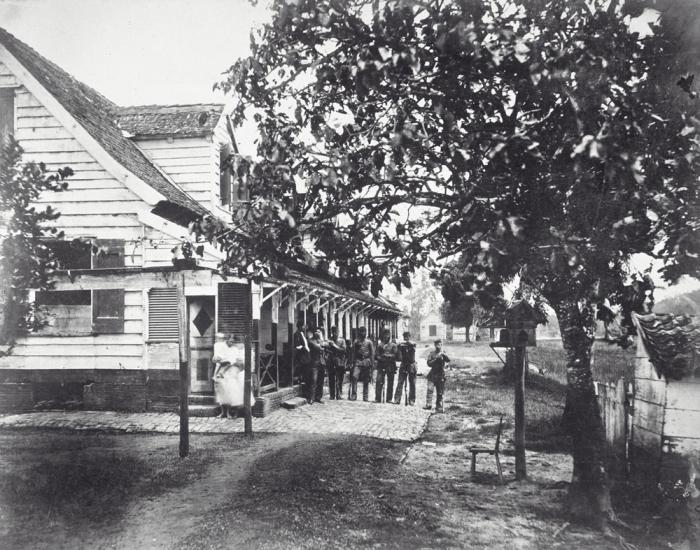
TRIS troops in Fort Sommelsdijk (1884)

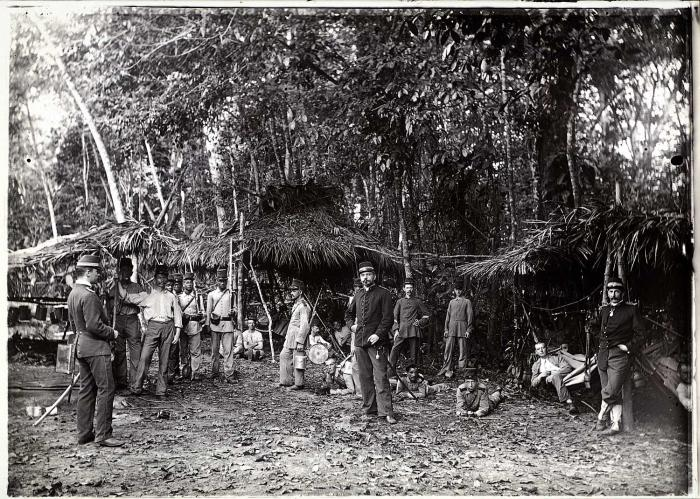
TRIS troops in a forest camp (c. 1904–1907)

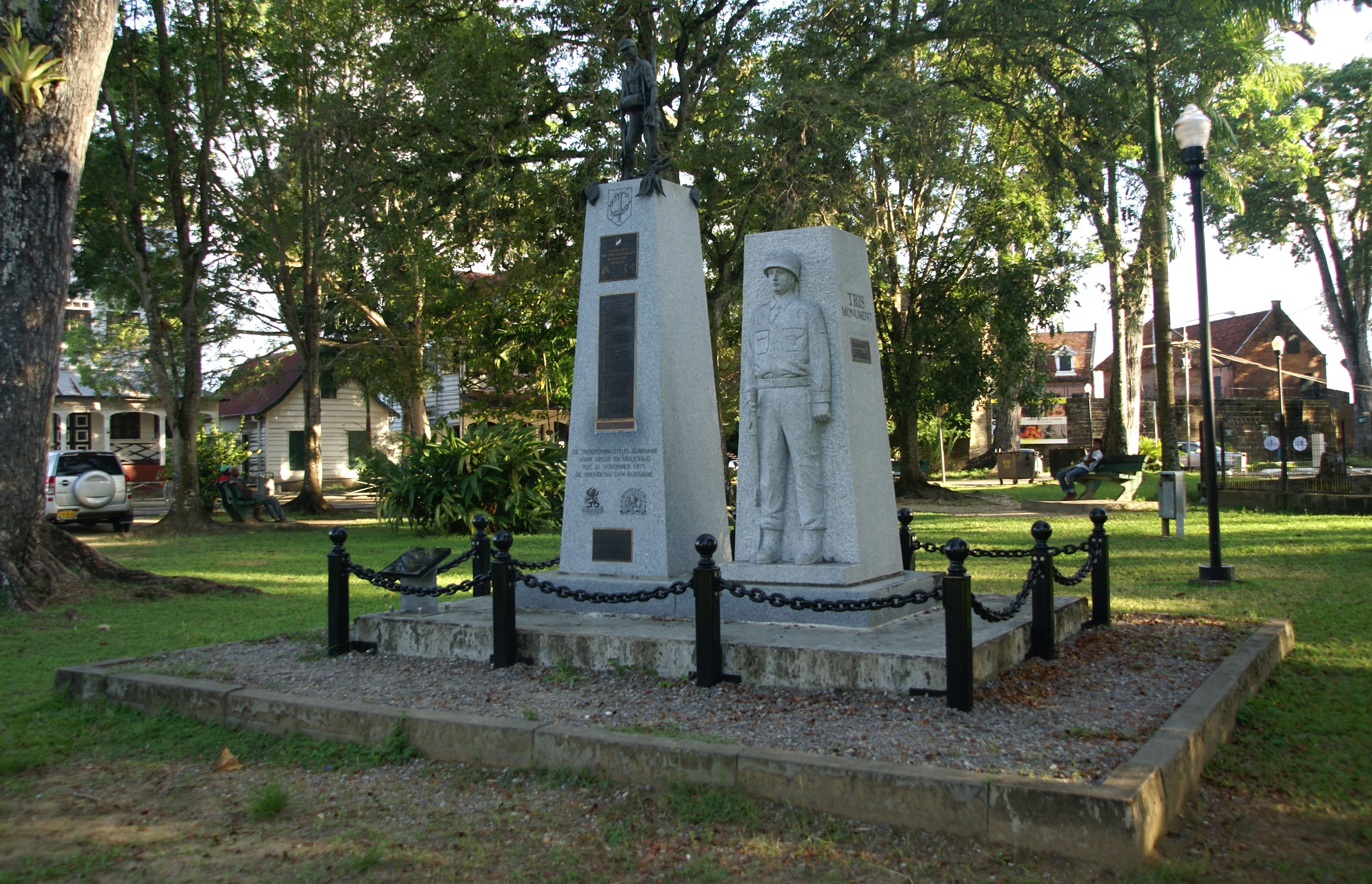
TRIS monument, near Fort Zeelandia (Paramaribo)

The Netherlands Armed Forces in Suriname (Troepenmacht in Suriname; TRIS, Dutch pronunciation: [trɪs]) was the military force maintained by the Kingdom of the Netherlands in its colony of Suriname (later known as the constituent country of Suriname), in the area that is now independent Republic of Suriname.

== History ==
Units from the Dutch Caribbean existed in the Royal Netherlands Army even before 1814. In 1815, the 10th and 11th battalions were created and participated in the Battle of Waterloo, the final battle of the Napoleonic Wars. In 1821, the 10th and 11th battalions were renamed 27th and 28th battalions. They were then combined into one 27th Battalion, which on 16 October 1868 was split into two divisions. The first is the "Troops of the Colonial Authorities on Curaçao", whose task was to defend Curaçao and Dependencies (later known as the Netherlands Antilles); the second is the "Colonial Forces in Suriname", whose task was to protect Suriname. These units were placed under the authority of the Ministry of the Colonies. In 1929, they participated in the suppression of the riots on the island of Curaçao.

In 1939, the Surinamese Militia was formed, which was a voluntary army of the people living in Suriname. The 2,000 American troops stationed in Suriname during World War II, to protect the bauxite industry and to guard against a Vichy French invasion from bordering French Guiana, were placed under the command of the militia.

In 1957, units of the Dutch colonial forces in Suriname were transferred from the Ministry of the Colonies to the Armed forces of the Netherlands. Following the declaration of Suriname's independence on 25 November 1975, the Colonial Forces were disbanded and many members of these units joined the newly created Surinamese Armed Forces (renamed the Suriname National Army in 1980).

== See also ==
- Royal Netherlands East Indies Army

== Bibliography ==
- H. Ringoir De Nederlandse Infanterie. Bussum, C.A.J van Dishoeck, 1968.
- van Putten, A.L.M. (1988). Inventaris van het archief van de Troepenmacht in Suriname, (1873) 1900-1975 (in Dutch). The Hague: Nationaal Archief.
