= Sommelsdijk =

- Village
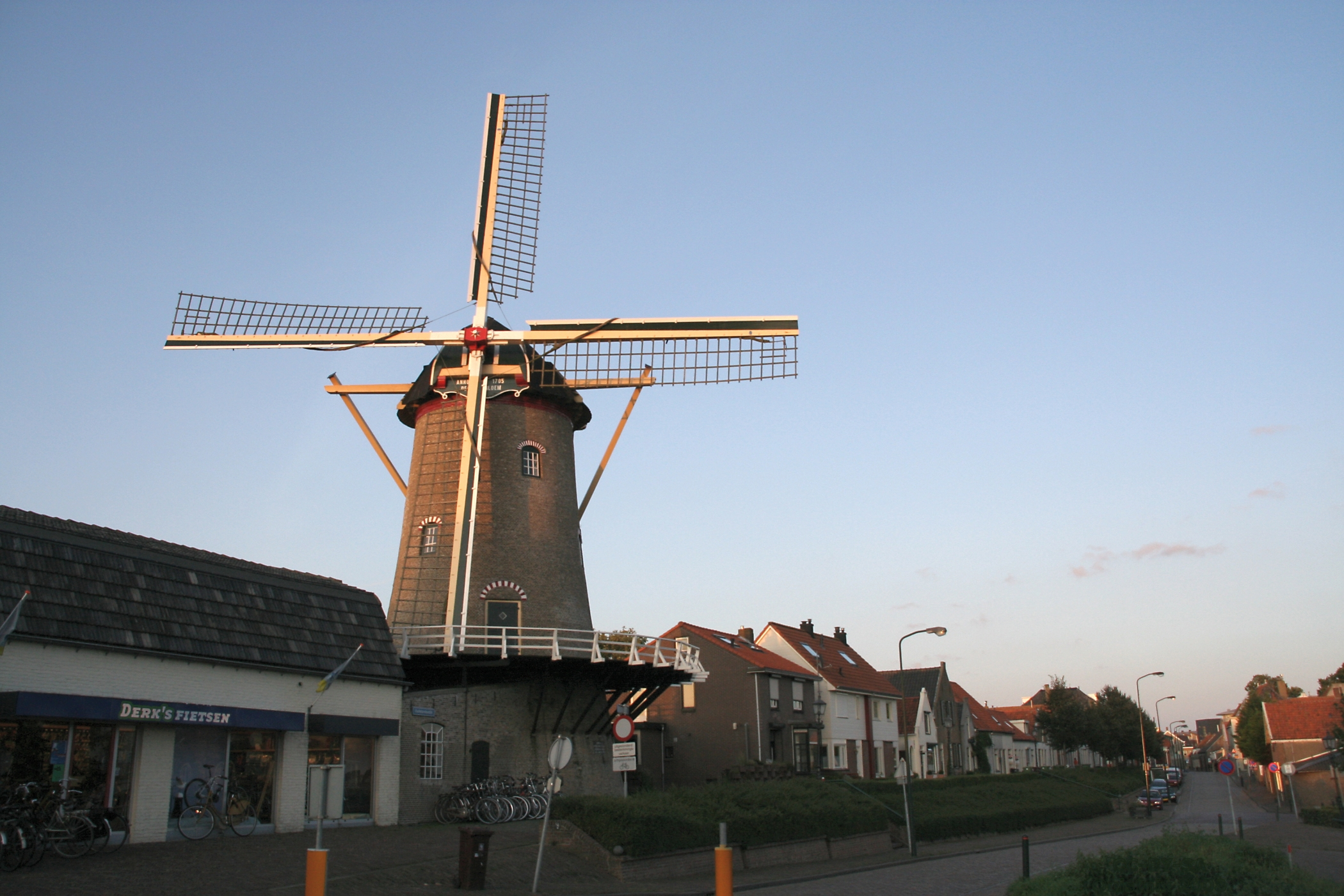
- Windmill De Korenbloem

- Flag Coat of arms

- Location in the province of South Holland in the Netherlands Location in the Netherlands
- Coordinates: 51°45′17″N 4°9′11″E
- Country: Netherlands
- Province: South Holland
- Municipality: Goeree-Overflakkee

Area
  - Total: 18.85 km^{2} (7.28 sq mi)
- Elevation: 1.3 m (4.3 ft)

Population (2021)
  - Total: 7,170
  - Density: 380/km^{2} (985/sq mi)
- Time zone: UTC+1 (CET)
  - Summer (DST): UTC+2 (CEST)
- Postal code: 3245
- Dialing code: 0187

Sommelsdijk is a village on the island of Goeree-Overflakkee, South Holland, the Netherlands, and part of the municipality of the same name. Sommelsdijk has (1 January 2022) 7,195 inhabitants which makes it the second largest settlement after Middelharnis on the island.

In the past, Sommelsdijk was the only place on the island of Goeree-Overflakee that was part of the province of Zeeland. In 1805 it was made a part of Holland, and remained such under the amendment of the Dutch Constitution of 1814.

Early March 1941 during the Second World War, nearly two hundred young men from Sommelsdijk were incarcerated for one month because of insulting the German army and the Dutch police.

Sommelsdijk was a separate municipality until 1966, when it became part of Middelharnis. Most recently, it was made part of the new municipality of Goeree-Overflakkee in 2013.

== Attractions ==
The centre of Sommelsdijk is protected by the Dutch Monument Law. Its Dutch Reformed Church used to be the largest church on the island, but not much remains of the original building, because of several fires and other damage.

Next to the church is the Streekmuseum Goeree-Overflakkee (Municipal Museum of Goeree-Overflakkee). The front street has several monumental buildings form the 17th and 18th centuries. On the western dike is a raised windmill.

== Notable people ==
- Arie Luyendijk (born 1953), winner of the Indy 500 (1990, 1997)
- Cornelis van Aerssen van Sommelsdijck

== Gallery ==
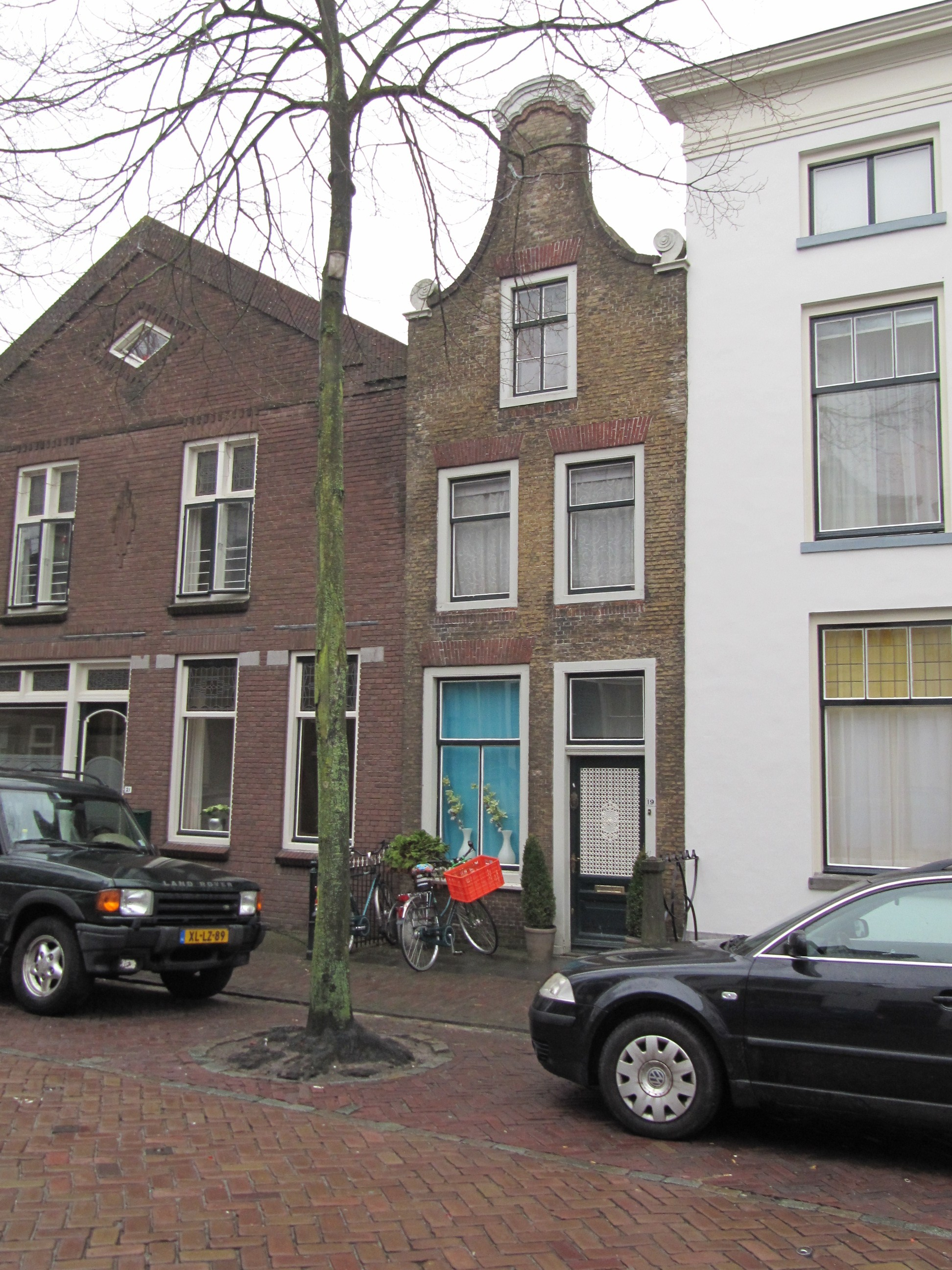
Houses in Sommeldijk

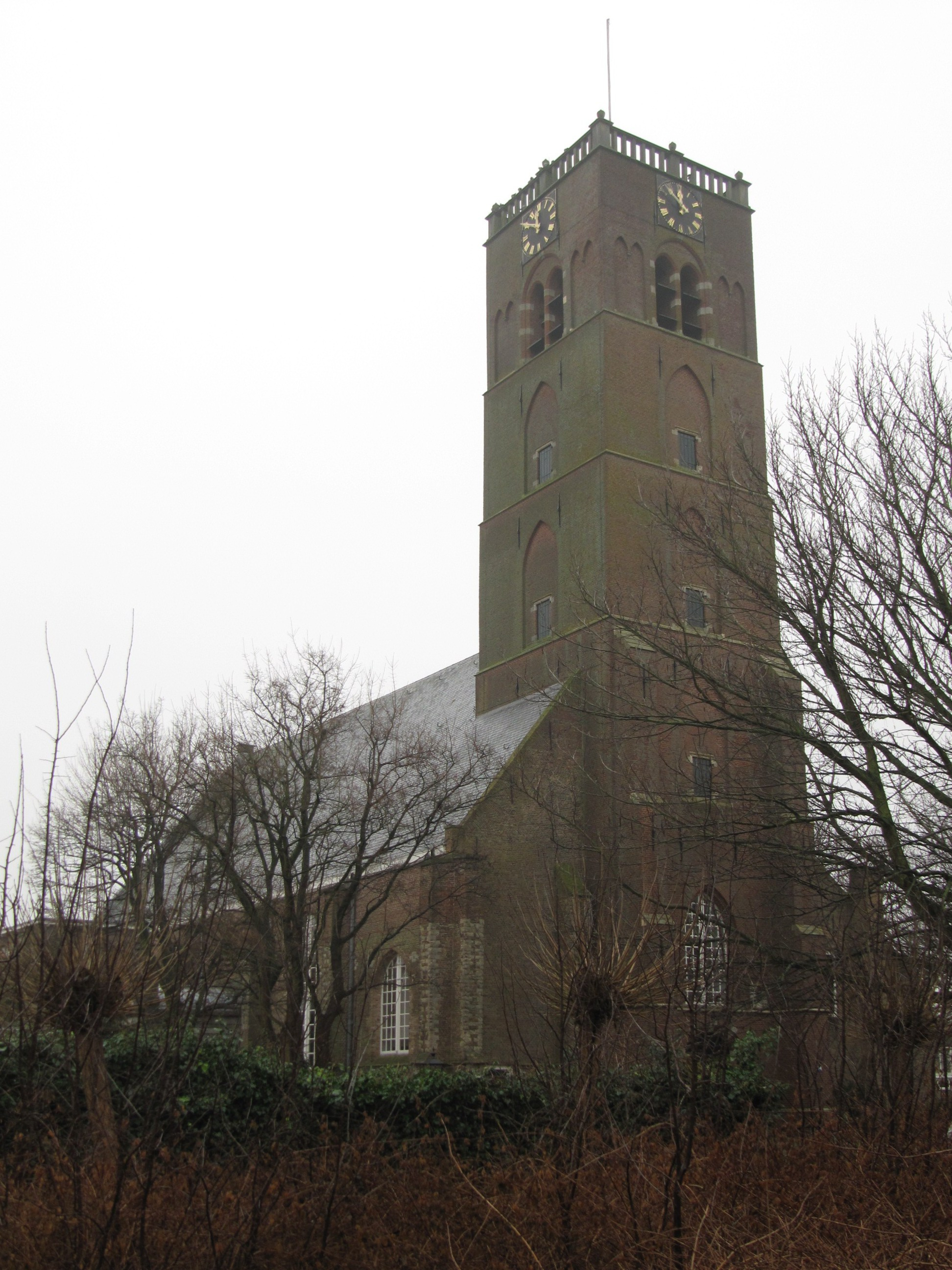
Dutch Reformed church

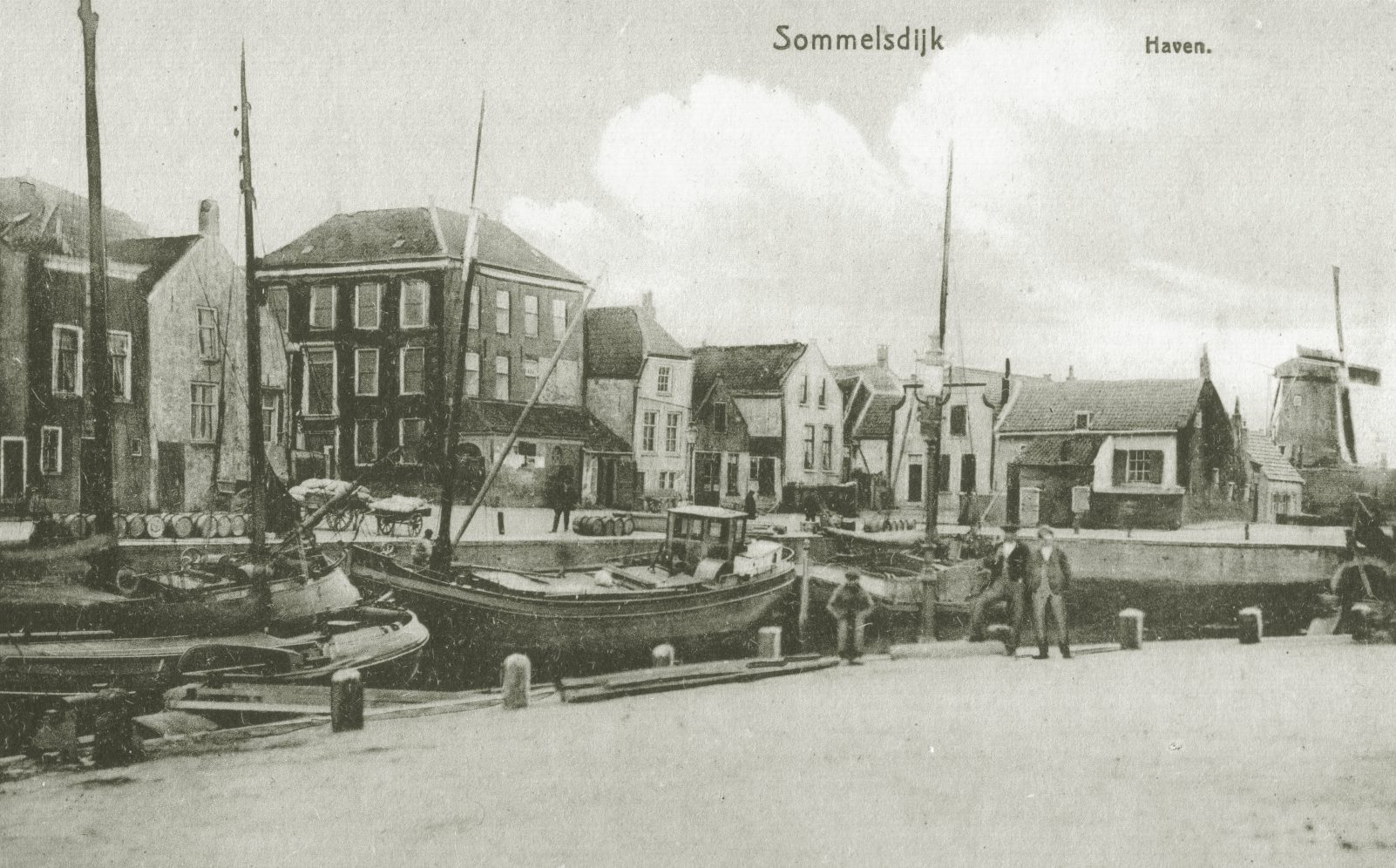
Old postcard of Sommelsdijk with harbour and mill

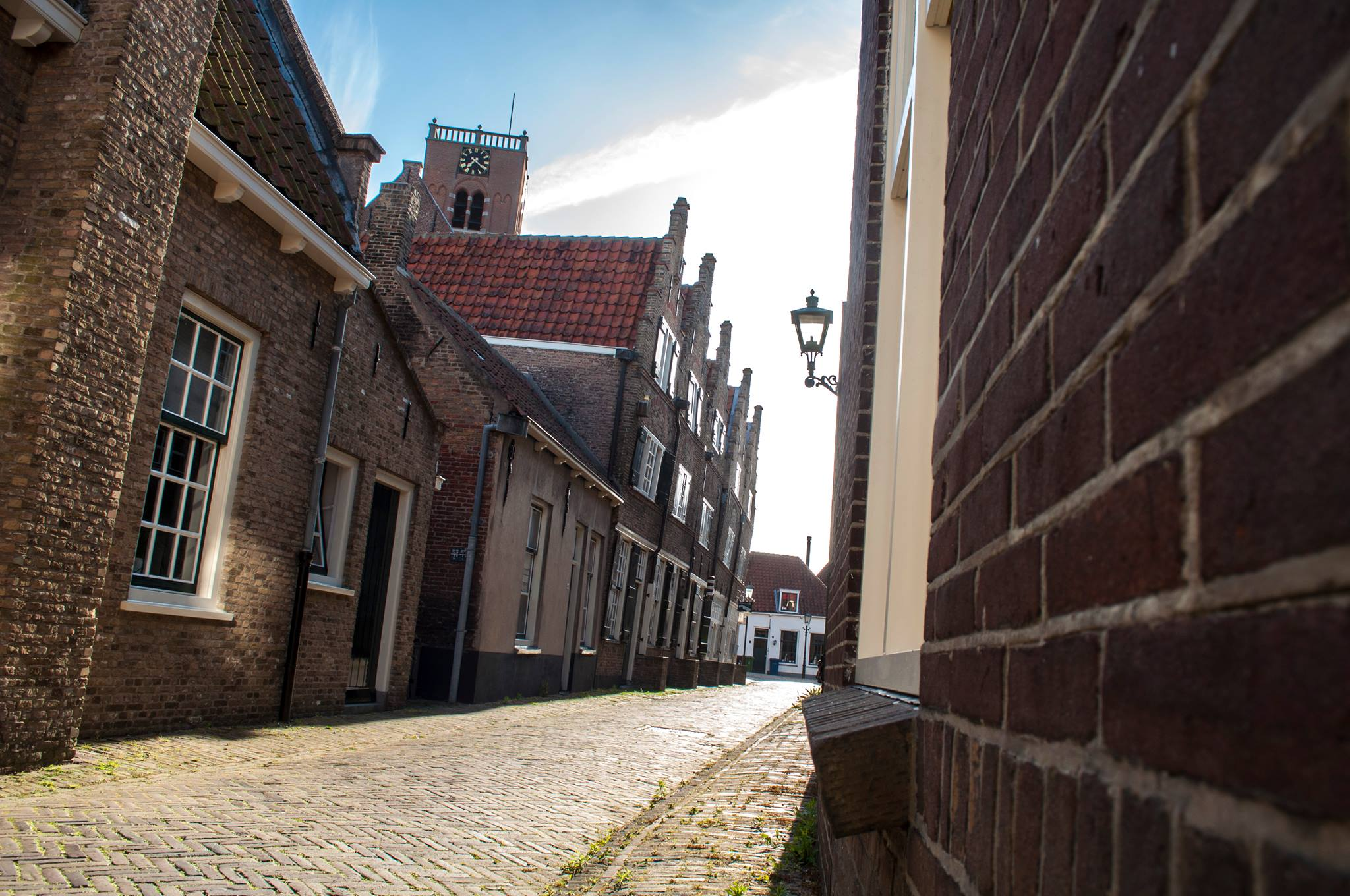
The Municipal Museum of Goeree-Overflakkee
