= Suriname-Rivier =

Historic lighthouse vessel

Coordinates: 5°53′23″N 55°05′29″W

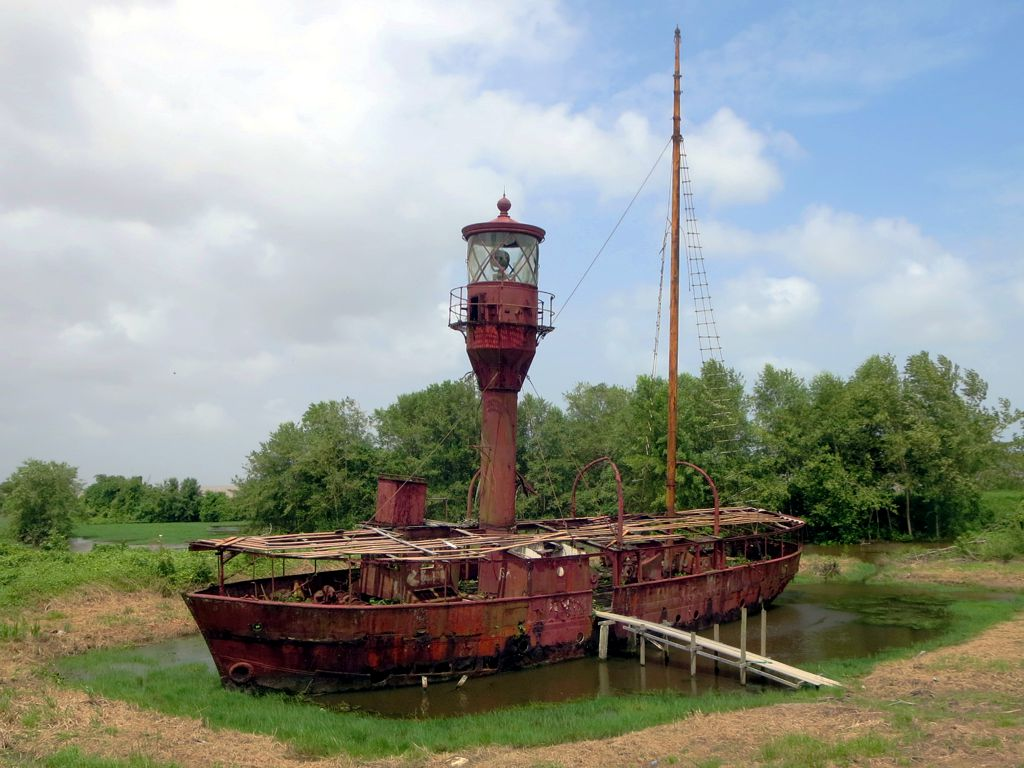
- Suriname-Rivier in Fort Nieuw-Amsterdam Museum in 2014

History

Netherlands
- Name: Suriname-Rivier
- Ordered: Ministry of the Colonies
- Builder: Conrad shipyard, Haarlem
- Launched: 1910
- In service: 1911
- Out of service: 1968 [1972]
- Homeport: Paramaribo
- Identification: ARLHS SUR-004M
- Status: Museum ship

General characteristics
- Type: Lightship
- Tonnage: 102.7 GRT
- Length: 24.85 m (81 ft 6 in) o/a
- Beam: 6.83 m (22 ft 5 in)
- Depth: 2 m (6 ft 7 in)
- Propulsion: none

Suriname-Rivier is a lightvessel permanently berthed in a wet dock in the Fort Nieuw-Amsterdam Open-Air Museum in Nieuw-Amsterdam, Commewijne, Suriname.

The lightvessel was constructed by the Conrad shipyard in Haarlem, the Netherlands, for the Ministry of the Colonies of the Netherlands. It was launched in 1910 and, not being equipped with engines, was sailed to Suriname by Captain Johannes Franciscus Wijsmuller (1876–1923) in 1911.

It was used to mark the mouth of the Suriname River.

The ship was replaced in 1968, decommissioned in 1972, and transferred to the Fort Nieuw-Amsterdam Open-Air Museum. Attempts to put the ship behind the local dikes at high tide resulted in a partial flooding of the village of Nieuw-Amsterdam.

By 2017, the lightvessel was in serious disrepair and in danger of being lost. At that time, the efforts of a Dutch foundation to raise money for restoring the ship had been unsuccessful.

== See also ==
- List of lighthouses in Suriname
