= Streekmuseum Goeree-Overflakkee =

Museum in the Netherlands

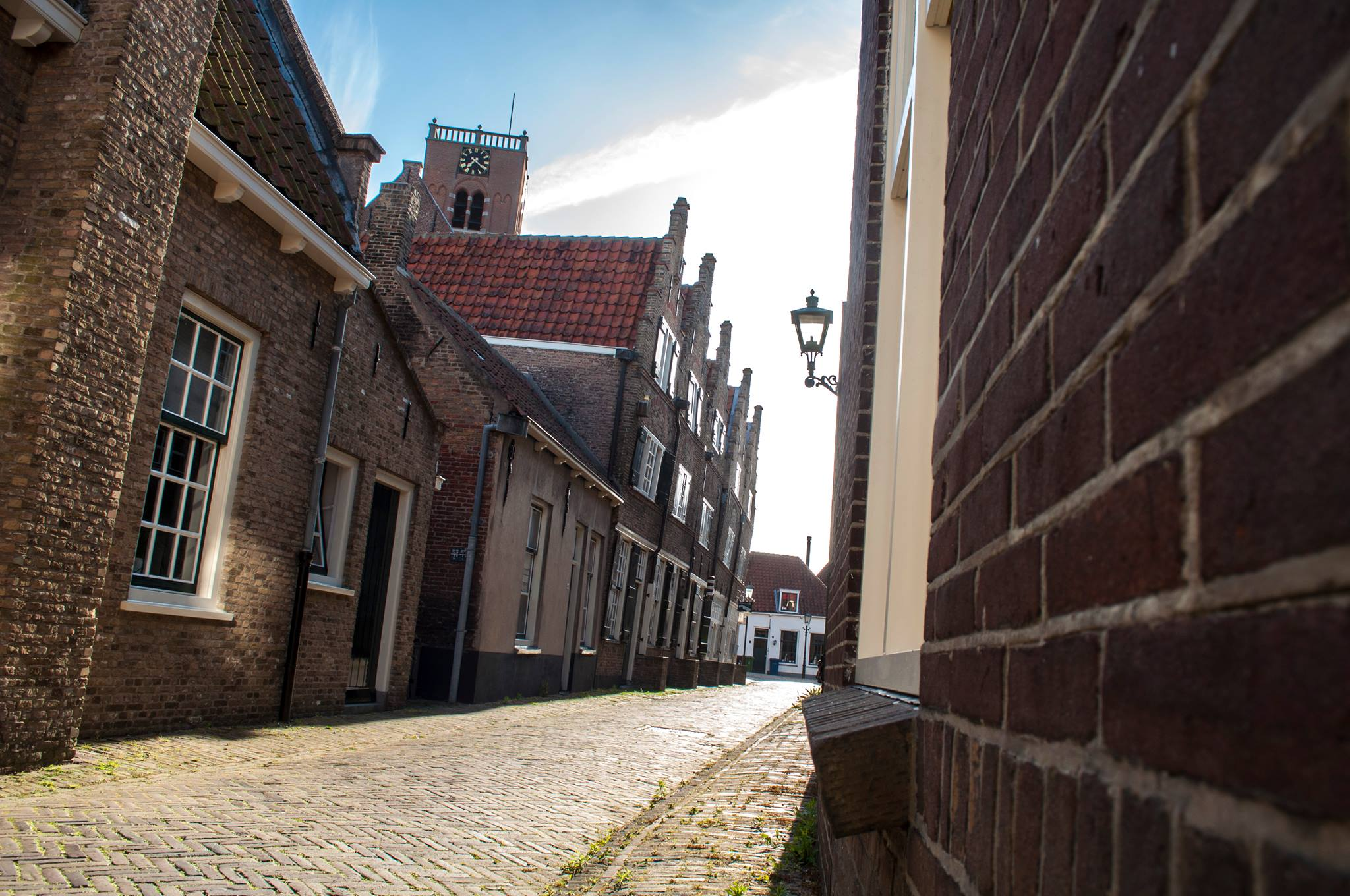
The Regional Museum of Goeree-Overflakkee

The Streekmuseum Goeree-Overflakkee (English: Regional Museum of Goeree-Overflakkee) is established in seven small houses dating back to the seventeenth century, in the old village of Sommelsdijk in the Netherlands. The buildings are inter-connected.

The museum is subdivided into nineteen sections and there is an annually changing exhibition. All aspects of life and work on the island of Goeree-Overflakkee are shown in a well-ordered way. The museum collection dates back to the first century A.D. The visitor will find a complete dwelling, grocery shop and school classroom A.D. 1900. The sections fishery and agriculture give an impression of the principal means of living in the past.

People may also take a glance at the workshops of a blacksmith, a cartwright, a clogmaker and a shoemaker. A photo-collection serves as a reminder of the ‘Watersnoodramp’, the disastrous flood of 1953, when hundreds of islanders drowned.
