= Fort Sommelsdijk =

Fort in Suriname

- Part of Suriname
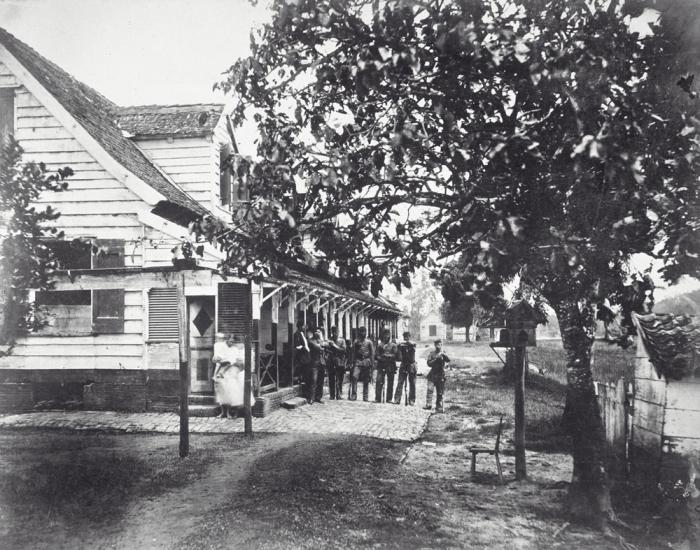
- Soldiers at Fort Sommelsdijk (1884)

Location
- Coordinates: 5.8590°N 54.8653°W

Site history
- Built: 1686
- Built by: Society of Suriname

Fort Sommelsdijk was a fort in Suriname built in 1686 at the confluence of the Commewijne and Cottica rivers. Later it was used as a mission post and hospital. In 1870, it lost its function and was only used a military outpost. In the 21st century, the fort was taken over by nature.

== History ==
In 1683, Cornelis van Aerssen van Sommelsdijck became the first Dutch governor of Suriname. He built a plantation near the confluence of the Commewijne and Cottica rivers. On 7 March 1685, the Court of Policy decided to build a fort at the location, and construction started in 1686. The fort was named after van Aerssen van Sommelsdijck.

On 10 October 1712, Jacques Cassard captured the Meerzorg plantation for France, and threatened Paramaribo across the Suriname River. The governor and the councillors fled to Sommelsdijk from where they negotiated a ransom for the colony. In 1715, it was decided to strengthen Sommeldijk.

In 1745, France threatened war on the Netherlands as part as of the War of the Austrian Succession, therefore, it was decided to build Fort Nieuw-Amsterdam at the confluence of the Suriname and the Commewijne River in order to better protect the plantations. In 1748, it was decided to abandoned Sommelsdijk as a fort, and only use it as a military outpost.

In 1785, the Moravian Church received permission to reuse the fort as a missionary post. In 1789, a hospital was established at the location. The mission post was abandoned in 1818, and the hospital closed in 1870.
