= Paulus van der Veen =

Dutch Governor of Suriname (1696-1706)

Paul van der Veen

Governor of Suriname
- In office 1696–1706
- Preceded by: Laurens Verboom
- Succeeded by: Johan van Scharphuizen

Personal details
- Born: Paul van der Veen Does c.1660 Gorcum, Netherlands
- Died: 16 August 1733

Paul van der Veen Does (c. 1660 - 16 August 1733, Gorcum) was from 1696 to 1706 governor of Surinam, succeeding Johan van Scharphuizen. The next twenty-five years, until his death, he was a member of the board of the Society of Surinam.

He was the son of Balthasar van der Veen and Susanna Pels. His uncle was Andries Pels, a rich Amsterdam banker and insurer. He married Anna van Gelre, a mayor's daughter from Zierikzee. His brother-in-law was Andries Boxel.
