= Cornelis van Aerssen van Sommelsdijck =

Dutch governor of Surinam in XVII century

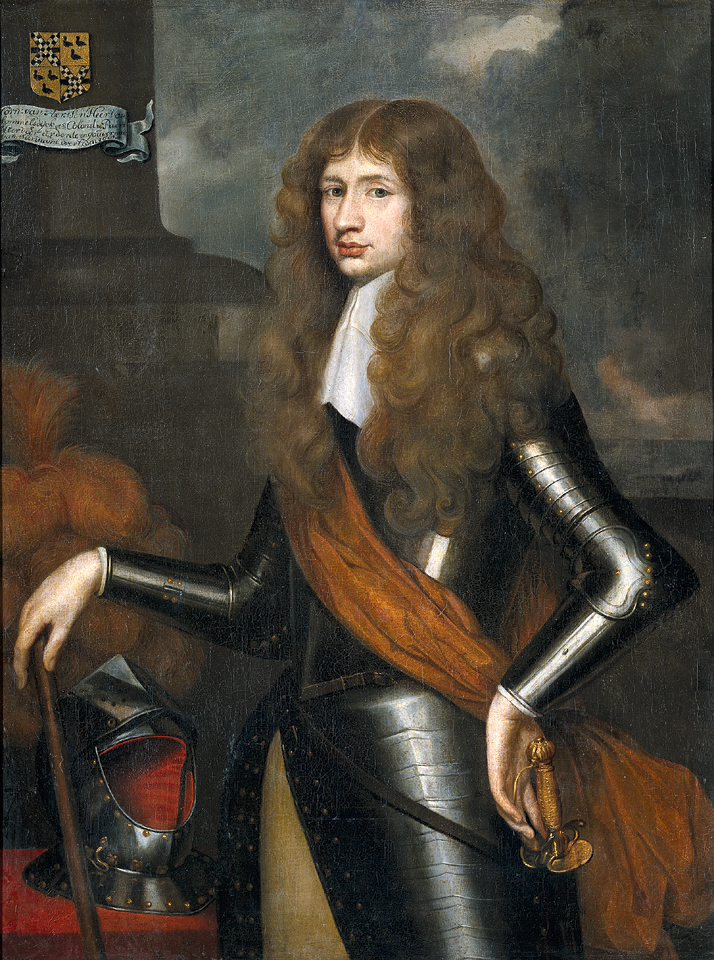
- Cornelis van Aerssen van Sommelsdijck (ca.1680)

Governor of Suriname
- In office 27 November 1683 – 19 July 1688
- Preceded by: Laurens Verboom
- Succeeded by: Johan van Scharphuizen

Personal details
- Born: 20 August 1637; The Hague, Netherlands
- Died: 19 July 1688 (aged 50); Paramaribo, Suriname

Cornelis van Aerssen van Sommelsdijck (also: Sommelsdijk) (The Hague, 20 August 1637 - Paramaribo, 19 July 1688) was the first governor of Suriname after the establishment of the Society of Suriname in 1683. He was governor from 27 November 1683 until he was murdered by mutinous soldiers on 19 July 1688. Van Aerssen belonged to one of the richest families of the Dutch Golden Age.

== Biography ==
Van Aerssen van Sommelsdijck was Lord of Sommelsdijk, Plaat, Bommel, and Spijk. Through his French wife Margaret, he was Marquis of Saint André Montbrun and Ferrassières.

He was the fourth generation of a line active in Dutch politics. After a political career in the Netherlands, in 1683 he became tired of Dutch public affairs. Accordingly, he acquired a one-third share of the Society of Suriname, the other shareholders being the Dutch West India Company and the city of Amsterdam. At that time Suriname was a very small colony.

Van Aerssen van Sommelsdijck arrived in Paramaribo on 27 November 1683, and discovered a neglected colony. He started to encourage French Huguenots and Labadists to settle and start plantations in Suriname. In 1686, he made peace with the Amerindians tribes.

In order to develop Suriname, he brought in 300 soldiers. The drunken and disorderly conduct of the soldiers was not appreciated by van Aerssen van Sommelsdijck who started to impose strict laws on the soldiers. The soldiers started to complain about their pay and rations. On 19 July 1688, a mutiny started, twenty soldiers advanced to his house, and shot Van Sommelsdijck and his assistant Laurens Verboom.

During his lifetime, he was rumoured to be one of the richest people of Amsterdam. After his death, it was revealed that he had immense debts.
