= Dirk Valkenburg =

Dutch painter (1675–1721)

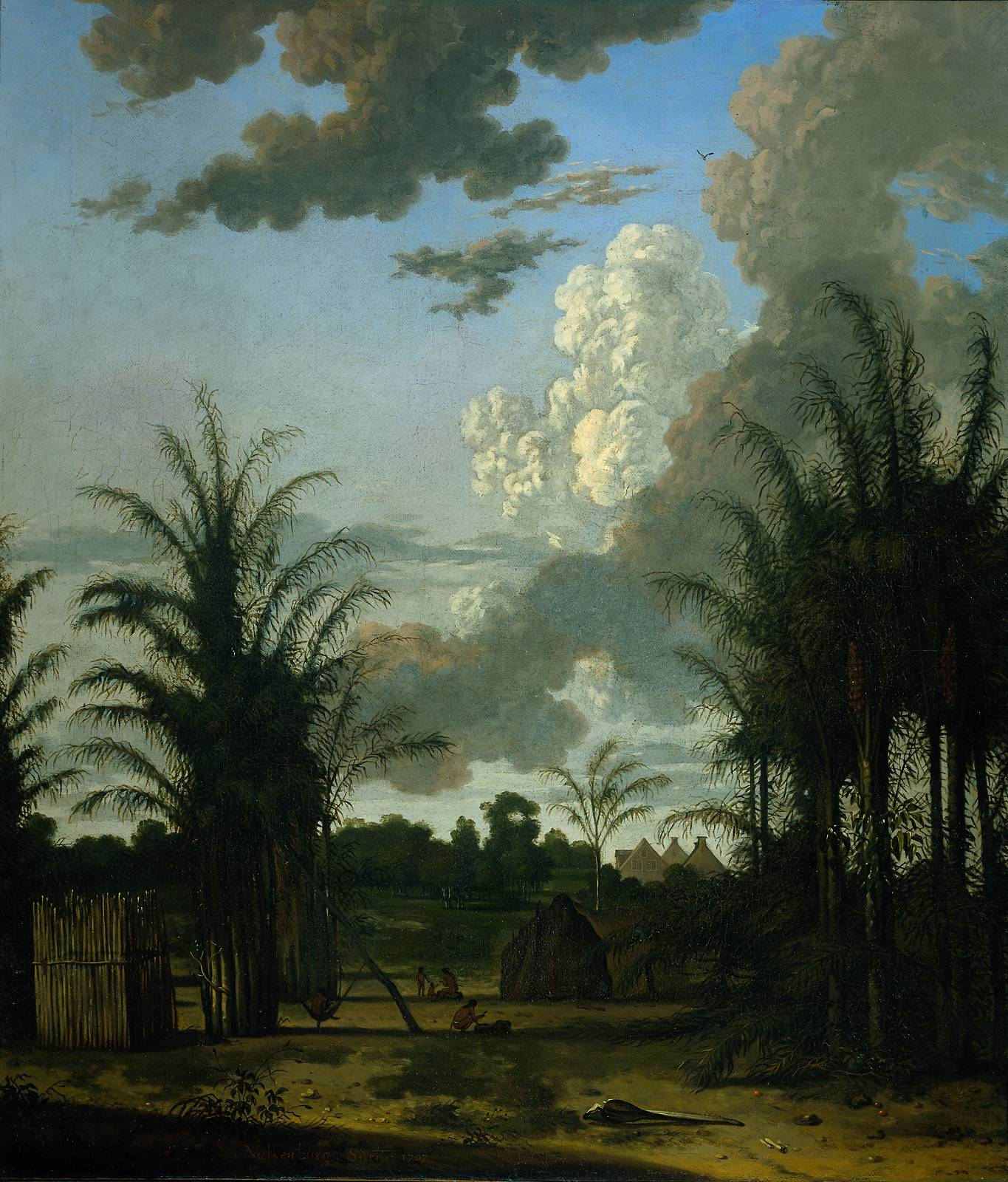
A plantation in Surinam.

Dirk Valkenburg (1675, in Amsterdam – 1721, in Amsterdam) was a painter of the Dutch Golden Age.

According to the RKD he was a pupil of Michiel van Musscher, Herman van Vollenhove, and Jan Weenix. In 1698 he worked in Vienna for the Prince of Liechtenstein, and from 1706-1707 he travelled to Suriname to draw the native plants and birds for the wealthy city secretary of Amsterdam, Jonas Witsen, who owned a plantation there and whom he met through his teacher Musscher.

He is known for exotic landscapes, paintings of birds, and fruit and flower still lifes.

Since 2010 Dutch artist Willem de Rooij has been working on the first monographic publication on the life and work of Dirk Valkenburgh.
