= Society of Suriname =

Dutch private company

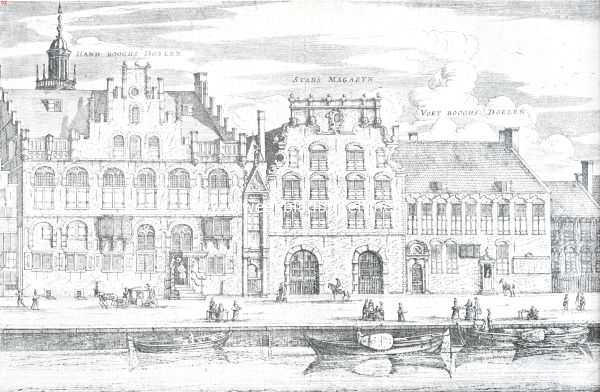
The Society of Suriname met temporarily in the Voetboogdoelen. The building (third from left) was rented in 1674 by the WIC and is sometimes known as the Westindisch Binnenhuis.

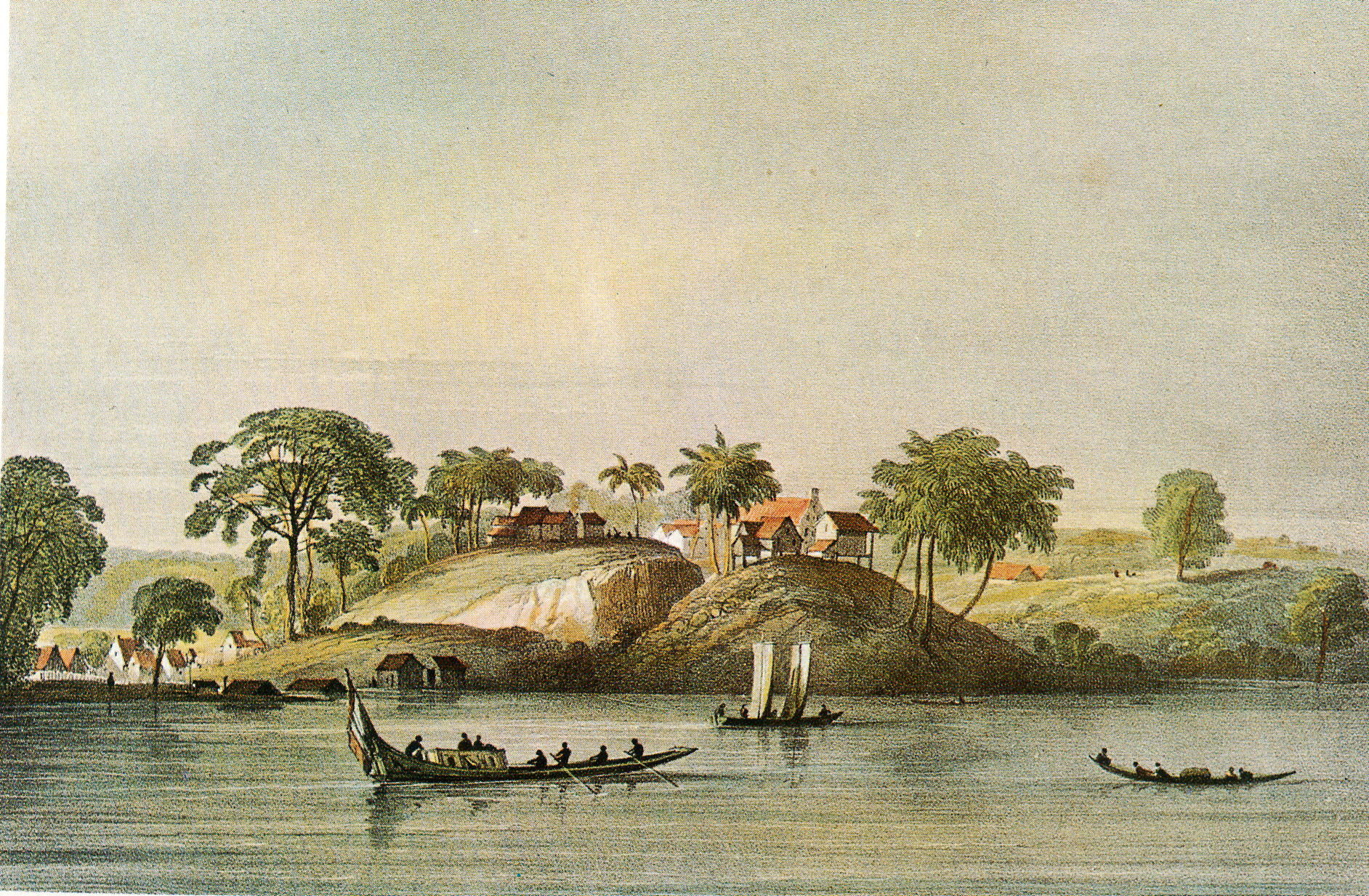
The Jodensavanne

The Society of Suriname (Dutch: Sociëteit van Suriname) was a Dutch private company, modelled on the ideas of Jean-Baptiste Colbert and set up on 21 May 1683 to profit from the management and defense of the Dutch Republic's colony of Suriname. It had three participants, with equal shares in the costs and benefits of the society: the city of Amsterdam, the family Van Aerssen van Sommelsdijck, and the Dutch West India Company. Only through mutual consent could these shareholders withdraw from the society.

Although the organization and administration of the colony was limited to these three shareholders, all citizens of the Dutch Republic were free to trade with Suriname. Also, the planters were consulted in a Council of Police, which was a unique feature among the colonies of Guyana.

Its governors included Cornelis van Aerssen van Sommelsdijck, Johan van Scharphuizen, and Paulus van der Veen.

The Society was nationalized by the Batavian Republic in November 1795, as the Patriottentijd deemed the governing of colonies by chartered companies a thing of the past.

== See also ==
- List of colonial governors of Suriname
- List of trading companies
- Jeronimo Clifford
- Society of Berbice

== Sources ==
- (in Dutch) Aa, A.J. Beknopt Aardrijkskundig Woordenboek der Nederlanden, Gorinchem 1851–'54.
- (in Dutch) Winter, P.J. van (1987) De Westindische Compagnie ter kamer Stad en Lande, p. 201–4, 217.
