= Surinam (Dutch colony) =

Dutch colony in the Guianas (1667–1954)

Colony of Surinam Kolonie Suriname
- 1667–1954
- Flag Coat of arms
- Anthem: "Wilhelmus van Nassouwe" (Dutch) "'William of Nassau"
- Suriname in 1954
- Status: Colony of the Dutch Republic (1667–1795); Colony of the Batavian Republic (1795–1799, 1802–1804); Occupied territory of the United Kingdom (1799–1802, 1804–1815); Colony of the Netherlands (1815–1954)
- Capital: Paramaribo
- Common languages: Dutch (official) 11 other languages: Sranan Tongo; Sarnami Hindustani; Javanese; Ndyuka; Saramaccan; Kwinti; Chinese; English; Portuguese; French; Spanish; 8 native languages: Akurio; Arawak-Lokono; Carib-Kari'nja; Sikiana-Kashuyana; Tiro-Tiriyó; Waiwai; Warao; Wayana
- Head of state
  - 1667–1702: Willem III (first)
  - 1948–1954: Juliana (last)
- Governor General
  - 1667: Maurits de Rama (first)
  - 1689–1696: Johan van Scharphuizen
  - 1949–1954: Jan Klaasesz
- History
  - Capture of Surinam: 26 February 1667
  - Treaty of Breda: 31 July 1667
  - Proclamation of the Charter for the Kingdom of the Netherlands: 15 December 1954
- Currency: Dutch guilder, Spanish dollar
Preceded by	Succeeded by
Surinam (English colony)	Suriname (Kingdom of the Netherlands)
- Today part of: Suriname

Surinam (Dutch: Suriname), also unofficially known as Dutch Guiana, was a Dutch plantation colony in the Guianas and the predecessor polity of the modern country of Suriname. It was bordered by the fellow Dutch colony of Berbice to the west, and the French colony of Cayenne to the east. It later bordered British Guiana (modern-day Guyana) from 1831 to 1966.

== History ==
=== Colonisation ===
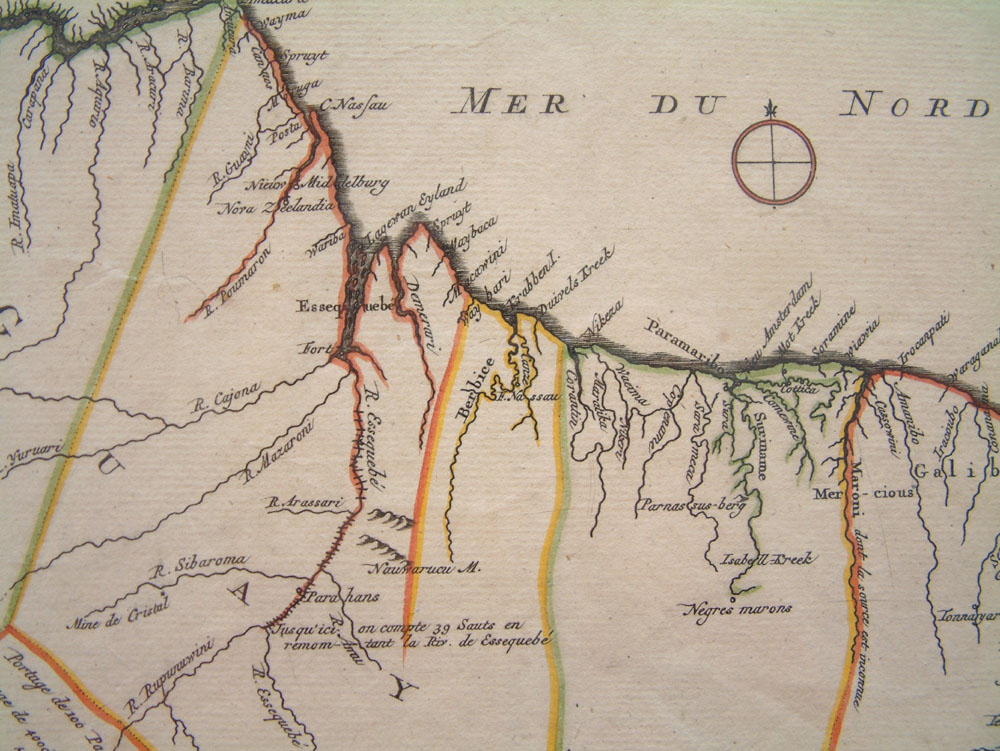
Map of the Guianas from 1700

Surinam was a Dutch colony from 26 February 1667, when Dutch forces captured Francis Willoughby's English colony during the Second Anglo-Dutch War, until 15 December 1954, when Surinam became a constituent country of the Kingdom of the Netherlands. The status quo of Dutch sovereignty over Surinam, and English sovereignty over New Netherland, which it had conquered in 1664, was kept in the Treaty of Breda of 31 July 1667, and again confirmed in the Treaty of Westminster of 1674.

After the other Dutch colonies in the Guianas, i.e., Berbice, Essequibo, Demerara, and Pomeroon, were lost to the British in 1814, the remaining colony of Surinam was often referred to as Dutch Guiana, especially after 1831, when the British merged Berbice, Essequibo, and Demerara into British Guiana. As the term Dutch Guiana was used in the 17th and 18th centuries to refer to all Dutch colonies in the Guianas, this use of the term can be confusing (see below).

=== Dutch Guiana ===
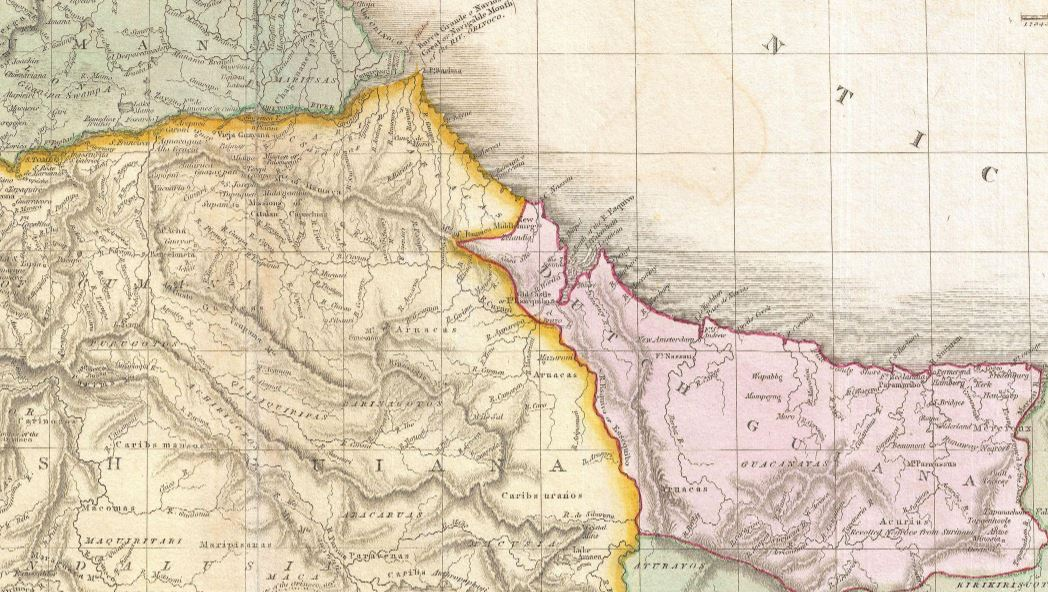
Dutch Guiana map (1818)

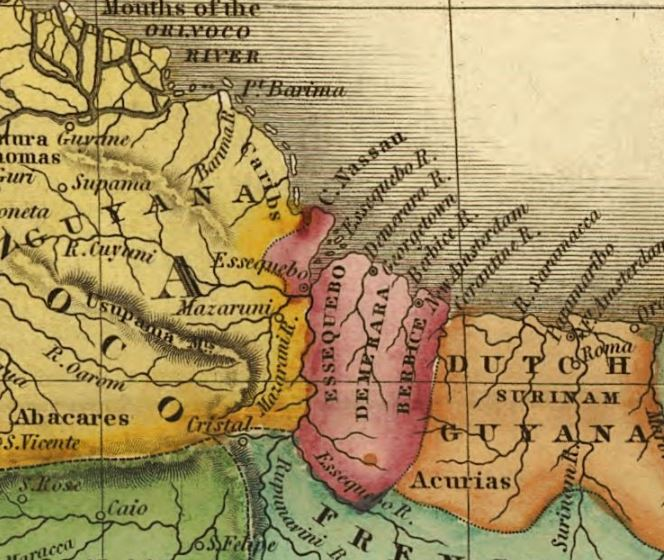
Dutch Guiana map (1826)

Although the colony has always been officially known as Surinam or Suriname, in both Dutch (Note: See for example this royal decree separating Suriname from Curaçao and Dependencies (1845).) and English, (Note: In treaties between the Netherlands and the United Kingdom, the colony is consistently referred to as the Colony of Surinam, e.g. Convention between Great Britain and the Netherlands (Anglo-Dutch Treaties of 1870–1871), relative to the Emigration of Labourers from India to the Dutch Colony of Surinam, the Accession of the Dutch colonies of Curaçao and Surinam to the International Union for the Protection of Industrial Property. And "SWISS NOTIFICATION of the Accession of the Dutch Colonies of Curaçao and Surinam to the International Convention of 20 March 1883, for the Protection of Industrial Property.-Berne, 28 February 1890.") the colony was often unofficially and semi-officially referred to as Dutch Guiana (Dutch: Nederlands Guiana) in the 19th and 20th century, in an analogy to British Guiana and French Guiana. Historically, Suriname was only one of many Dutch colonies in the Guianas, others being Berbice, Essequibo, Demerara, and Pomeroon, which after being taken over by the United Kingdom in 1814, were united into British Guiana in 1831. The Dutch also controlled northern Brazil from 1630 to 1654, including the area that, when governed by Lisbon, was called Portuguese Guiana. Thus, before 1814, the term Dutch Guiana described not only Suriname, but all the colonies under Dutch sovereignty in the region taken together: a set of polities, with distinct governments, whose external borders changed much over time.

=== Slave labour ===
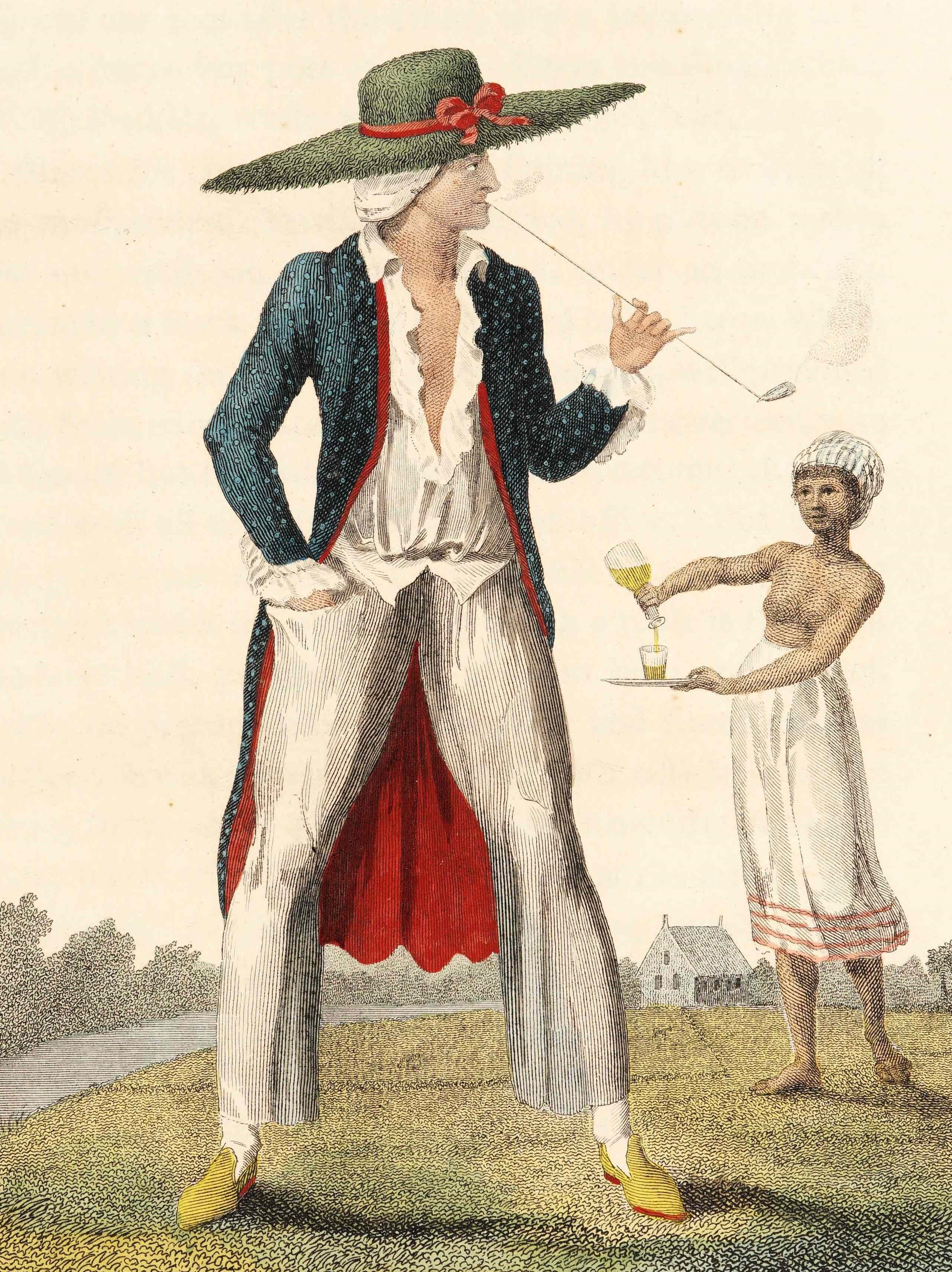
An illustration of a Dutch plantation owner and slave from William Blake's illustrations of the work of John Gabriel Stedman, first published in 1792–1794

The economy of the Colony of Suriname depended upon people enslaved at its plantations. Slave labour was mostly supplied by the Dutch West India Company (WIC) from its trading posts in West Africa, to produce their crops. Sugar, cotton, and indigo were the main goods exported from the colony to the Netherlands until the early 18th century, when coffee became the single most important export product of Surinam. Planters' treatment of the slaves was notoriously bad. The historian C.R. Boxer wrote that "man's inhumanity to man just about reached its limits in Surinam", and many slaves escaped the plantations.

The Amsterdam Stock Exchange crashed in 1773, which dealt a severe blow to the plantation economy that was further exacerbated by the British abolition of the slave trade in 1807. This abolition was adopted in the colonies of the Netherlands by King William I, who signed a royal decree in this regard in June 1814, and who concluded the Anglo-Dutch Slave Trade Treaty in May 1818. Many plantations went bankrupt as a consequence of the abolition of slave trade. Without supply of slaves, many plantations were merged to increase efficiency.

=== Abolition of slavery ===
Slavery was eventually abolished on 1 July 1863, a date now celebrated as the public holiday of Ketikoti, although slaves were only released after a ten-year transitory period in 1873. This spurred the immigration of indentured labourers from British India, after a treaty to that effect had been signed between the Netherlands and the United Kingdom in 1870. Javanese and Chinese workers from the Dutch East Indies were also contracted to work on plantations in Surinam. These new immigrant group were referred to by the now-derogatory term coolies (Dutch: koelies). There were rebellions against the wages and tasks given to these indentured labourers, such as by Janey Tetary in 1884. At the same time, a largely unsuccessful attempt to colonise Surinam with impoverished farmers from the Netherlands was started as well.

=== 20th century: natural resources ===
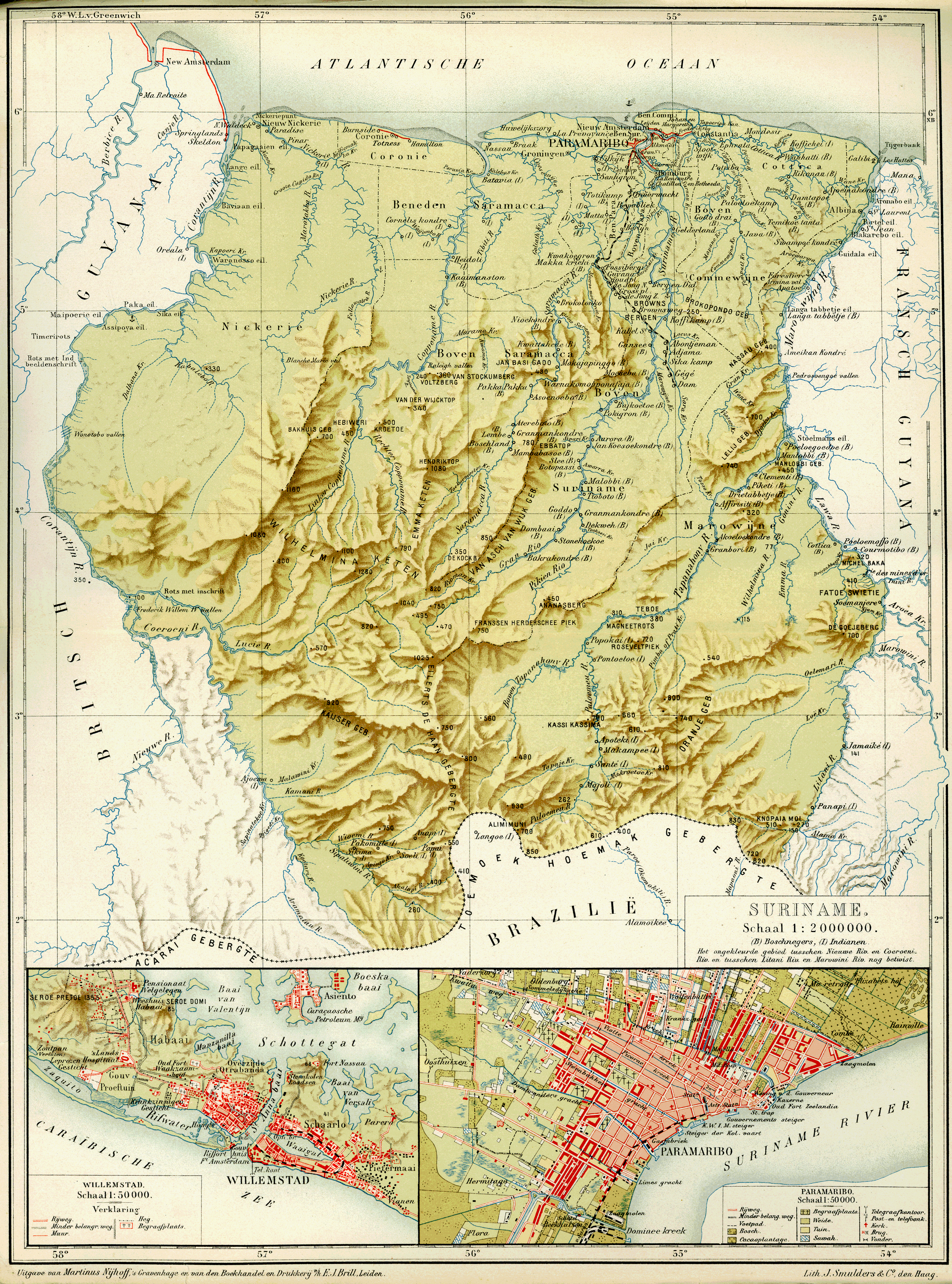
Suriname map (circa 1914) in the Encyclopaedia of the Dutch West Indies, by Surinamese cartographer Herman Benjamins and Dutch ethnographer Johannes Snelleman.

In the 20th century, the natural resources of Surinam, which include rubber, gold, and bauxite, were exploited. The gold rush that followed the discovery of gold on the banks of the Lawa River spurred the construction of the Lawa Railway in 1902, although construction was halted after gold production proved disappointing. In the 1930s, the grandmother of Hennah Draaibaar discovered more than 80 kilos of gold, which made her briefly the richest woman in Surinam; the Dutch took most of the gold to the Netherlands.

In 1916, the U.S. aluminium company Alcoa began mining bauxite on the banks of the Cottica River, near the village of Moengo. In 1938, the company built an aluminium smelter in Paranam.

The 1930s were a difficult time for Suriname. The Great Depression created great unemployment. Surinamese guest workers in Curaçao and other islands of the Netherlands Antilles returned to Suriname because there was no more work, which exacerbated the problem. No more funds came in and more unemployed people were added. To provide work, roads were built to Domburg and Groningen, and the Meursweg was constructed. The Salvation Army set up a soup kitchen to relieve the worst of necessities. However, this was not enough, and there was a great deal of unrest among the population in 1931, leading to demonstrations and street riots with looting. Nationalist Anton de Kom then came to Suriname to set up a workers' organisation there: he established a consultancy firm, but when he organised a demonstration against governor Johannes Kielstra, he was imprisoned. A rally to get him released led to Black Tuesday, in which 2 people were shot. De Kom was then put on a boat to the Netherlands. The Dutch Prime Minister Colijn stated in the Lower House in 1935:

Everything that has been tried in Suriname, it all simply failed. Things are not easy. And that is why I wanted someone to get up in the Netherlands who knew what could be done. I will do the possible.

==== Second World War ====
However, the situation had improved somewhat on the eve of the Second World War. The Dutch presence in the Caribbean and South America was minimal. The Netherlands West Indies included the possessions of the Dutch Caribbean; Aruba, Bonaire, Curaçao, Saba, Sint Eustatius, and Sint Maarten, which are still part of the Kingdom of the Netherlands today. Just to the south lay the other part of the Dutch colony of the West Indies; Surinam.

Similar to the First World War, the government of the Netherlands intended to stay neutral in the Second World War. However, on 4 May 1940, Nazi-Germany broke its promise, and annexed and occupied the European Netherlands until it was liberated on 5 May 1945. The Dutch government and Royal family continued their duties in-exile from the United Kingdom and Canada. The government-in-exile was soon faced with a dilemma. After France had been defeated, the Vichy French government came to power and proposed to Adolf Hitler a policy of collaboration. That led to a conflict between Prime Minister Dirk Jan de Geer and the Queen Wilhelmina. De Geer wanted to return to the Netherlands and collaborate as well. The Queen dismissed De Geer as prime minister and replaced him with Pieter Sjoerds Gerbrandy, who worked with the Allied forces towards a liberation plan for the Netherlands instead of collaboration with the Nazi-occupier.

During the annexation of the European Netherlands, the Dutch West Indies was only defended by local police and militia. The only Dutch naval vessel stationed there was the sloop HNLMS Van Kinsbergen. The Dutch government-in-exile also had a large merchant fleet at its disposal, which could be used to help the alliance. Surinam was protected by a single 200-strong company of army infantry, supplemented by a militia rifle company and an old station ship. Aruba and Curaçao were home to important oil refineries, therefore the two islands were placed under British protection on 10 May 1940. Surinam was one of the most important bauxite (for aluminium) suppliers, which was vital to the allied war airplane industry. In September 1941, US President Franklin D. Roosevelt offered his troops to help protect the colony. In November 1941, the first 1,000 US troops arrived in Paramaribo. In 1942, protection of Aruba and Curaçao was transferred from the UK to the US.

In 1942 funding was made available in Surinam for coastal artillery and conscription. Conscripted soldiers in Surinam and the West Indies formed national guard units, the Schutterij. Hundreds of conscripts served as anti-aircraft gunners on merchant and navy vessels during the war, of whom dozens were killed. Volunteers joined the Dutch: Burgerwacht, lit. 'Civic Guard' in the West Indies and the Dutch: Stad en Landwacht, lit. 'City and Country Guard' in Surinam. By then a Dutch motor whaleboat patrolled Aruba, while Curaçao was defended by several light craft. The latter were detached for use as convoy escorts in July 1942.

Under the provisions of the Allied Atlantic Charter of August 1941, the Dutch government-in-exile promised to end the colonial relations between the Netherlands and its overseas territories in the West Indies, promising them far-reaching autonomy and self-rule. This was eventually accomplished by the proclamation of the Charter for the Kingdom of the Netherlands on 15 December 1954, which constituted a Kingdom in which the Netherlands, the Netherlands Antilles, and Suriname participated on a basis of equality. In 1975, Suriname left the Kingdom of the Netherlands to become the independent country of Suriname.

== Administration ==
From 1683, the colony was governed by the Society of Suriname, a company composed of three equal shareholders, being the city of Amsterdam, the family Van Aerssen van Sommelsdijck, and the Dutch West India Company (WIC). Although the organisation and administration was of the colony was limited to these three shareholders, all citizens of the Dutch Republic were free to trade with Suriname. Also, the planters were consulted in a Council of Police, which was a unique feature among the colonies of Guiana.

In November 1795, the Society was nationalised by the Batavian Republic. From then on until 1954, the Batavian Republic and its legal successors (the Kingdom of Holland and the Kingdom of the Netherlands) governed the territory as a national colony, barring a period of British occupation between 1799 and 1802, and between 1804 and 1816. In 1828, Surinam was united with the colonies of Curaçao and Sint Eustatius in an attempt to increase administrative efficiency. However, due to the distance between these territories, in 1845 the islands were separated as the Colony of Curaçao.

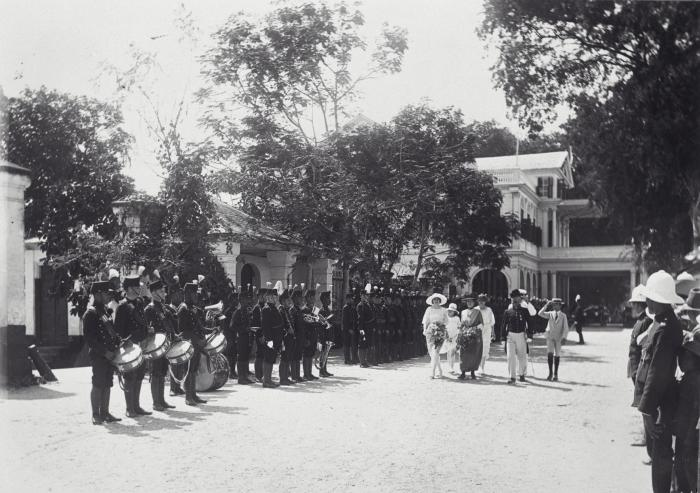
Baron Aarnoud van Heemstra, the Governor of Suriname (1923)

After the Batavian Republic took over in 1795, the Dutch government issued various government regulations for Suriname (Dutch: Regeringsreglementen voor Suriname), establishing the government of the colony. In 1865, a new government regulation replaced the previous regulation of 1832, which theoretically gave Suriname some limited self-rule. The colonial elite was given the right to elect a Colonial Council (Koloniale Raad) which would co-govern the colony together with the Governor-General appointed by the Dutch crown. Among others, the Colonial Council was allowed to decide over the colony's budget, which was subject to approval by the Dutch crown, but which did not see any involvement of Dutch parliament.

In the wake of the 1922 Dutch constitutional revision, in which the term "colony" was replaced by "overseas territory", the 1865 government regulation was replaced by the Staatsregeling van Suriname, 'Basic Law of Suriname' on 1 April 1937. This Basic Law renamed the Staten van Suriname, 'Colonial Council to Estates of Suriname' and increased the membership from 13 to 15.

Flag of Suriname (1959–1975)

After the Second World War, during which the Dutch government-in-exile had pledged the Allied Atlantic Charter in August 1941 to review the relationship between the Netherlands and its colonies, the Basic Law was heavily revised. In March 1948, revisions to the Basic Law were adopted by Dutch parliament, which introduced universal suffrage for both men and women, which increased the membership of the Estates from 15 to 21, and which introduced a College van Algemeen Bestuur, 'Board of General Government', which was to assist the Governor in the everyday government of the colony, and which was the precursor to the Cabinet of Ministers. The new constitution took effect in July 1948. On 15 December 1954, by the Charter for the Kingdom of the Netherlands, the Kingdom was transformed to the modern format in which the Netherlands, the Netherlands Antilles, and Suriname act as equal countries members. Suriname left the Kingdom of the Netherlands to become the independent country of Suriname in 1975.

== Military ==
In 1868 the Dutch government created the Netherlands Armed Forces in Suriname (TRIS) which served as the Dutch colonial army in Suriname. This meant that like the Royal Netherlands East Indies Army (KNIL) in the Dutch East Indies, TRIS fell under the responsibility of the Dutch Ministry of Colonies, instead of the Dutch Ministry of Defence, two infantry and two artillery companies. In total 636 soldiers served in the TRIS army. These soldiers were tasked with patrolling and policing duties within the Dutch colony of Surinam.

== See also ==
- Willem III
- Amsterdam
- Dutch East Indies
- Saba
- Poenale sanctie

== Sources ==
- Bakker, Eveline (1993). Geschiedenis van Suriname: van stam tot staat. Zutphen: Walburg Pers. ISBN 9789060118375.
- Buddingh', Hans (1999). Geschiedenis van Suriname. Zutphen: Het Spectrum. ISBN 9789046811726.
- Hartsinck, Jan Jacob (1770), Beschryving van Guiana, of de wilde kust in Zuid-America, Amsterdam: Gerrit Tielenburg
- Morison, Samuel Eliot (2001). History of United States Naval Operations in World War II: The Battle of the Atlantic, September 1939 – May 1943 (illus., repr. ed.). University of Illinois Press. ISBN 978-0-252-06963-5.
- Oostindie, Gert (2005). Paradise overseas: the Dutch Caribbean: colonialism and its transatlantic legacies. Oxford: Macmillan Caribbean. ISBN 1405057130.
