= List of football stadiums in Suriname =

The following is a list of football stadiums in Suriname, ordered by capacity.

== Current stadiums ==
#	Image	Stadium	Capacity	City	District	Home team(s)	Opened
1		André Kamperveen Stadion	7,100	Paramaribo	Paramaribo	Suriname national team & Transvaal	1953
2		Dr. Ir. Franklin Essed Stadion	3,500	Paramaribo	Paramaribo	Cosmos, Leo Victor, Robinhood, Royal '95, SNL, Super Red Eagles & Walking Boyz Company	1958
3		Clarence Seedorf Stadion	3,500	Oost	Para	Suriprofs & The Brothers	2001
4		Asraf Peerkhan Stadion	3,400	Nieuw Nickerie	Nickerie	Prakash, PSV, Santos & Zeedijk	1933
5		Mgr. Aloysius Zichem Sportcentrum	3,100	Paramaribo	Paramaribo	PVV	1961
6		Ronnie Brunswijkstadion	3,000	Moengo	Marowijne	Inter Moengotapoe	2002
7		George W. Streepy Stadion	3,000	Paramaribo	Paramaribo	SVB Junior League (youth teams)	1966
8		Eddy Blackman Stadion	2,000	Livorno	Paramaribo	Jai Hanuman, Kamal Dewaker & Takdier Boys	????
9		Moengo Stadion	2,000	Moengo	Marowijne	Notch	????
10		Nacionello Stadion	1,500	Houttuin	Wanica	Nacional Deva Boys	????
11		Voorwaartsveld	1,500	Paramaribo	Paramaribo	Voorwaarts	????
12		Bigi Wey Sports Center	1,300	Brownsweg	Brokopondo	ACoconut & Tahitie FC	2012
13		George Deul Complex	1,000	Hannaslust	Wanica	Wanhattie & Young Rhythm	????
14		Letitia Vriesde Sportcomplex	1,000	Totness	Coronie	Coronie Boys & West United	????
15		Meerzorg Stadion	1,000	Meerzorg	Commewijne	Excelsior & Nishan 42	????
16		J. Eliazer Stadion	1,000	Groningen	Saramacca	Boskamp & Real Saramacca	1949
17		Bomastar Sportscomplex	1,000	Lelydorp	Wanica	Bomastar	????
18		Emiel Briel Stadion	1,000	Lelydorp	Wanica	S.V. Jong Rambaan	????
19		Albina Stadion	1,000	Albina	Marowijne	S.V. Papatam	

== See also ==
- List of football clubs in Suriname
- List of South American stadiums by capacity
- List of association football stadiums by capacity
- Lists of stadiums
