= List of football clubs in Suriname =

This is a list of football clubs in Suriname.

Teams are listed according to the league in which they currently play.

== Suriname Major League (2024) ==
- S.V. Notch
- PVV
- S.V. Transvaal
- S.V. Voorwaarts
- S.V. Robinhood
- Inter Moengotapoe
- Flora FC
- N.V. Dash F.C. Inter Wanica
- S.V. Broki
- S.V. Leo Victor

== SVB Eerste Divisie (2016/17) ==
- Botopasi (Botopasi)
- Inter Moengotapoe (Moengo)
- PVV (Paramaribo)
- SNL (Paramaribo)
- Leo Victor (Paramaribo)
- Nishan 42 (Meerzorg)
- Notch (Moengo)
- Robinhood (Paramaribo)
- Jong Rambaan (Lelydorp)
- Transvaal (Paramaribo)
- Voorwaarts (Paramaribo)
- Walking Boyz Company (Paramaribo)

== SVB Tweede Divisie (2016/17) ==
- ACoconut (Brokopondo)
- Bomastar (Lelydorp)
- Caravan (Livorno)
- Flora (Paramaribo)
- Papatam (Albina)
- T.O.K. FC (Paramaribo)
- Santos (Nieuw Nickerie)
- Slee Juniors FC
- Tahitie (Brownsweg)
- West United (Totness)

== SVB Derde Divisie (2016/17) ==
=== Regio Midden ===
- Bintang Baru
- Flamingo
- FTN
- Parana
- Real Leiding
- SCV
- SV Sunny Point
- SVW

=== Regio Noord ===
- Broki
- Jong Aurora
- Paraguay
- Sophia

=== Regio Oost ===
- Tamansari
- Happy Boys
- SK. Commewijne
- K. Commewijne
- Real Bergi
- High School
- Super Adjoema
- Compleet

=== Regio West ===
- Inter Boskamp
- Groningen
- Real Coronie
- Jai Hanuman
- De Ster
- Coronie Boys
- Bintang Merah football team
- Vitesse

=== Regio Zuid ===
- Tramos
- kitha
- OSV
- Ghana

== Former Surinamese league teams ==
- Olympia (of Paramaribo, founded in 1919) were the first official champions of Suriname in 1923 having won a total of 2 national titles.
- Ajax (of Paramaribo, founded in 1921) won 3 national titles before the club folded in the sixties.
- Fearless (of Moengo, founded in 1925) won the district championship on several occasions prior to dissolution.
- MYOB (of Paramaribo, founded in 1927) was renamed Remo in 1950.
- Cicerone (of Paramaribo, founded in 1929) won 4 national titles before ceasing operations.
- NAKS (of Paramaribo, founded in 1949) is now a social and cultural organisation.
- Deva Boys and FCS Nacional merged to form the Nacional Deva Boys in 2013.
