= SVB Lidbondentoernooi =

Lidbondentoernooi
- Country: Suriname
- Confederation: CONCACAF
- Number of clubs: 40 (8 Groups of 5)
- Level on pyramid: 3 (1973–)
- Promotion to: Eerste Divisie
- Domestic cup: Surinamese Cup
- Current: 2024 SVB Lidbondentoernooi

The SVB Lidbondentoernooi (English: Member Associations Tournament) is an annual football tournament organized by the Surinamese Football Association (SVB) since 2006. It is also known as the SURIBET Lidbondentoernooi due to sponsorship. The tournament is contested by the winners and runners-up of the districts leagues from the 20 regional member associations of the SVB. The winner and runner-up of the tournament can then qualify for the Eerste Divisie, the 2nd tier of football in Suriname.

== History ==
Until 2006 there were two tournaments, the "Randdistrictentoernooi" (1973-2005) for the ten member associations in and around the capital city Paramaribo, where the champion and runner-up each member association participated, and the "Inter-districtentoernooi" (1979-2005) which served as the inter district tournament for the other member associations of the SVB. In 2006 the two tournaments were fused together to create a more equal playing field. The winners and runners-up of the new tournament are then considered for promotion to the Eerste Klasse and on a few occasions have even been promoted directly to the Hoofdklasse, the top flight of football in Suriname.

== Lidbondentoernooi ==
Year	Winner	Association	Runners-up	Association
2006	PSV	Nickerie	Tammenga	Kwatta
2007	Eendracht	Livorno	Fortuna 1975	Lelydorp
2008	De Ster	Lelydorp	The Brothers	Coronie
2009	Inter Rica	Moengo	Tammenga	Kwatta
2010	Bomastar	Lelydorp	Fortuna 1975	Lelydorp
2011	ACoconut	Brokopondo	Santos	Nickerie
2012	Caravan	Livorno	Papatam	Albina
2013	West United	Coronie	Deva Boys	Meerzorg
2014	Jong Rambaan	Lelydorp	Nishan 42	Moengo
2015	Santos	Nickerie	Amar Deep	Paramaribo
2016	Flora	Nieuwe Generatie	Slee Juniors	Nieuwe Generatie
2017	Happy Boys	Meerzorg	Jong Aurora	Nieuwe Generatie
2018	Bintang Lahir	Meerzorg	Flamingo	Lelydorp
2019	Groningen	Saramacca	Sophia	Kwatta
2022	Sunny Point	Wanica	Happy Boys	Meerzorg
2023	TOK	Moengo	Highwaystar	Paramaribo
2024	Leiding	Wanica	Kampongbaroe	Saramacca
2025	Javoco	Paramaribo	Leiding	Saramacca

== Randdistrictentoernooi ==
Year	Winner	Association	Runners-up	Association
1973	Fortuna	Lelydorp	Santos	Paramaribo Centraal
1974	Sea Boys	Lelydorp		
1975	Boxel	Domburg	Flamingo	Lelydorp
1976	not contested			
1977	Boxel	Domburg	Soleram	Paramaribo Centraal
1978	S.C.A.	Lelydorp	Baru Padang	Kwatta
1979	Amarjoti	Kwatta	Mipro	Kwatta
1980	Real Java	Lelydorp	Kamal Dewaker	Livorno
1981	Ten CC	Domburg	Jai-Hind	Kwatta
1982	The Producers	Pontbuiten	Bonanza	Kwatta
1983	Marai	Nieuwe Generatie	Tornado	Lelydorp
1984	Grantjie Boys	Nieuwe Generatie	Inter Maretraite	Nieuwe Generatie
1985	Road	Nieuwe Generatie	PVV	Paramaribo Centraal
1986	De Rest	Blauwgrond	Vasas	Blauwgrond
1987	Lions '71	Nieuwe Generatie	Boxel '71	Domburg
1988	Edo	Kwatta	Minerva	Livorno
1989	Coronie Boys	Paramaribo Centraal	Sea Boys	Lelydorp
1990	Prakash	Leidingen	Palmeiras	Blauwgrond
1991	Big Fellow	Pontbuiten	Inter Benie	Kwatta
1992	Zwaluw	Blauwgrond	Tornado	Lelydorp
1993	not contested			
1994	Dego	Kwatta	Jai Hind	Meerzorg
1995	Juniors '88	Nieuwe Generatie	Surland	Leidingen
1996	H.O.B.	Kwatta	Excelsior	Meerzorg
1997	Young Rhythm	Pontbuiten	Walking Boyz Company	Nieuwe Generatie
1998	Royal '95	Kwatta	Fortuna 1975	Lelydorp
1999	not contested			
2000	Randjiet Boys	Leidingen	Super Red Eagles	Nieuwe Generatie
2001	not contested			
2002	Inter Kaya	Paramaribo Centraal	Cruzeiro	Livorno
2003	Ferano	Nieuwe Generatie	Amar Deep	Leidingen
2004	Pechan	Leidingen	S.I.O.S.	Blauwgrond
2005	Jai-Hanuman	Livorno	Excelsior	Meerzorg

== Inter-districtentoernooi ==
Year	Winner	Association	Runners-up	Association
1979	Santos	Nickerie		
1980	Arsenal	Wageningen		
1981	Real Moengo Tapoe	Moengo		
1982	Red Circle	Brokopondo		
1983	Osos	Coronie		
1984	Excelsior	Moengo		
1985	Arsenal	Coronie		
1986	Bill Stars	Para		
1987	Remo	Nickerie		
1988	not contested			
1989	Voorburg	Commewijne		
1990	Corona Boys	Coronie		
1991	Santos	Nickerie		
1992	Osos	Coronie		
1993	Inter Moengotapoe	Moengo		
1994	Peto	Moengo		
1995	Klaas Tiger	Brokopondo		
1996	SVV	Coronie		
1997	Papatam	Albina		
1998	Ricanau Mofo	Moengo	Jai Hind	Nickerie
1999	not contested			
2000	Lavoco	Coronie	FC Corona	Coronie
2001	not contested			
2002	Boskamp	Saramacca	Adjoema	Moengo
2003	Peto	Moengo	Arsenal	Coronie
2004	Freyburg	Saramacca	Papatam	Albina
2005	2000	Moengo	Notch	Moengo
