= 2015–16 SVB Eerste Klasse =

SVB Eerste Klasse
- Season: 2015–16

Location of the teams in the league

The 2015–16 Surinamese Eerste Klasse is the 60th season of the Eerste Klasse, the second highest football league competition of Suriname. The season will begin in November 2015, and will finish in June 2016.

== Changes from 2014–15 ==
Nishan '42 and Robinhood was promoted to the Hoofdklasse. Bomastar and SNL was relegated from the Hoofdklasse.

== Teams ==
=== Stadia and Locations ===
Note: Table lists in alphabetical order.

Team	Location	Stadium
Acoconut	Brokopondo	Brokopondo Stadium
Amar Deep	Uitkijk	Pechan Stadium
Bomastar	Lelydorp	Bomastar Sportscomplex
Caravan	Livorno	Eddy Blackman Stadion
Nacional Deva Boys	Houttuin	Nacionello Stadion
Jong Rambaan	Lelydorp	LSB Stadion
Papatam	Albina	Albina Stadion
PVV	Paramaribo	Dr. Ir. Franklin Essed Stadion
Santos	Nieuw Nickerie	Nickerie Stadion
SNL	Paramaribo	Dr. Ir. Franklin Essed Stadion
Voorwaarts	Paramaribo	Voorwaartsveld
West United	Totness	Letitia Vriesde Stadion

== League table and results ==
Pos	Team	Pld	W	D	L	GF	GA	GD	Pts	Promotion, qualification or relegation
1	Nacional Deva Boys (R)	22	17	0	5	62	30	+32	51	Relegation to Randdistrictentoernooi
2	Voorwaarts (C)	22	16	3	3	44	14	+30	51	Promotion to Hoofdklasse
3	Jong Rambaan (P)	22	16	2	4	54	31	+23	50	Promotion to Hoofdklasse
4	SNL (P)	22	12	2	8	38	23	+15	38	Promotion to Hoofdklasse
5	Caravan	22	9	7	6	44	30	+14	34	
6	West United	21	10	3	8	29	29	0	33	
7	ACoconut	21	8	3	10	33	40	−7	27	
8	Papatam	21	8	2	11	39	40	−1	26	
9	Santos	22	6	4	12	43	49	−6	22	
10	Bomastar	21	5	2	14	21	45	−24	17	Relegation Playoff
11	Amar Deep (R)	22	5	1	16	15	56	−41	16	Relegation to Randdistrictentoernooi
12	PVV (P)	22	3	1	18	20	55	−35	10	Promotion to Hoofdklasse

Updated to match(es) played on 13. October 2016.
(C) Champions;
(P) Promoted;
(R) Relegated

Home \ Away	ACO	AMA	BOM	CAR	DEB	JRA	PAP	PVV	STS	SNL	VOW	WUT
ACoconut	—	2–1	7–0	0–0	2–3	1–2	4–1	1–2	0–2	0–3	1–3	0–0
Amar Deep	0–2	—	0–4	1–6	0–7	2–1	0–1	1–0	1–4	0–1	1–3	0–3
Bomastar	0–1	0–2	—	2–2	0–1	1–1	2–3	2–1	1–3	0–2	0–2	0–1
Caravan	3–1	3–0	1–2	—	3–2	2–3	1–2	6–2	3–0	1–1	1–1	0–0
Nacional Deva Boys	3–4	5–1	1–0	3–0	—	3–1	2–1	1–0	5–4	1–2	0–3	3–0
Jong Rambaan	5–1	2–0	5–1	1–0	0–2	—	3–2	6–1	2–2	2–1	2–1	4–1
Papatam	0–1	4–1	x	2–1	2–3	1–2	—	2–1	2–2	2–1	1–2	1–2
PVV	1–1	0–1	1–2	0–2	0–8	1–3	2–6	—	3–1	1–2	0–1	1–2
Santos	2–3	0–0	4–2	3–4	1–2	2–3	3–1	4–2	—	1–1	0–1	0–2
SNL	6–1	3–1	3–0	1–2	3–4	0–1	2–1	1–0	4–2	—	1–0	0–1
Voorwaarts	3–0	4–0	4–1	1–1	1–2	3–1	1–1	2–0	3–1	1–0	—	3–0
West United	x	1–2	0–1	2–2	2–1	3–4	4–3	0–1	4–2	1–0	0–1	—

Updated to match(es) played on 13. October 2016. Source:

=== Championship Playoff ===
Deva Boys 1 - 3 Voorwarts (decided after extra-time)

== Related competitions ==
- 2015–16 SVB Hoofdklasse
- 2015–16 Surinamese Cup
- 2015–16 SVB President's Cup
