= 2016–17 SVB Cup =

2016–17 Surinamese Cup
Tournament details
- Country: Suriname
- Dates: January – May 2017
- Teams: 32

The 2016–17 Surinamese Cup (Beker van Suriname) is the 20th edition of the cup competition in Suriname. 32 teams from the top 3 leagues in the country will participate.

== First round ==
Matches are played between 6. January and 15. January
S.V. Nishan 42 – S.C.S. Randjiet Boys
S.V. Transvaal – Inter Boskamp
ACoconut – Rica Prof
S.V. Voorwaarts – S.C.S.V. Bomastar
S.V. Jong Rambaan – OSV
Sportvereniging Nationaal Leger – Kitha
S.V. Caravan – Slee Jr.
S.V. Papatam – Bintang Lair
S.V. Botopasi – Paraguay
Inter Moengotapoe – Sunny Point
F.C. West United – TOK
S.V. Notch – S.V. Santos
S.V. Leo Victor – BSV
WBC – Marcon
P.V.V. – Tahiti
S.V. Robinhood – Flora

== Round 1 ==
January 7
Rica Prof 0-1 ACoconut
Boma Star 1-1 Voorwaarts [4-3 pen]
Kitha 1-8 SNL
Slee Jr. 6-2 Caravan
Bintang Lair 0-2 Papatam [abandoned at 0–2 in 2nd half after 4 red cards against Bintang Lair]
Tahiti 1-2 PVV

January 8
OSV 1-5 Jong Rambaan

January 13
Flora 0-2 Robinhood

January 14
Randjiet Boys 0-4 Nishan 42
Paraguay 0-6 Botopasi [abandoned at 0–6 in 60' when Paraguay were left with 7 players]
Sunny Point 1-3 Inter Moengotapoe
TOK 1-1 West United [TOK on pen]
Santos 3-0 Notch
BSV 1-1 Leo Victor [Leo Victor on pen]
Marcon 0-3 WBC
Inter Boskamp 0-6 Transvaal

== Round 2 ==
March 3
Nishan 42 4-0 Boma Star
PVV 3-2 Transvaal

March 4
Santos 3-2 Botopasi
Leo Victor 5-1 Slee Jr.

March 5
WBC 2-1 SNL
Robinhood 0-2 Inter Moengotapoe

March 25
TOK 1-2 Papatam
ACoconut 3-1 Jong Rambaan

== Quarterfinals ==
April 23
Santos 2-0 PVV
Papatam 4-0 ACoconut

April 26
WBC 2-2 Leo Victor [WBC on pen (no extra time)]
Nishan 42 2-2 Inter Moengotapoe [3-4 pen (no extra time)]

== Semifinals ==
May 31
Inter Moengotapoe 6-0 Santos
Papatam 3-2 WBC

== Final ==
June 30, André Kamperveenstadion, Paramaribo
Inter Moengotapoe 3-3 Papatam [aet, 4-3 pen]
