= 2017–18 SVB Cup =

Beker van Suriname

Tournament details
- Country: Suriname
- Teams: 33

Final positions
- Champions: Robinhood (7th title)
- Runners-up: West United

Tournament statistics
- Matches played: 32
- Goals scored: 143 (4.47 per match)
- Top goal scorer: Ivanildo Rozenblad (8)

The 2017–18 SVB Cup was the 27th season of the Surinamese Cup. The competition began on 6 January and ended on 30 June 2018.

Robinhood beat West United in the final, 7–1, earning themselves their seventh SVB Cup, and their first since 2016.

== Bracket ==
First round
SNL	3
Ghana	0
Flamingo (pen.)	1 (4)
WBC	1 (3)
Real Leiding	1
Notch	2
Kamal Dewaker	2
Santos	3
Tahiti	3
Papatam	1
Deva Boys (pen.)	2 (5)
ACoconut	2 (3)
West United	6
Rodan	2
Broki	2
Slee Jr.	0
Robinhood	7
Marcon	0
Flora	1
Transvaal	4
Tamansari	1
Inter Moengotapoe	0
Klaas	0
Leo Victor	8
SVH	1
Notch	3
Happy Boys	1
Voorwaarts	3
PVV	2
Groningen	1
Jong Aurora	4
Botopasi	2

Second round
SNL	3
Flamingo	2
Real Leiding	3
Santos	2
Tahiti	3
Deva Boys	1
West United	2
Broki	1
Robinhood	3
Transvaal	0
Tamansari	0
Leo Victor	7
Notch	2
Voorwaarts	1
PVV (pen.)	4 (3)
Jong Aurora	3 (3)

Quarterfinals
SNL	3
Real Leiding	1
Tahiti	1
West United	5
Robinhood	4
Leo Victor	0
Notch	3
PVV	1

Semifinals
SNL	2
West United	3
Robinhood	2
Notch	1

Final
West United	1
Robinhood	7

== Results ==
=== Qualifying round ===
12 January 2018	Ghana	2–1	Ephraim

=== First round ===
31 clubs enter, winner of qualifying round enters.

6 January 2018	Broki	2–0	Slee Jr.

6 January 2018	Kamal Dewaker	2–3	Santos

6 January 2018	Happy Boys	1–2	Voorwaarts

6 January 2018	SVH	1–3	Notch

6 January 2018	Groningen	1–2	PVV

7 January 2018	Real Leiding	1–2	Nishan 42
Note: later awarded to Real Leiding

7 January 2018	Flora	1–4	Transvaal

13 January 2018	Tamansari	1–0	Inter Moengotapoe

13 January 2018	Flamingo	1–1 (a.e.t.) (4–3 p)	WBC

13 January 2018	Jong Aurora	4–2	Botopasi

13 January 2018	Marcon	0–7	Robinhood

13 January 2018	Rodan	2–6	West United

13 January 2018	Klaas	0–8	Leo Victor

14 January 2018	Deva Boys	2–2 (a.e.t.) (5–3 p)	ACoconut

14 January 2018	Tahiti	3–1	Papatam

27 January 2018	SNL	walkover	Ghana

=== Second round ===
21 March 2018	Leo Victor	7–0	Tamansari	Paramaribo
				Stadium: Dr. Ir. Franklin Essed Stadion

21 March 2018	SNL	3–2	Flamingo	Paramaribo
				Stadium: Dr. Ir. Franklin Essed Stadion

23 March 2018	Voorwaarts	1–2	Notch	Paramaribo
				Stadium: Dr. Ir. Franklin Essed Stadion

23 March 2018	PVV	3–3 (4–2 p)	Jong Aurora	Paramaribo
				Stadium: Dr. Ir. Franklin Essed Stadion
Note: No extra time, match went straight to penalties.

24 March 2018	Santos	2–3	Real Leiding	Paramaribo
				Stadium: Dr. Ir. Franklin Essed Stadion

24 March 2018	West United	2–1	Broki	Paramaribo
				Stadium: Dr. Ir. Franklin Essed Stadion

25 March 2018	Tahiti	3–1	Deva Boys	Paramaribo
				Stadium: Dr. Ir. Franklin Essed Stadion

25 March 2018	Robinhood	3–0	Transvaal	Paramaribo
				Stadium: Dr. Ir. Franklin Essed Stadion

=== Quarterfinals ===
8 April 2018	Tahiti	1–5	West United	Paramaribo
				Stadium: Dr. Ir. Franklin Essed Stadion

8 April 2018	Notch	3–1	PVV	Paramaribo
				Stadium: Dr. Ir. Franklin Essed Stadion

10 April 2018	Leo Victor	0–4	Robinhood	Paramaribo
				Stadium: Dr. Ir. Franklin Essed Stadion

11 April 2018	SNL	3–1	Real Leiding	Paramaribo
				Stadium: Dr. Ir. Franklin Essed Stadion

=== Semifinals ===
6 June 2018	SNL	2–3	West United	Paramaribo
				Stadium: Dr. Ir. Franklin Essed Stadion

6 June 2018	Robinhood	2–1	Notch	Paramaribo
				Stadium: Dr. Ir. Franklin Essed Stadion

=== Final ===
30 June 2018	West United	1–7	Robinhood	Paramaribo
18:00 SRT				Stadium: Dr. Ir. Franklin Essed Stadion; Referee: Mozes Keketi

== See also ==
- 2017–18 SVB Topklasse

== Notes ==
1. A: SNL beat Ghana via a walkover.
2. B: Real Leiding was awarded the victory on an unknown later date.
