= 2009–10 SVB Hoofdklasse =

Surinamese Hoofdklasse football season

Hoofdklasse
- Season: 2009–10
- Champions: Inter Moengotapoe
- Relegated: Jai Hanuman; FCS Nacional
- CFU Club Championship: Inter Moengotapoe; Walking Bout Company
- Top goalscorer: (Suriname) Amaktie Maasie (12 goals)
- Biggest home win: WBC 6–1 Boskamp
- Biggest away win: Jai Hanuman 0–4 Inter MT; Jai Hanuman 0–4 SVR
- Highest scoring: 5–3 (twice)

The 2009–10 Surinamese League (known officially as the Hoofdklasse) season was the 76th season of the Surinamese Hoofdklasse, the highest football league competition of Suriname.

== Teams ==
Excelsior, Super Red Eagles and Takdier Boys were relegated to the Eerste Klasse 2009-10 after finishing the 2008-2009 season in the bottom three places.Takdier Boys suffered their first relegation in Hoofdklasse.Super Red Eagles and Excelsior complete the list of relegated League

The three teams relegated were replaced by the champion of the Eerste Klasse Jai Hanuman, runner-up The Brothers that he acquired the accessed via the play-offs for promotion to win the Excelsior.

=== Stadiums and locations ===
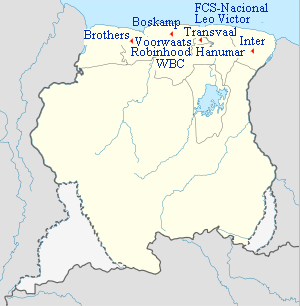
Location of the 2009-10 Hoofdklasse (Suriname)

The following 10 clubs competed in the Hoofdklasse during the 2009-10 season.

| Club | City | Stadium | Capacity | 2008-09 Position |
|---|---|---|---|---|
| Boskamp | Groningen | J. Eliazer Stadion | 1,000 | 5th |
| Inter Moengotapoe | Moengo | Ronnie Brunswijkstadion | 2,000 | 3rd |
| Jai Hanuman | Livorno | Eddy Blackman Stadion | 2,000 | Promoted |
| SV Leo Victor | Paramaribo | Dr.Ir.F.Essed Stadion | 3,500 | 2nd |
| FCS Nacional | Paramaribo | Nacionello Stadion | 1,500 | 8th |
| SV Robinhood | Paramaribo | Andre Kamperveen Stadion | 6,000 | 7th |
| The Brothers | Oost | Letitia Vriesde Sportcomplex | 1,000 | Promoted |
| SV Transvaal | Paramaribo | Andre Kamperveen Stadion | 6,000 | 4th |
| SV Voorwaarts | Paramaribo | Voorwaartsveld | 1,500 | 6th |
| Walking Boyz Company | Paramaribo | Andre Kamperveen Stadion | 6,000 | 1st |

== Regular season ==
=== Competition table ===
| Pos | Team | Pld | W | D | L | GF | GA | GD | Pts | Qualification or relegation |
|---|---|---|---|---|---|---|---|---|---|---|
| 1 | Inter Moengotapoe (C) | 17 | 13 | 1 | 3 | 46 | 22 | +24 | 40 | Qualification for 2011 CFU Club Championship |
| 2 | SV Walking Boyz Company | 17 | 10 | 3 | 4 | 37 | 21 | +16 | 33 | Qualification for 2011 CFU Club Championship |
| 3 | Leo Victor | 17 | 8 | 6 | 3 | 31 | 25 | +6 | 30 | |
| 4 | Robinhood | 17 | 7 | 4 | 6 | 29 | 26 | +3 | 25 | |
| 5 | Voorwaarts | 17 | 6 | 6 | 5 | 27 | 23 | +4 | 24 | |
| 6 | Transvaal | 17 | 6 | 4 | 7 | 23 | 27 | −4 | 22 | |
| 7 | Boskamp | 17 | 5 | 5 | 7 | 19 | 31 | −12 | 20 | |
| 8 | The Brothers | 17 | 3 | 3 | 11 | 24 | 36 | −12 | 12 | |
| 9 | Jai Hanuman | 17 | 1 | 7 | 9 | 19 | 37 | −18 | 10 | Qualification for Relegation playoffs |
| 10 | FCS Nacional (R) | 9 | 1 | 3 | 5 | 10 | 17 | −7 | 6 (Note: FCS Nacional withdrew from the league on May 7, after suspending nearly all players because of low turn-outs at training sessions, all results from the second half of the competition were annulled.) | Relegation to 2010–11 Eerste Klasse (Suriname) |

Updated to match(es) played on 23 May 2010. Source: FIFA.com
Rules for classification: 1) points; 2) goal difference; 3) number of goals scored.
(C) Champions; (R) Relegated

=== Results ===
| Home \ Away | BKP | IMT | JHN | SVL | FCN | SVR | TBR | SVT | SVV | WBC |
|---|---|---|---|---|---|---|---|---|---|---|
| Boskamp | | 1–3 | 3–0 | 0–0 | 3–2 | 1–1 | 0–1 | 0–1 | 0–0 | 1–3 |
| Inter Moengotapoe | 3–0 | | 5–2 | 5–1 | 2–1 | 3–1 | 4–2 | 2–1 | 3–1 | 2–3 |
| Jai Hanuman | 2–3 | 0–4 | | 1–1 | 1–1 | 0–4 | 0–0 | 0–1 | | 4–1 |
| SV Leo Victor | 1–1 | | 3–1 | | 3–2 | 3–0 | 3–1 | | 2–1 | 0–0 |
| FCS Nacional | 0–1 | 2–4 | 1–1 | 3–3 | | | 2–0 | 1–3 | 1–3 | 0–0 |
| SV Robinhood | 1–2 | 1–1 | 1–0 | 3–2 | 5–1 | | | 2–1 | 5–3 | 2–3 |
| The Brothers | | 0–3 | 3–1 | 2–3 | 3–1 | 1–1 | | 2–3 | 2–2 | 2–1 |
| SV Transvaal | 1–1 | 1–2 | 3–3 | 0–3 | 2–2 | | 2–1 | | 2–1 | |
| SV Voorwaarts | 6–1 | 2–0 | 1–1 | 0–0 | 4–2 | 1–1 | 2–1 | | | 0–2 |
| Walking Boyz Company | 6–1 | 1–2 | 2–2 | 5–1 | 3–5 | 2–0 | 3–2 | 2–1 | | |

Updated to match(es) played on 24 April 2010. Source:
Legend: Blue = home team win; Yellow = draw; Red = away team win.

== Season statistics ==
=== Top scorers ===
| Rank | Scorer | Club | Goals |
|---|---|---|---|
| 1 | (Suriname) Amaktie Maasie | Inter Moengotapoe | 12 |
| 2 | (Guyana) Anthony Abrams | SV Leo Victor | 6 |
| 2 | (Suriname) Jungelo Brunswick | Inter Moengotapoe | 6 |
| 2 | (Suriname) Vahid Vinisie | SV Voorwaarts | 5 |
| 2 | (Suriname) Romeo Jomena | SV Voorwaarts | 5 |
| 2 | (Suriname) Clifford Alleyne | SV Robinhood | 5 |

=== The least passed goalkeepers ===
| Name | Club | Matches | Against | Avg. |
|---|---|---|---|---|
| (Suriname) Brian Damba | Inter MT | 9 | 7 | 0,77 |
| (Suriname) Andre Zebeda | WBC | 7 | 6 | 0,85 |
| (Suriname) Obrendo Huiswoud | SV Voorwaarts | 8 | 9 | 1,12 |
| (Suriname) Manuel Kowid | SV Leo Victor | 7 | 11 | 1,57 |
| (Suriname) Richard Renolds | SV Robinhood | 7 | 11 | 1,57 |

=== Awards ===
| Award | Recipient |
|---|---|
| Most valuable player | (Suriname) Amaktie Maasie |
