= 2016–17 SVB Topklasse =

Topklasse
- Season: 2016–17
- Champions: Inter Moengotapoe; 9th title
- Relegated: Jong Rambaan
- CFU Club Championship: Inter Moengotapoe; Leo Victor
- Top goalscorer: 21 goals (Suriname) Ivanildo Rozenblad (Robinhood)
- Biggest home win: 10 goals WBC 6-4 Jong Rambaan
- Biggest away win: 8 goals Robinhood 2-6 WBC
- Highest scoring: 10 goals WBC 6-4 Jong Rambaan

The 2016–17 Telesur Topklasse is the 84th season of top tier Suriname football league and 1st season of the Topklasse, the highest football league competition of Suriname. The season began in November 2016, and ended in June 2017. Telesur became official broadcaster and sponsor of the Topklasse before the start of this season.

== Changes from 2015–16 ==
League expanded to 12 teams and changed names from Hoofdklasse to Topklasse.
Excelsior and Takdier Boys relegated to Eerste Klasse now known as the Hoofdklasse. Jong Rambaan, PVV, SNL and Voorwaarts were promoted from the Eerste Klasse.

== Teams ==
=== Stadia and locations ===
Note: Table lists in alphabetical order.

Location of the teams

Team	Location	Stadium
Botopasi	Botopasi	Mgr. Aloysius Zichem Sportcentrum (Paramaribo)
Inter Moengotapoe	Moengo	Ronnie Brunswijkstadion
Jong Rambaan	Lelydorp	LSB Stadion
Leo Victor	Paramaribo	Dr. Ir. Franklin Essed Stadion
Nishan 42	Meerzorg	Meerzorg Stadion
Notch	Moengo	Moengo Stadion
PVV	Paramaribo	Dr. Ir. Franklin Essed Stadion
Robinhood	Paramaribo	Dr. Ir. Franklin Essed Stadion
SNL	Paramaribo	Dr. Ir. Franklin Essed Stadion
Transvaal	Paramaribo	Andre Kamperveen Stadion
Voorwaarts	Paramaribo	Voorwaartsveld
WBC	Paramaribo	Andre Kamperveen Stadion

== League table and results ==
=== Regular season ===
Pos	Team	Pld	W	D	L	GF	GA	GD	Pts	Qualification or relegation	LEO	INT	WBC	ROB	NIS	TRV	BOT	VOW	PVV	JRA	NOT	SNL
1	Leo Victor	22	15	4	3	49	20	+29	49	CFU Club Championship	—	1–2	2–0	2–2	1–1	2–0	2–1	1–0	5–2	4–0	2–0	5–0
2	Inter Moengotapoe	22	15	4	3	47	19	+28	49	CFU Club Championship	2–1	—	2–2	0–1	2–1	3–0	0–0	3–1	4–0	3–1	2–0	3–1
3	WBC	22	14	5	3	58	31	+27	47		0–1	4–1	—	2–2	3–1	2–0	0–3	4–1	2–2	6–4	4–1	3–1
4	Robinhood	22	12	7	3	59	29	+30	43		2–2	1–0	2–6	—	1–1	0–0	5–1	4–1	7–1	1–1	8–0	2–1
5	Nishan 42	22	7	9	6	34	33	+1	30		2–1	1–2	1–3	2–1	—	1–1	1–3	2–0	1–1	0–0	2–0	2–1
6	Transvaal	22	8	5	9	28	30	−2	29		0–2	1–2	1–3	1–2	3–3	—	2–1	0–1	1–0	6–2	2–1	2–1
7	Botopasi	22	8	3	11	39	40	−1	27		2–3	0–3	1–2	2–1	3–3	1–1	—	2–4	1–0	5–0	-4-2	0–1
8	Voorwaarts	22	8	3	11	26	37	−11	27		1–5	0–1	1–1	1–4	1–1	0–2	0–2	—	2–0	2–0	2–0	3–1
9	PVV	22	5	5	12	31	50	−19	20		3–0	1–3	3–3	1–4	3–2	1–2	2–4	2–2	—	2–1	2–1	1–1
10	Jong Rambaan (Note: Jong Rambaan were refused a license for the 2017/18 season.) (R)	22	5	4	13	32	58	−26	19	Tweede Divisie	1–3	0–5	6–4	2–5	1–2	1–1	2–1	2–1	1–3	—	2–1	3–1
11	Notch	22	5	3	14	22	47	−25	18		0–1	1–1	0–4	1–1	1–3	1–0	3–1	0–1	2–1	4–4	—	2–0
12	SNL	22	3	2	17	17	48	−31	11		0–3	1–4	1–2	1–3	1–1	0–2	3–2	0–1	1–0	0–3	0–1	—

Updated to match(es) played on 15 June 2017.
Source: Soccerway SME Sport
Rules for classification: 1) points; 2) goal difference; 3) number of goals scored.
(R) Relegated

=== Championship decider ===
June 11, 2017
23:00

Leo Victor	1 – 2	Inter Moengotapoe
	Report

Dr. Ir. Franklin Essed Stadion

== Top scorers ==
Rank	Player	Club	Goals
1	(Suriname) Ivanildo Rozenblad	Robinhood	21
2	(Suriname) Wensley Christoph	Notch	7
3	(Suriname) Jimmy Patrick	P.V.V.	6
4	(Suriname) Gilberto Cronie	Leo Victor	5
4	(Brazil) Ruben Garcia Abreu	Nishan	5
4	(Suriname) Cereso Haboo	Robinhood	5
7	(Suriname) Galgyto Talea	Notch	4
7	(Suriname) Ivanildo Misidjan	Leo Victor	4
9	(Suriname) Gregory Rigters	WBC	3
9	(Suriname) Donovan Loswijk	SNL	3
9	(Suriname) Shorano Mawi	Voorwaarts	3

source: FIFA

== Related competitions ==
- 2016-17 SVB Eerste Klasse
- 2016-17 SVB Tweede Klasse
- 2016-17 SVB Beker van Suriname
- 2016-17 SVB President's Cup
