= 2024 SVB Eerste Divisie =

- Season: 2024
- Dates: 19 April 2024 – 23 December 2024
- Champions: Junior 2014
- Promoted: TBD
- Relegated: Real Moengotapoe; TOK (both excluded)
- Matches played: 68
- Goals scored: 139 (2.04 per match)
- All statistics correct as of 1 August 2024.

The 2024 SVB Eerste Divisie is the 90th season of the Eerste Divisie, and the first season of the Eerste Divisie being the 2nd tier in Suriname. The season started on 19 April.

== Teams and locations ==
Team	Location	2023 position
ACoconut	Brokopondo	7th
Botopasi	Botopasi	5th
Highwaystar	Paramaribo	2nd (Derde)
Junior 2014	Bernharddorp	2nd
Real Moengotapoe	Moengo	4th
Seaboys	Lelydorp	8th
Slee Juniors	Paramaribo	11th (First)
SNL	Paramaribo	10th (First)
Sophia	Kwatta	6th
Tahitie	Brokopondo	3rd
TOK	Moengo	1st (Derde)

== League table ==
Pos	Team	Pld	W	D	L	GF	GA	GD	Pts	Qualification or relegation
1	Real Moengotapoe	10	9	0	1	38	7	+31	27	Promotion round
2	TOK	10	7	1	2	30	14	+16	22	Promotion round
3	Sophia	10	6	0	4	19	19	0	18	Promotion round
4	Seaboys	10	4	3	3	22	17	+5	15	Promotion round
5	Junior 2014	10	5	0	5	23	28	−5	15	Promotion round
6	Slee Juniors	10	3	4	3	19	19	0	13	Promotion round
7	ACoconut (Note: ACoconut was deducted 3 points.)	10	5	0	5	19	23	−4	12	
8	Tahitie	10	2	4	4	23	31	−8	10	
9	Highwaystar	10	2	2	6	13	20	−7	8	
10	SNL (R)	10	2	2	6	14	25	−11	8	Relegation to the Lidbondentoernooi
11	Botopasi (R)	10	1	2	7	9	26	−17	5	Relegation to the Lidbondentoernooi

Updated to match(es) played on 1 August 2024. Source:
Rules for classification: 1) Points; 2) Head-to-head points; 3) Head-to-head goal difference; 4) Head-to-head goals scored; 5) Goal difference; 6) Goals scored
(R) Relegated

== Promotion round ==
Pos	Team	Pld	W	D	L	GF	GA	GD	Pts	Qualification or relegation
1	Real Moengotapoe (Note: On the last round, Real Moengotapoe was playing against TOK and was winning by 4-1, when they suddenly started letting TOK score at will, thus allowing their Moengo neighbours to get the win they needed to finish second and be promoted. SVB started a match-fixing investigation and both clubs were found guilty and expelled from the league.)	4	4	0	0	9	3	+6	12	Expelled
2	Junior 2014	4	2	1	1	13	10	+3	7	
3	TOK	4	2	1	1	9	7	+2	7	Expelled
4	Slee Juniors	4	2	0	2	8	7	+1	6	
5	Seaboys	4	1	0	3	4	8	−4	3	
6	Sophia	4	0	0	4	5	13	−8	0	

Updated to match(es) played on 1 August 2024. Source:
Rules for classification: 1) Points; 2) Head-to-head points; 3) Head-to-head goal difference; 4) Head-to-head goals scored; 5) Goal difference; 6) Goals scored
