= 2022–23 SVB Tweede Divisie =

Football league season in Suriname

SVB Tweede Divisie
- Season: 2022–23
- Dates: 10 January 2023 – 23 July 2023
- Champions: Sunny Point
- Promoted: none
- Relegated: Happy Boys; Kamal Dewaker
- Matches played: 170

The 2022–23 SVB Tweede Divisie was the 65th official season of the SVB Tweede Divisie, the 2nd division of Suriname. Sunny Point won the Second Division, but were not promoted due to the new formation of the Suriname Major League. The season had a delayed beginning, and began on 10 January 2023. It concluded on 23 July 2023.

== Teams ==
Flora and Slee Juniors were promoted to the 2022–23 SVB Eerste Divisie. Groningen withdrew from the 2022 SVB Tweede Divisie, after 7 rounds.

== Teams and locations ==
Team	Location
ACoconut	Brokopondo
Botopasi	Botopasi
Happy Boys	Meerzorg
Junior 2014	Bernharddorp
Kamal Dewaker	Groningen
Real Moengotapoe	Moengo
Sea Boys	Lelydorp
Sophia	Kwatta
Sunny Point	Wanica
Tahitie	Brokopondo

== Table ==
Pos	Team	Pld	W	D	L	GF	GA	GD	Pts	
1	Sunny Point (Note: Sunny Point were not promoted due to the set-up of the new Suriname Major League.) (C)	18	12	5	1	46	19	+27	41	
2	Junior 2014	17	9	3	5	40	32	+8	30	Eerste Divisie
3	Tahitie	17	9	3	5	36	29	+7	30	Eerste Divisie
4	Real Moengotapoe	18	9	1	8	45	41	+4	28	Eerste Divisie
5	Botopasi	18	8	3	7	41	35	+6	27	Eerste Divisie
6	Sophia	16	7	4	5	33	25	+8	25	Eerste Divisie
7	ACoconut	17	8	0	9	40	36	+4	24	Eerste Divisie
8	Sea Boys	17	6	3	8	33	43	−10	21	Eerste Divisie
9	Happy Boys	17	2	3	12	18	43	−25	9	
10	Kamal Dewaker	16	2	1	13	19	48	−29	7	

Updated to match(es) played on 11 April 2024. Source:
(C) Champions
