= George W. Streepy Stadion =

Football stadium in Paramaribo, Suriname

George Streepy Stadion
- Interactive map of George Streepy Stadion
- Location: Paramaribo, Suriname
- Coordinates: 5.82998°N 55.17844°W
- Owner: Ministry of Sports and Youth Affairs
- Operator: Surinaamse Voetbal Bond
- Capacity: 1,500
- Surface: Grass

Construction
- Opened: 17 December 1966
- Renovated: 2018

Tenants
- Coronie Boys (youth) (1966–); Jai-Hind (youth) (1966–); Leo Victor (youth) (1966–); Robinhood (youth) (1966–); Nautico (youth) (1966–); Transvaal (youth) (1966–); Tuna (youth) (1966–); Voorwaarts (youth) (1966–)

George W. Streepy Stadion is an association football stadium in Paramaribo, Suriname. It is home to the SVB Youth League and is operated by the SVB's youth football section. The stadium previously had a capacity of 3,000 people with the individual seats reducing it to 1,500 since 2018.

== Location ==
The George W. Streepy Stadium is located in Southwestern part of Paramaribo on the Rode Kruislaan.

== History ==
Named after the former director of the Surinaamse Aluminium Company, the George Streepy Stadium was opened on 17 December 1966 on the Rode Kruislaan. The first match at the stadium was the Paramaribo youth team vs. the Districts youth team. The referee for this match was S. Reemet, with linesmen R. Vyent and R. Redmond. The match ended in a 3–3 draw. The board of directors in 1966 consisted of chairman J. Gersie, secretary A. Hoost and Frits Juda as director of competition. André Kamperveen, R. Belgrave, Mouke Pool and G. Lichtveld were the commissioners. At that time the Surinamese Football Association had only been responsible for the Junior League system, taking control of the entire youth system across the country in 1965. The first youth teams to become tenants of the George Streepy Stadium were Coronie Boys, Jai-Hind, Leo Victor, Robinhood, Nautico, Transvaal, Tuna and Voorwaarts. The first Junior League champions were Transvaal (1966), Tuna (1967) and Voorwaarts (1968). In 2011, the stadium was transferred to the Ministry of Sports and Youth Affairs.
