= 2022 SVB Tweede Divisie =

SVB Tweede Divisie
- Season: 2022
- Dates: 17 March 2022 – 31 July 2022
- Champions: PVV B
- Promoted: Flora; Slee Juniors
- Relegated: Groningen
- Matches played: 49
- Goals scored: 176 (3.59 per match)

The 2022 SVB Tweede Divisie was the 64th official season of the SVB Tweede Divisie, the 2nd division of Suriname. PVV B won the Second Division, but were not promoted due to being the reserve team of PVV. The season began on 17 March 2022. It concluded on 31 July 2022.

== Teams and locations ==
Team	Location
Flamingo	Lelydorp
Flora	Paramaribo
Groningen	Groningen
Inter Wanica B	Kwatta
Junior 2014	Lelydorp
Kamal Dewaker	Livorno
PVV B	Paramaribo
Slee Juniors	Paramaribo

== League table ==
Pos	Team	Pld	W	D	L	GF	GA	GD	Pts	
1	PVV B (Note: Reserve teams are ineligible for promotion.) (C)	13	10	0	3	37	15	+22	30	
2	Flora (P)	13	9	2	2	36	11	+25	29	Promotion to 2022–23 SVB Eerste Divisie
3	Slee Juniors (P)	13	7	5	1	29	18	+11	26	Promotion to 2022–23 SVB Eerste Divisie
4	Junior 2014	13	4	4	5	19	23	−4	16	
5	Inter Wanica B	13	4	4	5	20	25	−5	16	
6	Flamingo (Note: Flamingo were declined a license for the 2022/23 season.) (R)	13	3	3	7	11	21	−10	12	Relegation to Lelydorp Eerste Klasse
7	Kamal Dewaker	13	2	2	9	19	35	−16	8	
8	Groningen (Note: Groningen withdrew from the league after the 7th round.) (R)	7	0	0	7	8	31	−23	0	Withdrawn

Updated to match(es) played on 16 April 2024. Source:
(C) Champions; (P) Promoted; (R) Relegated
