= V.V. Amar Deep =

Surinamese football club

Amar Deep
- Full name: Voetbalvereniging Amar Deep
- Founded: 1 July 1970; 56 years ago
- Ground: Nieuwe Leidingen Voetbalveld; Paramaribo, Suriname
- Capacity: 1,000
- President: Glenn Piroe
- Manager: Ruben Piroe
- League: Eerste Klasse
- 2015–16: 11th
- Website: http://scsvamardeep.weebly.com/
Home colours

Voetbalvereniging Amar Deep is a Surinamese football club based in the Leidingen neighborhood of Paramaribo, Suriname. The club presently compete in the Eerste Klasse, the 2nd tier of Surinamese football.

== History ==
Amar Deep was founded in 1970 by Rabindrenath Jhingoer and Ahmad Piroe. The club is situated on Leiding 17 in Leidingen, Suriname, where Bhoei Ramsingh had the Nieuwe Leidingen Voetbalveld built for the club's home ground.

VV Amar Deep joined the Uitvlucht en Leidingen Voetbalbond (ULVB) association, the predecessor of the Sportorganisatie Leidingen en Omgeving (SOLO) a member association of the Surinamese Football Association. In the club's first season they just missed qualification for the Randdistrictentoernooi, which could have qualified them for the upper tiers of Surinamese football.

In the eighties, the club relegated back to the Derde Klasse, managing to qualify for the Eerste Klasse by the end of the decade under managers Carlos Deekman and Edmund Reid. In 1995, several players left the club which resulted in the team recruiting several street footballers to join the selection. In 1999 the club was saved from dissolution by Rahmad Piroe, who helped the team back to the upper echelons after finishing as runners-up in the Randdistrictentoernooi in 2003.

The team currently compete in the Eerste Klasse having finished as runners-up to Santos in the Lidbondentoernooi in 2015.

== Youth team ==
In 2011, the club launched a youth team by the name of S.C.S.V. Amar Deep Jeugd, competing in the SVB Junior League, and the SOLO youth leagues.

== Notable coaches ==
- (Suriname) Carlos Deekman
- (Suriname) Edmund Reid
- (Suriname) Rahmad Piroe
