= 2007–08 SVB Hoofdklasse =

SVB Hoofdklasse
- Season: 2007-08
- Champions: Boskamp
- Relegated: Royal '95; Randjiet Boys
- CFU Club Championship: Boskamp; Inter Moengotapoe
- Matches played: 72
- Goals scored: 273 (3.79 per match)

The 2007–08 season of the Hoofdklasse started in August 2007 and ended in May 2008. Defending champions are Inter Moengotapoe.

== Promoted teams ==
The following teams are promoted to the Eredivisie at the start of the season:

- Boskamp
- Randjiet Boys

== League table ==
Pos	Team	Pld	W	D	L	GF	GA	GD	Pts	Qualification or relegation
1	Boskamp	16	9	3	4	22	14	+8	30	Qualifies for the CFU Club Championship
2	Inter Moengotapoe	16	8	6	2	26	20	+6	30	Qualifies for the CFU Club Championship
3	SV Robinhood	16	9	3	4	32	29	+3	30	
4	Super Red Eagles	16	7	2	7	23	20	+3	23	
5	SV Transvaal	16	6	5	5	14	18	−4	23	
6	Walking Bout Company	16	6	4	6	25	21	+4	22	
7	SV Leo Victor	16	6	4	6	24	25	−1	22	
8	Jai Hanuman	16	6	3	7	30	25	+5	21	
9	FCS Nacional	16	6	3	7	24	24	0	21	
10	SV Voorwaarts	16	5	4	7	23	22	+1	19	
11	Royal '95	16	3	5	8	16	23	−7	14	Relegated to the 2008–09 Eerste Divisie
12	Randjiet Boys	16	2	4	10	14	32	−18	10	Relegated to the 2008–09 Eerste Divisie

== Round 1 ==
2007-10-17
18:35

SV Leo Victor	1 – 0	Royal '95
Derrick Garden 88' (pen.)

Dr.Ir.F.Essed Stadion, Paramaribo

2007-10-18

SV Transvaal	1 – 1	Randjiet Boys
Ronny Aloema (pen.)		Ivan Soebai (pen.)

Andre Kamperveen Stadion, Paramaribo

2007-10-19

Walking Bout Company	1 – 1	Inter Moengotapoe
Romeo Joval		Amaktie Maasie 72'

Paramaribo

2007-10-20

FCS Nacional	2 – 1	Jai Hanuman
Jermain van Dijk; Armeno Lingaard		Alex Soares

Nacionello, Paramaribo

2007-10-20

SV Robinhood	1 – 2	Boskamp
Furgil Ong A Fat		Jermain Carbin; Miquel Slagveer

Andre Kamperveen Stadion, Paramaribo

2007-10-21

Super Red Eagles	1 – 0	SV Voorwaarts
Patrick Cronie

Dr.Ir.F.Essed Stadium, Paramaribo

== Round 2 ==
2007-10-27

Jai Hanuman	4 – 4	SV Robinhood
Everton Farias 7'; Galgito Talea 52'; Alex Soares 64' (pen.), 87'		Jermin Browne; Furgil Ong A Fat 75'; Leandro Grond 82'; Ifenildo Vlijter

2007-10-27

Inter Moengotapoe	1 – 1	SV Leo Victor
Sirano Amoeferie		Garvin Grant

Moengo

2007-10-27

SV Voorwaarts	1 – 3	SV Transvaal
Clifford Alleyne		Giovanni Tiendarie; Siegfried Uralima; Lorenzo Zoutkamp

Paramaribo

2007-10-28

Boskamp	2 – 3	FCS Nacional
Clyde Riedewald 5',		Ricardo Joaquim 2'; Gregory Pokie 9'; Germain van Dijk

2007-10-29

Randjiet Boys	0 – 3	Super Red Eagles
		Kenzo Huur 11', 19', 75'

2007-10-29

Royal '95	3 – 2	Walking Bout Company
Jurgen Weidum 79'; Janilson Silva 83'; Giovanni Renfrum 85'		Cleven Wanabo 33'; Gino Brandon 62'

== Round 3 ==
2007-11-02

SV Transvaal	1 – 0	Super Red Eagles
Clifford Alleyne 45'

2007-10-03

Jai Hanuman	2 – 4	Boskamp
Rodrigo Allan,		Clyde Riedwald, Miguel Harderwijk; Malcom Weibolt

2007-10-03

FCS Nacional	0 – 1	SV Robinhood
		Ifenildo Vlijter 78'

2007-10-04

Randjiet Boys	0 – 5	SV Voowaarts
		Ronald Strijdhaftig; Gregory Rigters; Giovanni Drenthe

2008-01-09

Royal '95	0 – 1	Inter Moengotapoe
		Amaktie Maasie 78'

2008-01-30

Walking Bout Company	1 – 0	SV Leo Victor
Derrick Garden 36' (pen.)

== Top scorers ==
Goals	Player	Team
13	(Suriname) Gregory Rigters	Voorwaarts
12	(Suriname) Amaktie Maasie	Inter Moengotapoe
12	(Suriname) Ifenildo Vlijter	SV Robinhood
9	(Suriname) Gino Brandon	Walking Boyz Company
9	(Suriname) Claudio Pinas	Inter Moengotapoe

== See also ==
- 2007–08 Eredivisie
