= S.V. Caravan =

Surinamese football club

Caravan
- Full name: Sport Vereniging Caravan
- Ground: Eddy Blackman Stadion; Livorno, Suriname
- Capacity: 2,000
- League: Eerste Klasse
- 2015/16: 5th
Home colours

Sport Vereniging Caravan is an association football club from Livorno, Suriname. The club currently compete in the SVB Eerste Klasse, the 2nd tier of football in Suriname.

== Achievements ==
- Lidbondentoernooi

2012
