= 1923–24 SVB Eerste Klasse =

Eerste Klasse
- Season: 1923–24
- Champions: Olympia
- Relegated: Imperator; UDI; Zwaluw
- Matches: 66
- Goals: 62 (0.94 per match)
- Biggest home win: Olympia 4–0 Zwaluw (10 August 1924); Voorwaarts 4–0 Excelsior (24 August 1924)
- Biggest away win: Blauw-Wit 0–4 Olympia (10 February 1924)

The 1923–24 SVB Eerste Klasse is the first ever official season of the Eerste Klasse. Olympia won their first title. At the end of the season, Olympia and Imperator joined the KVB Eerste Klasse.

== League table ==
Pos	Team	Pld	W	D	L	GF	GA	GD	Pts	Qualification or relegation
1	Olympia (C)	11	7	3	1	22	3	+19	17	Champions
2	Blauw-Wit	11	5	4	2	9	10	−1	14	
3	Excelsior	11	4	4	3	9	13	−4	12	
4	Voorwaarts	11	2	6	3	8	6	+2	10	
5	Ajax	11	4	2	5	6	11	−5	10	
6	Zwaluw (O)	11	1	3	7	4	15	−11	5	Relegation Play-off
7	UDI (R)	6	1	2	3	4	4	0	4	Withdrew
8	Imperator (R)	0	—	—	—	—	—	—	0	Withdrew; all results annulled

Rules for classification: 1) Points; 2) Head-to-head points; 3) Head-to-head goal difference; 4) Head-to-head goals scored; 5) Goal difference; 6) Goals scored
(C) Champions; (O) Play-off winners; (R) Relegated

== Relegation play-off ==
24 September 1924

Zwaluw	1–0	Transvaal
	Report

Both remained at former level; however, Transvaal were promoted as Olympia joined the rival K.V.B. (like Imperator) and did not enter the league in the 1925 season; Ajax and Zwaluw merged as of Dec 5, 1924, with the merger club retaining the name Ajax.
