= S.C.S. Jai-Hind =

Jai-Hind
- Full name: Sociaal Cultureel en Sportvereniging Jai-Hind
- Founded: 2 October 1932; 93 years ago
- Ground: Sport Complex Kwatta; Kwatta, Suriname
- Capacity: 1,200
- President: Jenny Jankie
- League: Derde Divisie
- 2014/15: 4th
Home colours

S.C.S Jai-Hind, known simply as Jai-Hind, is a Surinamese association football club based in Kwatta, Suriname. The club is almost entirely made up of Hindustani people, and as such was the first Hindustani football club to qualify and compete in the Hoofdklasse, the top flight of football in Suriname.

There are two other Surinamese football clubs by the same name, one from Meerzorg, and one from Nickerie. All three clubs compete in their respective districts and in the Inter district tournaments.

== History ==
Founded on 2 October 1932 in Kwatta, Wanica District, S.C.S. Jai-Hind was named after the Indian patriotic battle cry "Jai Hind" (Hindi: जय हिन्द) by the local villagers of Hindustani descent. The club is mostly made up of farmers from the small village who originally played on a cow field, where the cows would need to be chased away before each match and the cow dung removed. The maintenance of the playing field was kept up by the players themselves, who would use hewers to cut the grass. wed

The team players are all farmhands who spend their days getting up early, milking the cows, working on the fields and coming home to rice, beans and mud fish. The highlight of the week is when chicken (rasfowru) is prepared for the villagers. Spending most of their days working the land the players of Jai-Hind practice three times a week, playing organized matches on the weekends. The players of Jai-Hind are known for their physical strength which is a direct result of farming in an environment where most tasks are still performed by hand, such as digging, plowing, shoveling, weeding and watering the plants.

In 1970 Jai-Hind were promoted to the SVB Hoofdklasse, the top tier of football in Suriname. The final match of the previous Eerste Klasse season was against Nautico Rio. The players received the first official playing kits ahead of the match. As the team took the bus to the stadium, they were surprised by how many Hindustani people had shown up. Never in the history of football in Suriname had a Hindustani club come this close to qualifying for the top flight. To the players surprise the stadium was closed. Due to heavy rainfall the match had been rescheduled for the following day. No one in the village of Kwatta had a telephone at the time, so it was not possible for the SVB to notify the team of the cancellation. The next day the match was held in front of a sold out crowd. The first time an Eerste Klasse match had sold out, and also the first time a match from the Eerste Klasse was broadcast live on the radio.

Jai-Hind went on to win the match, thus promoting to the SVB Hoofdklasse, the goal scorers were Jagroep, Soekhnandan "Gama" Kewalapat (2x), the assists for both the second and third goal were given by Soerinder Ratchasing. That season Soekhnandan Kewalapat also finished as the top scorer of the Eerste Klasse with 23 goals. It was the first time a Hindustani player had achieved this feat in Suriname.Still today this record is not beaten by a Hindustani player.

Later a small sporting complex was built in the town. The Sport Complex Kwatta, a small multi-purpose sporting facility which now serves as the home grounds for the club.

== Honours ==
- Randdistrictentoernooi

Runners-up: 1981
