= S.V. Slee Juniors =

Surinamese football club

Slee Juniors
- Full name: Sport Vereniging Slee Juniors
- Founded: 2003; 23 years ago as Pikin Slee
- Ground: George Deul Stadion
- Capacity: 1,000
- League: Eerste Divisie
- 2023: Eerste Divisie, 11th of 14
Home colours	Away colours	Third colours

Sport Vereniging Slee Juniors, or simply Slee Juniors for short, is a Surinamese football club based in Paramaribo. They currently compete in the Eerste Divisie.

== History ==
The club was founded in 2003. They mostly played in the Lidbondentoernooi, until 2016, when they were promoted to the Tweede Divisie for the first time. In 2022, they were promoted to the Eerste Divisie for the first time in their history.

== Honours ==
S.V. Slee Juniors honours
Honours	No.	Years
NGVB 1e Divisie	1	2015
Derde Divisie runner-up	1	2015–16
Tweede Divisie third place	1	2022
