= S.V. Tuna =

Surinamese football club

Tuna
- Full name: Sport Vereniging Tuna
- Founded: 1 November 1950; 74 years ago
- Ground: Plein van 12 Mei; Paramaribo, Suriname
- League: Lidbondentoernooi

S.V. Tuna is a Surinamese football club from the capital city Paramaribo, currently playing in the Lidbondentoernooi, the 3rd tier of football in Suriname.

== History ==
Founded on 1 November 1950 in Paramaribo, Suriname, S.V. Tuna played in the Hoofdklasse, the top flight of football in Suriname from the 1950s to the 1980s. Considered a strong club in the golden age of football in Suriname, the club brought forth many talents, such as Armand Sahadewsing, Puck Eliazer, Edwin Schal, Errol Emanuelson and Andy Atmodimedjo. Playing their home matches on the Plein van 12 Mei, the square to commemorate the abolishment of slavery, their head office is located on the Sophiastraat.

Tuna had a famous youth program, but were unable to win the national championship during their period at the top flight. During the eighties and nineties the club suffered some setbacks, and were eventually relegated to the Eerste Klasse in 1992. The club currently compete in the amateur district leagues of Suriname.
