= PSV Nickerie =

Association football club from Nieuw-Nickerie, Suriname

PSV
- Full name: Politie Sportvereniging Nickerie
- Founded: 25 September 1976; 48 years ago
- Ground: Nickerie Voetbal Stadion; Nieuw Nickerie, Suriname
- Capacity: 3,400
- League: Lidbondentoernooi
Home colours

PSV Nickerie (Politie Sportvereniging, English: Police Sports club) is a Surinamese football club from Nieuw Nickerie, currently playing in the district league of the Nickerie Voetbal Bond. The team play their home games at the Nickerie Voetbal Stadion to a capacity of 3,400 people.

== History ==
Founded on 25 September 1976, PSV Nickerie are not the first football club of a Surinamese police force to participate in the higher levels of football in Suriname. In 1924 S.P.S.V. (Surinaamse Politie Sport Vereniging) was founded in the capital city Paramaribo, and served as the football club of the local police. The club name was then changed to P.V.V. (Politie Voetbal Vereniging) on 6 February 1945. The police force in Nieuw Nickerie registered their sports club in 2000 and were able to clinch the Lidbondentoernooi only 6 years later, thus promoting to the SVB Eerste Klasse, the 2nd tier of football in Suriname. The football kits of the club are manufactured by Italian sportswear company Lotto.

== Honours ==
- Lidbondentoernooi: 1

2006
