= 1933 SVB Eerste Klasse =

Football season

Eerste Klasse
- Season: 1933
- Dates: 12 February 1933 – 18 June 1933
- Champions: Cicerone
- Matches played: 15
- Goals scored: 46 (3.07 per match)

The 1933 SVB Eerste Klasse was the eighth season of the Eerste Klasse. Cicerone won their second title.

== Teams and locations ==
Team	Location
ADO	Paramaribo
Cicerone	Paramaribo
Go Ahead	Paramaribo
MVV	Paramaribo
Transvaal	Paramaribo
Velocitas	Paramaribo
Voorwaarts	Paramaribo

== League table ==
Pos	Team	Pld	W	D	L	GF	GA	GD	Pts	
1	Cicerone	5	5	0	0	11	2	+9	10	Champions
2	Voorwaarts	5	3	1	1	14	3	+11	7	
3	MVV	5	3	0	2	6	8	−2	6	
4	Go Ahead	5	1	2	2	6	4	+2	4	
5	Transvaal	5	1	1	3	5	8	−3	3	
6	ADO	5	0	0	5	4	21	−17	0	
7	Velocitas (Note: Velocitas withdrew after the 2nd round.)	2	0	0	2	1	17	−16	0	Withdrew

Rules for classification: 1) Points; 2) Head-to-head points; 3) Head-to-head goal difference; 4) Head-to-head goals scored; 5) Goal difference; 6) Goals scored
