= S.V. Tahitie =

Surinamese football club

- Full name: Sport Vereniging Tahitie
- Founded: 1 May 1977; 49 years ago
- Ground: Bigi Wey Sports Center, Brownsweg, Suriname
- Capacity: 1,300
- League: Eerste Divisie
- 2022–23: Tweede Divisie, 3rd
Home colours

S.V. Tahitie is a Surinamese football club based in Brownsweg, Suriname. The club currently competes in the Eerste Divisie.

== History ==
The club was founded in the 1st of May, 1977 in Brownsweg to grow football in the town. The club mostly competed in the District Leagues and the Lidbondentoernooi until they got promoted to the SVB Tweede Divisie for the first time.
