= 1935 SVB Eerste Klasse =

Football season

Eerste Klasse
- Season: 1935
- Dates: 1 February 1935 – 29 September 1935
- Champions: Cicerone
- Matches: 36
- Goals: 98 (2.72 per match)

The 1935 SVB Eerste Klasse was the tenth season of the Eerste Klasse. Cicerone won their fourth title in a row.

== Teams and locations ==
Team	Location
Cicerone	Paramaribo
De Roode Duivels	Paramaribo
El Deportivo	Paramaribo
Go Ahead	Paramaribo
Jong Ajax	Paramaribo
MVV	Paramaribo
Paramount	Paramaribo
PVV	Paramaribo
Transvaal	Paramaribo
Voorwaarts	Paramaribo

== League table ==
Pos	Team	Pld	W	D	L	GF	GA	GD	Pts	
1	Cicerone	9	6	2	1	15	7	+8	14	Champions
2	Go Ahead	8	4	3	1	14	6	+8	11	
3	Jong Ajax	7	3	3	1	10	7	+3	9	
4	Paramount	7	3	2	2	6	5	+1	8	
5	PVV	8	2	4	2	16	13	+3	8	
6	Voorwaarts	6	2	2	2	12	5	+7	6	
7	El Deportivo	6	2	2	2	6	7	−1	6	
8	Transvaal	6	1	2	3	3	9	−6	4	
9	MVV	7	1	2	4	15	12	+3	4	
10	De Roode Duivels	5	0	0	5	1	27	−26	0	

Rules for classification: 1) Points; 2) Head-to-head points; 3) Head-to-head goal difference; 4) Head-to-head goals scored; 5) Goal difference; 6) Goals scored
