= Bigi Wey Sports Center =

Sports venue in Brokopondo, Suriname

- Brokopondo Stadion
- Interactive map of Bigi Wey Sports Center
- Full name: Bigi Wey Sports Center
- Location: Brownsweg; Brokopondo; Suriname
- Coordinates: 5.01176°N 55.16860°W
- Capacity: 1300
- Type: Sports venue
- Surface: Grass
- Field shape: rectangle

Construction
- Built: 2010
- Opened: 2012/2013
- Cost: $625,000

Tenants
- ACoconut (2012–); Tahitie (2012–)

Bigi Wey Sports Center is a sports venue located in Brokopondo District, Suriname. It hosted a knockout tournament marking the 150th-anniversary of Suriname's emancipation day.

In 2009, the Ilonka Elmont Foundation conducted a research into sports venues, sports needs and sports participation in Brownsweg. They inferred that Brownsweg needed a sports venue and planned to make one. The construction was a joint project of Rosabel Goldmines, the Ilonka Elmont Foundation and the KNVB (Royal Dutch Football Federation).

== Construction ==
Constructed in 2010, it was officially opened with a ceremony in 2012. Unsuitable weather forced the inspection of the field to be rescheduled.

The construction cost amounted to over 625,000 dollars in total.

== Facilities ==
The complex contains a field with floodlights for competitive games, a cafeteria, a first aid room, storage space, two restrooms and a parking lot.
