= S.V. Sophia =

- Full name: Sport Vereniging Sophia
- Ground: Fred Derby Sport Complex
- Capacity: 1,000
- League: Eerste Divisie
- 2022–23: Tweede Divisie, 6th

S.V. Sophia is a Surinamese football club based in Kwatta. The club currently competes in the Eerste Divisie.

== History ==
Sophia mostly played in the Kwatta Sportbond League, until 2019, when they won the competition and then were runner-ups of the Derde Divisie.
