= 1934 SVB Eerste Klasse =

Football season

Eerste Klasse
- Season: 1934
- Dates: 25 February 1934 – 26 August 1934
- Champions: Cicerone
- Matches: 45
- Goals: 154 (3.42 per match)

The 1934 SVB Eerste Klasse was the ninth season of the Eerste Klasse. Cicerone won their third title. Thanks to Cicerone's third win in a row, Cicerone was awarded the SVB Beker.

== Teams and locations ==
Team	Location
Cicerone	Paramaribo
De Roode Duivels	Paramaribo
El Deportivo	Paramaribo
Go Ahead	Paramaribo
MVV	Paramaribo
Paramount	Paramaribo
Stormvogels	Paramaribo
Swift	Paramaribo
Transvaal	Paramaribo
Voorwaarts	Paramaribo

== League table ==
Pos	Team	Pld	W	D	L	GF	GA	GD	Pts	
1	Cicerone	9	8	0	1	35	4	+31	16	Champions
2	Voorwaarts	9	7	1	1	18	5	+13	15	
3	Go Ahead	9	6	1	2	19	9	+10	13	
4	MVV	9	3	5	1	16	17	−1	11	
5	El Deportivo	9	3	2	4	12	15	−3	8	
6	Paramount	9	3	2	4	13	21	−8	8	
7	Transvaal	9	2	3	4	13	19	−6	7	
8	Swift	9	3	0	6	13	16	−3	6	
9	De Roode Duivels	9	1	1	7	8	25	−17	3	
10	Stormvogels	9	1	1	7	7	23	−16	3	

Rules for classification: 1) Points; 2) Head-to-head points; 3) Head-to-head goal difference; 4) Head-to-head goals scored; 5) Goal difference; 6) Goals scored
