= Ivanildo Misidjan =

Surinamese footballer (born 1993)

Personal information
- Full name: Ivanildo Astrando Misidjan
- Date of birth: 8 July 1993 (age 33)
- Place of birth: Paramaribo, Suriname
- Height: 1.74 m (5 ft 9 in)
- Position: Centre-back

Team information
- Current team: SSV HBSS

Senior career*
Years	Team	Apps	(Gls)
2010–2019	Leo Victor		
2019–2021	Broki		
2021–2022	VV Kethel Spaland		
2022–2024	Neptunus-Schiebroek		
2024–	SSV HBSS		

International career
2013	Suriname U20	6	(0)
2018–2019	Suriname	11	(0)
- * Club domestic league appearances and goals

Ivanildo Astrando Misidjan (born 8 July 1993) is a Surinamese professional footballer who plays as a centre-back for Dutch club SSV HBSS.

== International career ==
Misidjan made a total of six appearances for the Suriname U20 national team at the 2013 CONCACAF U-20 Championship in Mexico. On 18 August 2018, he made his debut for the Suriname senior team, playing in a 4–0 friendly victory over French Guiana.

== Honours ==
Leo Victor

- SVB Cup: 2013–14
- Suriname President's Cup: 2014
