= Fortuna 1975 Lelydorp =

Surinamese football club

Fortuna 1975
- Full name: Fortuna 1975 Lelydorp
- Founded: 1975
- Ground: LSB-stadion; Lelydorp
- Capacity: 1,000
Home colours	Away colours

Fortuna 1975 Lelydorp is a Surinamese football club based in Lelydorp, Suriname. They currently participate in the Surinamese Eerste Klasse, the second-highest tier of football in Suriname.
