= S.V. Coronie Boys =

Surinamese football club

Coronie Boys
- Full name: Sportvereniging Coronie Boys
- Founded: 1957
- Ground: Letitia Vriesde Sportcomplex; Totness, Suriname
- Capacity: 1,000
- League: Derde Divisie
- 2014/15: 3rd

Sportvereniging Coronie Boys is an association football club from Totness, Suriname. Having spent spells in both the Hoofdklasse and Eerste Klasse, the club currently compete in the lower divisions of Surinamese football.

== History ==
S.V. Coronie Boys were the first club from the Coronie District to compete in the SVB Hoofdklasse, breaking ground at the top flight in 1957. The team won the Randdistrictentoernooi in 1989 and Interdistrictentoernooi the following year. In the 1994–95 season, Coronie Boys finished as the league runner-up to S.V. Robinhood. They also finished as runner's up in the Suriname President's Cup to Robinhood that same year. The team currently plays their home games at the Letitia Vriesde Sportcomplex on the Totness polder to a capacity of 1,000 people.

== Achievements ==
- Hoofdklasse: 1

Runners-up: 1994–95

- Suriname President's Cup: 1

Runners-up: 1995

- Interdistrictentoernooi: 1

Winners: 1990

- Randdistrictentoernooi: 1

Winners: 1989
