= Asraf Peerkhan Stadion =

Football stadium in Nieuw Nickerie, Suriname

- Interactive map of Asraf Peerkhan Stadion
- Former names: Nickerie Voetbal Stadion
- Location: Nieuw Nickerie, Suriname
- Coordinates: 5.94253°N 56.99805°W
- Owner: Nickerie Voetbal Bond
- Capacity: 3,400
- Surface: Grass

Construction
- Opened: 18 November 1933; 92 years ago

Tenants
- S.V. Santos; S.V. Prakash; PSV Nickerie

Asraf Peerkhan Stadion, formerly the Nickerie Voetbal Stadion, is a football stadium in Nieuw Nickerie, Nickerie, Suriname. The stadium has a capacity of 3,400 visitors. It is the home stadium of Nickerie Voetbal Bond (NVB), the football union for the Nickerie District. The stadium was constructed in 1933. It used to be called Nickerie Voetbal Stadion. On 17 December 2017, the members of the NVB voted to change the name to Asraf Peerkhan Stadion in honour of Asraf Peerkhan.

Members of the NVB include S.V. Santos, S.V. Prakash, and PSV Nickerie.

Staatsolie donated US$198,000 in 2014 for the renovation of the football stadium and the neighbouring cricket grounds. The old wooden stands were replaced by concrete stands. The football field is also used by the local schools.

On 17 March 2019, the first international competition was played in the Asraf Peerkhan Stadion. The Suriname national football team beat the Guyana national football team 3–1.
