= S.V. The Young Rhythm =

Surinamese football club

Young Rhythm
- Full name: Sport Vereniging The Young Rhythm
- Ground: George Deul Stadion; Pontbuiten, Suriname
- Capacity: 1,500
- League: Eerste Klasse

Sport Vereniging The Young Rhythm is a Surinamese football club based in Pontbuiten. The club presently competes in the Eerste Klasse, the 2nd tier of Surinamese football.

In the 2003–04 SVB Hoofdklasse season, Owen van Cooten finished as the league top goal scorer with 26 goals scored while playing for Young Rhythm.

The team play their local 'Cottica derby' against crosstown rivals Wanhattie at the George Deul Stadion.
