= Surinamese Football Association =

Governing body of football on Suriname

CONCACAF
- Founded: 1 October 1920; 105 years ago
- Headquarters: Paramaribo
- FIFA affiliation: 1929
- CONCACAF affiliation: 18 September 1961 (Original Member)
- President: N/A
- Website: https://svb.sr/

The Surinamese Football Association (Dutch: Surinaamse Voetbal Bond [syːriˈnaːmsə ˈvudbɑl ˌbɔnt]) is the governing body of football in Suriname. It organizes the Surinamese football league system, the Surinamese Cup, Suriname President's Cup, Suriname national football team, and the Suriname women's national football team. It is based in Paramaribo, and is a founding member of CONCACAF and a member of FIFA.

Just like neighboring French Guiana and Guyana, Suriname are not members of the South American CONMEBOL confederation, but instead of CONCACAF, which covers North America, Central America, and the Caribbean.

== History ==
Founded on 1 October 1920, the Surinamese Football Association was not the first official football association of Suriname, their main competitor as governing body of football in the country was the NGVB (Dutch Guyanese Football Association). Prior to the foundation in 1920 there was another governing body in Suriname by the same name, which was founded 1914. There was much animosity between both associations, until president Emile de la Fuente settled their differences during the opening ceremony of the National Stadium.

With the foundation of the SVB, the development of football in the country reached new heights. It was better organized in accordance to the rules of the Dutch Football Association (NVB).

Some of those rules in the founding years included:

- A match lasts 2x25 minutes with a 5-minute break.
- There was a special committee of appointed referees.
- If the match is undecided after full-time, 10 extra minutes were awarded.

To develop a professional league in Suriname and obtain popular support for the league and national selection, the SVB signed a deal with Telecommunications Company of Suriname Telesur on 30 September 2016. In this deal Telesur's daughter company ATV has received the rights to broadcast all Surinamese matches live. In this deal ATV will also establish a program that will provide viewers with soccer news to keep them up to date with the SVB and the soccer in Suriname. This deal has been considered one of the best made so far by the SVB and will last three years.

=== Historical data and facts ===
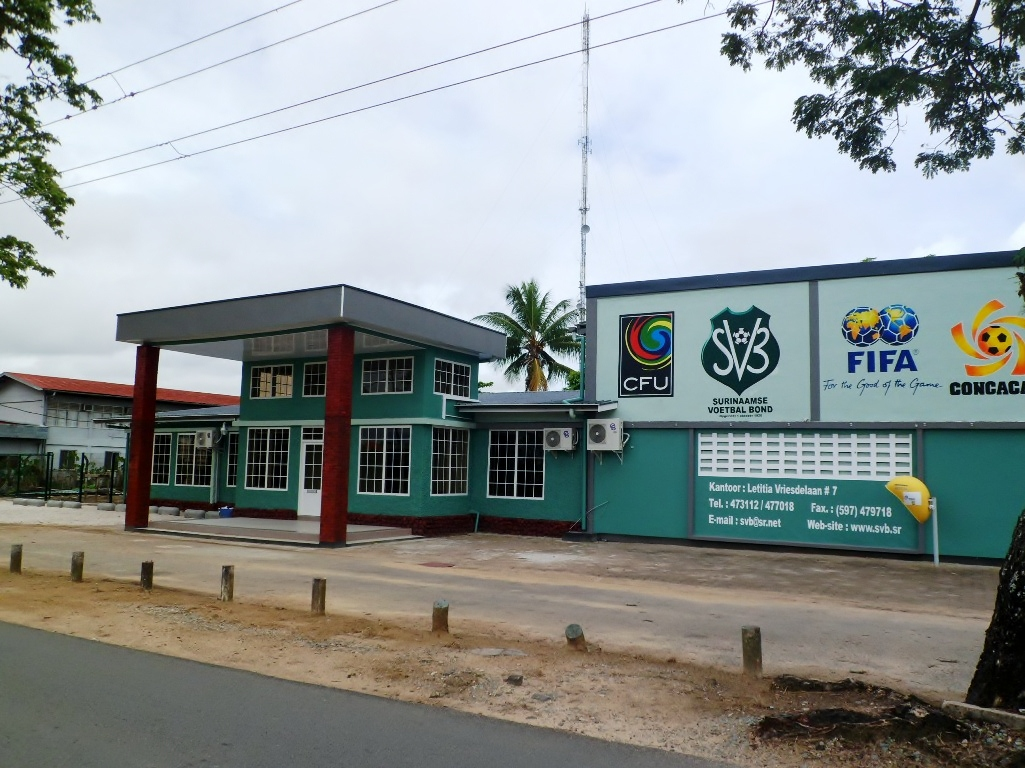
Head office in Paramaribo.

- On 28 January 1921 the first International of the Suriname national team was contested against British Guiana, Suriname lost the match 1–2.
- On 5 August 1923 the first matches were played on the Cultuurtuinlaan.
- On 27 August 1923, the Suriname national team played their second International match against British Guiana and won 2–1.
- In 1924 the first official national competition was contested. Olympia won the first national title, while SV Transvaal won the Tweede Klasse that year.
- On 18 May 1929 Suriname became an official member of FIFA, the celebration was held on 7 June 1929.
- In 1934 the first official International match since joining FIFA was contested against Curaçao, with Suriname winning 3–1.
- In 1936 a Surinamese selection travelled to Brazil for the first time.
- The first Surinamese football club to travel abroad was S.V. Voorwaarts, who traveled to Saint-Laurent-du-Maroni, French Guiana winning the match 8–0.
- Bill Bromet was the first Surinamese referee to officiate an International match.
- At the 50-year Anniversary the SVB were granted permission by Queen Juliana of the Netherlands to add the 'Royal' predicate to the associations name.

=== Staff ===
As of 2026

Name	Position	Source
(Suriname) Dayasankar Mathoera	President	
(Suriname) Faizal Abdoelgafoer	Vice President	
(Suriname) Mitchell Kisoor	General Secretary	
(Suriname) Bidjaikoemar Mankoe	Treasurer	
(Suriname) Biswajeet Kali	Technical Director	
(Netherlands) Henk ten Cate	Team Coach (Men's)	
(Suriname) Mark de Vries	Team Coach (Women's)	
(Suriname) N/A	Media/Communications Manager	
(Suriname) Bidjaikoemar Mankoe	Futsal Coordinator	
(Suriname) Ramon Louisville	Referee Coordinator	

== Member associations ==
The SVB have several member associations (Dutch, Lidbonden) who are involved in the organization and facilitation of the sport throughout the different municipalities and districts of the country. Hosting their own independent amateur leagues, the winners of each member association participate in the Lidbondentoernooi which leads to promotion to the SVB Eerste Klasse. The presidents of each member association also receive a vote in the presidency seat of the Surinamese Football Association (SVB).

#	Association	City	District	Founded
1	Albina Sport Bond (ASB)	Albina	Marowijne	-
2	Brokopondo Sport Bond (BSB)	Brokopondo	Brokopondo	-
3	Commewijne Sport Bond (CSB)	Nieuw Amsterdam	Commewijne	-
4	Moengo Sport Bond (MSB)	Moengo	Marowijne	-
5	Nickerie Voetbal Bond (NVB)	Nieuw Nickerie	Nickerie	-
6	Para Sport Bond (PSB)	Onverwacht	Para	-
7	Saramacca Sport Bond (SSB)	Groningen	Saramacca	-
8	Wageningen Sport Bond (WSB)	Wageningen	Nickerie	-
9	Sporten Vormingscentrum Blauwgrond (SVCB)	Blauwgrond	Paramaribo	-
10	Kwatta Sport Bond (KSB)	Kwatta	Wanica	-
11	Domburg Sport Bond (DSB)	Domburg	Wanica	-
12	Meerzorg Sport Bond (MSB)	Meerzorg	Commewijne	-
13	Nieuwe Generatie Voetbal Bond (NGVB)	Paramaribo	Paramaribo	1930
14	Wanica Sport Organisatie (WSO)	Lelydorp	Wanica	-
15	Sport Organisatie Leidingen Omgeving (SOLO)	Paramaribo	Paramaribo	-
16	Livorno Sport Organisatie (LSO)	Livorno	Paramaribo	-
17	Lelydorp Sport Bond (LSB)	Lelydorp	Wanica	1950
18	Coronie Sport Bond (CSB)	Totness	Coronie	-
