= S.V. Prakash =

Surinamese football club

Prakash
- Full name: Sport Vereniging Prakash
- Ground: Nickerie Voetbal Stadion; Nieuw Nickerie
- Capacity: 3,400
- League: Lidbondentoernooi

Sport Vereniging Prakash is a Surinamese football club based in Nieuw Nickerie. The club presently competes in the 1e Klasse of the Nickerie Voetbal Bond and the Lidbondentoernooi. They have previously played in the Hoofdklasse and the Eerste Klasse, having made one appearance in the CONCACAF Champions' Cup, where they lost in the Second round to SV Transvaal.

== History ==
Prakash were founded by Balkaran ‘Balie’ Mangroe in Nieuw Nickerie where they play their home games at the Nickerie Voetbal Stadion to a capacity of 3,400. The team have played in the Hoofdklasse and the Eerste Klasse, the 1st and 2nd tier of football in Suriname, having also qualified for the 1996 CONCACAF Champions' Cup. In their first Continental berth. The team faced US Sinnamary from French Guiana in the first round of the Caribbean region drawing a goalless draw in the first match facing local giants SV Transvaal in the second round. Prakash were able to draw 0–0 in Nieuw Nickerie, losing the return match 1–0 in Paramaribo. Since the 2008 season Prakash have been competing in the NVB district league.

== Performance in CONCACAF competitions ==
- 1996 CONCACAF Champions' Cup

First round v. (French Guiana) US Sinnamary – 0:0, -:-^{1}
Second round v. (Suriname) Transvaal – 0:0, 0:1

1. US Sinnamary Withdrew after the 1st round.
