= Letitia Vriesde Sportcomplex =

- Interactive map of Letitia Vriesde Sportcomplex
- Location: Totness, Suriname
- Coordinates: 5.883935°N 56.334854°W
- Owner: Coronie District
- Operator: Coronie Sport Bond
- Capacity: 1,000
- Surface: Grass

Tenants
- Corona; Coronie Boys; West United

Letitia Vriesde Sportcomplex is a multi-purpose stadium in Totness, Suriname. It is home to SVB Eerste Klasse club F.C. West United. Former top flight clubs and Coronie Sport Bond (CSB) members F.C. Corona and S.V. Coronie Boys are also tenants of the stadium.

The stadium was named after Letitia Vriesde, a female former track and field athlete from the Coronie District who became the first Surinamese sports person to compete at five Olympic Games.

== Location ==
The Letitia Vriesde Sportcomplex is located in the Northwest of Totness on the Botromankiweg right off of the Oost-West Verbinding (English, East-West Connector), just west of the Coronie Airport.
