= V.V. Cicerone =

Defunct surinamese football club

Cicerone
- Full name: Voetbal Vereniging Cicerone
- Founded: 22 January 1929; 97 years ago
- Dissolved: 1958
- Ground: Suriname Stadion, Paramaribo, Suriname
- Capacity: 3,000
- League: –
- 1957–58: Tweede Klasse, 8th
Home colours	Away colours

Voetbal Vereniging Cicerone, known as Cicerone, was a Surinamese football club based in Paramaribo that last played in the Tweede Klasse, in the 1957–58 season.

== History ==
Cicerone was founded as an artistic dance club on 26 October 1910. Over the years the club evolved into a multisports club, including a Korfball, Football and Basketball team. The football branch was founded on 22 January 1929 in Paramaribo, Suriname, Cicerone are an older football club, and one of the first clubs to compete in the Hoofdklasse, the highest level of football in the country, winning the National title four seasons in a row from 1931 to 1935. They have also won the Dragten Cup twice, the Emancipation Cup twice, and the Bueno Cup once. In 1933, Cicerone played the first match against a Venezuelan club in Suriname, when they played Deportivo Español on 2 September 1933 in a 1–1 draw. It was Cicerone's 25th consecutive match unbeaten (21 wins, 4 draws) losing the following match 1–0 to Voorwaarts.

Notable former players of Cicerone from the clubs' period at the top flight in Suriname include Charles Naloop, R. Pinas, Leo Rijzenburg, C. Cairo, Charles Wijdenbosch, Richard Wijdenbosch, J. Eendragt, Anton Balrak, Bil Bromet, Cornelis Naloop, and Eugene René Enz. The first chairman of the club was O. Stenhuys, while the teams' talent scout was Jurion Henny Stenhuys who recruited players from around the Gonggrijpstraat and the Prinssessestraat in the Capital city.

== Achievements ==
- SVB Hoofdklasse: 4

1932, 1933, 1934, 1935

- Dragtenbeker: 2

1932, 1933

- Emancipatiebeker: 2

1933, 1936

- Cup Bueno: 1

1933
