= Eddy Blackman Stadion =

- Interactive map of Eddy Blackman Stadion
- Location: Livorno, Suriname
- Coordinates: 5°46′29″N 55°10′21″W
- Owner: City and District of Paramaribo
- Operator: Livorno Sport Organisatie
- Capacity: 2,000
- Surface: Grass

Construction
- Architect: Badrinath Durga

Tenants
- Takdier Boys; Jai Hanuman; Kamal Dewaker

Eddy Blackman Stadion is a multi-purpose stadium in Livorno, Suriname. It is home to SVB Hoofdklasse club SCSV Takdier Boys and SVB Eerste Klasse outfits, SV Jai Hanuman and SCSV Kamal Dewaker.

The stadium was built by Badrinath Durga, who has been committed to the social development of Livorno for many years.

== Location ==
The Eddy Blackman Stadium is located in the Northwest of Livorno on the Botromankiweg right off of the Martin Luther Kingweg, just south of the capital city Paramaribo.
