= S.C.S.V. Kamal Dewaker =

Surinamese football club

Kamal Dewaker
- Full name: Sociaal Culturele Sportvereniging Kamal Dewaker
- Founded: 15 August 1941; 83 years ago
- Ground: Eddy Blackman Stadion
- Capacity: 2,000
- League: Tweede Divisie
- 2022–23: Tweede Divisie, 10th

SCSV Kamal Dewaker is a Surinamese football club based in Livorno. The club plays in the Tweede Divisie, the second tier of football in the nation. The club was founded on August 15, 1941.

== Current squad 2011–12 ==
Note: Flags indicate national team as defined under FIFA eligibility rules; some limited exceptions apply. Players may hold more than one non-FIFA nationality.

No.	Pos.	Nation	Player
—	DF	(Suriname) SUR	Zhirvano Darson
