= N.G.V.B. =

Surinamese football association

NGVB
- Association: Surinamese Football Association
- Confederation: CONCACAF
- Home stadium: Mgr. Aloysius Zichem Sportcentrum
- FIFA code: NGVB (not official)

The Nieuwe Generatie Voetbal Bond (New Generation Football Association) or N.G.V.B. is a member association of the Surinamese Football Association founded on 1 January 1930.

== History ==
The N.G.V.B. was founded on 10 August 1924 as the Katholieke Voetbal Bond (Catholic Football Association) or K.V.B., but officially changed their name to the Nederlandsch Guyana Voetbal Bond (Dutch Guyanese Football Association) on 1 January 1930.

Prior to the foundation of the Catholic Football Association, there was another Catholic governing body of football in Suriname, namely the Katholieke Sport Centrale (Catholic Sports Center). Founded on 25 June 1919, the Catholic Sports Center hosted football matches on the football grounds behind the St. Petrus and Paulus Cathedral on the Gravenstraat. This organization ceased to exist in 1921.

The NGBV was the primary representative of association football in Suriname in the early years of the sport. It was the first association to travel abroad, traveling to British Guyana in May 1925. The N.G.V.B selection reached its height in the 1930s when players such as Hans Nahar, John Wessels, Holband, Michel Kersout, Gerrit Schoonhoven, the De Vieira brothers and the De Chehin brothers, represented the association internationally. The association was commonly called the 'Patro', having brought forth such teams as MYOB (Mind Your Own Business), Olympia, Boys, Xerxes, Hallo and SDO.

The N.G.V.B. saw a steep decline in relevancy until 1954, when they joined the SVB as a member association. The N.G.V.B. were responsible for hosting tournaments and league games among the youth teams of the various clubs and districts in the country. The name of the association was changed that year to Nieuwe Generatie Voetbal Bond (New Generation Football Association).

In 1961, Martin Dongen joined the N.G.V.B, taking full control of managing the youth department.

On 4 June 1961 the N.G.V.B. Stadion (now Mgr. Aloysius Zichem Sportcentrum) was opened, providing N.G.V.B. with a new home stadium.

=== Rivalry ===
The N.G.V.B. and S.V.B. are the top two football associations in the country, and have a strong rivalry.

Following the foundation of the Surinaamse Voetbal Bond (SVB, Surinamese Football Association) in 1920 and their joining of FIFA, the global governing body of football, the rivalry of the two associations intensified. The N.G.V.B. was at a disadvantage due to not being internationally recognized.

== Associations Aims ==
- To promote association football in Suriname and to play football in Suriname and propagate the various game systems, and to exercise the oversight there of as the official governing body.
- To act as governing body and reach Inter-colonial and International agreements in terms of football games in Suriname.
- To honor the technical and moral needs of all association members.

== Tournament Records ==
=== Walcot Cup ===
The N.G.V.B. won the Walcot Cup held in British Guiana in 1931, 1932, 1936, and 1937.

N.G.V.B. results at the 1932 Walcot Cup

2 March 1932	NGVB	3–3	British Guiana	Georgetown, British Guiana
	Nahar; Kersout	Report

5 March 1932	NGVB	2–1	British Guiana	Georgetown, British Guiana
	Nahar; Kersout	Report

7 March 1932	NGVB	1–3	British Guiana	Georgetown, British Guiana
	Schoonhoven	Report

N.G.V.B. results at the 1937 Walcot Cup

31 August 1937	NGVB	1–0	British Guiana	Georgetown, British Guiana
		Report

1 September 1937	NGVB	2–0	British Guiana	Georgetown, British Guiana
		Report

2 September 1937	NGVB	2–1	British Guiana	Georgetown, British Guiana
	Nahar	Report

The winning 1937 selection consisted of the following players:

1937 Walcot Cup Starting Lineup
- (Netherlands) Drielinger (GK) - (Olympia)
- (Netherlands) Pinas (DF) - (Surinam)
- (Netherlands) Vieira (DF) - (Mariënburg)
- (Netherlands) Holtuin (MF) - (Olympia)
- (Netherlands) Moe (MF) - (Olympia)
- (Netherlands) Tjon Poen Tjoe (MF) - (Mariënburg)
- (Netherlands) Henricus (FW) - (Mariënburg)
- (Netherlands) Kersout (FW) - (Mariënburg)
- (Netherlands) Schoonhoven (FW) - (MYOB)
- (Netherlands) Nahar (FW) - (Mariënburg)
- (Netherlands) Veldhuizen (FW) - (Mariënburg)

On the bench: W. Amo, Suydon, F. Purperhart, Profijt, Cameron, Kersout and Goudmijn.
Coaches: J. Wessels and J. Chehin

=== National competition ===
Apart from participating in international tournaments, The N.G.V.B. also organized an annual competition for the national championship, running parallel to the SVB Hoofdklasse. RKVV Olympia won the championship in 1928 and Hallo won in 1929.

1936 N.G.V.B. final standings
Pos	Team	Pld	W	D	L	GF	GA	GD	Pts
1	Boys (C)	13	10	2	1	33	11	+22	32
2	Mariënburg	13	8	1	4	21	12	+9	25
3	Olympia	13	7	2	4	20	18	+2	23
4	MYOB	13	5	2	6	21	27	−6	17
5	Hallo	13	5	1	7	21	27	−6	16
6	Surinam	13	4	2	7	9	15	−6	14
7	Fearless	13	2	3	8	13	23	−10	9

Updated to match(es) played on 31 May 1936. Source: dbnl.org
Rules for classification: 1) points; 2) goal difference; 3) number of goals scored.
(C) Champions

=== Other tournaments ===
Apart from the N.G.V.B. national competition, the association also organized the Neptune Beker (Neptune Cup), the Olympia Toernooi (Olympia Tournament) and the Anna Margaretha competition. The Anna Margaretha competition was won by Boys in 1936, and by Mariënburg the following year.

=== Friendly matches ===
In May 1936, the N.G.V.B. traveled to British Guiana with a selection of their best players for a series of friendly matches, yielding the following results:

4 May 1936	NGVB	0–1	Guyana Football Club	Georgetown, British Guiana
		Report

6 May 1936	NGVB	1–1	BGFA	Georgetown, British Guiana
		Report

8 May 1936	NGVB	3–2	Artillerie	Georgetown, British Guiana
		Report

11 May 1936	NGVB	1–1	Victoria	Georgetown, British Guiana
		Report

13 May 1936	NGVB	2–1	Berbice	Georgetown, British Guiana
		Report

15 May 1936	NGVB	2–1	BGFA	Georgetown, British Guiana
		Report

The N.G.V.B. players were: A. Drielingen, A. Vieira, Ch. van Aals, M. Holtuin, J. Haakmat, Riboet, J. Tjon Poen Tjoen, M. Kersout, A. Rayman, L. Kluivert, F. Veldhuizen, C. Corte, R. King, F. Gomes, H. Pinas, E. van West, J. Tjon A Tjauw, G. Schoonhoven (capt.) and J. Amo.

== See also ==
- N.G.V.B. Stadion
- Surinaamse Voetbal Bond
