= Football in Suriname =

- Country: Suriname
- Governing body: Surinamese Football Association
- National team: Men's national team
- First played: 1862

National competitions
- Suriname Major League; Topklasse; Hoofdklasse; Lidbondentoernooi; Vrouwenvoetbal Competitie

Club competitions
- Surinamese Cup

International competitions
- CONCACAF Champions League; CONCACAF League; Caribbean Club Shield; FIFA Club World Cup; CONCACAF Gold Cup (National Team); CONCACAF Nations League (National Team); FIFA World Cup (National Team); CONCACAF Women's Championship (National Team); FIFA Women's World Cup (National Team)

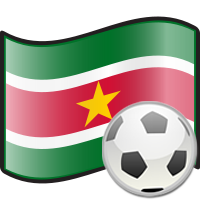
Icon for football in Suriname

Football is the most popular sport in Suriname, with around 55% of the people in the country considered football fans. The sport of football in the country of Suriname is run by the Surinamese Football Association. The association administers the national football team, as well as the national football league.

Since the launch of professional football on February 22, 2024, ten teams are competing in the professional Suriname Major League.

== National team ==
The 1978 FIFA World Cup was the nearest the national team got to qualifying a major world tournament. The national team has lost potential players to the Netherlands.

== Attendances ==
The average attendance per top-flight football league season and the club with the highest average attendance:

| Season | League average | Best club | Best club average |
|---|---|---|---|
| 2025 | 240 | Robinhood | 467 |

Source: League page on Wikipedia
