= S.V. Cosmos =

Surinamese football club

Cosmos
- Full name: Sport Vereniging Cosmos
- Founded: 4 September 2002; 24 years ago
- Ground: Dr. Ir. Franklin Essed Stadion, Paramaribo, Suriname
Home colours

Sport Vereniging Cosmos, known as SV Cosmos, is a Surinamese football club. They play their home games in Paramaribo at the Frank Essed Stadium.

They were relegated from the Hoofdklasse in 2006–07 and again relegated, from the Eerste Klasse, the following season. The club were formerly known as S.V. Road, before changing their name to Cosmos.
