= F.C. West United =

Surinamese football club

West United
- Full name: Football Club West United
- Founded: 10 October 2011; 15 years ago
- Ground: Letitia Vriesde Sportcomplex; Totness, Suriname
- Capacity: 1,000
- League: Eerste Divisie
- 2019–20: 9th
Home colours

Football Club West United is a Surinamese football club based in Totness, Coronie District, Suriname. The club presently compete in the Eerste Klasse, the 2nd tier of Surinamese football.

== History ==
In 2013 the team won the Lidbondentoernooi, defeating Deva Boys and thus promoting to the Eerste Klasse, the 2nd tier of football in Suriname. The team finished in tenth place in the first season.

In 2014 the team made it to the Semi-finals of the Surinamese Cup by defeating the Deva Boys in the quarterfinals. In the Semi-finals the team lost to Notch from Moengo.

In 2015 West United were paired with Notch once more in the first round of the Surinamese Cup. This time however West United were able to defeat Notch, thus progressing in the tournament by eliminating last years runner-up of the competition.

== Honours ==
- SVB Lidbondentoernooi: 1
  - 2013
- SVB Eerste Klasse: 1
  - 2016–17
