= F.C.S. Nacional =

FCS Nacional
- Full name: Federatie Culturele Sportvereniging Nacional
- Founded: 22 February 1960; 66 years ago, as SV Boxel; 9 October 2000; 25 years ago, name changed to FCS Nacional
- Dissolved: 22 December 2013; 12 years ago, merged with SV Deva Boys, name changed to Nacional Deva Boys
- Ground: Nacionello Stadion, Houttuin, Suriname
- Capacity: 1,500
Home colours

FCS Nacional is a Surinamese football club. They were relegated from the Surinamese Eerste Klasse, the second tier of football in Suriname, in 2012. They played their home games in Houttuin, Wanica District at the Nacionello Stadion. In 2013 the club merged with S.V. Deva Boys to form Nacional Deva Boys.

== History ==
- 2000: the club is renamed FCS Nacional from SV Boxel
- 2010: the club is relegated for the first time under the name FCS Nacional, after withdrawing from the league
- 2013: the club merges with Deva Boys under the name Nacional Deva Boys

== Notable former coaches ==
- (Suriname) Andy Atmodimedjo (2007–2008)

== Achievements ==
- Hoofdklasse
  - Champions (1): 2003
- Beker van Suriname
  - Champions (1): 2005
- Suriname President's Cup
  - Winners (1): 2005
