= R.K.V.V. Olympia =

Olympia
- Full name: Rooms Katholieke Voetbal Vereniging Olympia
- Founded: 27 July 1919; 106 years ago
- Dissolved: 1965
- Ground: Katholieke Sport Centrale, Centrum, Suriname
- Capacity: 1,000

Rooms Katholieke Voetbal Vereniging Olympia, known as Olympia, was a Surinamese football club based in Centrum, Paramaribo that played in the Hoofdklasse, the highest level of football in Suriname. In 1923 the club became the first official national champion of Suriname.

== History ==
Olympia was founded as a Roman Catholic club on 27 January 1919, two days after the inauguration of their sporting grounds, the Katholieke Sport Centrale. Situated on the Patronaatterrein, the Katholieke Sport Centrale had been established as a replacement for the Gouvernementsplein as the primary playing field for organized football matches in Paramaribo at the time.

The club were able to secure the first two official National championships of the SVB Hoofdklasse in 1923 and 1924. Many of the competing clubs at the time were under the impression that there was a religious bias at the Katholieke Sport Centrale towards the club, and that religious dogma tainted the competition. Olympia played at the top flight of the competition for the most part of the first half of the 20th century, having seen their best period in the formative years of the sport, relegating to the lower divisions in the sixties, before folding shortly thereafter.

== Achievements ==
- SVB Hoofdklasse: 2

1923, 1923–24
