= S.V. Jai Hanuman =

Surinamese football club

Jai Hanuman
- Full name: Sporting Vereniging Jai Hanuman
- Founded: 18 January 1954; 71 years ago
- Ground: Eddy Blackman Stadion; Paramaribo
- Capacity: 2,000
- Owner: V. Hardwarsing
- Manager: Ricardo Peneux
- League: Eerste Klasse
Home colours

Sporting Vereniging Jai Hanuman is a Surinamese football club based in Livorno. The club presently competes in the Eerste Klasse, the 2nd tier of Surinamese football. The club is a part of the Livorno Sportorganisatie (LSO), and the owner is V. Hardwarsing.

Named after the Hindu God Hanuman, Jai Hanuman earned promotion into the Hoofdklasse after winning the Surinamese Eerste Klasse in 2006. They finished in 5th place in the 2006–07 Hoofdklasse season, with Brazilian striker Alex Pereira Soares finishing as the league's top goal scorer with 28 goals scored.

== Honours ==
- SVB Eerste Klasse: 1 (2006)
