= S.V. Deva Boys =

Deva Boys
- Full name: Sport Vereniging Deva Boys
- Founded: 22 May 1966
- Ground: Dr. Ir. Franklin Essed Stadion
- Capacity: 1,000
- League: SVB Tweede Divisie
- 2019–20: 8th
Home colours	Away colours

Sport Vereniging Deva Boys is a Surinamese football club. They play their home games in Paramaribo, at the Dr. Ir. Franklin Essed Stadion.

== History ==
Deva Boys was founded on 22 May 1966.

On 22 December 2013 the club merged with F.C.S. Nacional into the Nacional Deva Boys. The merger later split.
