= S.C.S. Randjiet Boys =

Surinamese football club

Randjiet Boys
- Full name: Sociaal Cultureel en Sportvereniging Randjiet Boys
- Ground: Dr. Ir. Franklin Essed Stadium, Paramaribo, Suriname
- Capacity: 3500
- 2013–14: Eerste Klasse, 11th (relegated)
Home colours

SCS Randjiet Boys is a Surinamese football club. They play their home games at the 3,500-capacity Dr. Ir. Franklin Essed Stadium in Paramaribo. They were relegated from the Hoofdklasse in 2012–13 and again relegated, from the Eerste Klasse, the following season.
