= S.C.S.V. Takdier Boys =

Surinamese football club

Takdier Boys
- Full name: Sociaal Cultureel Sport Vereniging Takdier Boys
- Founded: 15 August 1952; 72 years ago
- Ground: Eddy Blackman Stadion, Livorno, Suriname
- Capacity: 2,000
- League: Hoofdklasse
- 2015–16: 8th
Home colours

Sociaal Cultureel Sport Vereniging Takdier Boys also SCSV Takdier Boys or simply Takdier Boys, are a Surinamese football (soccer) club from Livorno, Suriname founded in 1952. The club compete in the Hoofdklasse, the highest level of football in Suriname.

In 2010 the club made it to the finals of the Surinamese Cup which they lost 2–0 to SV Excelsior.
