= Nacional Deva Boys =

Surinamese football club

- Full name: Nacional Deva Boys
- Founded: 22 February 1960; 66 years ago, as SV Boxel; 9 October 2000; 25 years ago, name changed to FCS Nacional; 22 December 2013; 12 years ago, merged with SV Deva Boys, name changed to Nacional Deva Boys
- Ground: Nacionello Stadion, Houttuin, Suriname
- Capacity: 1,500
- Chairman: Hemant Bobby jr. Jaikaran
- Manager: (Suriname) Soekerie Soewirjo
- League: SVB Eerste Klasse
- 2016: 2nd

Nacional Deva Boys is a Surinamese football club. The club evolved out of the merger of FCS Nacional and S.V. Deva Boys on 22 December 2013.

They play their home games in Houttuin, Wanica District at the Nacionello Stadion.

== History ==
In 2000, the club was renamed FCS Nacional from SV Boxel. After having withdrawn from the league, the club was relegated for the first time under the name FCS Nacional in 2010. In 2013, FCS Nacional and S.V. Deva Boys merged to form Nacional Deva Boys.

== Notable former coaches ==
- (Suriname) Andy Atmodimedjo (2007–2008)

== Achievements ==
- Hoofdklasse:

2003^{1}

- Beker van Suriname:

2005^{1}

- Suriname President's Cup:

2005^{1}

1. Trophies won as FCS Nacional.
