= Totness, Suriname =

Totness
- Resort and town
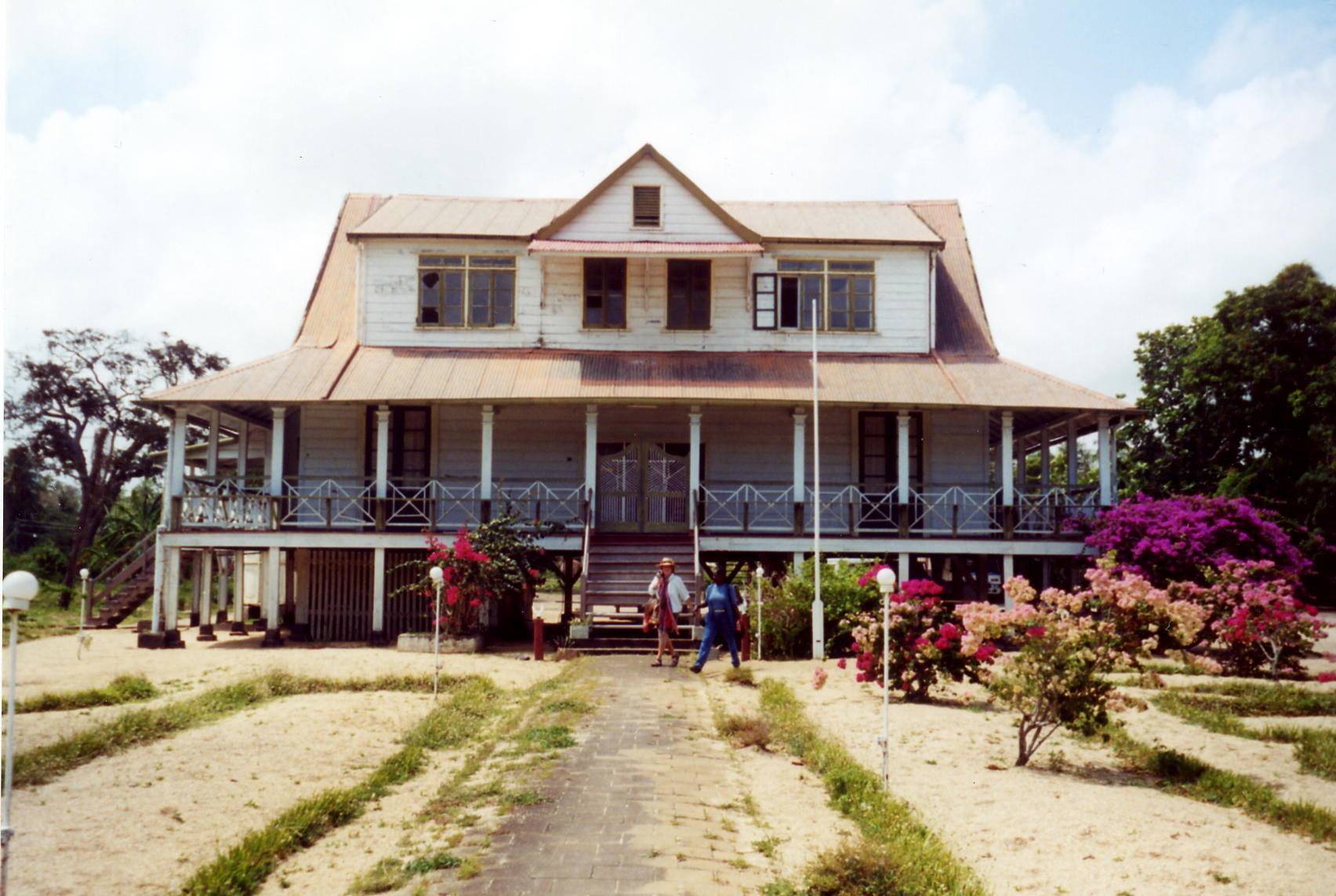
- District Commissioner's Office in Totness

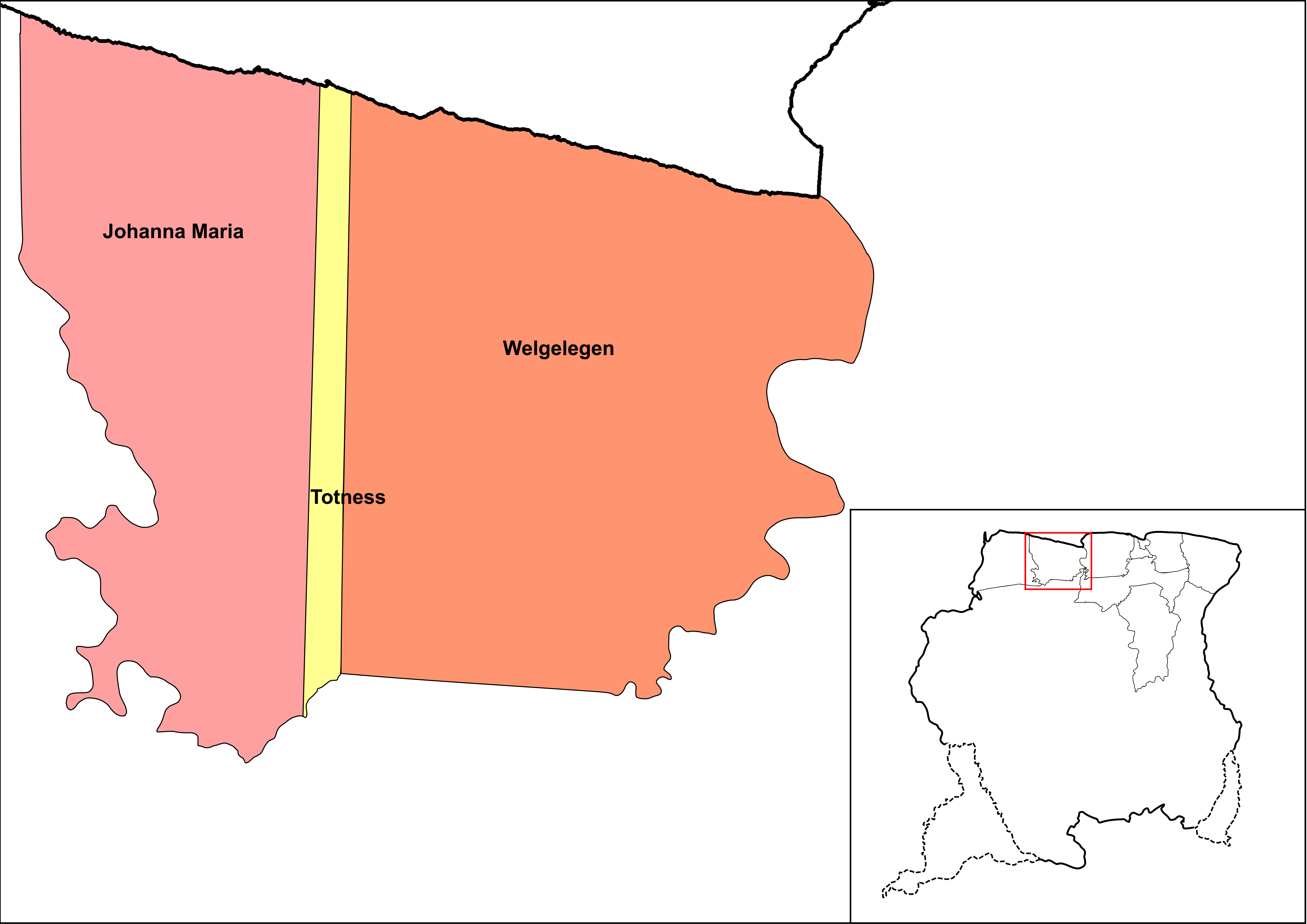
- Map showing the resorts of Coronie District. Totness is in yellow
- Coordinates: 5°52′39″N 56°19′45″W
- Country: Suriname
- District: Coronie District
- Settled: 1808

Area
  - Total: 173 km^{2} (67 sq mi)
- Elevation: 0 m (0 ft)

Population (2012)
  - Total: 2,150
  - Density: 12.4/km^{2} (32.2/sq mi)
- Time zone: UTC-03:00 (SRT)

Totness is a town in Suriname, located in the Coronie district, of which it is the capital. Totness is the oldest settlement in the district.

== History ==
Totness was settled by Scottish and English colonists from 1808 onward, and is named after Totnes, England. In 1863, the area around Totness was designated for independent agriculture. A market and a District Commissioner's Office on the former plantation Friendship were added to the resort. In the 1940s, a road was built linking Totness with Paramaribo which is nowadays part of the East-West Link.

The Suriname-Guyana Submarine Cable System has its landing station in Totness. It connects the telecommunications networks in Suriname with those in Guyana and Trinidad and from Trinidad to the rest of the world. The Totness Airstrip is one of the oldest airports in Suriname, in use since 1953, when the Piper Cub (PZ-NAC) of Kappel-van Eyck named "Colibri" landed there from Zorg en Hoop Airport.

Totness has been designated as a regional centre, and is planned to be upgrade with a medium sized hotel and a proper city centre. The village of Friendship is located is on the north side of the East-West link, and Totness is to the south.

== Sports ==
The Letitia Vriesde Sportcomplex is a multi-purpose stadium located in Totness. It is home to SVB Eerste Klasse club F.C. West United.

== Tata Colin ==
Tata Colin (circa 1806 - 1836) was a slave on the plantation Leasowes near Totness. In 1835, he attempted a slave rebellion. His intention was to free all the slaves, but he was betrayed, taken to Paramaribo where he was tortured and tried. Colin was taken to Fort Zeelandia to be hung, but died or vanished using black magic, before his sentence was carried out. His followers were sentenced to hard labour or public corporal punishment.

A statue had been erected to Tata Colin in the central square of Totness, and the local school had been named after him.

== Notable people ==
- Jozef Slagveer (1940–1982), journalist, and a victim of the December murders.
- Michaël Slory (1935–2018), poet mainly in Sranan Tongo
- Ervin Tjon-A-Loi (born 1995), footballer
- Letitia Vriesde (born 1964), athlete
- Emile Wijntuin (1924–2020), Chairman of the National Assembly of Suriname.

== Gallery ==
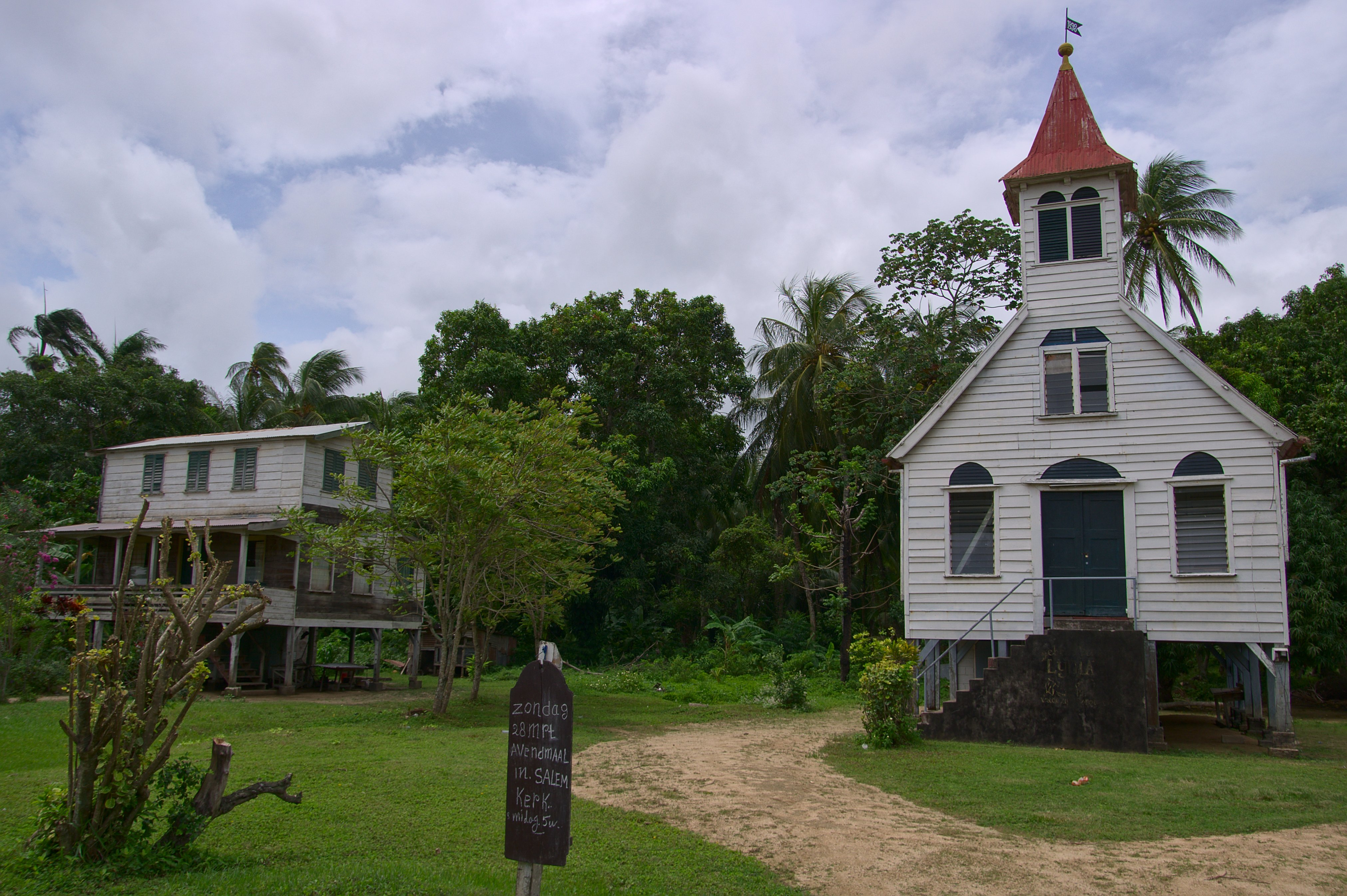
Church of Totness

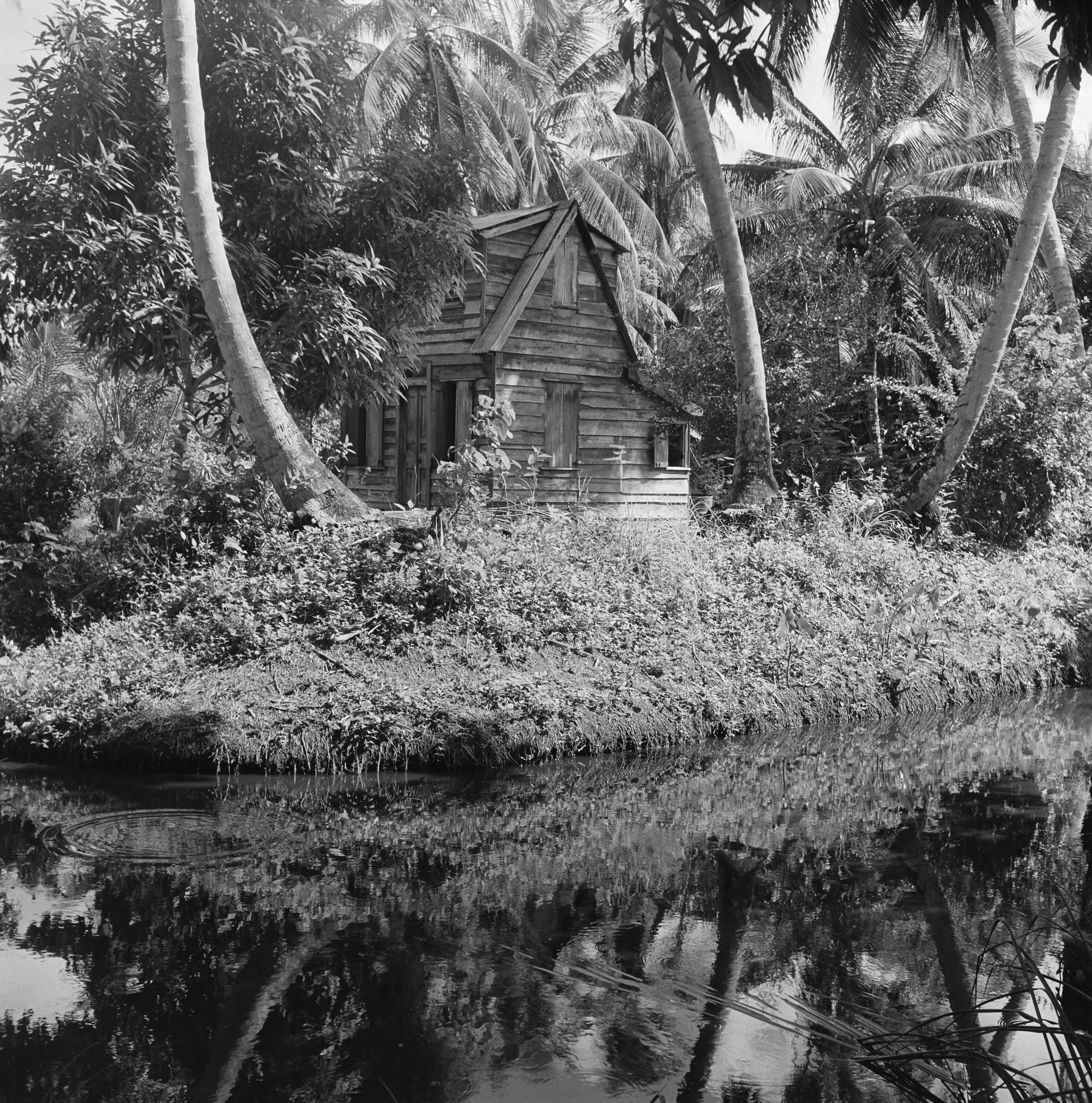
Hidden house (1967)

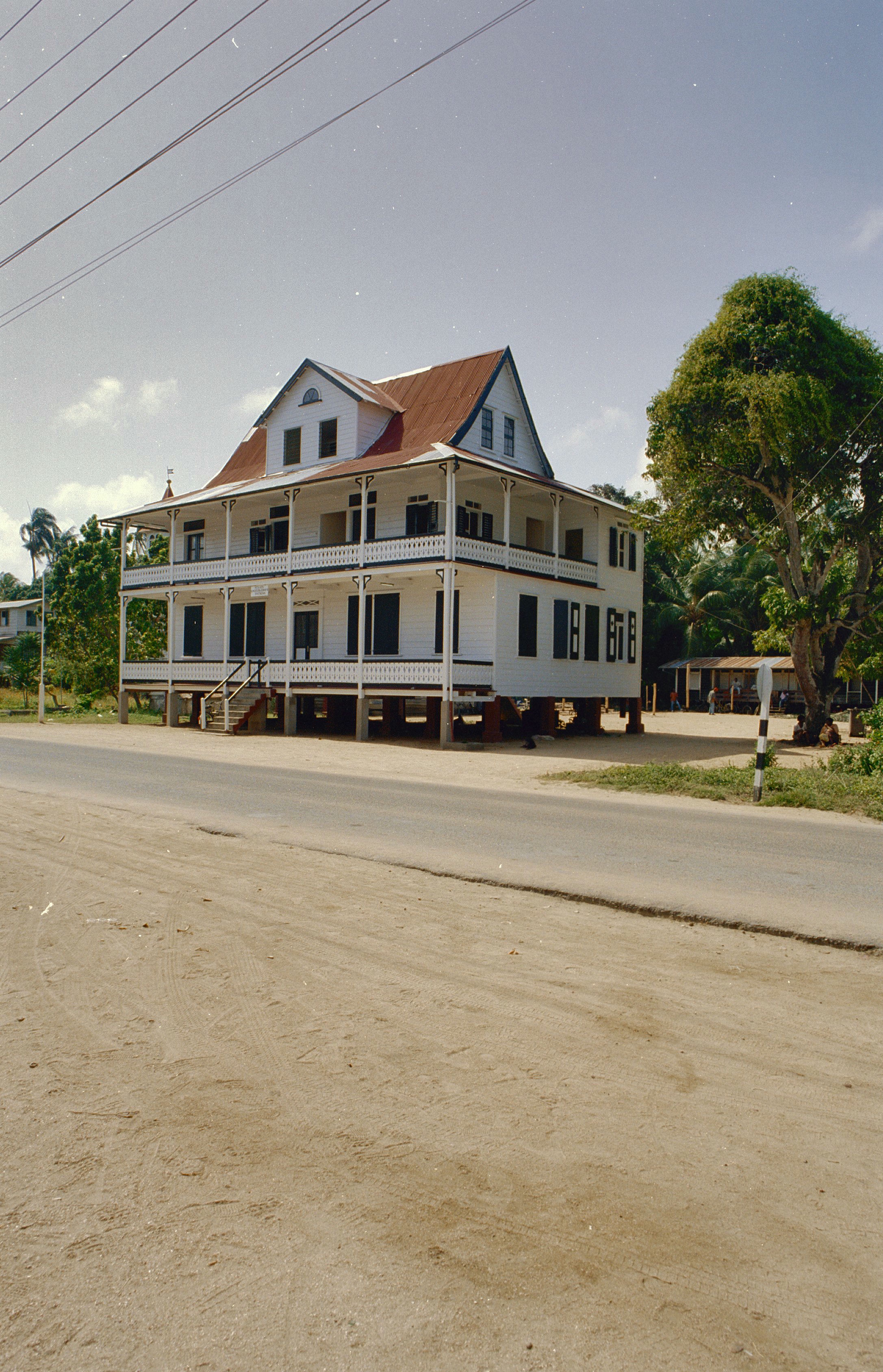
House in Totness

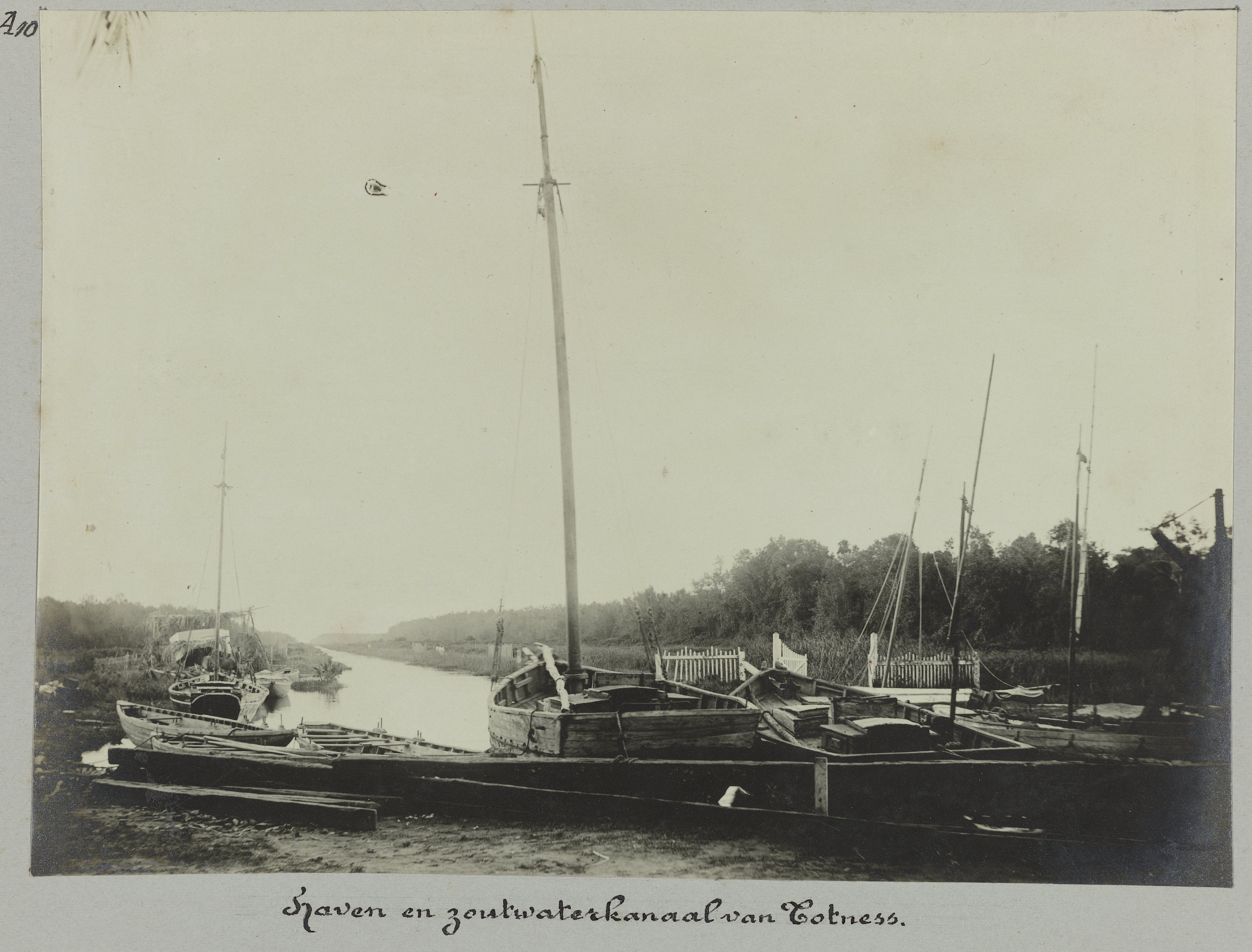
Harbour of Totness (1906-1913)
