= S.V. Jong Rambaan =

Surinamese football club

Jong Rambaan
- Full name: Sport Vereniging Jong Rambaan
- Founded: 1 January 1944; 82 years ago
- Ground: LSB Stadion; Lelydorp, Suriname
- Capacity: 1,000
- Chairman: Kriesne Biharie
- Manager: Edmund Mohan Ramkisoen
- League: Topklasse
- 2016–17: 10th
| Home colours | Away colours |

Sport Vereniging Jong Rambaan is a Surinamese football club based in Lelydorp. The club presently competes in the Topklasse, the top tier of Surinamese football.

== History ==
S.V. Jong Rambaan are a club from Lelydorp, Suriname who play at the LSB Stadion to a capacity of 1,000 people.

== Honours ==
- Lidbondentoernooi: 1

2014

== Notable coaches ==
- (Suriname) Edmund Mohan Ramkisoen
