= S.V. Papatam =

Surinamese football club

Papatam
- Full name: Sport Vereniging Papatam
- Founded: 1994; 32 years ago
- Ground: Albina Stadion; Albina, Suriname
- Capacity: 1,000
- Chairman: Marinus Bee
- League: Tweede Divisie
- 2019/20: 13th
Home colours

Sport Vereniging Papatam is an association football club from Albina, Suriname. The club currently compete in the Tweede Divisie, the 2nd tier of football in Suriname. In 2013 their home stadium the Albina Stadium was completed by the Albina Sport Bond, with a capacity of 1,000 people.

== Achievements ==
- Interdistrictentoernooi

Winners: 1997
Runner-up: 2004

- Lidbondentoernooi

Runner-up: 2012
