= S.V. Botopasi =

Surinamese football club

Botopasi
- Full name: Sport Vereniging Botopasi
- Founded: 12 February 1994; 32 years ago
- Ground: Mgr. Aloysius Zichem Sportcentrum; Paramaribo
- Capacity: 3,000
- League: Eerste Divisie
- 2022–23: Tweede Divisie, 5th of 10
Home colours

Sport Vereniging Botopasi is a Surinamese football club based in Botopasi, Sipaliwini. They currently play in the Eerste Divisie, the second division of Surinamese football and are the only Sipaliwinese club to play in the top tier.

== Stadium ==
Botopasi currently have no football stadium in the village. The training grounds of the club is a football field which is also used as a landing strip for small airplanes. The team currently play their official matches in the Mgr. Aloysius Zichem Sportcentrum in the Capital Paramaribo.
