= S.C.S.V. Bomastar =

Surinamese football club

Bomastar
- Full name: Sociaal Culturele Sportvereniging Bomastar
- Ground: Bomastar Sportscomplex
- Capacity: 1,250
- League: Eerste Klasse
- 2015/16: 10th
Home colours

SCSV Bomastar, known as Bomastar is a Surinamese football club from Lelydorp that plays in the SVB Eerste Klasse, the second tier of Surinamese football.

== History ==
Formerly known as HOB (House Of Billiards), SCSV Bomastar were born after the relegation of the former club from the SVB Hoofdklasse after the 2005–06 season. In 2014 the club won the SVB Eerste Klasse title, promoting back to the top flight. Only to be relegated once more by the end of the following season.

== Achievements ==
- SVB Eerste Klasse: 1

2013–14
