= Kwatta =

Coordinates: 5°51′22″N 55°15′40″W

- Resort
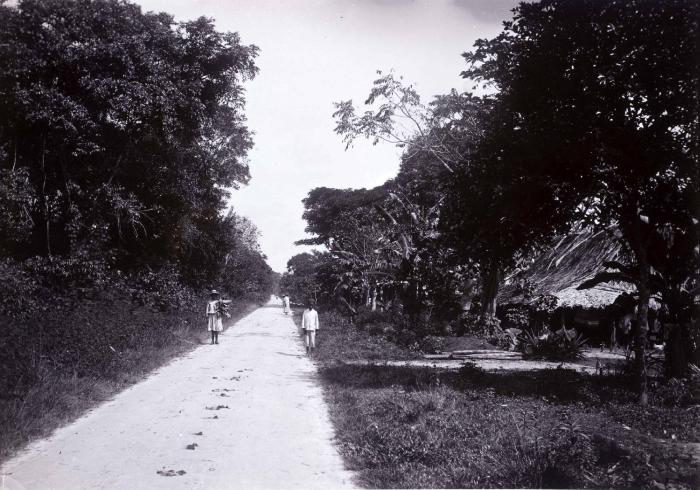
- Kwattaweg (1920)

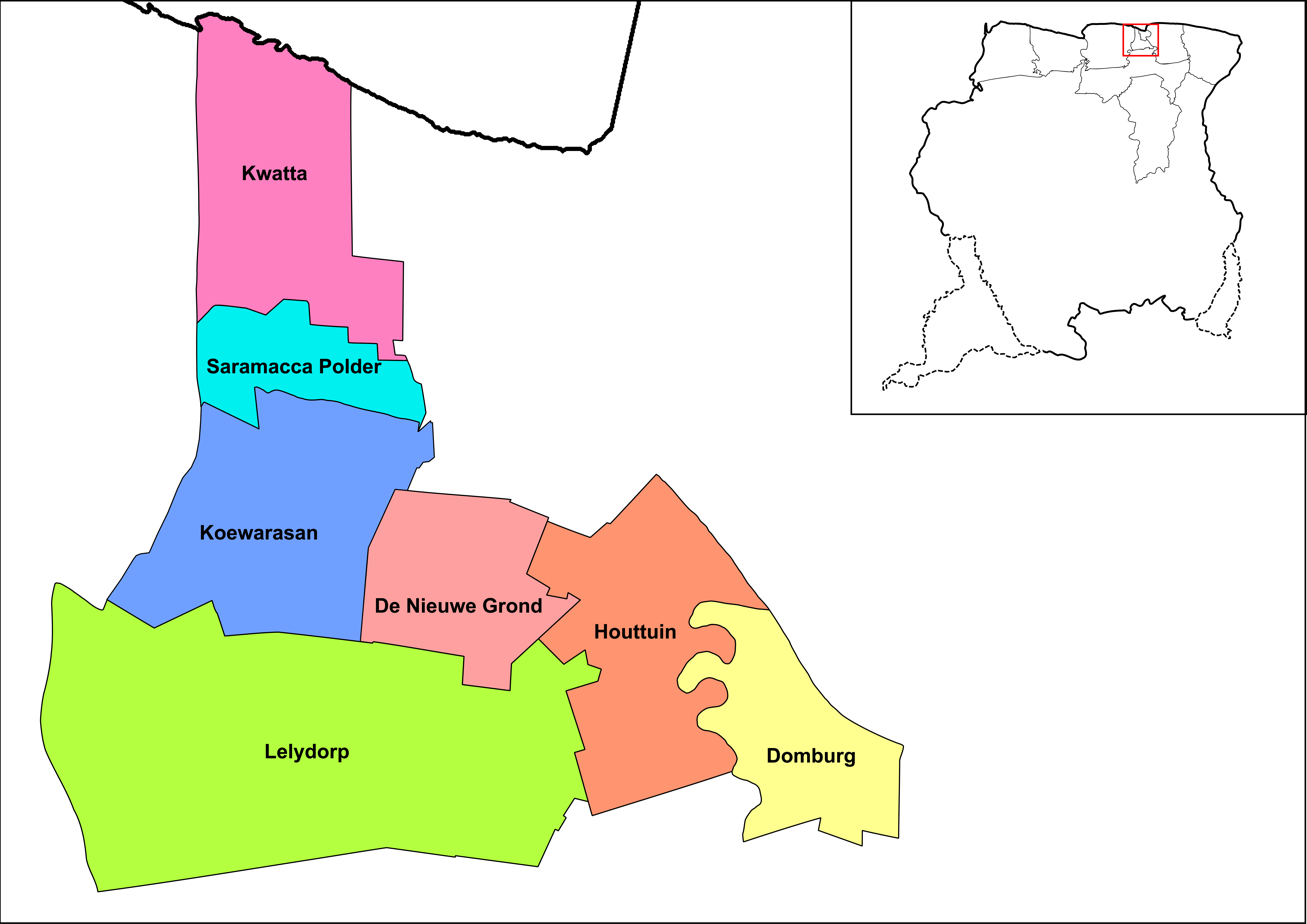
- Map showing the resorts of Wanica District. Kwatta
- Country: Suriname
- District: Wanica District

Area
  - Total: 62 km^{2} (24 sq mi)

Population (2012)
  - Total: 14,151
  - Density: 230/km^{2} (590/sq mi)
- Time zone: UTC-3 (AST)

Kwatta is a resort in Suriname, located in the Wanica District. Its population at the 2012 census was 14,151.

Kwatta is named after a former cocoa plantation located in the area. It used to be an agriculture area, but is now suburban due to its close proximity of Paramaribo. In the 1838, the Kwattaweg was built connecting Kwatta with Paramaribo.

In the early 21st century, building projects have started in Mattonshoop en Sophia's Lust. The Kwattaweg is the main road in the resort and part of the East-West Link. Kwatta is home to the Gummels Heliport.

== Notable people ==
- Shrinivási (1926-2019), poet.
