= S.V. Santos =

Surinamese football club

Santos
- Full name: Sport Vereniging Santos
- Founded: 9 September 1964; 60 years ago
- Ground: Nickerie Voetbal Stadion; Nieuw Nickerie, Suriname
- Capacity: 3,400
- League: Tweede Divisie
- 2023: Eerste Divisie, 13th of 14 relegated)
Home colours	Away colours	Third colours

Sport Vereniging Santos is an association football club from Nieuw Nickerie, Suriname. The club currently compete in the Tweede Divisie, the third highest tier of football in Suriname.

== History ==
Founded on 9 September 1964, S.V. Santos are the most successful football club from the Nickerie District in Suriname. They play in the Nickerie Voetbal Stadion to a capacity of 3,400 people, the fourth largest stadium in the country. Having spent spells in both the Hoofdklasse and Eerste Klasse, the club currently compete in the lower divisions, having won the Lidbondentoernooi in 2015. The club were also able to win the Interdistrictentoernooi in both 1979 and 1991. In 2012 the club lost both its best players Xavier Perk and Gavinne Joseph to S.V. Leo Victor while competing in the Eerste Klasse, relegating back to the lower divisions the following season. In 2015 they promoted back to the Eerste Klasse.

== Achievements ==
- Interdistrictentoernooi: 2

Winners: 1979, 1991

- Lidbondentoernooi: 1

Winners: 2015
