= ACoconut F.C. =

Surinamese football club

ACoconut
- Full name: ACoconut Football Club
- Founded: 1 May 2005; 21 years ago
- League: Eerste Divisie
- 2022–23: Tweede Divisie, 7th
Home colours

ACoconut Football Club is a football club located in Brokopondo, Suriname. The club currently competes in the Eerste Divisie, the second tier of Surinamese football.

== Achievements ==
- Lidbondentoernooi: 1

Winners: 2011
