= SVB Tweede Divisie =

- Founded: 1923
- First season: 1923–24
- Country: Suriname
- Confederation: CONCACAF
- Number of clubs: 12
- Level on pyramid: 2 (1923–2024); 3 (2024–)
- Promotion to: Eerste Divisie
- Relegation to: Derde Divisie
- Domestic cup(s): Beker van Suriname; Suriname President's Cup
- Current champions: Sunny Point (2022-23)
- Current: 2022–23 SVB Tweede Divisie

The SVB Tweede Divisie is third-highest division overall in the Surinamese football league system after the SVB Eerste Divisie, where the top club is promoted to each season. The weakest club is relegated to the Derde Divisie. The league was previously known as the SVB Eerste Klasse but became the Eerste Divisie for the 2016–17 season after Suriname's top division changed its name from Hoofdklasse to Topklasse, only to be rebranded as the Tweede Divisie for the 2017–18 season.

The competition was founded in 1923.

== Clubs ==
The following clubs participated in the 2022–23 season:

- Sea Boys
- Happy Boys
- Real Moengotapoe
- Botopasi
- Kamal Dewaker
- Juniors 2014
- ACoconut
- Tahitie
- Sophia
- Sunny Point

The following clubs have participated in the league:

- Boma Star
- De Ster
- FCS Nacional
- Fortuna 1975
- Inter Rica
- Jai Hanuman
- Notch
- Randjiet Boys
- Real Saramacca
- SNL
- Takdier Boys
- Tammenga

== Champions ==
Season	Champion
1923–24	Transvaal
1925	Go-Ahead
1926–27	Go-Ahead
1928	Ajax II
1929	not played
1930–31	Cicerone
1932–1935	not played
1936–37	Jong Ajax II
1937–1945	not played
1946	Robinhood
1947–1950	not played
1950–51	Xerxes
1952	Voorwaarts II
1953	PVV
1954–55	no champion
1956	Coronie Boys
1957–58	Coronie Boys
1958	Coronie Boys
1959	not played
1960–61	no champion
1961	Uruguay
1962	SNL
1963–64	unknown
1964	Orkaan
1965	unknown
1966	NAKS; Sonny Boys FC
1967	Paramount
1968	Funmakers
1969	PVV
1970	Tuna; Jai Hind
1971	Funmakers
1972	not played
1973–74	Shanti Del
1974–75	Santos
1975–76	Indramaju
1976	Coronie Boys
1977–78	Fortuna Lelydorp
1978–79	Takdier Boys
1979	Paloeloe
1980	Paraguay Paramaribo
1981	Boxel
1982	Producers
1983	Boxel
1984	Paloeloe
1985	Real Moengotapoe
1986	Leo Victor
1987	Jai Hind
1988	Voorwaarts
1989	not played
1990–91	Remo
1991–92	Boxel
1992–93	PVV
1993–94	Prekash
1994–95	Voorwaarts
1995–96	Jai Hind 92
1997	DEGO
1998–99	not played
1999–00	Jai Hind Nickerie
2000–01	not played
2001–02	Kamal Dewaker
2002–03	Young Rhythm
2003–04	Randjiet Boys
2004–05	HOB
2005–06	DEGO
2006–07	Randjiet Boys
2007–08	Takdier Boys
2008–09	Jai Hanuman
2009–10	Kamal Dewaker
2010–11	Notch
2011–12	SNL
2012–13	Takdier Boys
2013–14	Bomastar
2014–15	Nishan 42
2015–16	Deva Boys
2016–17	West United
2017–18	ACoconut
2018–19	Happy Boys
2019–20	season abandoned
2020–21	not played
2022	PVV B
2022–23	Sunny Point
