= Livorno, Suriname =

Coordinates: 5°47′N 55°11′W

Livorno Ofriti (Sranan Tongo) Lafendro (Caribbean Hindustani) Lepondro (Caribbean Javanese)
- Resort
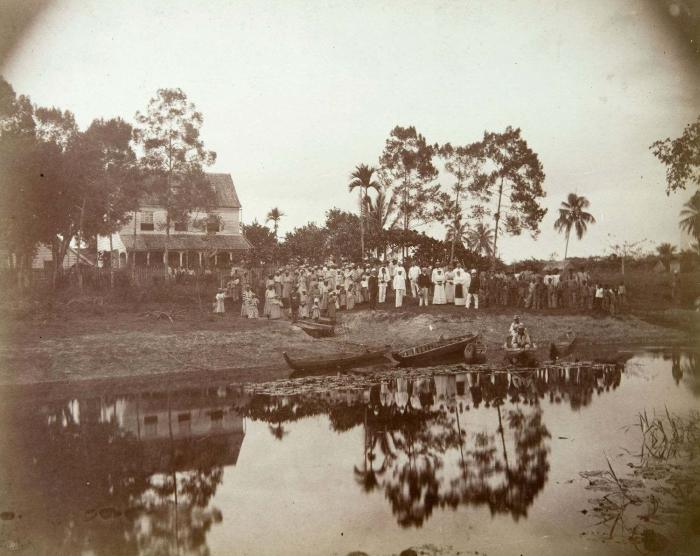
- Plantation Prosperité (~1893)

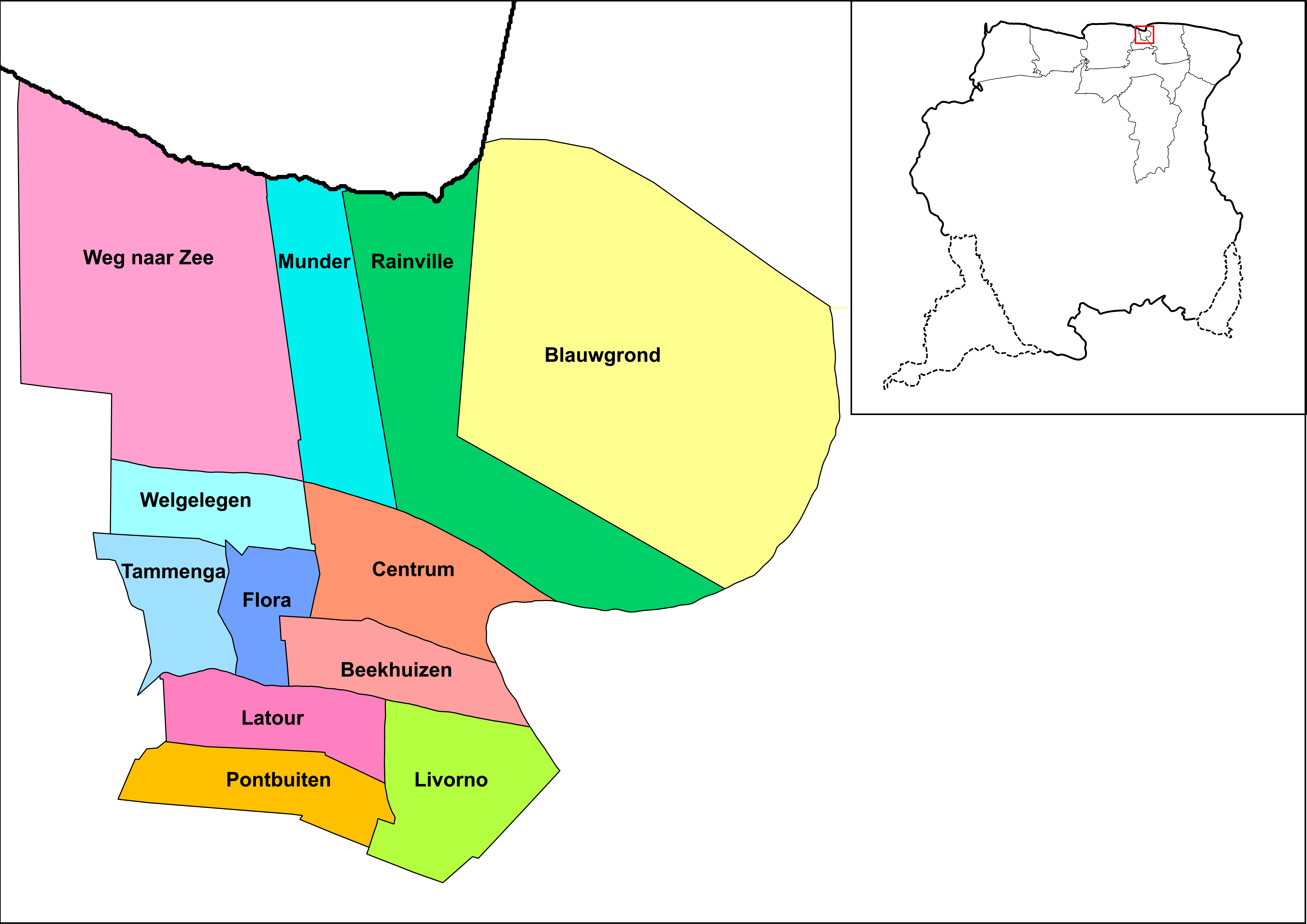
- Map showing the resorts of Paramaribo District. Liverno
- Country: Suriname
- District: Paramaribo District

Area
  - Total: 9 km^{2} (3.5 sq mi)

Population (2012)
  - Total: 8,209
  - Density: 910/km^{2} (2,400/sq mi)
- Time zone: UTC-3 (AST)

Livorno (Note: Sranan Tongo: Ofriti, Caribbean Hindustani: Lafendro, Caribbean Javanese: Lepondro) is a resort in Suriname, located in the Paramaribo District. Its population at the 2012 census was 8,209.

The resort consists of the neighbourhoods Livorno and Bethesda. Livorno is a former sugar plantation founded in 1819 by F. Cassali from Livorno, Italy. Bethesda was the location of a leper colony which had been at that location between 1933, and 1962. Livorno is close to the harbour, and home to small industry.
