= 2024 Inter Moengotapoe season =

Inter Moengotapoe
2024 season
- Chairman: Ronnie Brunswijk
- Manager: Josef Joekoe
- Stadium: Ronnie Brunswijkstadion
- Major League: 4th
- SVB Cup: Final

The 2024 season is the 32nd season in the existence of the Inter Moengotapoe and the club's 30th consecutive season in the top flight of Surinamese football, following promotion in 1994. They also are competing in the SVB Cup.

== Squad ==
As of 26 July 2024

Note: Flags indicate national team as defined under FIFA eligibility rules; some limited exceptions apply. Players may hold more than one non-FIFA nationality.

No.	Pos.	Nation	Player
1	GK	SUR	Cherwin Doorson
2	DF	SUR	Anduelo Amoeferie
5	DF	SUR	Miquel Darson
6	DF	SUR	Giovanni Asabigie
7	FW	SUR	Donnegy Fer
8	DF	SUR	Ronaldo Kemble
9	DF	SUR	Giovanni Waal
10	FW	SUR	Damian Brunswijk
11	FW	SUR	Kareem Kwasie
12	MF	SUR	Jerrel Wijks

No.	Pos.	Nation	Player
14	MF	SUR	Sersinho Eduard
16	FW	SUR	Rievaldo Doorson
23	FW	SUR	Gilberto Cronie
24	MF	SUR	Romeo Kastiel
30	GK	SUR	Obrendo Huiswoud
60	DF	SUR	Urano Morris
61	MF	SUR	Ronnie Brunswijk (captain)
69	DF	SUR	Joel Baja
77	FW	SUR	Vitorino Pinas
99	DF	SUR	Naldo Kwasie

== Competitions ==
=== Suriname Major League ===
==== League table ====
Pos	Team	Pld	W	D	L	GF	GA	GD	Pts	Qualification or relegation
2	Transvaal (Note: Transvaal was deducted 3 points.)	18	12	4	2	45	10	+35	37	Qualification for the Championship round
3	Voorwaarts	18	10	6	2	23	9	+14	36	Qualification for the Championship round
4	Inter Moengotapoe	18	10	4	4	44	25	+19	34	Qualification for the Championship round
5	Notch	18	9	7	2	34	15	+19	34	
6	PVV	18	8	2	8	28	25	+3	26	

Updated to match(es) played on unknown. Source:
Rules for classification: 1) Points; 2) Head-to-head points; 3) Head-to-head goal difference; 4) Head-to-head goals scored; 5) Goal difference; 6) Goals scored; 7) Draw.

==== Results by round ====
Round	1	2	3	4	5	6	7	8	9	10	11	12	13	14	15	16	17	18
Ground	H	A	A	H	H	A	H	A	H	A	A	H	H	A	H	A	A	H
Result	W	L	D	W	D	W	L	W	W	W	D	W	D	L	L	W	W	
Position	4	6	6	6	6	5	6	4	4	4	4	4	4	4	4	5	5	5

A = Away; H = Home; W = Win; D = Draw; L = Loss
