= 2023 SVB Eerste Divisie =

SVB Eerste Divisie
- Season: 2023
- Dates: 13 January – 30 July 2023
- Champions: Robinhood
- Relegated: Bintang Lahir; Santos
- Caribbean Cup: Robinhood; Inter Moengotapoe
- Matches played: 156
- Goals scored: 600 (3.85 per match)
- Top goalscorer: Shaquille Cairo (29 goals)

The 2023 SVB Eerste Divisie was the 89th season of the SVB Eerste Divisie, the top division football competition in Suriname. The season had a delayed beginning, and began on 13 January 2023. It is scheduled to conclude on 30 July 2023. At the end of the season the new Suriname Major League was formed as the country's new top division.

Robinhood won the league championship, successfully defending their title. It was Robinhood's first consecutive league championship since 1995, and their 26th overall Surinamese league title.

== Teams ==
Flora and Slee Juniors were promoted to the Eerste Divisie from the SVB Tweede Divisie. No Eerste Divisie clubs were relegated from the 2022 season, although during the 2023 campaign, Bintang Lahir withdrew from the league.

=== Stadiums and locations ===
Location of teams of the 2022–23 SVB Eerste Divisie.

Club	Location	Venue	Capacity	2022 position
Bintang Lahir	Groningen	Eliazer Stadion	1,000	12th
Broki	Paramaribo	Zichem Sportcentrum	3,000	9th
Flora	Paramaribo	Frank Essed Stadion	3,500	TD 1st
Inter Moengotapoe	Moengo	Ronnie Brunswijkstadion	5,000	2nd
Inter Wanica	Meerzorg	Meerzorg Stadion	1,300	6th
Leo Victor	Paramaribo	Frank Essed Stadion	3,500	3rd
Notch	Moengo	Ronnie Brunswijkstadion	5,000	4th
PVV	Paramaribo	Zichem Sportcentrum	3,000	7th
Robinhood	Paramaribo	Frank Essed Stadion	3,500	1st
Santos	Nieuw Nickerie	Asraf Peerkhan Stadion	3,400	10th
Slee Juniors	Paramaribo	Kamperveen Stadion	6,000	TD 2nd
SNL	Paramaribo	Frank Essed Stadion	3,500	11th
Transvaal	Paramaribo	Frank Essed Stadion	3,500	8th
Voorwaarts	Tammenga	Voorwaartsveld	1,500	5th

=== Personnel and kits ===
Note: Flags indicate national team as has been defined under FIFA eligibility rules. Players and managers may hold more than one non-FIFA nationality.

Team	President	Manager	Captain	Kit manufacturer	Main shirt sponsor (chest)
Bintang Lahir					
Broki					
Flora					
Inter Moengotapoe	(Suriname) Ronnie Brunswijk	(Suriname) Josef Joekoe	(Suriname) Giovanni Waal	Jako	None
Inter Wanica					
Leo Victor		(Suriname) Rogillio Kolf	(Suriname) Albert Nibte	Jako	None
Notch				Macron	None
PVV					
Robinhood				Givova	Suribet
Santos				Nike	Sanhai
Slee Juniors					
SNL	(Suriname) Chan Santhokhi	(Suriname) Rigoberto Samuel	(Suriname) Rivaldo Benjamin	Joma	Suriname National Army
Transvaal	(Suriname) Rudisa Holdings	(Suriname) Kenneth Jaliens	(Suriname) Serencio Juliaans	Givova	Rudisa
Voorwaarts				Nike	Integra Marine Services

== Table ==
Pos	Team	Pld	W	D	L	GF	GA	GD	Pts	Qualification or relegation
1	Robinhood (C)	24	20	2	2	94	20	+74	62	Qualification for the Major League
2	Inter Moengotapoe	24	15	2	7	66	32	+34	47	Qualification for the Major League
3	PVV	24	13	4	7	42	25	+17	43	Qualification for the Major League
4	Notch	24	12	7	5	44	33	+11	43	Qualification for the Major League
5	Leo Victor	24	12	5	7	65	43	+22	41	Qualification for the Major League
6	Transvaal	24	12	5	7	53	37	+16	41	Qualification for the Major League
7	Voorwaarts	24	10	6	8	31	29	+2	36	Qualification for the Major League
8	Broki	24	9	3	12	38	52	−14	30	Qualification for the Major League
9	SNL (Note: Slee Juniors and SNL were administratively relegated to the 2024 Eerste Divisie due to the new formation of the Suriname Major League.) (R)	24	7	5	12	35	51	−16	26	Relegation to the Eerste Divisie
10	Flora	24	6	6	12	36	57	−21	24	Qualification for the Major League
11	Slee Juniors (R)	24	6	5	13	46	51	−5	23	Relegation to the Eerste Divisie
12	Inter Wanica	24	5	3	16	30	66	−36	18	Qualification for the Major League
13	Santos (R)	24	1	3	20	20	104	−84	6	Relegation to the Eerste Divisie
14	Bintang Lahir (Note: Bintang Lahir withdrew from the league before the start of the season.) (R)	0	—	—	—	—	—	—	0	Withdrew and relegated; all results annulled

Updated to match(es) played on 16 July 2024. Source: RSSSF
(C) Champions; (R) Relegated
