= 2017–18 SVB Eerste Divisie =

Eerste Divisie
- Season: 2017–18
- Champions: Robinhood
- Caribbean Club Shield: Robinhood
- Top goalscorer: (Suriname) Ivanildo Rozenblad (22 goals)

The 2017–18 Telesur Eerste Divisie is the 85th season of top tier Suriname football league and 1st season branded as the Eerste Divisie, the highest football league competition of Suriname. The season began on 20 October 2017 and ended on 24 June 2018.

== Teams ==
A total of 13 clubs took part in the league. Joining the league was West United and Papatam who played the previous season in the second-tier SVB Eerste Klasse. Jong Rambaan were relegated from the Topklasse to the Eerste Klasse.

=== Stadiums and locations ===
Club	Location	Venue	Capacity
Botopasi	Botopasi	Mgr. Aloysius Zichem Sportcentrum (Paramaribo)	3,000
Inter Moengotapoe	Moengo	Ronnie Brunswijkstadion	5,000
Leo Victor	Paramaribo	Dr. Ir. Franklin Essed Stadion	3,500
Nishan 42	Meerzorg	Meerzorg Stadion	1,300
Notch	Moengo	Moengo Stadion	1,300
Papatam			
PVV	Paramaribo	Dr. Ir. Franklin Essed Stadion	3,500
Robinhood	Paramaribo	Dr. Ir. Franklin Essed Stadion	3,500
SNL	Paramaribo	Dr. Ir. Franklin Essed Stadion	3,500
Transvaal	Paramaribo	Andre Kamperveen Stadion	7,100
Voorwaarts	Paramaribo	Voorwaartsveld	1,500
WBC	Paramaribo	Andre Kamperveen Stadion	7,100
West United			

== Standings ==
Final table.

Pos	Team	Pld	W	D	L	GF	GA	GD	Pts	Qualification or relegation
1	SV Robinhood	24	17	6	1	74	27	+47	57	Champions
2	SV Notch	24	17	4	3	52	22	+30	55	
3	SV Transvaal	24	16	4	4	52	25	+27	52	
4	Inter Moengotapoe	24	13	4	7	55	24	+31	43	
5	SV Walking Boyz Company	24	13	3	8	53	43	+10	42	
6	SV Leo Victor	24	11	6	7	38	24	+14	39	
7	P.V.V.	24	10	5	9	47	50	−3	35	
8	SV Botopasi	24	9	4	11	41	55	−14	31	
9	SV Voorwaarts	24	8	4	12	35	43	−8	28	
10	F.C. West United	24	8	0	16	34	51	−17	24	
11	S.V. Papatam	24	5	1	18	27	73	−46	16	3 points deducted
12	Sportvereniging Nationaal Leger	24	3	2	19	21	57	−36	11	
13	SV Nishan 42	24	3	3	18	30	65	−35	12	3 points deducted

Updated to match(es) played on unknown. Source:

== Related competitions ==
- 2017–18 SVB Eerste Klasse
- 2017–18 SVB Tweede Klasse
- 2017–18 SVB Cup
- 2017–18 SVB President's Cup
