= 2024 Suriname Major League =

Suriname Major League
- Season: 2024
- Dates: 23 February 2024 – 25 August 2024
- Champions: Robinhood; 1st SML title 27th Surinamese title
- Caribbean Cup: Robinhood
- CFU Club Shield: Transvaal
- Matches: 85
- Goals: 286 (3.36 per match)
- Biggest home win: Robinhood 7–1 Inter Wanica (15 June 2024); Transvaal 6–0 Inter Wanica (23 June 2024)
- Biggest away win: Broki 0–6 PVV (30 March 2024); Broki 0–6 Transvaal (20 May 2024)

The 2024 season was the first season of the Suriname Major League, introducing professional football in Suriname and the 90th season of top-flight Surinamese football overall. The season began on 23 February 2024. It is scheduled to conclude on 25 August.

The league's first goal was scored by Jamilhio Rigters of S.V. Robinhood, in the opening match on 23 February 2024 against S.V. Transvaal.

S.V. Robinhood won their first title of the Suriname Major League, going unbeaten.

== Teams ==
Bintang Lahir withdrew from the league and Santos were relegated to the 2023–24 SVB Tweede Divisie. No team from the Tweede Divisie was promoted and the league was reduced from 14 teams to 10 teams.

=== Stadiums and locations ===
Team	Location	Venue	Capacity	2023 position
Broki	Paramaribo	Zichem Sportcentrum	3,000	8th
Flora	Paramaribo	Dr. Ir. Franklin Essed Stadion	3,500	9th
Inter Moengotapoe	Moengo	Ronnie Brunswijkstadion	5,000	2nd
Inter Wanica	Meerzorg	Meerzorg Stadion	1,300	12th
Leo Victor	Paramaribo	Dr. Ir. Franklin Essed Stadion	3,500	5th
Notch	Moengo	Ronnie Brunswijkstadion	5,000	4th
PVV	Paramaribo	Zichem Sportcentrum	3,000	6th
Robinhood	Paramaribo	Dr. Ir. Franklin Essed Stadion	3,500	1st
Transvaal	Paramaribo	Dr. Ir. Franklin Essed Stadion	3,500	3rd
Voorwaarts	Paramaribo	Voorwaartsveld	1,500	7th

== Regular season ==
=== League table ===
Pos	Team	Pld	W	D	L	GF	GA	GD	Pts	Qualification or relegation
1	Robinhood (C)	18	11	7	0	50	17	+33	40	Qualification for the Championship round
2	Transvaal (Note: Transvaal was deducted 3 points.)	18	12	4	2	45	10	+35	37	Qualification for the Championship round
3	Voorwaarts	18	10	6	2	23	9	+14	36	Qualification for the Championship round
4	Inter Moengotapoe	18	10	4	4	44	25	+19	34	Qualification for the Championship round
5	Notch	18	9	7	2	34	15	+19	34	
6	PVV	18	8	2	8	28	25	+3	26	
7	Flora	18	5	1	12	20	45	−25	16	
8	Broki	18	3	1	14	23	54	−31	10	
9	Inter Wanica	18	2	3	13	19	52	−33	9	
10	Leo Victor	18	2	1	15	13	47	−34	7	

Updated to match(es) played on unknown. Source:
Rules for classification: 1) Points; 2) Head-to-head points; 3) Head-to-head goal difference; 4) Head-to-head goals scored; 5) Goal difference; 6) Goals scored; 7) Draw.
(C) Champions

=== Results ===
Home \ Away	BRK	FLO	IMT	LEO	NCH	PVV	RBH	TRV	VOR	WAN
Broki	—	0–2	1–4	3–4	0–0	0–6	0–5	0–6	1–2	3–1
Flora	4–3	—	0–5	1–0	0–2	2–1	1–4	0–3	1–1	3–0
Inter Moengotapoe	3–1	5–0	—	3–2	2–1	3–1	2–2	0–3	0–1	2–2
Leo Victor	4–3	0–1	2–3	—	0–4	0–3	1–5	0–1	0–3	0–2
Notch	1–0	2–0	1–2	0–0	—	0–0	1–1	2–2	1–0	5–0
PVV	6–0	4–2	1–3	3–0	0–0	—	0–4	1–2	0–1	4–1
Robinhood	5–0	4–1	2–2	5–1	1–1	4–0	—	1–1	1–1	4–1
Transvaal	3–0	5–0	3–0	1–0	2–2	2–1	2–2	—	1–0	3–0
Voorwaarts	2–1	5–0	0–0	3–0	0–1	1–0	1–1	0–1	—	1–1
Inter Wanica	1–3	0–3	2–2	2–0	0–5	1–4	1–4	0–3	1–1	—

Updated to match(es) played on unknown. Source: https://sml.sr/
Legend: Blue = home team win; Yellow = draw; Red = away team win.

== Championship round ==
=== Bracket ===
Semifinals
1	Transvaal	1	2
4	Inter Moengotapoe	0	0
3	Voorwaarts	0	0
2	Robinhood	2	2

Finals
Transvaal	0
Robinhood	2

=== Semi-finals ===
11 August 2024
19:00

Transvaal	1–0	Inter Moengotapoe
Grendel 19'

Frank Essed Stadion, Paramaribo
19 August 2024
21:00

Inter Moengotapoe	0–2	Transvaal
		Hecbert 55'; Tooy 89'; Rellum (red card)

Frank Essed Stadion, Paramaribo

12 August 2024
19:00

Robinhood	2–0	Voorwaarts
Andro 78'; Tuur 86'

Frank Essed Stadion, Paramaribo
18 August 2024
18:00

Voorwaarts	0–2	Robinhood
		Zijler 43'; Rosebel 67'

Frank Essed Stadion, Paramaribo

=== Final ===
24 August 2024
19:00

Transvaal	0–2	Robinhood
Dap (red card)		Rigters 30'; Zijler 85'

Frank Essed Stadion, Paramaribo
Attendance: 3,150

== Statistics ==
=== Top scorers ===
As of 23 July 2024

Rank	Player	Club	Goals
1	(Suriname) Romeo Kastiel	Inter Moengotapoe	22
2	(Suriname) Dimitrie Apai	Transvaal	17
3	(Suriname) Finidi Misidjan	Notch	12
4	(Suriname) Lalanie Tooy	Transvaal	10
5	(Suriname) Jamilhio Rigters	Robinhood	9
5	(Suriname) Quilliano Stedenburg	Robinhood	9
5	(Suriname) Shquille Petrusi	Flora	9
6	(Suriname) Garvey Kwelling	PVV	8
