= 2022 SVB Eerste Divisie =

SVB Eerste Divisie
- Season: 2022
- Champions: SV Robinhood
- Matches played: 132
- Goals scored: 550 (4.17 per match)
- Top goalscorer: Garvey Kwelling; Finidi Masidjan (20 goals each)

The 2022 SVB Eerste Divisie is the 88th season of the SVB Eerste Divisie, the top division football competition in Suriname. The season began on 25 February 2022.

Inter Moengotapoe, having won the title in 2018–19, were the title holders, since the 2019–20 edition was cancelled due to the COVID-19 pandemic in Suriname and the title was not awarded.

== League table ==
Pos	Team	Pld	W	D	L	GF	GA	GD	Pts	Qualification or relegation
1	Robinhood	22	18	2	2	78	19	+59	56	Champions
2	Inter Moengotapoe	22	17	2	3	78	27	+51	53	
3	Leo Victor	22	12	4	6	50	27	+23	40	
4	Notch	22	12	3	7	45	32	+13	39	
5	Voorwaarts	22	11	3	8	54	31	+23	36	
6	Inter Wanica	22	10	3	9	47	54	−7	33	
7	PVV	22	10	1	11	45	31	+14	31	
8	Transvaal	22	9	3	10	35	38	−3	30	
9	Broki	22	9	3	10	41	49	−8	30	
10	Santos	22	4	1	17	29	73	−44	13	
11	SNL	22	4	0	18	22	74	−52	12	
12	Bintang Lair	22	3	1	18	26	95	−69	10	

Updated to match(es) played on unknown. Source:

== Top scorers ==
Rank	Scorer	Team	Goals
1	Garvey Kwelling	PVV	20
1	Finidi Masidjan	SV Notch	20
2	Miroy Koeba	Inter Wanica	9
2	Jetro Rees	SV Leo Victor	9
2	Jamilhio Rigters	SV Robinhood	9
6	Rievaldo Doorson	Inter Moengotapoe	8
6	Romeo Kastiel	Inter Moengotapoe	8
8	Joel Baja	Inter Moengotapoe	7
9	Derice Linger	SV Transvaal	6
9	Rutgers Neiden	SV Leo Victor	6
