= 2025 Suriname Major League =

Suriname Major League
- Season: 2025
- Dates: 31 January 2025 – 12 July 2025
- Champions: Inter Moengotapoe
- Relegated: None
- Matches: 18
- Goals: 15 (0.83 per match)
- Biggest home win: Robinhood 9–1 Broki (31 April 2025) Stadium:Dr. Ir. Franklin Essed Stadion

The 2025 Suriname Major League is the second season of the Suriname Major League, introducing professional football in Suriname and the 91st season of top-flight Surinamese football overall. The season began on 30 January 2025. It is scheduled to conclude on 12 July 2025.

S.V. Robinhood is the Defending Champions of the 2024 Suriname Major League.

== Teams ==
No Teams relegated to the 2025 SVB Eerste Divisie and No team from the Eerste Divisie was promoted and the league was remain to 10 teams.

=== Stadiums and locations ===
Team	Location	Venue	Capacity	2023 position
Broki	Paramaribo	Zichem Sportcentrum	3,000	8th
Flora	Paramaribo	Dr. Ir. Franklin Essed Stadion	3,500	9th
Inter Moengotapoe	Moengo	Ronnie Brunswijkstadion	5,000	2nd
Inter Wanica	Meerzorg	Meerzorg Stadion	1,300	12th
Leo Victor	Paramaribo	Dr. Ir. Franklin Essed Stadion	3,500	5th
Notch	Moengo	Ronnie Brunswijkstadion	5,000	4th
PVV	Paramaribo	Zichem Sportcentrum	3,000	6th
Robinhood	Paramaribo	Dr. Ir. Franklin Essed Stadion	3,500	1st
Transvaal	Paramaribo	Dr. Ir. Franklin Essed Stadion	3,500	3rd
Voorwaarts	Paramaribo	Voorwaartsveld	1,500	7th

== Regular season ==
=== League table ===
Pos	Team	Pld	W	D	L	GF	GA	GD	Pts	Qualification or relegation
1	Robinhood	18	12	6	0	49	16	+33	42	Qualification for the Championship round
2	Transvaal	18	11	4	3	26	10	+16	37	Qualification for the Championship round
3	Voorwaarts	18	11	1	6	32	20	+12	34	Qualification for the Championship round
4	Notch	18	9	5	4	29	25	+4	32	Qualification for the Championship round
5	PVV	18	9	4	5	36	17	+19	31	Qualification for the Championship round
6	Inter Moengotapoe (C)	18	8	6	4	36	26	+10	30	Qualification for the Championship round
7	Inter Wanica	18	4	4	10	10	39	−29	16	
8	Leo Victor	18	3	4	11	17	27	−10	13	
9	Flora	18	3	2	13	23	45	−22	11	
10	Broki	18	2	0	16	17	55	−38	6	

Source: soccerway
(C) Champions

== Championship Playoff ==
=== Bracket ===
Quarterfinals
Notch	1	1	2
PVV	4	1	5
Voorwaarts	0	0	0
Inter Moengotapoe	3	2	5

Semifinals
PVV	1	0	3
Robinhood	1	0	2
Inter Moengotapoe	2	0	5
Transvaal	1	1	4

Finals
PVV	1	–	1
Inter Moengotapoe	2	–	2

=== Preliminary Round ===
29 June 2025	Notch	1–4	PVV
	(?)		(?); (?); (?); (?)

2 July 2025	PVV	1–1	Notch
	(?)		(?)

PVV won 5–2 on aggregate.

29 June 2025	Voorwaarts	0–3	Inter Moengotapoe
			(?); (?); (?)

3 July 2025	Inter Moengotapoe	2–0	Voorwaarts
	(?); (?)

Inter Moengotapoe won 5–0 on aggregate.

=== Semifinals ===
6 July 2025	Robinhood	1–1	PVV
	(?)		(?)

9 July 2025	PVV	0–0	Robinhood

1–1 on aggregate; PVV won 3–2 on penalties.

6 July 2025	Transvaal	1–2	Inter Moengotapoe
	(?)		(?); (?)

9 July 2025	Inter Moengotapoe	0–1	Transvaal
			(?)

2–2 on aggregate; Inter Moengotapoe won 5–4 on penalties.

=== Third Place Match ===
12 July 2025	Robinhood	4–0	Transvaal
	(?); (?); (?); (?)

=== Final ===
12 July 2025	PVV	1–2	Inter Moengotapoe
	(?)		(?); (?)

== Attendances ==
The average league attendance was 240:

#	Club	Average
1	Robinhood	467
2	Transvaal	431
3	Inter Moengotapoe	291
4	Voorwaarts	278
5	PVV	223
6	Notch	183
7	Broki	168
8	Leo Victor	132
9	Inter Wanica	117
10	Flora	110
