= 2024 S.V. Robinhood season =

Sport Vereniging Robinhood
2024 season
- Chairman: Emilho Hoek
- Manager: Roberto Gödeken
- Stadium: Frank Essed Stadion
- Major League: 1st (champions)
- SVB Cup: Final

The 2024 season is the 79th season in the existence of the Sport Vereniging Robinhood and the club's 9th consecutive season in the top flight of Surinamese football, following promotion in 2015. They also are competing in the SVB Cup.

== Squad ==
As of 12 July 2024

Note: Flags indicate national team as defined under FIFA eligibility rules; some limited exceptions apply. Players may hold more than one non-FIFA nationality.

No.	Pos.	Nation	Player
1	GK	BRA	Dion Almeida
2	DF	SUR	Alierio Belfor
3	DF	SUR	Guillermo Welles
4	DF	SUR	Byorn Sandvliet
5	DF	SUR	Furgell Sedoc
6	MF	SUR	Franklin Singodikromo
7	FW	SUR	Dimitrio Andro
8	DF	SUR	Marinos Schet
9	FW	BRA	Leandro Rodrigues
10	FW	SUR	Jamilhio Rigters
12	DF	SUR	Raviek Pryor
13	DF	SUR	Dustino Pere
14	MF	SUR	Roche Rosebel
15	MF	SUR	Renske Adipi
16	DF	SUR	Roshiano Soeberman

No.	Pos.	Nation	Player
17	FW	SUR	Donogy Kago
18	DF	SUR	Ackenie Muesa
19	DF	SUR	Cyrano Beeldstroo
20	FW	SUR	Darrel Sijpenhof
21	MF	SUR	Murgillio Esejas
22	GK	SUR	Jonathan Fonkel
23	MF	BRA	Carlos da Silva
24	MF	SUR	Oiliano Ligeon
25	DF	BRA	Juari Correa
26	FW	SUR	Quiliano Stedenburg
27	FW	SUR	Don Tuur
28	FW	SUR	Shaquille Cairo
29	MF	SUR	Joel Matabadat
30	DF	SUR	Ichael Dalfour
35	GK	SUR	Rosano Saling

== Competitions ==
=== Suriname Major League ===
==== League table ====
Pos	Team	Pld	W	D	L	GF	GA	GD	Pts	Qualification or relegation
1	Robinhood (C)	18	11	7	0	50	17	+33	40	Qualification for the Championship round
2	Transvaal (Note: Transvaal was deducted 3 points.)	18	12	4	2	45	10	+35	37	Qualification for the Championship round
3	Voorwaarts	18	10	6	2	23	9	+14	36	Qualification for the Championship round
4	Inter Moengotapoe	18	10	4	4	44	25	+19	34	Qualification for the Championship round

Updated to match(es) played on unknown. Source:
Rules for classification: 1) Points; 2) Head-to-head points; 3) Head-to-head goal difference; 4) Head-to-head goals scored; 5) Goal difference; 6) Goals scored; 7) Draw.
(C) Champions

==== Results by round ====
Round	1	2	3	4	5	6	7	8	9	10	11	12	13	14	15	16	17	18
Ground	H	A	A	H	A	H	A	H	H	A	H	H	A	H	H	H	H	A
Result	D	W	W	D	D	W	W	W	D	D	W	D	W	W	D	W	W	W
Position	5	4	5	4	5	4	3	2	2	3	3	2	2	2	3	2	2	1

A = Away; H = Home; W = Win; D = Draw; L = Loss
