= 2024 SVB Cup =

Beker van Suriname
SVB Bekercompetitie

Tournament details
- Country: Suriname
- Dates: 9 February 2024 – 31 August 2024
- Teams: 16

Final positions
- Champions: Robinhood
- Runners-up: Inter Moengotapoe
- Semifinalists: Notch; PVV

The 2024 SVB Cup is the 30th season of the Surinamese Cup. The competition began on 9 February and will end on 27 July.

Inter Moengotapoe are the defending champions.

== Round dates ==
Round	Clubs remaining	Clubs involved	Dates played
Round of 16	16	16	9 February – 17 February
Quarter-finals	8	8	23 March & 24 March
Semi-finals	4	4	29 May & 17 July
Final	2	2	27 July

== Round of 16 ==
Team 1	Score	Team 2
Inter Moengotapoe (I)	5−2	Junior 2014 (II)
De Ster (III)	4−5	ACoconut (II)
Robinhood (I)	5−0	Real Moengotapoe (II)
Flora (I)	3−2	TOK (II)
PVV (I)	2−1	Voorwaarts (I)
Leo Victor (I)	0−1	Inter Wanica (I)
Transvaal (I)	9−0	Jong Rica (III)
Notch (I)	4−2	Broki (I)

9 February 2024	Inter Moengotapoe	5−2	Junior 2014
20:00		Report

Inter Moengotapoe advanced to the quarter finals.

10 February 2024	De Ster	4−5	ACoconut
17:30		Report

ACoconut advanced to the quarter finals.

10 February 2024	Robinhood	5−0	Real Moengotapoe
20:00		Report

Robinhood advanced to the quarter finals.

11 February 2024	Flora	3−2	TOK
17:30		Report

Flora advanced to the quarter finals.

11 February 2024	PVV	2−1	Voorwaarts
20:00		Report

PVV advanced to the quarter finals.

16 February 2024	Leo Victor	0−1	Inter Wanica
20:00		Report

Inter Wanica advanced to the quarter finals.

17 February 2024	Transvaal	9−0	Jong Rica
17:30		Report

Transvaal advanced to the quarter finals.

17 February 2024	Notch	4−2	Broki
20:00		Report

Notch advanced to the quarter finals.

== Quarter finals ==
Team 1	Score	Team 2
Flora (I)	0−7	Notch (I)
Robinhood (I)	8−1	ACoconut (II)
Transvaal (I)	1−3	Inter Moengotapoe (I)
Inter Wanica (I)	1−3	PVV (I)

23 March 2024	Flora	0−7	Notch
18:00		Report

Notch advanced to the semi finals.

23 March 2024	Robinhood	8−1	ACoconut
20:00		Report

Robinhood advanced to the semi finals.

24 March 2024	Transvaal	1−3	Inter Moengotapoe
20:00		Report

Inter Moengotapoe advanced to the semi finals.

24 March 2024	Inter Wanica	1−3	PVV
20:00		Report

PVV advanced to the semi finals.

== Semi finals ==
Team 1	Score	Team 2
Robinhood	4−1	Notch
Inter Moengotapoe	4−2	PVV

29 May 2024	Robinhood	4−1	Notch
20:00		Report

Robinhood advanced to the final.

17 July 2024	Inter Moengotapoe	4–2	PVV
20:00		Report

Inter Moengotapoe advanced to the final.

== Final ==
31 August 2024	Robinhood	5–0	Inter Moengotapoe
20:00	Rigters 10', 90'; Andro 35'; Esajas 82'; Zijler 85'	Report
