= 2015–16 SVB Hoofdklasse =

Hoofdklasse
- Season: 2015–16
- Champions: Inter Moengotapoe; 8th title
- Relegated: Excelsior; Takdier Boys
- CFU Club Championship: Inter Moengotapoe; Transvaal
- Matches: 161
- Goals: 305 (1.89 per match)
- Top goalscorer: (Suriname) Romeo Kastiel (18 goals)
- Best goalkeeper: Sersinio Profijt (0.88 goals/match)
- Biggest home win: Inter Moengotapoe 7-0 Botopasie 16.04-2016
- Biggest away win: Excelsior 0-7 Nishan 42 16.01-2016
- Highest scoring: 8 Goals (WBC 6-2 Botopasie 14.05-2016)

Location of the teams

The 2015–16 Surinamese Hoofdklasse was the 83rd season of the SVB Hoofdklasse, the highest football league competition of Suriname. The season began in November 2015, and finished in June 2016.

== Changes from 2014–15 ==
Bomastar and SNL was relegated to SVB Eerste Klasse. Nishan '42 and Robinhood was promoted from the SVB Eerste Klasse.

== Teams ==
=== Stadia and Locations ===
Note: Table lists in alphabetical order.

Team	Location	Stadium
Botopasi	Botopasi	Mgr. Aloysius Zichem Sportcentrum (Paramaribo)
Excelsior	Meerzorg	Meerzorg Stadion
Inter Moengotapoe	Moengo	Ronnie Brunswijkstadion
Leo Victor	Paramaribo	Dr. Ir. Franklin Essed Stadion
Nishan 42	Meerzorg	Meerzorg Stadion
Notch	Moengo	Moengo Stadion
Robinhood	Paramaribo	Dr. Ir. Franklin Essed Stadion
Takdier Boys	Livorno	Eddy Blackman Stadion
Transvaal	Paramaribo	Andre Kamperveen Stadion
WBC	Paramaribo	Dr. Ir. Franklin Essed Stadion

== League table and results ==
Pos	Team	Pld	W	D	L	GF	GA	GD	Pts	Qualification or relegation	INT	TRV	LEO	NIS	WBC	BOT	ROB	TAK	NOT	EXC
1	Inter Moengotapoe (C)	18	12	4	2	42	21	+21	40	Champions' Cup	—	2–1	1–0	1–1	4–2	7–0	2–1	2–2	0–1	1–1
2	Transvaal	18	9	5	4	33	24	+9	32	Champions' Cup	2–1	—	1–1	1–3	3–1	3–1	2–1	0–1	0–0	2–3
3	Leo Victor (Note: The match Notch - Leo Victor will not be played)	17	8	3	6	22	16	+6	27		1–2	0–0	—	5–1	2–0	0–0	3–1	2–0	1–3	0–2
4	Nishan 42	18	7	5	6	38	31	+7	26		0–4	3–3	0–1	—	1–0	2–2	1–1	1–3	3–0	2–0
5	WBC	18	8	2	8	40	37	+3	26		1–3	2–2	3–0	4–3	—	6–2	3–2	2–0	2–1	1–1
6	Botopasi	18	7	3	8	33	38	−5	24		2–3	1–2	1–2	2–1	4–2	—	2–0	3–2	2–2	4–1
7	Robinhood	18	6	3	9	27	31	−4	21		0–1	1–4	1–0	2–2	4–2	1–0	—	1–1	3–0	2–1
8	Takdier Boys (Note: Excelsior and Takdier Boys were refused a license for the Eerste Klasse.) (R)	18	5	5	8	24	30	−6	20	Lidbondentoernooi	2–2	2–3	0–2	0–2	2–1	1–2	1–3	—	2–0	2–2
9	Notch (Note: Notch deducted 3 points.)	17	6	3	8	23	30	−7	18		1–2	1–2	X	2–5	2–4	2–1	2–0	1–1	—	2–0
10	Excelsior (R)	18	3	3	12	23	47	−24	12	Lidbondentoernooi	3–4	0–2	0–2	0–7	1–4	1–4	4–3	1–2	2–3	—

Rules for classification: 1) points; 2) goal difference; 3) number of goals scored.
(C) Champions;
(R) Relegated

== Related competitions ==
- 2015–16 SVB Eerste Klasse
- 2015–16 Surinamese Cup
- 2015–16 SVB President's Cup
