= Albert Nibte =

Surinamese footballer (born 1993)

Personal information
- Full name: Albert Mervill Nibte
- Date of birth: 30 January 1993 (age 33)
- Place of birth: Paramaribo, Suriname
- Height: 1.81 m (5 ft 11 in)
- Position: Defender

Team information
- Current team: Voorwaarts

Senior career*
Years	Team	Apps	(Gls)
2010–2014	Leo Victor		
2014–2016	Inter Moengotapoe		
2016–2022	Leo Victor		
2022–	Voorwaarts		

International career
2011–2013	Suriname U20	15	(0)
2012	Suriname U23	1	(0)
2015–2022	Suriname	17	(0)
- * Club domestic league appearances and goals

Albert Mervill Nibte (born 20 May 1993) is a Surinamese professional footballer who plays as a defender for Suriname Major League club Voorwaarts.

== International career ==
Nibte's debut for Suriname came on 30 January 2015 in a 3–0 friendly victory over Bonaire. His first competitive match was a 0–0 (3–2 on penalties) loss against Guadeloupe in Caribbean Cup qualification on 23 March 2016.

In June 2021, Nibte was named to the Suriname squad for the 2021 CONCACAF Gold Cup.

== Honours ==
Leo Victor

- SVB Cup: 2013–14

Inter Moengotapoe

- SVB Eerste Divisie: 2014–15, 2015–16
