= Anduelo Amoeferie =

Surinamese footballer (born 1991)

Personal information
- Full name: Anduelo Amoeferie
- Date of birth: 24 September 1991 (age 35)
- Place of birth: Paramaribo, Suriname
- Height: 1.85 m (6 ft 1 in)
- Position: Full-back

Team information
- Current team: Inter Moengotapoe

Senior career*
Years	Team	Apps	(Gls)
2011–	Inter Moengotapoe		

International career
2015–2022	Suriname	20	(1)
- * Club domestic league appearances and goals

Anduelo Amoeferie (born 24 September 1991) is a Surinamese professional footballer who plays as a full-back for Suriname Major League club Inter Moengotapoe.

== International career ==
Amoeferie made his international debut for Suriname in a 1–0 friendly victory over Guyana on 30 April 2015.

In June 2021, Amoeferie was named to the Suriname squad for the 2021 CONCACAF Gold Cup.

== Honours ==
Inter Moengotapoe

- SVB Eerste Divisie: 2012–13, 2013–14, 2014–15, 2015–16, 2016–17, 2018–19
- SVB Cup: 2011–12, 2016–17, 2018–19, 2023
- Suriname President's Cup: 2012, 2013, 2017, 2019
- Caribbean Club Shield runner-up: 2018
