= V.V. Fearless =

Fearless
- Full name: Voetbal Vereniging Fearless
- Founded: 28 May 1925; 101 years ago
- Dissolved: Unknown
- Ground: Moengo Stadion, Moengo, Suriname
- Capacity: 1,000
- Chairman: W. Burside

Voetbal Vereniging Fearless, known as Fearless, was a Surinamese football club based in Moengo that played in the Hoofdklasse, the highest level of football in Suriname.

== History ==
Founded on 28 May 1925, Fearless was the second football club from Moengo. The first football club registered in the city of Moengo was Bauxite Star which was registered in March of the same year. However little is known about Bauxite Star today. The club members who were present at the clubs registration were H. Jurjens, W. Gersie, F. Gunther, E. Jie Sam Foek and J. Jie Sam Foek. Counting 21 official club members, the club reached its height of success in 1927.

The board of directors for Fearless was assembled as follows: J. Jie Sam Foek (chairman), F. Gunther (secretary), R. Thijm (treasurer), Anton Jie Sam Foek (commissioner), W. Gersie (commissioner). Commissioner Anton Jie Sam Foek was also a player and the team captain of the club.

The board underwent several changes in the first five years of the club, seeing W. Burside become chairman, D. Monnes the new treasurer and Tulberg appointed as commissioner.

By 1925, Fearless were able to beat teams from the capital city Paramaribo as well as beating teams from nearby Albina.

1925

1925	Fearless	1–1	Transvaal
		Report

1925	Fearless	1–0	Voorwaarts
		Report

1925	Fearless	1–1	Voorwaarts
		Report

1926

1926	Fearless	3–1	Ajax
		Report

1926	Fearless	1–1	Voorwaarts
		Report

1926	Fearless	0–1	MVV
		Report

1926	Fearless	5–1	Albina
		Report

1926	Fearless	5–1	Albina
		Report

From 1925 to 1930, Fearless played a total of 55 matches, recording a total of 26 wins, 13 draws and 16 losses. They were also district champions of the Moengo Sport Bond (MSB) in 1925, 1926, 1927 and 1928.

Notable former players of Fearless from the clubs' period at the top flight in Suriname include Jurjens, Klink, Naaldijk, Caprino en Wix. It is not known when the club ceased to exist. Fearless were also able to defeat the team Saint-Laurent-du-Maroni from French Guiana 5–1 in an International friendly match.
