= Gillermo Faerber =

Surinamese footballer (born 1992)

Personal information
- Full name: Gillermo Fabrisco Faerber
- Date of birth: 15 April 1992 (age 34)
- Place of birth: Paramaribo, Suriname
- Height: 1.79 m (5 ft 10 in)
- Position: Centre-back

Team information
- Current team: Bintang Lahir

Senior career*
Years	Team	Apps	(Gls)
2010–2011	Leo Victor		
2011–2016	Transvaal		
2016–2017	Nishan 42		
2017–2019	Transvaal		
2019–	Bintang Lahir		

International career
2010–2011	Suriname U20		
2012–2017	Suriname	8	(0)
- * Club domestic league appearances and goals

Gillermo Fabrisco Faerber (born 15 April 1992) is a Surinamese professional footballer who plays as a centre-back for SVB Eerste Divisie club Bintang Lahir. A former international, he played in the 2011 CONCACAF U-20 Championship and its qualifiers for the Suriname national team.
