= 2018–19 SVB Eerste Divisie =

SVB Eerste Divisie
- Season: 2018–19
- Champions: Inter Moengotapoe
- Top goalscorer: (Suriname) Renzo Akrosie (33 goals)

The 2018–19 SVB Eerste Divisie is the 86th season of the SVB Eerste Divisie, the top division football competition in Suriname. The season began on 1 November 2018 and concluded on 4 August 2019.

== League table ==
Pos	Team	Pld	W	D	L	GF	GA	GD	Pts	Qualification or relegation
1	Inter Moengotapoe (C)	30	24	5	1	75	28	+47	77	Caribbean Club Shield
2	Robinhood	30	23	7	0	95	22	+73	76	
3	Leo Victor	30	21	3	6	69	34	+35	66	
4	Transvaal	29	18	4	7	66	33	+33	58	
5	PVV	30	16	6	8	63	39	+24	54	
6	Walking Boyz Company	30	16	4	10	57	43	+14	52	
7	SNL	30	15	3	12	65	54	+11	48	
8	West United	30	11	2	17	39	47	−8	35	
9	Notch	30	10	4	16	39	63	−24	34	
10	Voorwaarts	30	9	5	16	47	47	0	32	
11	Broki	30	9	5	16	52	61	−9	32	
12	Santos	30	7	11	12	46	60	−14	32	
13	Nishan 42	30	7	8	15	50	76	−26	29	
14	ACoconut	30	7	2	21	51	87	−36	20 (Note: ACoconut deducted 3 points for failing to honour a fixture.)	
15	Papatam (R)	30	5	4	21	45	91	−46	19	Relegated to SVB Tweede Divisie
16	Botopasi (R)	29	3	3	23	29	102	−73	9 (Note: Botopasi deducted 3 points for failing to honour a fixture.)	Relegated to SVB Tweede Divisie

Updated to match(es) played on 7 September 2019. Source: Soccerway
(C) Champions; (R) Relegated

== Related competitions ==
- 2018–19 SVB Eerste Klasse
- 2018–19 SVB Tweede Klasse
- 2018–19 SVB Cup
- 2019 Suriname President's Cup
