= Sergino Eduard =

Surinamese international footballer

Personal information
- Full name: Sergino Rahi Eduard
- Date of birth: 4 September 1994 (age 32)
- Place of birth: Paramaribo, Suriname
- Height: 1.70 m (5 ft 7 in)
- Position: Midfielder

Team information
- Current team: Inter Moengotapoe

Senior career*
Years	Team	Apps	(Gls)
2012–2013	Transvaal		
2015–2016	Inter Moengotapoe		
2016–2017	Notch		
2017–	Inter Moengotapoe		

International career^{‡}
2013–	Suriname	23	(1)
- * Club domestic league appearances and goals ‡ National team caps and goals as of 18 November 2019

Sergino Rahi Eduard (born 4 September 1994) is a Surinamese professional footballer who plays as a midfielder for SVB Topklasse club Inter Moengotapoe and the Suriname national team.

== International career ==
Eduard's debut for Suriname came at the age of 19-years-old in a 2–0 win over Bonaire on 14 November 2013. In June 2021 Eduard was called up to the Suriname squad for the 2021 CONCACAF Gold Cup. Eduard played for his country internationally in the Caribbean Cup Qualification, International friendlies, Gold Cup, WC Qualification and CONCACAF Nations League B and Qualification.

=== International goals ===
Scores and results list Suriname's goal tally first.

No	Date	Venue	Opponent	Score	Result	Competition
1.	6 January 2017	Ato Boldon Stadium, Couva, Trinidad and Tobago	Haiti	2–4	2–4	2017 CONCACAF Gold Cup qualification

== Honours ==
Inter Moengotapoe

- SVB Topklasse: 2015–16, 2018–19
- SVB Cup: 2018–19
- Suriname President's Cup: 2017, 2019
