= Jamilhio Rigters =

Surinamese footballers

Personal information
- Date of birth: 11 November 1999 (age 26)
- Place of birth: Paramaribo, Suriname
- Position: Left winger

Team information
- Current team: Robinhood

Senior career*
| Years | Team | Apps | (Gls) |
| 2017–2018 | West United | | |
| 2018–2025 | Robinhood | | |
| 2025–2026 | Cavalier | 24 | (1) |
| 2026– | Robinhood | 1 | (1) |

International career
| 2018 | Suriname U20 | 11 | (3) |
| 2022– | Suriname | 18 | (4) |
- * Club domestic league appearances and goals

Jamilhio Rigters (born 11 November 1999) is a Surinamese professional footballer who plays as a left winger for the Suriname Major League club Robinhood and the Suriname national team.

== International career ==
Rigters made his senior international debut on 28 January 2022 in a friendly against Barbados, scoring his first goal in the eventual 1–0 victory. Four days later he scored Suriname's two goals in a victory over Guyana in his second cap.

=== International goals ===
Scores and results list Suriname's goal tally first.

| No | Date | Venue | Opponent | Score | Result | Competition |
|---|---|---|---|---|---|---|
| 1. | 28 January 2022 | Dr. Ir. Franklin Essed Stadion, Paramaribo, Suriname | Barbados | 1–0 | 1–0 | Friendly |
| 2. | 1 February 2022 | Dr. Ir. Franklin Essed Stadion, Paramaribo, Suriname | Guyana | 1–0 | 2–1 | Friendly |
| 3. | 1 February 2022 | Dr. Ir. Franklin Essed Stadion, Paramaribo, Suriname | Guyana | 2–0 | 2–1 | Friendly |
| 4. | 26 November 2022 | Stadion Rignaal Jean Francisca, Willemstad, Curaçao | Curaçao | 2–1 | 2–2 (5-6 p.) | 2022 ABCS Tournament |
Last updated 3 December 2022

=== International career statistics ===
As of match played 1 February 2022

Suriname
| Year | Apps | Goals |
| 2022 | 2 | 3 |
| Total | 2 | 3 |

== Honours ==
West United

- SVB Cup runner-up: 2017–18

Robinhood

- Suriname Major League: 2024
- SVB Eerste Divisie: 2022, 2023
- Beker van Suriname: 2024
- Suriname President's Cup: 2024, 2024-25
- CONCACAF Caribbean Cup: 2023
- Caribbean Club Shield: 2019, 2023

Cavalier

- Jamaica Premier League: 2025
