= Gilberto Cronie =

Surinamese footballer (born 1996)

Personal information
- Full name: Gilberto Cronie
- Date of birth: 18 December 1996 (age 29)
- Place of birth: Paramaribo, Suriname
- Height: 1.70 m (5 ft 7 in)
- Positions: Forward; midfielder

Team information
- Current team: Robinhood
- Number: 23

Senior career*
Years	Team	Apps	(Gls)
2016–2023	Leo Victor		(5)
2023–2025	Inter Moengotapoe		
2025–	Robinhood		

International career
2019–2022	Suriname	12	(1)
- * Club domestic league appearances and goals

Gilberto Cronie (born 18 December 1996) is a Surinamese professional footballer who plays as a forward and midfielder for Suriname Major League club Robinhood.

== International career ==
Cronie debuted for Suriname in a 3–1 friendly victory over Guyana on 16 March 2019.

== Honours ==
Inter Moengotapoe

- SVB Cup: 2023
