= Suriname Major League =

Suriname Major League (SML)
- Organising body: Surinamese Football Association
- Founded: 22 February 2024
- First season: 2024
- Country: Suriname
- Confederation: CONCACAF
- Number of clubs: 10
- Level on pyramid: 1
- Relegation to: Eerste Divisie
- International cup(s): Regional; CFU Club Shield; CONCACAF Caribbean Cup; Continental; CONCACAF Champions Cup
- Current champions: Broki (2025–26)
- Most championships: Robinhood; Inter Moengotapoe; Broki (1 title each)
- Sponsor(s): Telesur, GOw2 & Powerade
- Website: https://sml.sr/
- Current: 2025–26 Suriname Major League

The Suriname Major League (SML) is the professional football league in Suriname.

The competition was launched on 22 February 2024, by the Surinamese Football Association as a successor to the SVB Eerste Divisie, formerly known as the SVB Hoofdklasse. With the start of the SML, professional football was introduced in Suriname, initially as a pilot project for the first four years. The first goal in SML history was scored by Jamilhio Rigters of S.V. Robinhood in the opening match on 23 February 2024, against S.V. Transvaal at the Dr. Ir. Franklin Essed Stadion. Following a goal from Jercinio Grendel of Transvaal, the match ended in a draw.

== Start of professional football ==
Even before its commencement in 2024, it was common for footballers to have contracts with clubs. At the outset, it was assumed that not all players would derive their entire income from football, and it was expected to include both professional and semi-professional players. During the official launch on 22 February 2024, SVB President John Krishnadath expressed the expectation that the professionalization of Surinamese football would create around 250 to 500 jobs. Not only the players but also the club owners will benefit from the competition.

The goal of the SML is to accelerate the development of Surinamese football. FIFA representative Herve Blanchard, as well as Minister Gracia Emanuël and Suriname Olympic Committee President Ramon Tjon-A-Fat, were present at the launch.

== Teams ==
The Suriname Major League started in 2024 with the following teams:

Team	Location	Stadium	Capacity	Joined	Head coach
Flora FC	Flora, Paramaribo District	Dr. Ir. Franklin Essed Stadion	3,500	2024	Rafael Everton
F.C. Inter Wanica	Meerzorg, Commewijne District	Meerzorg Stadion	1,300	2024	Eugenne Remak
Inter Moengotapoe	Moengo, Marowijne District	Ronnie Brunswijkstadion	3,000	2024	Ronnie Brunswijk
Politie Voetbal Vrienden	Paramaribo, Paramaribo District	Mgr. Aloysius Zichem Sportcentrum	3,000	2024	Hesron Jeroe
S.V. Broki	Abrabroki, Paramaribo District	Mgr. Aloysius Zichem Sportcentrum	3,000	2024	Henk Verveer (Assistant)
S.V. Leo Victor	Paramaribo, Paramaribo District	Dr. Ir. Franklin Essed Stadion	3,500	2024	Rogillo Kolf
S.V. Notch	Moengo, Marowijne District	Moengo Stadion	2,000	2024	Rafael Everton
S.V. Robinhood	Paramaribo, Paramaribo District	Dr. Ir. Franklin Essed Stadion	3,500	2024	Roberto Godeken
S.V. Transvaal	Paramaribo, Paramaribo District	André Kamperveen Stadion	7,100	2024	Raymond Mannen
S.V. Voorwaarts	Paramaribo, Paramaribo District	Voorwaartsveld	1,500	2024	Werner Blackson

== Titles by club ==
Club	City	Titles	Winning years
Robinhood	Paramaribo	1	2024
Inter Moengotapoe	Moengo	1	2025
Broki	Abrabroki	1	2025–26

== See also ==
- Football in Suriname
- List of football clubs in Suriname
