= Purcy de Baas =

Surinamese footballer (born 1995)

Personal information
- Full name: Purcy Sergio de Baas
- Date of birth: 2 March 1995 (age 31)
- Place of birth: Paramaribo, Suriname
- Height: 1.90 m (6 ft 3 in)
- Position: Centre-back

Team information
- Current team: Leo Victor

Senior career*
Years	Team	Apps	(Gls)
2014–	Leo Victor		

International career
2018–2019	Suriname	5	(0)
- * Club domestic league appearances and goals

Purcy Sergio de Baas (born 2 March 1995) is a Surinamese professional footballer who plays as a centre-back for Suriname Major League club Leo Victor.

== International career ==
De Baas made his debut for Suriname in a 4–0 win over French Guiana on 18 August 2018.
