= Sergino (given name) =

Sergino is a given name. Notable people with the name include:

- Sergiño Dest (born 2000), Dutch-American soccer player
- Sergino Eduard (born 1994), Surinamese footballer

== See also ==
- Sergio (given name)
