= Jaliens =

Jaliens is a surname. Notable people with the surname include:

- Kenneth Jaliens (born 1957), Surinamese football coach, uncle of Kew
- Kew Jaliens (born 1978), Dutch footballer
