= Abraham Graves =

Surinamese footballer (born 1999)

Personal information
- Full name: Abraham Graves
- Date of birth: 5 October 1999 (age 27)
- Place of birth: Paramaribo, Suriname
- Height: 1.87 m (6 ft 2 in)
- Position: Defensive midfielder

Team information
- Current team: PVV

Senior career*
Years	Team	Apps	(Gls)
2018–2019	Robinhood		
2019–	PVV		

International career
2018	Suriname U20	4	(0)
2019–2022	Suriname	7	(0)
- * Club domestic league appearances and goals

Abraham Graves (born 5 October 1999) is a Surinamese professional footballer who plays as a defensive midfielder for Suriname Major League club PVV.

== International career ==
Graves made his debut for Suriname in a 3–1 friendly victory over Guyana on 16 March 2019.
