= Miquel Darson =

Surinamese international footballer

Personal information
- Full name: Miquel Danny Darson
- Date of birth: 27 May 1993 (age 33)
- Place of birth: Paramaribo, Suriname
- Height: 1.63 m (5 ft 4 in)
- Position: Right back

Senior career*
Years	Team	Apps	(Gls)
2013–2015	S.V. Transvaal		
2015–2016	S.V. Notch		
2016–	Inter Moengotapoe		

International career^{‡}
2012	Suriname U20	6	(2)
2011	Suriname U23	6	(0)
2013–	Suriname	23	(0)
- * Club domestic league appearances and goals as of 11:00, 2 October 2020 (UTC) ‡ National team caps and goals as of 11:00, 2 October 2020 (UTC)

Miquel Danny Darson (born 27 May 1993) is a Surinamese international footballer who plays as a right back for SVB Topklasse side Inter Moengotapoe.

== International career ==
Darson was part of the Suriname squad that won the 2013 ABCS Tournament. He was called up again in 2015 for a World Cup qualifying games against Nicaragua and the 2015 ABCS Tournament however he failed to feature in any games in 2015.

In 2016, Darson was recalled to the Suriname squad for the fifth place playoff of 2017 Caribbean Cup qualification. He featured in both games as Suriname shocked Trinidad and Tobago by beating them 2–1, and then in the 4–2 defeat to Haiti, which left Suriname unable to qualify for the 2017 CONCACAF Gold Cup.

== Career statistics ==
=== International ===
As of matches played 2 October 2020.

National team	Year	Apps	Goals
Suriname	2013	2	0
Suriname	2014	5	0
Suriname	2015	0	0
Suriname	2016	4	0
Suriname	2017	2	0
Suriname	2018	4	0
Suriname	2019	6	0
Suriname	2020	0	0
Total		23	0
