= Max Nijman =

Surinamese singer (1941–2016)

- Birth name: Max Reinier Nijman
- Also known as: Soulman Number One
- Born: March 18, 1941; Moengo, Suriname
- Died: January 19, 2016 (aged 74); Leiderdorp, Netherlands
- Genres: Soul, kaseko, latin ballad, reggae
- Occupation: Singer
- Years active: 1957–2012

Max Reinier Nijman (March 18, 1941 – January 19, 2016) was a Surinamese singer. His song "Adjosi" ("Adieu"), which sings of the homesickness of Surinamese expatriates, became his signature song, and he is one of Suriname's icons.

== Biography ==
Nijman was born in Moengo, as the eighth of sixteen children. Gifted with a natural talent, he started singing in English, with cover versions of American soul and R&B artists, and had a breakthrough performance at age 16, singing a Brook Benton song at a football game. He then moved on to singing in Sranan.

In 1968, Nijman gave a well-attended farewell performance in Paramaribo (transmitted live on television) and moved to the Netherlands, where he signed to Dureco and released his debut solo-album Katibo in 1975. Besides the title track and "Ai Sranang", the song "Adjosi" became his best known song. He then released the albums Wan Dei Lobi with The Stan Lokhin Band in 1977 and Ini Wan De in 1978.

In 2014, the label TopNotch released a compilation album of Nijman within a series named Sranan Gowtu (Surinamese Gold) devoted to Surinamese artists from the 1970s.

Nijman died in Leiderdorp, Netherlands at the age of 74 on January 19, 2016. A grand farewell ceremony was held at the Paradiso. On January 30, 2016, he was buried in Paramaribo.

== Discography ==
Albums

- 1975 Katibo
- 1977 Wan Dei Lobi
- 1978 Ini Wan Dé
