= Obrendo Huiswoud =

Surinamese footballer

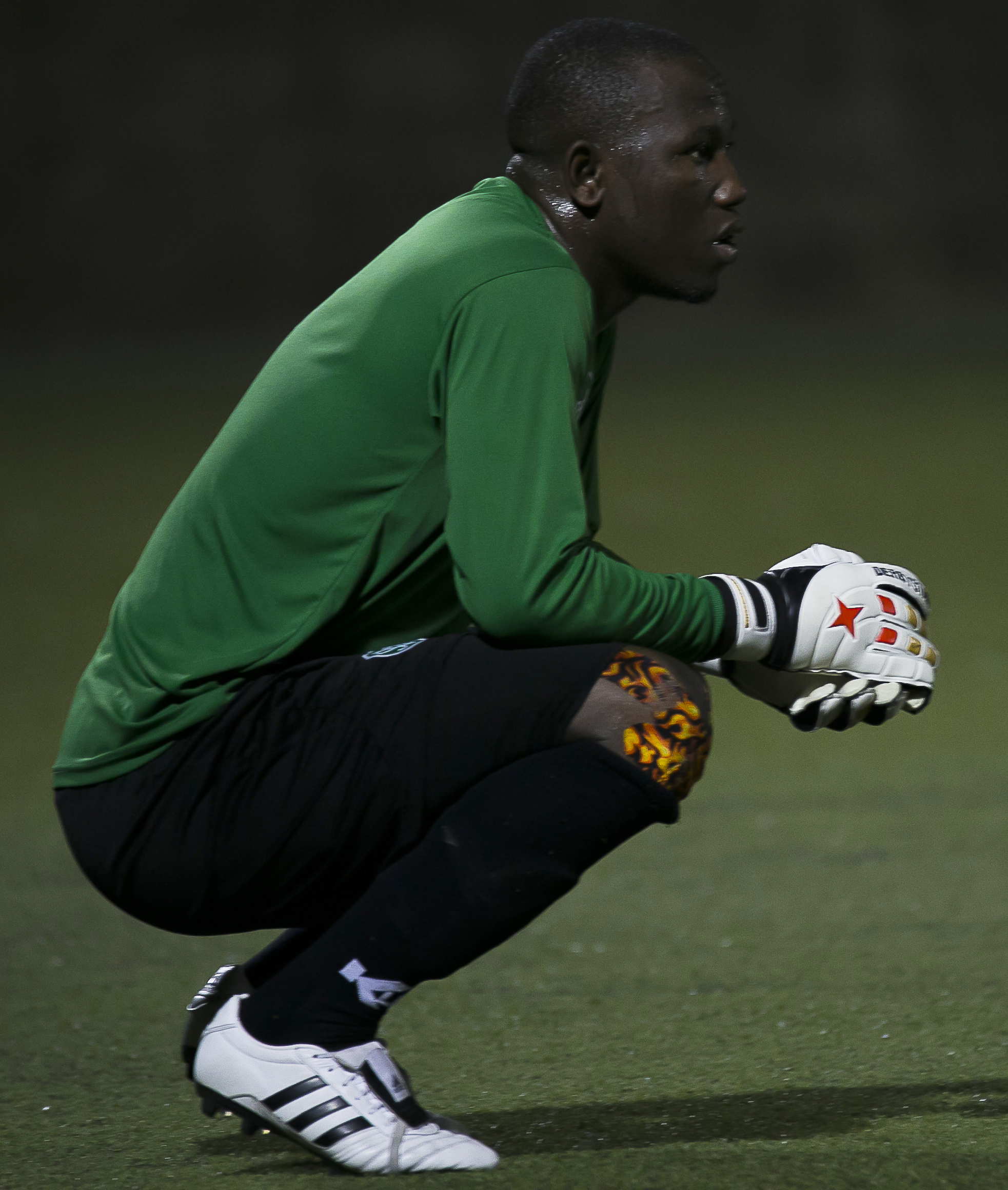
- Huiswoud (center)

Personal information
- Full name: Obrendo Jurgen Huiswoud
- Date of birth: 6 December 1990 (age 35)
- Place of birth: Suriname
- Position: Goalkeeper

Team information
- Current team: Inter Moengotapoe
- Number: 30

Senior career*
Years	Team	Apps	(Gls)
2009–2013	Voorwaarts	?	(0)
2013–2022	Inter Moengotapoe	40	(0)
2022–	Real Sranang	0	(0)

International career^{‡}
2010–	Suriname	27	(0)
- * Club domestic league appearances and goals as of 9 January 2023 ‡ National team caps and goals as of 17 July 2021

Obrendo Huiswoud (born 6 December 1990) is a Surinamese professional footballer who currently plays for Inter Moengotapoe. As the starting goalkeeper, Huiswoud has also been capped on multiple occasions for the Suriname national football team. Huiswoud also did a trial with W Connection for 2 weeks in 2013.

== Honours ==
=== Club ===
Inter Moengotapoe

- Hoofdklasse champion: 2014, 2015, 2016, 2017, 2019

=== Individual ===
- Surinamese Footballer of the Year: 2014
