= Ronaldo Kemble =

Surinamese footballer

Personal information
- Date of birth: 24 July 1997 (age 29)
- Place of birth: Nieuw Nickerie, Suriname
- Height: 1.88 m (6 ft 2 in)
- Position: Defender

Team information
- Current team: Transvaal

Senior career*
Years	Team	Apps	(Gls)
2017–2020	Transvaal		
2020–	Inter Moengotapoe		

International career^{‡}
2019–	Suriname	7	(0)
- * Club domestic league appearances and goals ‡ National team caps and goals as of 21 May 2020

Ronaldo Kemble (born 24 July 1997) is a Surinamese footballer who plays as a defender for S.V. Transvaal and the Suriname national football team.

== Early life ==
Kembele grew up in Nieuw Nickerie in Suriname.

== Career ==
=== International ===
Kemble made his senior international debut on 16 March 2019, playing the entirety of a 3-1 friendly victory over Guyana.

== Career statistics ==
=== International ===
As of matches played 18 November 2019.

National team	Year	Apps	Goals
Suriname	2019	7	0
Total		7	0
