= Naldo Kwasie =

Surinamese footballer

Personal information
- Full name: Naldo Braidner Kwasie
- Date of birth: 20 April 1986 (age 40)
- Place of birth: Paramaribo, Suriname
- Height: 1.74 m (5 ft 9 in)
- Position: Defender

Team information
- Current team: Inter Moengotapoe
- Number: 99

Senior career*
| Years | Team | Apps | (Gls) |
| 2009–2011 | Transvaal | | |
| 2011– | Inter Moengotapoe | | |

International career^{‡}
| 2010–2014 | Suriname | 27 | (2) |
- * Club domestic league appearances and goals as of 25 May 2021 ‡ National team caps and goals as of 25 May 2021

Naldo Braidner Kwasie (born 20 April 1986) is a Surinamese footballer who plays as a defender for Inter Moengotapoe. He played for Suriname in 2014 FIFA World Cup qualifying.

== International career ==
=== International goals ===
Scores and results list Suriname's goal tally first.

| No | Date | Venue | Cap | Opponent | Score | Result | Competition |
|---|---|---|---|---|---|---|---|
| 1. | 14 November 2010 | Antigua Recreation Ground, St. John's, Antigua and Barbuda | 8 | Dominica | 1–0 | 5–0 | 2010 Caribbean Cup qualification |
| 2. | 11 October 2011 | André Kamperveen Stadion, Paramaribo, Suriname | 14 | Dominican Republic | 1–3 | 1–3 | 2014 FIFA World Cup qualification |
