= Flora FC =

- Full name: Flora Football Club
- Founded: August 2008; 18 years ago
- Ground: Dr. Ir. Franklin Essed Stadion, Flora
- Capacity: 3,500
- League: Suriname Major League
- 2025: SML, Regular season: 9th Playoffs: Did not qualify
Home colours	Away colours	Third colours

Flora FC is a Surinamese association football club in the city resort of Flora in the capital Paramaribo. The club is based in the Dr. Ir. Franklin Essed Stadion in Flora.

Since the launch of professional football on February 22, 2024, Flora is competing in the professional Suriname Major League.

In the 2010s, Flora was playing in the SVB Tweede Divisie of the Surinamese Football Association (SVB).

== See also ==
- Football in Suriname
- List of football clubs in Suriname
