= Roberto Gödeken =

Surinamese football manager

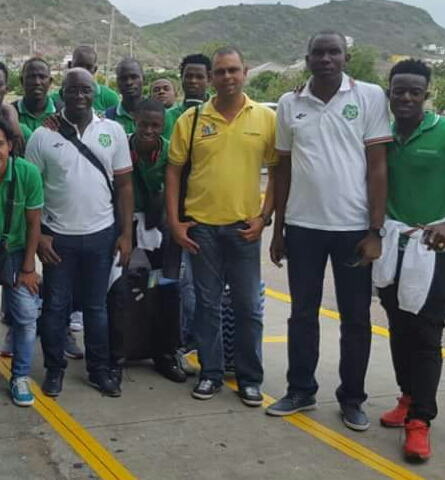
- Gödeken in yellow

Personal information
- Place of birth: Paramaribo, Suriname

Managerial career
- Years: Team
- 2013–2015: Suriname (interim)
- 2016–2017: Nishan 42
- 2016–2017: Suriname (interim)
- 2017–: Robinhood
- 2022–: Suriname (assistant)
- 2022: Suriname (interim)

Roberto Gödeken is a Surinamese football manager.

== Career ==
Since October 2013 he coached the Suriname national team. He is also coaching SV Nishan 42. In 2015, he got put aside as interim coach and was replaced by Dean Gorré. In February 2016 he became coach once again of Suriname.
