= Kenneth Jaliens =

Surinamese football manager

Ken Jaliens
Personal information
- Full name: Kenneth Jaliens
- Date of birth: 4 October 1957 (age 69)
- Place of birth: Paramaribo, Suriname

Team information
- Current team: Suriname

Senior career*
Years	Team	Apps	(Gls)
- Voorwaarts

Managerial career
- 2006–2008: Suriname
- 2008–2009: Suriname (technical director)
- 2009–2011: Voorwaarts
- 2011–2012: Suriname
- 201?–2019: Voorwaarts
- 2019–2022: Transvaal
- * Club domestic league appearances and goals

Kenneth Jaliens (born 4 October 1957 in Paramaribo) is the current technical director of the Suriname national team.

== Coaching career ==
Jaliens led Suriname to stage two of the Caribbean Nations Cup 2006-07 and the 2010 FIFA World Cup qualification.

== Personal life ==
He is married to Sheila Jaliens and is the uncle of Kew Jaliens.
