= S.C.V. Bintang Lahir =

Football club in Groningen, Suriname

Bintang Lahir
- Full name: Sportclub Viktoria Bintang Lahir
- Founded: 1987; 38 years ago
- Stadium: André Kamperveen Stadion
- Capacity: 6,000
- League: Tweede Divisie
- 2023: Eerste Divisie, 14th of 14 (withdrew)
Home colours	Away colours	Third colours

S.C.V. Bintang Lahir is a football club located in Groningen, Suriname. Their home games are played at the André Kamperveen Stadion in Paramaribo, and the division they play in is the Tweede Divisie, the third highest tier in Surinamese football.

== History ==
Bintang Lahir was founded in 1987. In the 2017–18 season, the club won the third tier of Surinamese football, the SVB Derde Divisie, and were promoted to the SVB Tweede Divisie. They achieved a consecutive promotion by finishing runners-up in the second division in the 2018–19 season, therefore securing a spot in the 2019–20 SVB Eerste Divisie.

== Notable players ==
Vangelino Sastromedjo Renske Adipi

== Honours ==
S.C.V. Bintang Lahir honours
Honours	No.	Years
Meerzorg Sportbond League	1	2017
Derde Divisie	1	2017–18
Tweede Divisie runner-up	1	2018–19
