= Moengo Stadion =

Football stadium in Suriname

- Interactive map of Moengo Stadion
- Location: Moengo, Suriname
- Coordinates: 5°37′16″N 54°24′7″W
- Owner: City of Moengo
- Operator: Moengo Sport Bond
- Capacity: 2,000
- Surface: Grass

Tenants
- Inter Moengotapoe (1992–2002); Notch (2003–)

Moengo Stadion is a football stadium in Moengo, Suriname. It is the home stadium of football club S.V. Notch competing in the SVB Hoofdklasse. The stadium holds 2,000.
