= Romeo Kastiel =

Surinamese footballer

Personal information
- Full name: Romeo Kastiel
- Date of birth: 5 May 1993 (age 33)
- Place of birth: Paramaribo, Suriname
- Height: 1.60 m (5 ft 3 in)
- Position: Forward

Team information
- Current team: Inter Moengotapoe
- Number: 24

Senior career*
Years	Team	Apps	(Gls)
2015–2018	Inter Moengotapoe		(18)
2018	Agouado		
2019–	Inter Moengotapoe		(22)

International career^{‡}
2016	Suriname	1	(0)
- * Club domestic league appearances and goals as of 23 May 2021 ‡ National team caps and goals as of 23 May 2021

Romeo Kastiel (born 5 May 1993) is a Surinamese footballer who plays as a forward for Inter Moengotapoe.

== International career ==
On 29 March 2016, Kastiel made his debut for Suriname in a 2017 Caribbean Cup qualification match against Guadeloupe.
