= SVB Cup =

- Founded: 1992
- Region: Suriname
- Teams: 35
- Current champions: Robinhood (9th title)
- Most championships: Robinhood (9 titles)
- 2025 SVB Cup

The SVB Cup (Dutch: Beker van Suriname) is a competition organized by the Surinamese Football Association (Dutch: Surinaamse Voetbal Bond (SVB)) since 1992. It was based on the size of the KNVB Cup. The tournament consists of all teams from the top two layers of the Surinamese Football League Eerste Divisie and District Divisions.

== History ==
The tournament began in the 1992 season. The first champion was the PVV. In 2007, the SV Robinhood won for the fifth time, becoming the largest tournament champion.

== Past finals ==
Season	Winner	Scorers	Result	Runner-up	Scorers	Venue	Attendance
1992	PVV		3–2 (aet)	SNL			
1996	Transvaal		2–1 (aet)	Voorwaarts			
1997	Robinhood		1–0 (asdet)	Transvaal			
1999	Robinhood						
2001	Robinhood						
2002	Transvaal		0–0 (5–4 pens)	Robinhood			
2003	Leo Victor		3–2	Robinhood			
2004	Super Red Eagles		2–1	WBC			
2005	FCS Nacional		3–1	Robinhood			
2006	Robinhood		1–1 (7–6 pens)	Inter Moengotapoe			
2007	SV Robinhood		1–1 (4–1 pens)	WBC			
2008	Transvaal		0–0 (won on penalties)	Notch			
2009	WBC	Sandvliet 4'; Aroepa 32' 74'; Sordjo 39'; Zebeda 45' (pen) 68' (pen)	6–6 (5–3 pen)	Inter Moengotapoe	Pinas 22' 65'; Adensiba 66' 82' (pen) 88'; Brunswijk 72'		
2010	Excelsior		2–0	Takdier Boys			
2011	Notch		4–2	Walking Boyz Company			
2012	Inter Moengotapoe		5–2	Excelsior			
2013	WBC		1–1 (4-3 pens)	Takdier Boys			
2014	Leo Victor		4–2	Notch			
2015	Nishan 42	Andrew Murray 28'	1–0	Inter Moengotapoe		André Kamperveen Stadion	
2016	Robinhood		1–1 (4–3 pens)	WBC		Dr. Ir. Franklin Essed Stadion	
2017	Inter Moengotapoe		3–3 (4–3 pens)	Papatam			
2018	Robinhood		7–1	West United		Dr. Ir. Franklin Essed Stadion	
2019	Inter Moengotapoe		1–1 (4–2 pens)	Flora			
2023	Inter Moengotapoe		4-1	Notch		Dr. Ir. Franklin Essed Stadion	
2024	Robinhood		5-0	Inter Moengotapoe		Dr. Ir. Franklin Essed Stadion	
2025	Robinhood		5-1	Leo Victor		Dr. Ir. Franklin Essed Stadion	
2026	Voorwaarts		0-0 (4-3 pens)	Transvaal		Dr. Ir. Franklin Essed Stadion	

=== Number of titles ===
	Club	# Wins	Winning years
1	Robinhood	9	1997, 1999, 2001, 2006, 2007, 2016, 2018, 2024, 2025
2	Inter Moengotapoe	4	2012, 2017, 2019, 2023
3	Transvaal	3	1996, 2002, 2008
4	WBC	2	2009, 2013
4	Leo Victor	2	2003, 2014
6	FCS Nacional	1	2005
6	Super Red Eagles	1	2004
6	PVV	1	1992
6	Excelsior	1	2010
6	Notch	1	2011
6	Voorwaarts	1	2025-26
6	Nishan 42	1	2015
