= S.V. Broki =

Surinamese football club

Broki
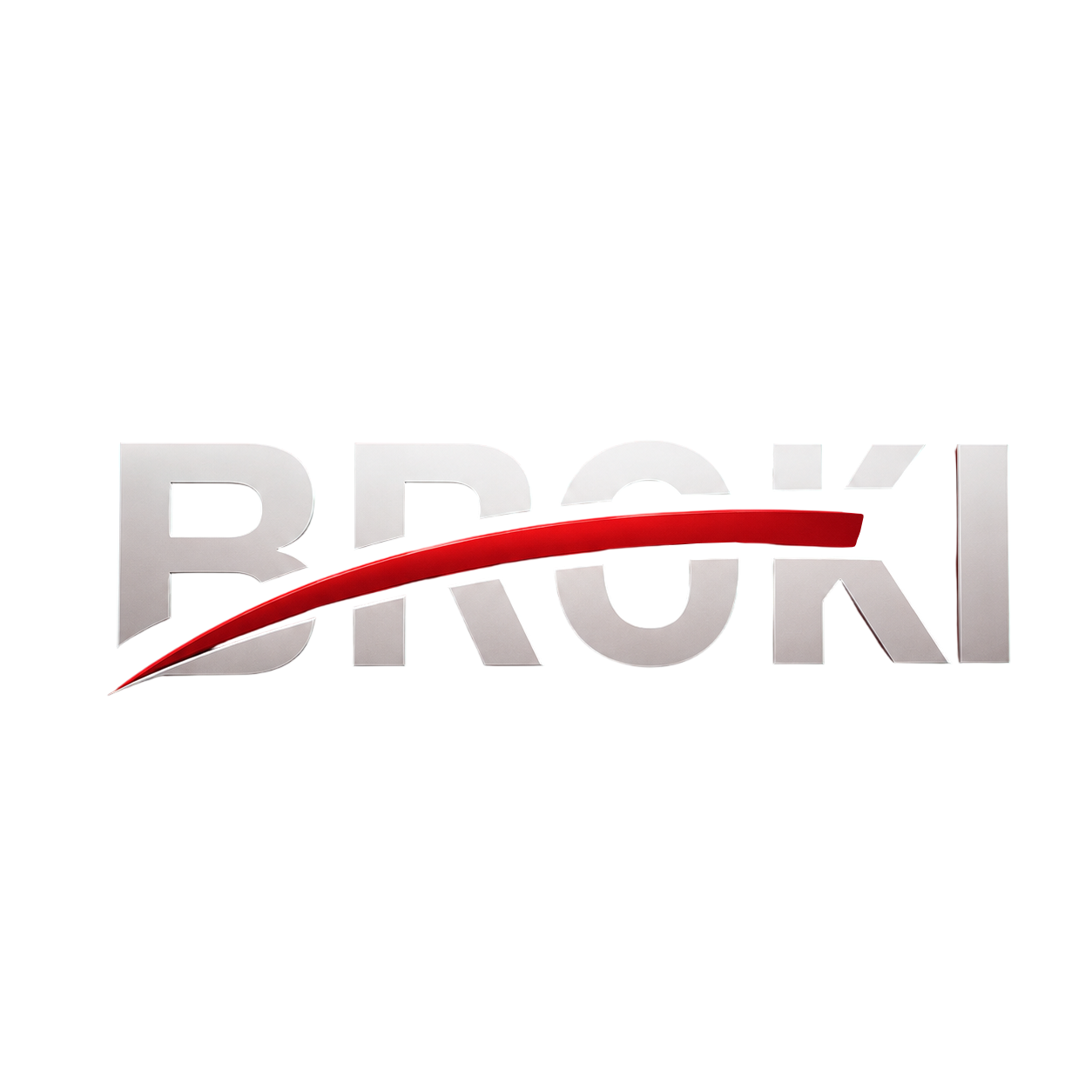
- Full name: Sportvereniging Broki
- Ground: Mgr. Aloysius Zichem Sportcentrum
- Capacity: 3,000
- League: Suriname Major League
- 2024: SML, Regular season: 10th Playoffs: Did not qualify
Home colours	Away colours	Third colours

Sportvereniging Broki is a football club located in the Abrabroki neighbourhood of Paramaribo, Suriname. It competes in the Suriname Major League, the highest division of Surinamese football. The club's home ground is the Mgr. Aloysius Zichem Sportcentrum.

Broki won promotion to the first tier after finishing second in the 2017–18 SVB Tweede Divisie.

Since the launch of professional football on February 22, 2024, S.V. Broki is competing in the professional Suriname Major League.

== Performance in CONCACAF competitions ==
The following is a list of results for S.V. Broki in international competitions. S.V. Broki's scores are listed first.

Year	Tournament	Round	Opponent	Home	Away	Agg.
2026	CONCACAF Caribbean Cup	Group Stage	(Trinidad and Tobago) Club Sando		1–2	
2026	CONCACAF Caribbean Cup	Group Stage	(Trinidad and Tobago) Defence Force		1–2	
2026	CONCACAF Caribbean Cup	Group Stage	(Dominican Republic) Delfines del Este	0–0		
2026	CONCACAF Caribbean Cup	Group Stage	(Haiti) Violette	1–2		

== Honours ==
S.V. Broki honours
Honour	No.	Years
Suriname Major League champions	1	2025–26
SVB Tweede Divisie runner-up	1	2017–18
