= Voorwaartsveld =

Football stadium in Paramaribo, Suriname

- Interactive map of Voorwaartsveld
- Location: Paramaribo, Suriname
- Coordinates: 5°48′39.16″N 55°12′30.55″W
- Owner: SV Voorwaarts
- Capacity: 1,500
- Surface: Grass

Construction
- Opened: 1 August 1919

Tenant
- Voorwaarts (1919–)

Voorwaartsveld is an association football stadium in Paramaribo, Suriname. It is home to SVB Hoofdklasse club SV Voorwaarts, the oldest association football club in the country that is still active. The stadium seats 1,500 people.

== Location ==
The Voorwaartsveld is located on the SV Voorwaartslaan behind the NIS (Anthony Nesty Sporthal) in the southern part of Paramaribo. It is on the east end of the Jaggernath Lachmonstraat.
