= Meerzorg Stadion =

- Interactive map of Meerzorg Stadion
- Location: Meerzorg, Suriname
- Coordinates: 5°47′58″N 55°07′17″W
- Owner: District of Commewijne
- Operator: Meerzorg Sport Bond
- Capacity: 1,300
- Surface: Grass

Tenants
- Excelsior; Nishan 42

Meerzorg Stadion is a multi-purpose stadium in Meerzorg, Suriname. It is home to both SVB Hoofdklasse clubs SV Excelsior and SV Nishan 42. The stadium has a capacity of 1,300 people

== Location ==
The Meerzorg Stadium is located along the Oost-Westverbinding in the Southeast part of Meerzorg, Commewijne District across the Suriname river from the capital city Paramaribo.
