= Mgr. Aloysius Zichem Sportcentrum =

Football stadium in Paramaribo, Suriname

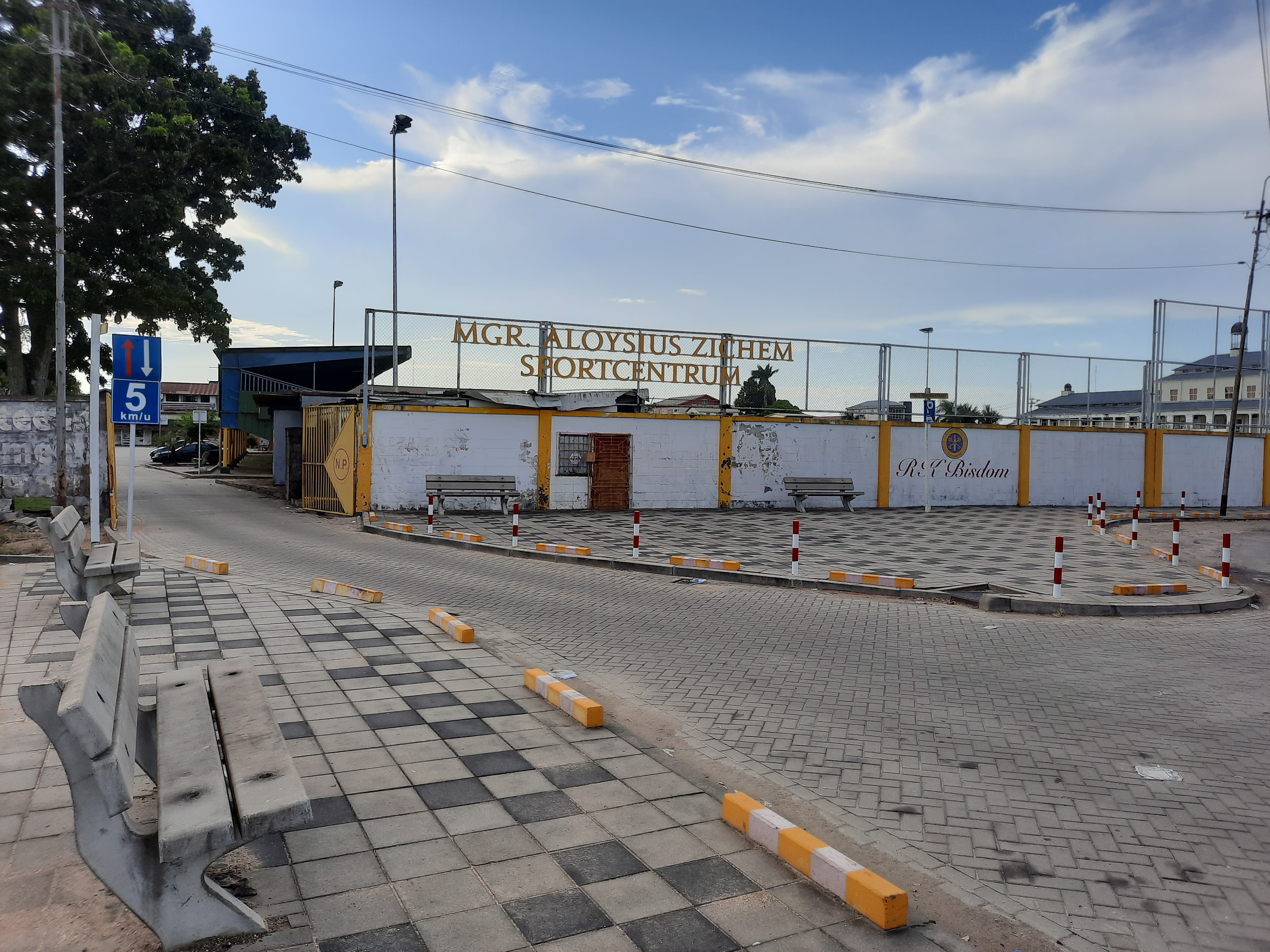
- Interactive map of Mgr. Aloysius Zichem Sportcentrum
- Location: Paramaribo, Suriname
- Coordinates: 5°49′49.02″N 55°9′9.83″W
- Owner: City and District of Paramaribo
- Operator: Nieuwe Generatie Voetbal Bond
- Capacity: 3,000
- Surface: Grass

Construction
- Opened: 4 June 1961

Tenants
- Politie Voetbal Vereniging; S.V. Broki

The Mgr. Aloysius Zichem Sportcentrum, formerly called NGVB Stadion, is an association football stadium in Paramaribo, Suriname. It is home to SVB Eerste Divisie club PVV, the football club of the Surinamese police force. S.V. Broki is also a resident of the stadium. The stadium is owned and operated by the N.G.V.B. a member association of the SVB. The Sportcentrum received its current name after the decease of Mgr. Aloysius Zichem (1933-2016), the former bishop of Paramaribo.

The Mgr. Aloysius Zichem Sportcentrum is located near the centre, in Southwestern part of Paramaribo on the Prins Hendrikstraat.

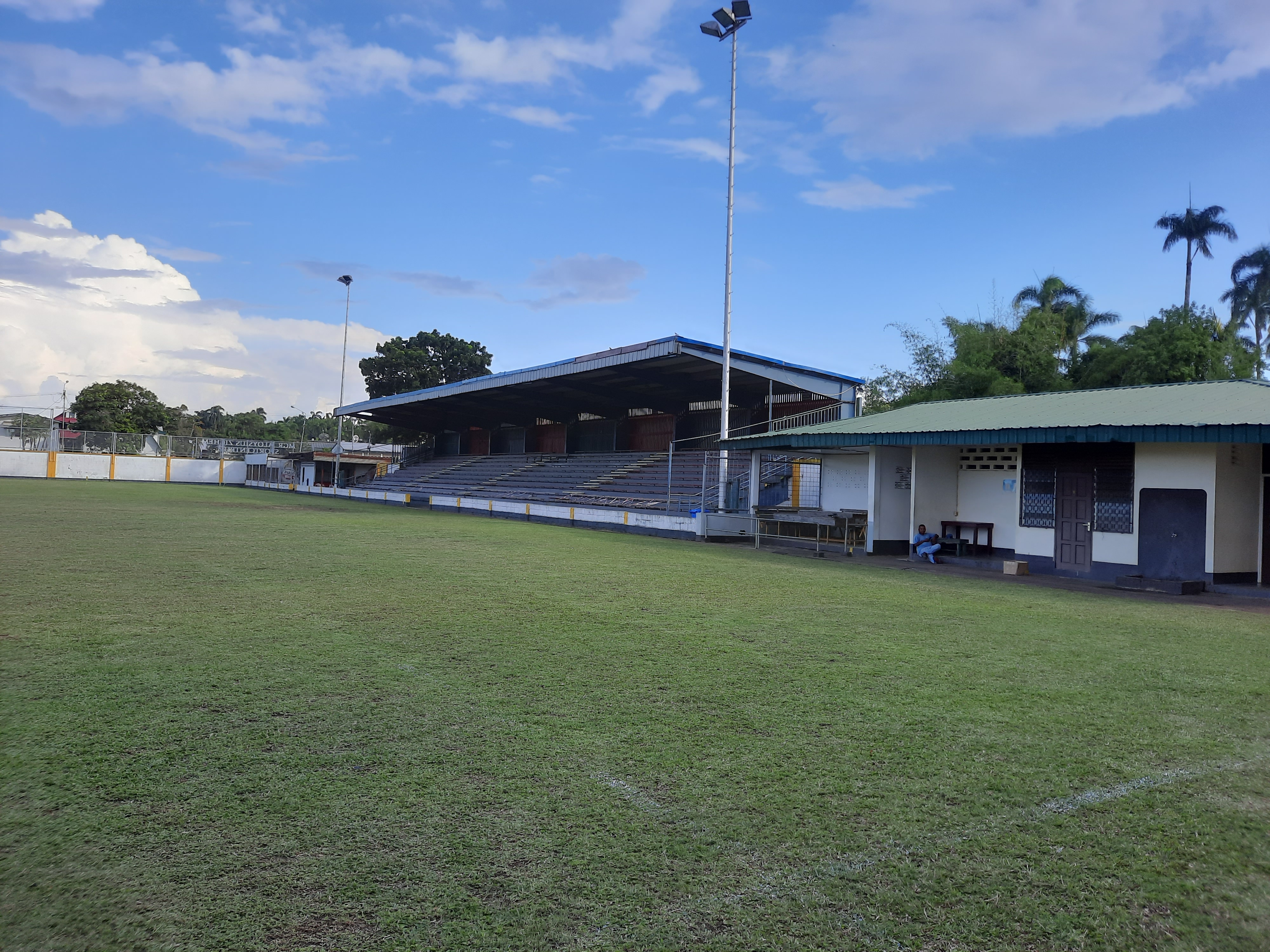
The tribune of the station
