= N.V. Dash F.C. Inter Wanica =

Football club in Meerzorg, Suriname

Inter Wanica
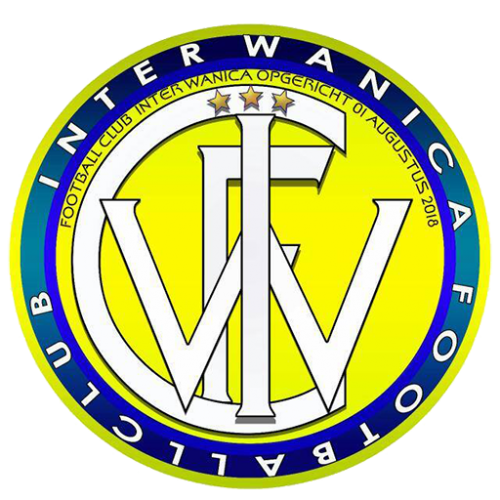
- Full name: Nishan Vereniging Dash Football Club Inter Wanica
- Founded: 2 August 1942; 84 years ago
- Ground: Meerzorg Stadion; Meerzorg, Suriname
- Manager: Eugenne Remak
- League: Suriname Major League
- 2025: SML, Regular season: 8th Playoffs: Did not qualify
Home colours	Away colours

N.V. Dash F.C. Inter Wanica, referred to as Inter Wanica, is a football club located in Meerzorg, Suriname.

Since the launch of professional football on February 22, 2024, Inter Wanica is competing in the professional Suriname Major League.

== History ==
The club was founded in 1942 as Nishan 42.

They played their first season in the SVB Hoofdklasse in 2015–16, following promotion from the SVB Eerste Klasse. They won their first SVB Cup, Suriname's top cup tournament, during the 2014–15 season. Then they played the President's Cup in 2015 and won it for the first time also.

The club changed its name from S.V. Nishan 42 to its current name in 2019.

== Notable former coaches ==
- (Suriname) Roberto Gödeken (2014–2017)

== Honours ==
- Beker van Suriname: 1

2014–15

- Suriname President's Cup: 1

2015

- SVB Tweede Divisie: 1

2014–15

== Current squad ==
2022 Squads Note: Flags indicate national team as defined under FIFA eligibility rules; some limited exceptions apply. Players may hold more than one non-FIFA nationality.

No.	Pos.	Nation	Player
1	GK	BRA	Dion
2	DF	SUR	Derrick Fris
3	DF	SUR	Shaquille Pengel
4	MF	SUR	Cherokee Samalobie
5	DF	SUR	Kendrige Fleur
6	FW	SUR	Shawn Tjokrodimedjo
7	MF	SUR	Rosario Hoogland
8	MF	BRA	Filipe Barbosa
9	FW	SUR	Donogy Kago
10	FW	SUR	Cheraino Adinda
11	MF	SUR	Myroy Koeba
12	FW	SUR	Rowana Johannis

No.	Pos.	Nation	Player
13	MF	SUR	Ivan Kakie
14	MF	SUR	Rodinhio Pinas
15	DF	SUR	Donjeul Macnack
16	FW	SUR	Ronajel Forster
17	MF	SUR	Daninhio Gill
18	DF	SUR	Franstino Lim Hok Koen
19	FW	SUR	Romario Landolf
20	MF	SUR	Djomero Sampake
24	DF	BRA	Abmael
25	MF	SUR	Xanvier Antini
27	MF	SUR	Jean-Pierre Tjoen A Choy
32	GK	SUR	Fabian Toemere
