= Politie Voetbal Vrienden =

Surinamese football club

PVV
- Full name: Politie Voetbal Vrienden
- Founded: 1 September 1924; 101 years ago
- Ground: Mgr. Aloysius Zichem Sportcentrum; Paramaribo, Suriname
- Capacity: 3,000
- Manager: Hesron Jeroe
- League: Suriname Major League
- 2025: SML, Regular season: 5th Playoffs: vice champions
Home colours	Away colours

Politie Voetbal Vrienden ('Police Football Friends'), until 2018 Politie Voetbal Vereniging ('Police Football Association'), known as PVV, is a Surinamese football club from the capital city Paramaribo.

Since the launch of professional football on February 22, 2024, PVV is competing in the professional Suriname Major League.

== History ==
Founded on 1 September 1924 as SPSV (Surinaamse Politie Sport Vereniging), and serving as the football club of the local Police force, the club name was changed to P.V.V. (Politie Voetbal Vereniging) on 6 February 1945. They were the first club to win the Surinamese Cup, winning against SNL 3–2 after extra time in the final. SNL are the football club of the Surinamese military, seeing the first National Cup to be contested between the police and the military. Brian Cameron and Mark Ronde (2x) scored for PVV in the final, while Ewald Demidof (2x) scored for SNL.

On 23 July 1935, PVV defeated DRD 11–2 in the Surinamese Hoofdklasse, the league record for highest scoring match. Hans Nahar scored 7 goals in the match for PVV, which is also a record for most goals scored in a single match. The record for most goals scored was reached by SV Voorwaarts player Purcy Samsey on 26 June 1955, before Louis Mijnals of SV Robinhood improved the record on 26 November 1961. It is also worth mentioning that PVV lost their following match to MVV 8–1 on 2 August 1935.

In 1993 the club also won the Suriname President's Cup defeating S.V. Transvaal 2–1 in the final. Since the 2011–12 season, PVV have been relegated to the amateur district leagues in Suriname. In 2015 the club returned to the Eerste Klasse. In 2018 the club changed its name to Politie Voetbal Vrienden.

== Honours ==
- SVB Cup: 1

1992

- Suriname President's Cup: 1

1993

== Current squad ==
2022 Squads Note: Flags indicate national team as defined under FIFA eligibility rules; some limited exceptions apply. Players may hold more than one non-FIFA nationality.

No.	Pos.	Nation	Player
1	GK	SUR	Domelcio Fer
2	DF	SUR	Ivanildo Banwarie
3	DF	SUR	Milano Boobe
4	DF	SUR	Courdny Pita
5	MF	SUR	Farycio Finisie
6	FW	SUR	Anthony Thalia
7	MF	SUR	Ayad Godlieb
8	MF	SUR	Milito Brewster
9	FW	SUR	Garvey Kwelling
10	MF	SUR	Abraham Graves
11	MF	SUR	Lorenzo Soerowidjojo
12	MF	SUR	Junior Bomisa
13	DF	SUR	Rico Rogers

No.	Pos.	Nation	Player
14	MF	SUR	Brian Elshot
15	FW	SUR	Faisijo Burnet
16	FW	SUR	Kevin Palan
17	MF	SUR	Nazario Doesburg
18	MF	SUR	Orveo Anautan
19	DF	SUR	Marcel Pallees
20	MF	SUR	Renzo Akrosie
21	MF	SUR	Fawstino Benali
25	FW	SUR	Shaquille Petrusi
29	MF	SUR	Gideon Seymonson
30	FW	SUR	Donovan Dieko
31	GK	SUR	Fhabrisio Saling
32	GK	SUR	Endro Esperancie

== See also ==
- PSV Nickerie
