= Ronnie Brunswijkstadion =

Football stadium in Moengo, Suriname

Coordinates: 5°37′16.62″N 54°24′5.5″W

- Interactive map of Ronnie Brunswijkstadion
- Location: Moengo, Suriname
- Owner: Ronnie Brunswijk
- Capacity: 3,000
- Surface: Grass

Construction
- Opened: 2002

Tenants
- Inter Moengotapoe (2002–); Real Moengotapoe (2018–)

Ronnie Brunswijkstadion (English: Ronnie Brunswick Stadium) is an association football stadium located in Moengo, Suriname. The stadium is owned and operated by the Surinamese politician Ronnie Brunswijk, and the main tenant is Inter Moengotapoe, a football club that competes in Suriname's top league, the Topklasse. The capacity is around 3,000.
