= Inter Moengotapoe =

Association football club in Suriname

- Full name: Stichting Inter Moengotapoe
- Founded: 1 January 1992; 34 years ago
- Ground: Ronnie Brunswijkstadion; Moengo, Suriname
- Capacity: 5,000
- Owner: Ronnie Brunswijk
- Manager: Josef Joekoe
- League: Suriname Major League
- 2025: SML, Regular season: 6th Playoffs: Champions
- Website: inter-moengotapoe.net
Home colours	Away colours

Inter Moengotapoe (sometimes rendered Inter Moengo Tapoe or just IMT) is a Surinamese football club, based in Moengo, Marowijne between Paramaribo and the border town of Albina. They play their home matches at the Ronnie Brunswijkstadion.

Since the launch of professional football on February 22, 2024, Inter Moengotapoe is competing in the professional Suriname Major League.

== History ==
IMT was champion of Suriname 10 times, winning every year between 2006-07 and 2018–19 except for 2007–08, 2011–12 and 2017-18.

IMT has participated in the CFU Club Championship nine times, most recently in 2017 when they were eliminated in the first round, finishing runners-up in their group. The club kit manufacturer is Jako.

The club made international headlines in September 2021, when Surinamese Vice President, and club owner, then 60-year old, Ronnie Brunswijk, inserted himself into a 2021 CONCACAF League match against Honduran outfit, Olimpia, playing 54 minutes. Olimpia won the match 6–0. Following the match, video leaked online that showed Brunswijk paying Olimpia players after the match, which raised suspicious that Brunswijk engaged in match fixing. On 22 September 2021, CONCACAF launched a formal investigation, and on 25 September 2021 both Inter Moengotapoe and Olimpia were disqualified from the tournament, with Brunswijk being banned from playing in CONCACAF competitions for three years.

== Honours ==
=== Domestic ===
- Suriname Major League/SVB Topklasse/Hoofdklasse/Topklasse
  - Champions (11): 2006–07, 2009–10, 2010–11, 2012–13, 2013–14, 2014–15, 2015–16, 2016–17, 2018–19, 2025
- Surinamese Cup
  - Winners (3): 2011–12, 2016–17, 2018–19
- Suriname President's Cup
  - Winners (6): 2007, 2010, 2011, 2012, 2013, 2017

=== Continental ===
- Caribbean Club Shield
  - Runners-up (2): 2018, 2022
- Caribbean Club Championship
  - Runners-up (1): 2021

=== Other ===
- Guyana Cup
  - Winners (2): 2010, 2014

== Performance in CONCACAF competitions ==
- 2004 CFU Club Championship

Quarter-finals v. (Collectivity of Saint Martin) Juventus – 2:0, 1:1
Semi-finals v. (Jamaica) Harbour View – 4:6, 2:3

- 2007 CFU Club Championship

Group stage v. (Antigua and Barbuda) SAP – 3:3
Group stage v. (Jamaica) Harbour View – 2:1
Group stage v. Puerto Rico Islanders – 2:5

- 2009 CFU Club Championship

First Round v. (Netherlands Antilles) CSD Barber – 0:1, 3:1
Second Round v. (Trinidad and Tobago) San Juan Jabloteh – 1:3, 1:2

- 2011 CFU Club Championship

Preliminary Phase v. (Guyana) Milerock – 1:0, 1:2

- 2012 CFU Club Championship

First Round v. (Guyana) Alpha United – 1:0
First Round v. (Guyana) Milerock – 7:1
First Round v. (Curaçao) Hubentut Fortuna – 3:2
Second Round v. (Antigua and Barbuda) Antigua Barracuda – 0:3
Second Round v. (Trinidad and Tobago) W Connection – 0:6
Second Round v. (Haiti) Victory – 2:8

- 2014 CFU Club Championship

First Round v. (Jamaica) Waterhouse – 0:4
First Round v. (Trinidad and Tobago) Caledonia AIA – 2:2
First Round v. (Haiti) Mirebalais – 1:2

- 2015 CFU Club Championship

First Round v. (Guyana) Alpha United – 0:3
First Round v. (Trinidad and Tobago) Central – 0:2

- 2016 CFU Club Championship

First Round v. (Guadeloupe) CS Moulien – 3–2
First Round v. (Dominican Republic) Atlántico FC – 1–0
First Round v. (Trinidad and Tobago) W Connection – 1–3

- 2017 CFU Club Championship

First Round v. (Haiti) Racing des Gonaïves 2–2
First Round v. (Antigua and Barbuda) Hoppers 2–0
First Round v. (Saint Vincent and the Grenadines) Bequia United 4–1

- 2018 Caribbean Club Shield

Group Stage v. (Aruba) Nacional 5–0
Group Stage v. (Barbados) Weymouth Wales 5–0
Group Stage v. (Guadeloupe) USR 5–1
Semi Final v. (Aruba) Nacional 4–0
Final v. (Martinique) Club Franciscain 1–2

- 2021 Caribbean Club Championship

Group Stage v. (Sint Maarten) Flames United 12–0
Group Stage v. (Dominican Republic) O&M 1–1
Semi Final v. (Puerto Rico) Metropolitan 3–1
Final v. (Haiti) Cavaly 0–3

- 2021 CONCACAF League

Round of 16 v. (Honduras) Olimpia 0–6, DSQ.

- 2022 Caribbean Club Shield

Group Stage v. (Aruba) Nacional 5–2
Group Stage v. (Martinique) Golden Lion 4–3
Semi Final v. (Guadeloupe) Gosier 4–0
Final v. (Puerto Rico) Bayamon 1–2

== Players ==
=== Current squad ===
As of 22 September 2021

Note: Flags indicate national team as defined under FIFA eligibility rules; some limited exceptions apply. Players may hold more than one non-FIFA nationality.

No.	Pos.	Nation	Player
1	GK	SUR	Cherwin Doorson
2	DF	SUR	Anduelo Amoeferie
5	DF	SUR	Miquel Darson
6	DF	SUR	Giovanni Asabigie
7	FW	SUR	Donnegy Fer
8	DF	SUR	Ronaldo Kemble
9	DF	SUR	Giovanni Waal
10	FW	SUR	Damian Brunswijk
11	FW	SUR	Kareem Kwasie
12	MF	SUR	Jerrel Wijks

No.	Pos.	Nation	Player
14	MF	SUR	Sersinho Eduard
16	FW	SUR	Rievaldo Doorson
23	FW	SUR	Gilberto Cronie
24	MF	SUR	Romeo Kastiel
30	GK	SUR	Obrendo Huiswoud
60	DF	SUR	Urano Morris
61	MF	SUR	Ronnie Brunswijk (captain)
69	DF	SUR	Joel Baja
77	FW	SUR	Vitorino Pinas
99	DF	SUR	Naldo Kwasie
