= Professionalism in association football =

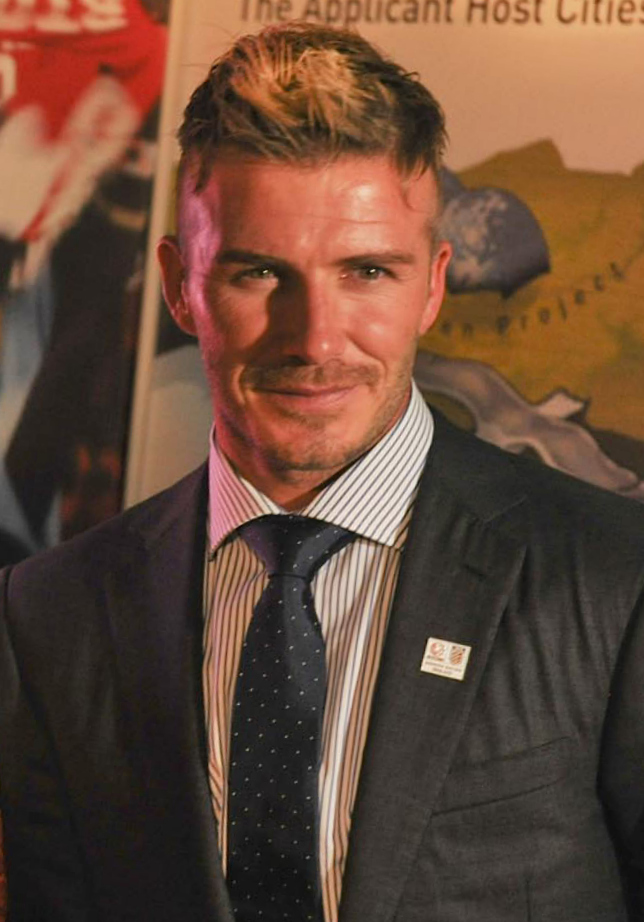
David Beckham, an English retired professional footballer with a net worth of US$300 million.

Association football is the world's most popular sport and is worth US$600 billion worldwide. By the end of the 20th century it was played by over 250 million players in over 200 countries. Around the world, the sport is played at a professional level by professional footballers, and millions of people regularly go to football stadiums to follow their favourite football teams, while billions more watch the sport on television or on the internet. Football has the highest global television audience in sport. The sport had amateur origins and evolved into the modern professional competition.

== History ==
Association football was first codified in 1863, with the formation of the Football Association (FA) in England. At this time the sport was played mainly by public schools, or teams with public school roots, and amateurism was the norm. This remained the case until the 1880s, when working-class teams began to vie for supremacy. Blackburn Olympic, a team composed mainly of factory workers, won the 1883 FA Cup Final. They were the first working-class team to win the competition since its inception in 1870. Though professionalism was not permitted, Olympic arranged jobs for their players, and supplemented their income with additional payments, a common occurrence among Lancashire clubs.

In 1880, a dispute began between the FA and Bolton Wanderers (founded in 1874), who had unofficially offered professional terms to Scottish players. Scottish players who played in England professionally were known as the Scotch Professors. The subject remained a heated one through the 1880s, directly or indirectly involving many other clubs besides Bolton. Their neighbours, Blackburn Rovers (founded in 1875) and Darwen (founded in 1870) had also signed Scottish players on a 'shamateur' basis using side jobs, either real or fabricated, to facilitate payment. The FA espoused the ideal of amateurism promoted by the likes of Corinthian F.C. from whom the phrase "Corinthian Spirit" came into being.

The differences between the amateur idealists from southern England and the increasingly professionalised teams from northern industrial towns came to a head in 1884. After Preston North End won an FA Cup match against Upton Park, the Londoners protested, seeking the result to be overturned due to the presence of paid players in the Preston ranks. This sparked a series of events which threatened to split the FA. Preston withdrew from the competition, and fellow Lancashire clubs Burnley and Great Lever followed suit. The protest gathered momentum to the point where more than 30 clubs, predominantly from the north, announced that they would set up a rival British Football Association if the FA did not permit professionalism. 18 months later the FA relented, and in July 1885 professionalism was formally legalised in England.

Though English clubs employed professionals, the Scottish Football Association continued to forbid the practice, withdrawing their clubs from the FA Cup in protest against the development, temporarily in 1885 then permanently in 1887. Consequently, many Scottish players migrated southward (although it also meant they were forbidden from playing for the Scotland national team). At first the FA put residential restrictions in place to prevent this trend, but these were abandoned by 1889. In the inaugural season of the Football League (1888–89), champions Preston North End fielded ten Scottish professionals.

One of the teams to benefit from the move of Scottish players to England was Sunderland, located close to the border. The club went professional in 1885, and the club recruited a number of Scotsmen the same year, their first internationally capped players. Founder James Allan left Sunderland in 1888 because of his dislike for the "professionalism" that had been creeping into the club, and subsequently formed Sunderland Albion. The wealthy mine owner Samuel Tyzack funded the professional advancement of the club, often pretending to be a priest while scouting for players in Scotland, as Sunderland's recruitment policy enraged many Scottish fans who supported the amateur ethos. In fact, the entire Sunderland lineup in the 1895 World Championship was made up of Scottish players. On 5 April 1890, the Football League's founder, William McGregor, labelled Sunderland as "the team of all talents" stating that they had "a talented man in every position".

Preston North End, the first English team to win the Championship and Cup "double" in 1889, did so with a majority of their team being made up of Scottish players. In the first season, they went undefeated both in the league and the FA Cup, which led to them being known as "the Invincibles".

The Scottish Football League launched on an amateur basis in 1890 but the nation's most famous club and founders of both the passing and international game, Queen's Park, initially refused to participate as they predicted that professionalism would follow. This suspicion proved correct, with bans issued to clubs for making payments or playing against others who had, and clear indicators that the likes of newly-formed Celtic's accumulation of some of the best talent in the country involved unofficial financial incentives. Faced with this, the Scottish FA lifted its ban on professionalism in 1893, whereupon 560 players were registered as professionals; however, despite the distinction of status between the home players and the England-based players having been removed, it was another three years before the SFA allowed 'Anglos' to play for the national team, prompted by poor results in the British Home Championship. Queen's Park remained outside the league until 1900, and remained committed to the amateur principles even after entering into competition with professional clubs. They never claimed another major trophy, but remained an amateur club until January 2020.

In the Soviet Union and the Communist bloc, athletes were presented as amateurs, even if they were de facto professional. Football clubs were no exception, and they were mostly linked to trade unions or government offices, with players being written down as workers of those particular industries. With the collapse of the Soviet Union, clubs and players officially gained professional status.

By 2023, the top 3 highest-paid football players in the world (Neymar Jr. from Al Hilal who was earning £240 million per year; Cristiano Ronaldo from Al Nassr who was earning £173 million per year; and Karim Benzema from Al-Ittihad who was earning £172 million per year) were all playing in the Saudi Pro League earning record-breaking salaries.

== Timeline by country ==
This table details the year in which professionalism was introduced, country by country.

Country	Year	Notes
England	1885	Football League, the very first professional league, formed in 1888.
Scotland	1893	
United States	1894	The American League of Professional Football was created by team owners from baseball's National League to compete during professional baseball's off-season. It lasted only one season.
Austria	1924	First fully professional league in continental Europe.
Czechoslovakia	1925	
Hungary	1926	
Italy	1926	it:Carta di Viareggio
Spain	1926	
Mexico	1927	Year when the national team turned professional. Mexico's first professional league was formed in 1943.
Argentina	1931	
Chile	1931	
France	1932	
Uruguay	1932	
Brazil	1933	São Paulo and Rio de Janeiro state leagues.
Turkey	1952	
Netherlands	1954	
Portugal	1960	Before the decree-law Lei n.º 2104, de 30 de maio de 1960, and formal professionalization in the sport, players of Portuguese top division clubs already earned prize money and bonus, and even received job offers arranged by the football club in order to earn a salary aside from football since the sport lacked a legal framework regarding remuneration of players.
West Germany	1963	Main article: Introduction of the Bundesliga
Sweden	1967	
Hong Kong	1968	First location in Asia to legalize professional football
Belgium	1974	Start of the "Liga Beroepsvoetbal" (self-uniting organisation of Belgian teams proceeding with full-time professional football).
Denmark	1978	
Egypt	1990	
Norway	1991	
Japan	1993	The J. League was established in 1991, and played its inaugural season in 1993.
India	1996	National Football League, the first professional league, formed in 1996.
Saudi Arabia	2007	
Philippines	2017	The Philippines Football League is the first professional league in the country.

See also Professional sports#Association football

== See also ==
- List of most expensive association football transfers
