= Moengo =

Moengo Mongo (Eastern Maroon Creole)
- Resort
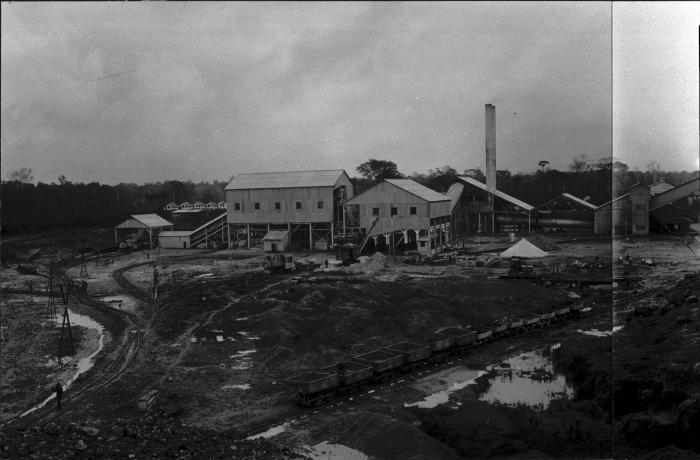
- Bauxite factory

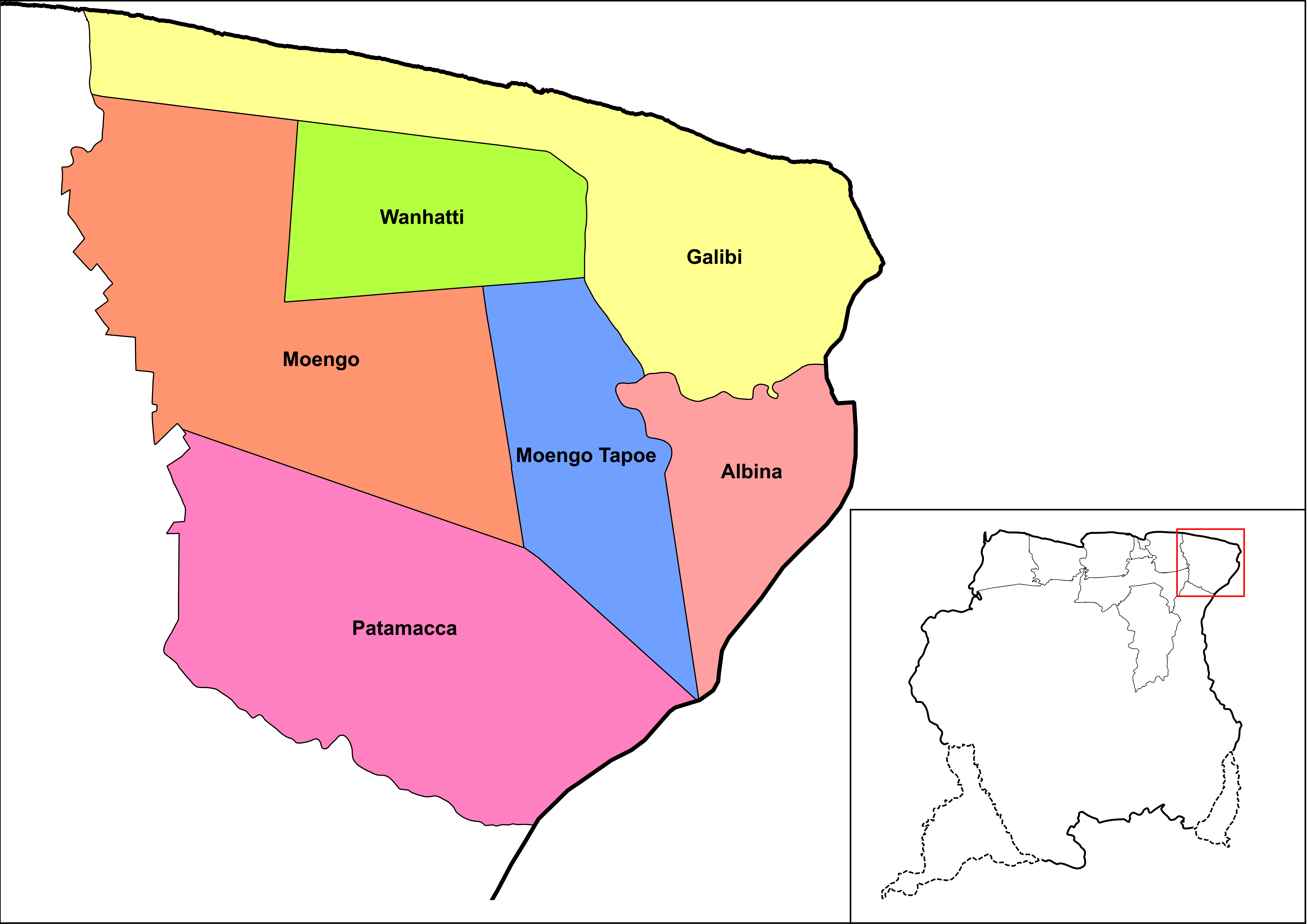
- Resorts of Marowijne District. Moengo
- Coordinates: 5°37′N 54°24′W
- Country: Suriname
- District: Marowijne District

Area
  - Total: 1,117 km^{2} (431 sq mi)
- Elevation: 25 m (82 ft)

Population (2012)
  - Total: 10,834
  - Density: 9.699/km^{2} (25.12/sq mi)
- Time zone: UTC-3 (AST)

Moengo (Dutch: [ˈmuŋɡoː]; Eastern Maroon Creole: Mongo) is a town in Suriname, located in the Marowijne district, between Paramaribo and the border town Albina on the Cottica River. Moengo is also a resort (municipality) in the district of Marowijne. Moengo was the capital of Marowijne District between 1932 and 1945. The current capital is Albina.

== History ==
Moengo started as a Maroon village on top of a hill overlooking the Cottica River. The settlement was later abandoned due to the difficulty of building houses on the bauxite rich ground. In 1916, Alcoa founded the first bauxite mine in Suriname, and this marks the beginning of the current town. Moengo was designed in 1919 to house 4,000 people. It would become a major centre for the mining and storage of bauxite.

Moengo was a segregated town. The American Quarter was built for the Americans and Dutch, the Surinamese Quarter for the Afro-Surinamese, and Wonoredjo for the Javanese Surinamese. Maroons were only hired for temporary work or trade in the town, and had to leave by sundown. Until the 1960s, the racial regulations remained in force. In 2012, the Maroons formed the biggest ethnic group with a significant minority of Javanese.

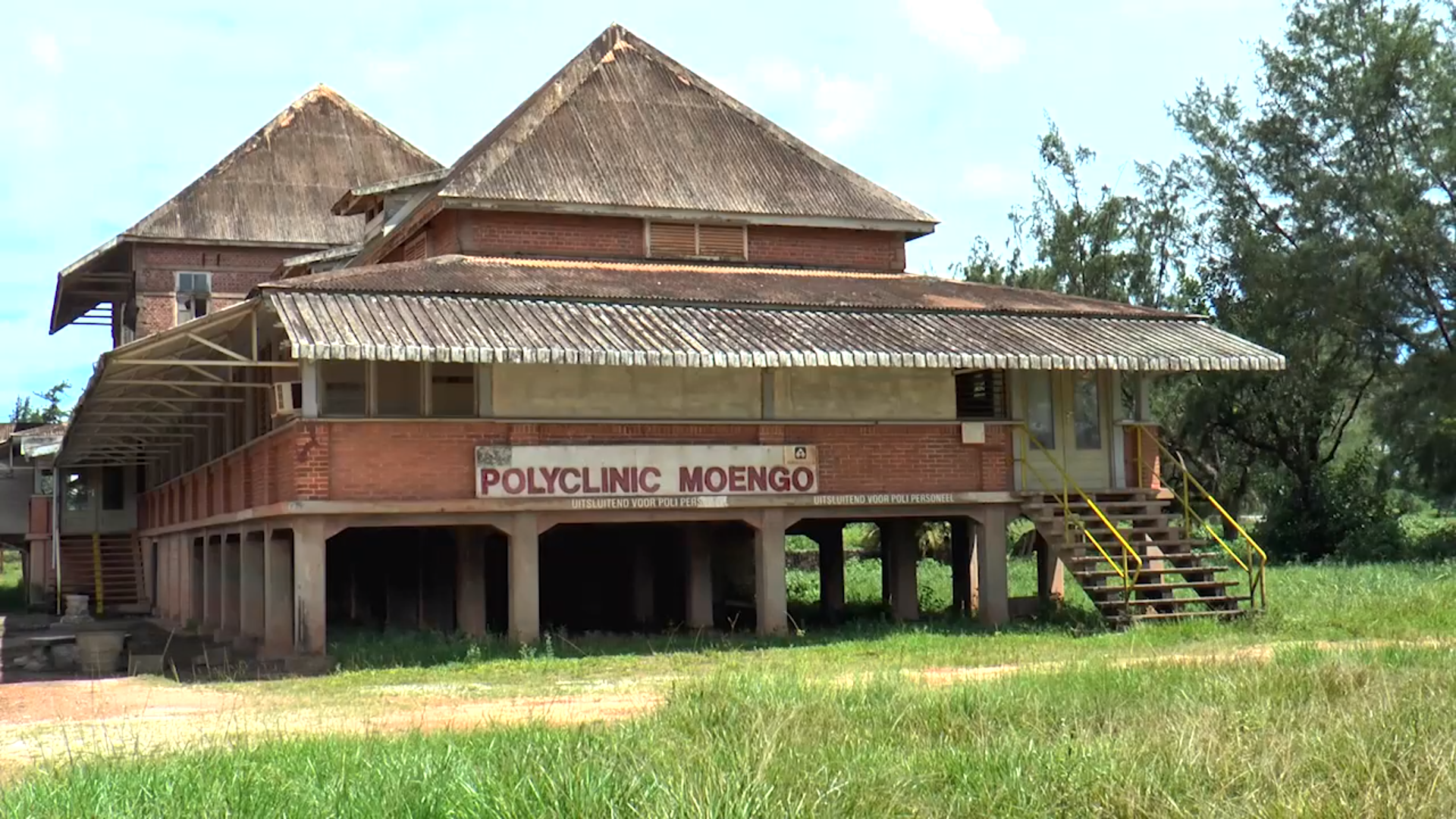
Health centre at Moengo

The 1980s marked a violent period: the Surinamese Interior War had reached Moengo. Troops from the Jungle Commando captured the town in 1988, and held it for nine months before being recaptured by the National Army in June 1989. A large portion of the population fled the town, the bauxite mine ceased its operations, and several buildings burned down.

Moengo ceased to be mainly dependent on mining in the late 20th century. In June 2014, Alcoa announced that the bauxite mine was almost depleted, and wanted to cease operations in Suriname. In 2017, the ownership of Suralco, the local subsidiary, was transferred to the Government of Suriname.

== Transport ==
Moengo could originally only be reached via the river. In 1926 lieutenant Weyne started to build a road to Moengotapoe which was extended to Paramaribo in 1929. In 1964, the East-West Link opened.

The Moengo Airstrip is located near the town, and was founded in 1955. Originally the airport was called Schiphol after Amsterdam Airport Schiphol.

The Port of Moengo is a medium sized port with UN/LOCODE SRMOJ. It used to be privately owned by Alcoa. In 2008, it was sold to Traymore Docks. It has two jetties of which one is capable of handling oil tankers. Ocean-going ships have to use river tugboats.

== Sports and arts ==
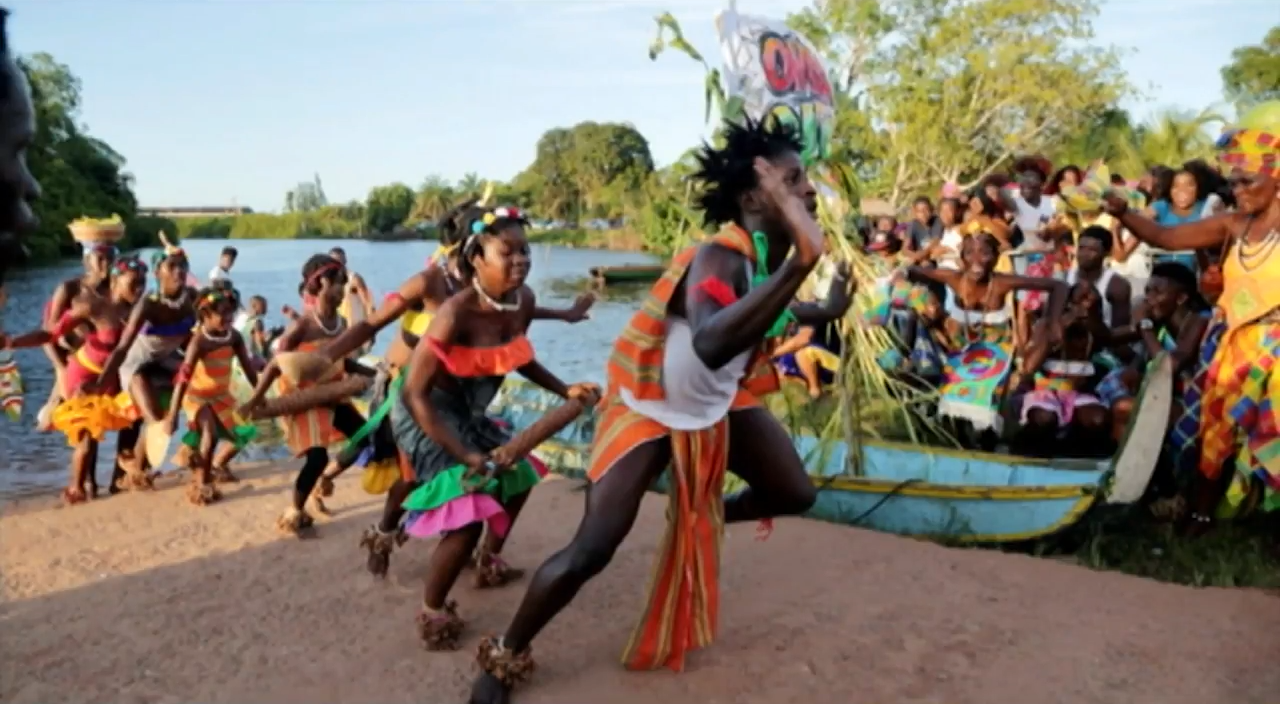
Moengo Festival 2017

The town is home to two Suriname first division football clubs: Inter Moengotapoe who play at Ronnie Brunswijkstadion, and Notch who play at Moengo Stadion.

In 2009, Kibii Foundation, chaired by the artist Marcel Pinas, established the Tembe Art Studio with the aim of inviting international artists to teach their skills. These artists-in-residence have to donate a work of art to the Marowijne Art Park located in the nearby village of Ovia Olo. As of 2011, Moengo is home to the Contemporary Art Museum Moengo which is the first museum for contemporary art in Suriname. As of 2013, the Moengo Festival is organised, a three-day festival alternately showcasing music, theatre, dance, and the visual arts. In 2018, the festival attracted 20,000 people.

== Villages ==
- Ricanau Mofo

== Notable people ==
- Tommy Asinga (1968), athlete.
- George Barron (1949-2017), sculptor.
- Gerrit Barron (1951), children's book author.
- Marinus Bee (~1971), politician, Chairman of the National Assembly of Suriname.
- Boni (c. 1730–1793), freedom fighter and guerrilla leader
- Humphrey Campbell (1958-2024), singer and record producer.
- Kenneth Kluivert (1941), football player.
- Joël Martinus a.k.a. Mony Hond Bordo (~1981), politician and convicted drug dealer.
- Humphrey Mijnals (1930-2019), football player.
- Max Nijman (1941-2016), singer.

== Bibliography ==
- Koning, Anouk de (2011). "Shadows of the Plantation? A Social History of Suriname's Bauxite Town Moengo". New West Indian Guide / Nieuwe West-Indische Gids. 85 (3–4). Leiden: Brill: 215–246. doi:10.1163/13822373-90002430. hdl:2066/160695.
