= S.V. Notch =

Surinamese football club

Notch
- Full name: Sporting Vereniging Notch Moengo
- Nickname: Notch
- Founded: 11 February 2003; 22 years ago
- Ground: Moengo Stadion; Moengo
- Capacity: 2,000
- Owner: Joël Martinus
- Manager: Rafael Everton
- League: Suriname Major League
- 2024: SML, Regular season: 5th Playoffs: Did not qualify
Home colours	Away colours

Sporting Vereniging Notch is a Surinamese football club based in Moengo, Marowijne.

Since the launch of professional football on February 22, 2024, S.V. Notch is competing in the professional Suriname Major League.

== Notable coaches ==
- (Suriname) Joël Martinus
- (Suriname) Roy Vanenburg
- (Brazil) João Duarte Andrade
- (Brazil) Rafael Everton

== Honours ==
- SVB Tweede Divisie: 1

2010–11

- Beker van Suriname: 1

2011

== Performance in CONCACAF competitions ==
- 2014 CFU Club Championship

Withdrew

- 2016 CFU Club Championship

First round v. (Dominican Republic) Atlético Pantoja – 0:3
First round v. (Jamaica) Arnett Gardens – 4:8
First round v. (Haiti) America des Cayes – 0:1
