= S.V. Voorwaarts =

Surinamese football club

Voorwaarts
- Full name: Sport Vereniging Voorwaarts
- Founded: 1 August 1919; 107 years ago
- Ground: Voorwaartsveld
- Capacity: 1,500
- Manager: Werner Blackson
- League: Suriname Major League
- 2024: SML, Regular season: 3rd Playoffs: Semi-finals
Home colours	Away colours

Sport Vereniging Voorwaarts is an association football club from Paramaribo, Suriname.

Since the launch of professional football on February 22, 2024, S.V. Voorwaarts is competing in the professional Suriname Major League.

== History ==
=== Foundation ===
Founded on August 1, 1919 by a group of school kids, primarily from the Hendrikschool, who had decided that they wanted to continue to play organized football in the club associations, following the completion of their studies. The club was founded at the parents' house of 13 year old club member Bob Verhoeven in Fort Zeelandia. Other members who were present at the club's foundation were former players Max Enuma, William Read, Daisy A. Samson, George Meyer, Henny van Eyck, A. Eddie Zaal and Eddy van Hoek. The first chairman of the club was Jean Heilbron, and his vice-president was Henny van Eyck.

On 16 November 1919 Voorwaarts played their first official match against the second team of RKVV Olympia which ended in a 4–0 loss. The first starting lineup of Voorwaarts included the following players Otmar May (keeper), George Meyer, Eli Polak (backs), Jagessar, Leo Lashley, Sem Salomons (midfield), Daisy Samson, Slaterus, William Read, Henny van Eyck en Jacques Samuels (attack). Voorwaarts is the only club in Suriname which was founded prior to the establishment of the Surinamese Football Association in 1920, that still compete at the top flight.

Voorwaarts are the first Surinamese football club to have traveled abroad. In April 1927 the team made a trip to Saint-Laurent-du-Maroni, French Guiana winning the match 8–0 before returning home. The players who played for Voorwaarts in this match were Harry Nassy, John Monkou, Jean Heilbron, Frank Oliveira, John Leps, Louis Monkou, Gerrit Brakke, Max Lashley, Eddie da Costa, Riek Anijs en Hans Nahar. The trip was made by motorboat to Moengo, and then continued by bicycle along the Weyneweg.

=== Early years ===
Prior to World War II, Voorwaarts fielded some of the best players in the country. Some of those notable players from pre-War include Harry Nassy, Eddy Douglas, John Monkou, Emile Monkou, Wim Anijs, Riek Anijs, Eugéne Leckie, René Leckie, Nol Gomperts, Jacques Brakke, Mathaës Brakke, Just Gouvernante, Bakker de Vries and Hans Nahar.

In 1938, there was a serious crisis among the players of the club and the board felt it advisable to proceed to dissolve the association. In 1940, shortly before World War II crossed some old Voorwaarts players, such as Eddy Douglas, Frits Judah and Sik Heymans, put their heads together and the structure of the club was successfully reorganized. Voorwaarts first participation in the SVB Hoofdklasse was a successful one, with the club winning the National championship its first season. The glory would be short lived as the War broke out shortly thereafter, bringing a halt to all competition in the country.

=== Renaissance ===
After the War ended, Voorwaarts talent scout Frits Juda immediately went to work, putting a team together with the likes of Henar, Leo Rack, Curie Sam Sie, H. Ho A Hing, Guno Hoen, Bakboord and Holband. Voorwaarts became a major club in the formidable years of the sport in Suriname. In 1988 the team relegated to the SVB Eerste Klasse. The club managed to secure 5 National championships prior to relegation, winning titles in 1936, 1941, 1952, 1957 and 1977. The championship team of 1952 was made up of Wijks, L. Mans, G. Hoen, U. Samsey, A. Degenaar, L. Kogeldans, G. Degenaar, R. Ghuicheriet, Esser, C. Graanoogst and Gill.H

=== 1978: First trip to Europe ===
Voorwaarts were not the first Surinamese football team to travel to Europe. Both Transvaal and Robinhood had made the trip before. In 1978 Voorwaarts travelled to the Netherlands to play a series of matches against Dutch Eredivisie clubs Telstar, N.E.C., FC Amsterdam, HFC Haarlem and FC Den Haag. The team set camp in Leiden at the Morspoort-kazerne. Voorwaarts were less successful than Transvaal and Robinhood before them, failing to secure a win, and suffering a record 12–0 defeat to N.E.C.

==== Tour results ====
13 August 1978	Telstar (Netherlands)	1–0	(Suriname) Voorwaarts	Schoonenberg Stadion, Velsen
		Report

15 August 1978	N.E.C. (Netherlands)	12–0	(Suriname) Voorwaarts	Stadion de Goffert, Nijmegen
		Report

18 August 1978	FC Amsterdam (Netherlands)	4–2	(Suriname) Voorwaarts	Olympic Stadium, Amsterdam
		Report

20 August 1978	HFC Haarlem (Netherlands)	4–0	(Suriname) Voorwaarts	Haarlem Stadion, Haarlem
		Report

23 August 1978	FC Den Haag (Netherlands)	5–0	(Suriname) Voorwaarts	Zuiderpark Stadion, The Hague
		Report

== Notable coaches ==
- (Suriname) Kenneth Jaliens (2009–2011)
- (Netherlands) Ruiz Kromorejo (2011–?)
- (Suriname) Kenneth Jaliens (?–2019)

== Team records ==
- Record for largest win Internationally for a Surinamese club : 12–0, vs. Christiansburg (Guyana), 7 July 1976
- Record for largest win Nationally for a Surinamese club : 18–0, vs. Bintang Merah, 26 June 1955
- Record for largest defeat Internationally for a Surinamese club : 12–0, vs. N.E.C. (Netherlands), 15 August 1978
- Record for largest defeat Nationally for a Surinamese club : 9–1, vs. P.V.V., 6 November 1952^{1}

1. Record stood until 26 June 1955 when Voorwaarts defeated Bintang Merah

== Achievements ==
- SVB Hoofdklasse: 6

1936, 1941, 1952, 1957, 1977, 2002

- Suriname President's Cup: 1

2002

- Dragtenbeker: 2

1930, 1931

- Emancipatiebeker: 4

1930, 1932, 1934, 1935

- Royal Cup: 1

2007

== Current squad ==
2022 Squads Note: Flags indicate national team as defined under FIFA eligibility rules; some limited exceptions apply. Players may hold more than one non-FIFA nationality.

No.	Pos.	Nation	Player
1	GK	SUR	Orfeo Vijhoven
2	DF	SUR	Pearnell Linga
3	DF	SUR	Tariq Haakmat
4	DF	SUR	Giorgio Bhoi
5	DF	SUR	Lorenzo Donner
6	MF	SUR	Virgil Alamakee
7	FW	SUR	Ulrich Overman
8	MF	SUR	Alvaro Gemerts
9	FW	SUR	Shorano Mawie
10	MF	SUR	Jual Pengel

No.	Pos.	Nation	Player
11	FW	SUR	Rai Pinas
12	MF	SUR	Toshiro Homoet
13	DF	SUR	Cedric Norah
14	MF	SUR	Magill Homoet
15	FW	SUR	Valerio Weewee
16	DF	SUR	Givanno Elskamp
17	MF	SUR	Urbian Rozenblad
22	GK	SUR	Nikhil Khargoe
27	GK	SUR	Firgillio Lamsberg
32	FW	SUR	Miguillo Deul

== Performance in CONCACAF competitions ==
- 1976 CONCACAF Champions' Cup

First Round v. (Guyana) Christianburg – 8:1, 12:0
Second Round v. (Trinidad and Tobago) Tesoro Palo Seco – 4:0, 2:1
Third Round v. (Suriname) Robinhood – 0:3, 0:0

- 1977 CONCACAF Champions' Cup

First Round v. (Guyana) Pele FC 0:2, 1:4
Second Round v. (Suriname) Robinhood 0:1, 0:1

- 1978 CONCACAF Champions' Cup

First Round v. (Trinidad and Tobago) TECSA – 2:1, 1:1
Second Round v. (Guyana) Pele FC 5:1, 0:1
Third Round v. (Trinidad and Tobago) Defence Force – 1:2, 0:2
