= Dr. Ir. Franklin Essed Stadion =

Sports venue in Paramaribo, Suriname

Dr. Ir. F. Essed Stadion
- Frank Essed Stadion
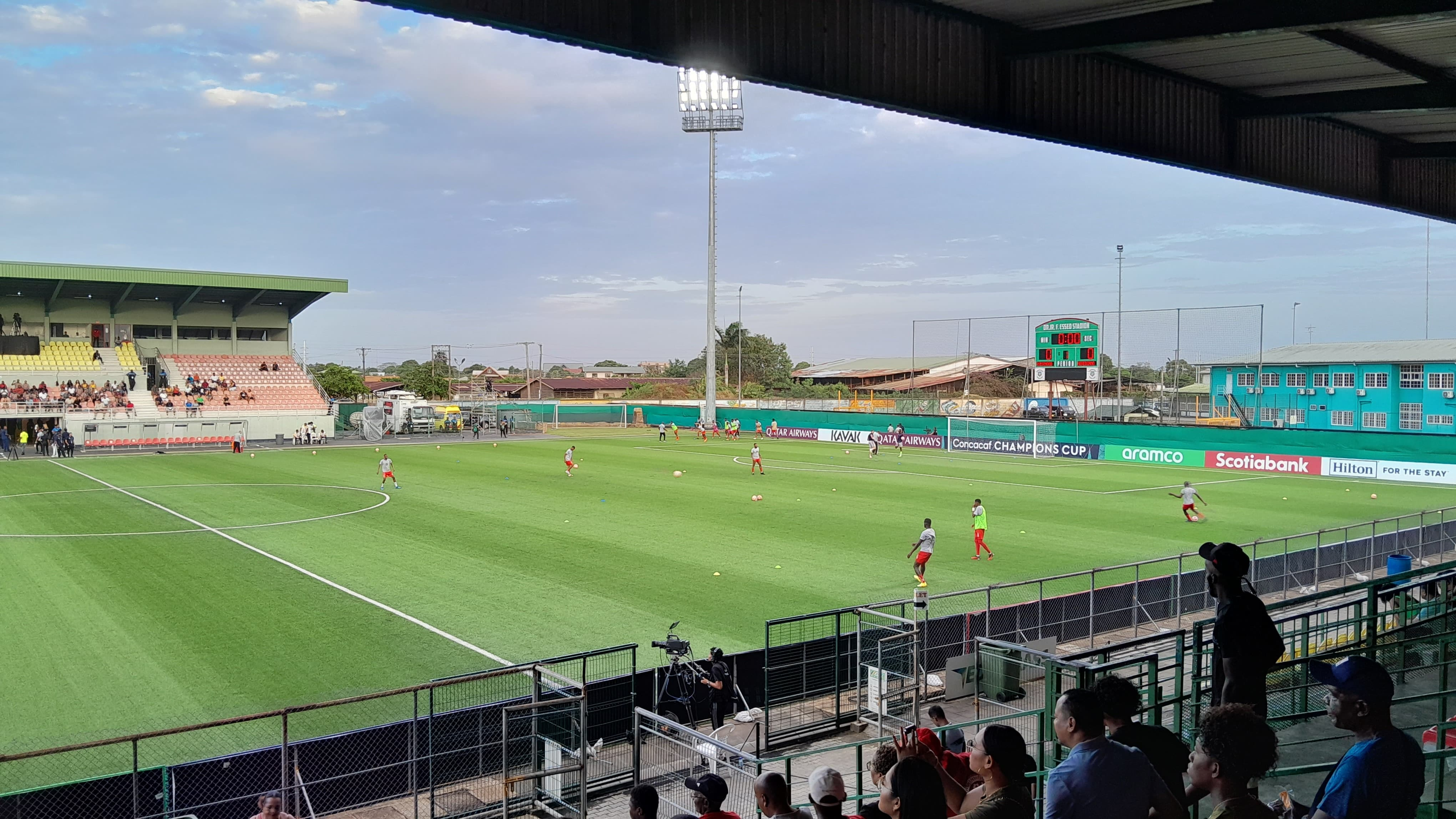
- Interactive map of Dr. Ir. F. Essed Stadion
- Former names: Flora Stadion
- Location: Paramaribo, Suriname
- Coordinates: 5°48′41.31″N 55°12′26.31″W
- Owner: City and District of Paramaribo
- Operator: Surinaamse Voetbal Bond
- Capacity: 3,150
- Surface: Artificial turf

Construction
- Opened: 24 December 1958

Tenants
- S.V. Leo Victor; Sportvereniging Nationaal Leger; S.V. Robinhood; Suriname national football team

Dr. Ir. Franklin Essed Stadion, formerly known as the Flora Stadion and commonly called the Frank Essed Stadion, is a multi-purpose stadium in Paramaribo, Suriname. It is home to Leo Victor Cosmos, Royal '95, and Super Red Eagles. It is also the home stadium of SNL, the football club of the national military of Suriname. The stadium was named after Surinamese politician and forestry scientist Frank Essed. The stadium were created by the government of Suriname for national and international matches.

== Location ==
The Frank Essed Stadium is located in Southwestern part of Paramaribo, in the Flora neighborhood. It is next door to the National Indoor Stadium on the west end of the Jaggernath Lachmonstraat.

=== Concerts ===
The Essed Stadium has been used as a location for several concerts.

| Date | Band | Tour Name | Attendance |
|---|---|---|---|
| 25 August 2007 | Kassav' | Kassav' Carnaval Tour | - |
| 15 August 2009 | Gentleman | Another Intensity Tour | - |
| 3 September 2011 | Atif Aslam | Impact Tour | - |

== Renovation ==
In May 2018 the Surinamese FA signed a contract with construction company Structure Technics NV for the renovation of the stadium. Essed stadium must serve as a backup for international matches if the André Kamperveen stadium fails to maintain FIFA and CONCACAF stadium standards. The renovation costs are estimated at USD 1,048,000 and was funded by FIFA.

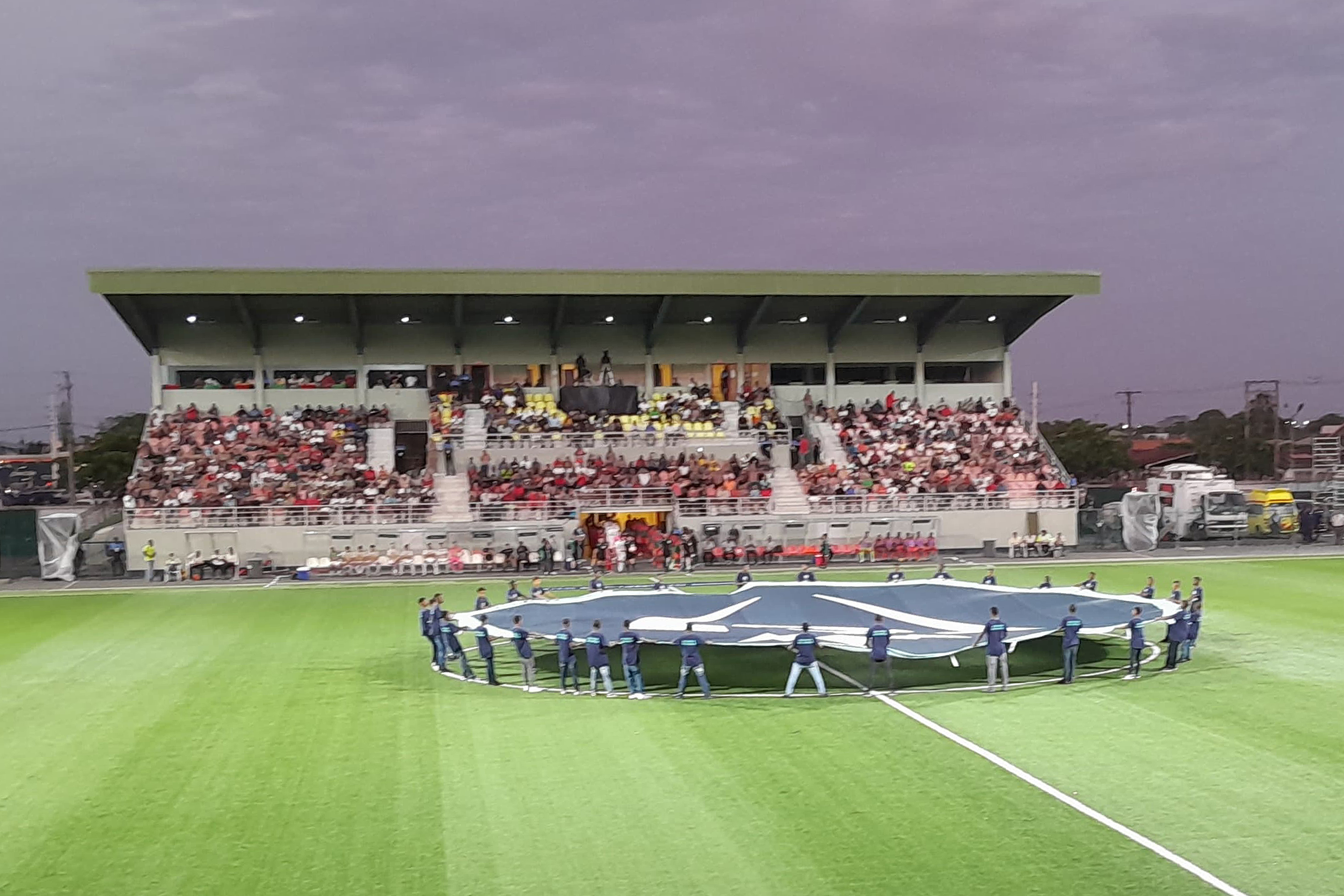
new stand of the Essed Stadion
