= S.V. Leo Victor =

Surinamese football club

SV Leo Victor
- Full name: Sport Vereniging Leo Victor
- Founded: 9 January 1934; 92 years ago
- Ground: Dr. Ir. Franklin Essed Stadion, Paramaribo, Suriname
- Capacity: 3,500
- Manager: Rogillio Kolf
- League: Eerste Divisie
- 2025: SML, Regular season: 7th Playoffs: Did not qualify
Home colours	Away colours	Third colours

Sport Vereniging Leo Victor, known as SV Leo Victor, is a Surinamese football club which plays in the Eerste Divisie. They play their home games in Paramaribo at the Dr. Ir. Franklin Essed Stadion.

== History ==
Founded on 9 January 1934 as a Roman Catholic sports club, S.V. Leo Victor were founded by the working community of the Leo Victor cigar factory in Paramaribo, Suriname. In 1964, Leo Victor became the first association football club of Suriname to qualify for an International CONCACAF club tournament, qualifying for the CONCACAF Champions' Cup. Leo Victor made four appearances in the tournament. The first series was against Maple Club F.C. from Trinidad and Tobago, with Leo Victor winning 5–4 on aggregate score, and the second series against Aigle Noir AC from Haiti, which Leo Victor won 3–2 on aggregate score, before the tournament was canceled for reasons unknown. The 1963 team was made up of the following players Henk Schotsborg, Ewald van Bosse, Edmund Wong Swie Sang, André Fernandes, Arnold Sanches, Etiré Strok (captain), Rudi de Randamie, Edmund Griffith, Rudolf Marcet, Emile Esajas, Cyrill Mossel and the substitutes were Henry Enig for Strok and Rudie Schutte for De Randamie.

SV Leo Victor have won the national championship five times, in 1961, 1963–64, 1978, 1982–83 and the 1992–93 season. The 1978 selection consisted of the following players: Ro Bottse (captain), goalkeeper Saliek, Ramon Burgzorg, Kenneth Borgia, Frank Borgia, Oliviera, Ronny Borgia, Valdink, Gerrit Waal, Willmans and Frits Purperhart (player/coach).

On 24 January 1986, Leo Victor reached their deepest point, by losing 2–0 to Santos FC they were relegated to the SVB Eerste Klasse, becoming the first SVB Hoofdklasse club to relegate and play at the Flora Stadion. The following season saw the club winning the Eerste Klasse title and promoting back to the top flight, winning the youth league championship in the same year.

== Achievements ==
- Surinamese League: 5

1961, 1963–64, 1978, 1982–83, 1992–93

- Beker van Suriname:

2003, 2014

- Suriname President's Cup:

2003, 2014

== Performance in CONCACAF competitions ==
- CONCACAF Champions' Cup: 5 appearances

1979 – Second Round (Caribbean) – Lost to Jong Colombia (Netherlands Antilles) 3–2 on agg (stage 3 of 7)
1983 – First Round (Caribbean) – Lost to SV Dakota (Netherlands Antilles) 5–4 on agg (stage 1 of 4)
1988 – First Round (Caribbean) – Lost to ASL Sport Guyanais (French Guiana) 3–2 on agg (stage 1 of ?)
1993 – First Round (Caribbean) – Lost to ASL Sport Guyanais (French Guiana) 3–1 on agg (stage 1 of 5)
1994 – Second Round (Caribbean) – Lost to Jong Colombia (Netherlands Antilles) 5–4 on pens (1–1 on agg) (stage 3 of 7)

- CFU Club Championship: 1 appearance

2007 – Quarter-finals – Lost to Puerto Rico Islanders (Puerto Rico) 7–1 (stage 2 of 4)

== List of coaches ==
- (Suriname) Rufus Belgrave
- (Suriname) Frits Purperhart (1978–96)
- (Suriname) Ronald Kolf (2003–08)
- (Suriname) Etienne Remak (2009–2019)
- (Suriname) Rogillio Kolf (2019–)
