= Bernharddorp =

- Village
- Location within Suriname
- Coordinates: 5.629444°N 55.213333°W
- Country: Suriname
- District: Para District
- Resort: Noord

Government
  - Captain: Lloyd Banda

Population (2022)
  - Total: 2,000
- Time zone: UTC-3 (AST)

Bernharddorp is an Indigenous village of Lokono and Kalina Amerindians in the resort of Noord in the Para District in Suriname.

== History ==
In the 1930s, Amerindians from the village of Bisri near Zanderij settled in the area which was owned by the Roman Catholic Diocese of Paramaribo at the time. In 1950, the village was visited by Prince Bernhard of Lippe-Biesterfeld, the consort of Queen Juliana of the Netherlands, to install the first elected village chief. On 25 February 1951, the village was named Bernharddorp, however Bernard officially refers to Bernard of Clairvaux.

Bernharddorp has a school, and in 1952, was given 214 hectares of communal land for agriculture. In 2018, the captain has asked from 8,000 hectares partially to be used for an economic development zone.

== Transport ==
The village is located on the Indira Gandhiweg which connects Paramaribo with the Johan Adolf Pengel International Airport via Lelydorp.
