= Domburg, Suriname =

Domburg Dumborgu (Sranan Tongo) Damborgu (Caribbean Hindustani) Damborgu (Caribbean Javanese)
- Resort
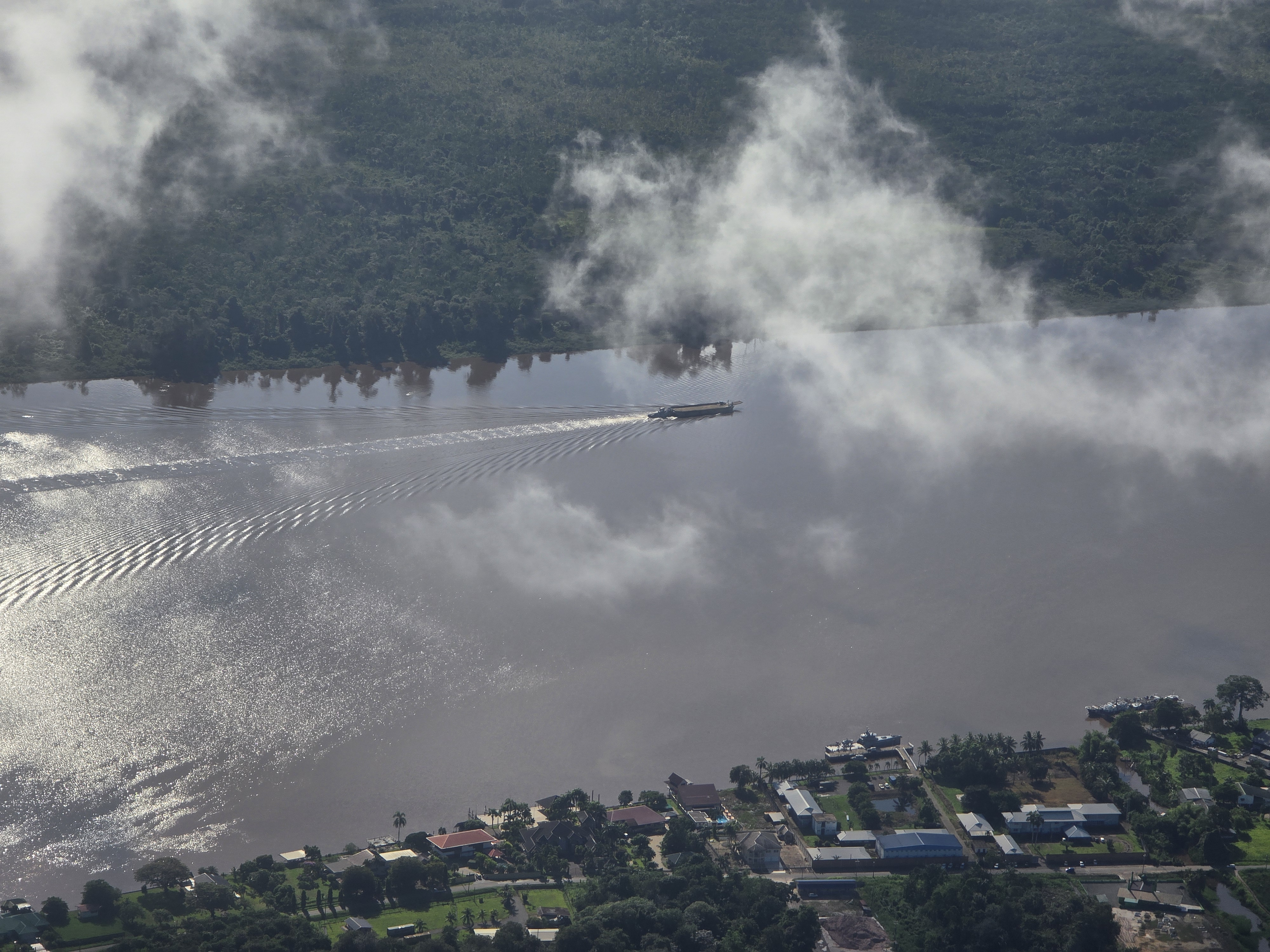
- Ship at Domburg, 2025

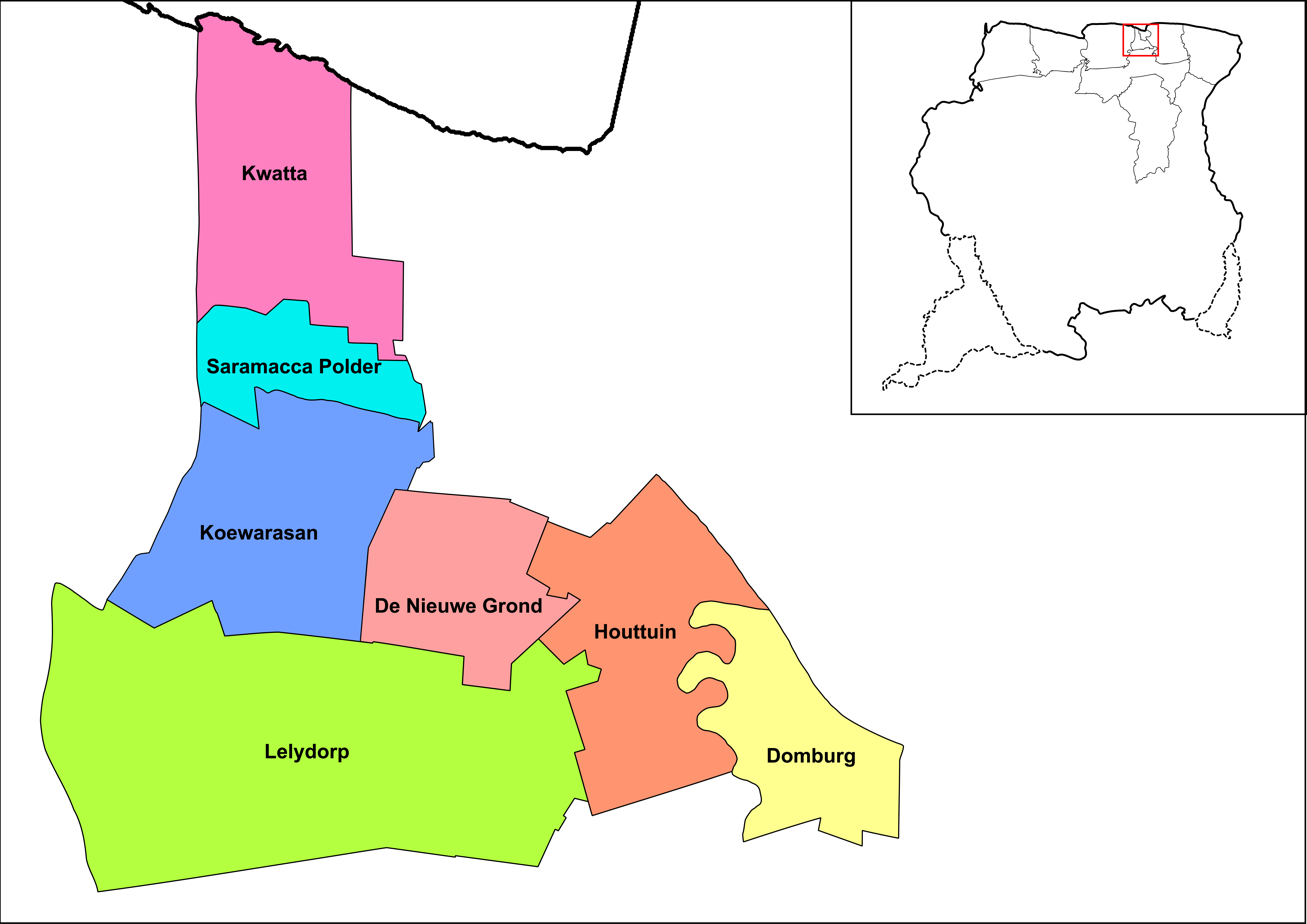
- Map showing the resorts of Wanica District. Domburg

- Location within Suriname
- Coordinates: 5°42′N 55°05′W
- Country: Suriname
- District: Wanica District

Area
  - Total: 37 km^{2} (14 sq mi)
- Elevation: 5 m (16 ft)

Population (2012)
  - Total: 5,661
  - Density: 150/km^{2} (400/sq mi)
- Time zone: UTC-3 (AST)

Domburg (Note: Sranan Tongo: Dumborgu, Caribbean Hindustani: Damborgu, Caribbean Javanese: Damborgu) is a resort in the Wanica District of Suriname, located on the northern coast of South America. Its population at the 2012 census was 5,661.

Domburg is located on the Suriname River, about 16 kilometers to the south of the capital of Paramaribo. It is bordered by the district Commewijne to the north and east, Para to the south and the resort Houttuin to the west. Near Domburg in Oost, an artificial white sand beach, White Beach, has been created along the Suriname River.

== History ==
Domburg was founded as a sugar plantation in 1737 by P. Thourron. In 1873 the local population started a program of independent agriculture which was encouraged by governor Van Sypesteyn who designated Nieuw Amsterdam and Domburg as suitable locations. Later Domburg became the seat of the Commissioner of the former District of Upper Suriname. In the 1930s a road was built connecting Domburg with Paramaribo which attracted industry to the area.

== Notable people ==
- Dési Bouterse (1945–2024), President of Suriname (2010–2020)
- Max Woiski Sr. (1911–1981), musician
