= Bethesda, Suriname =

Former leper colony in Suriname

Bethesda
- Former leper colony
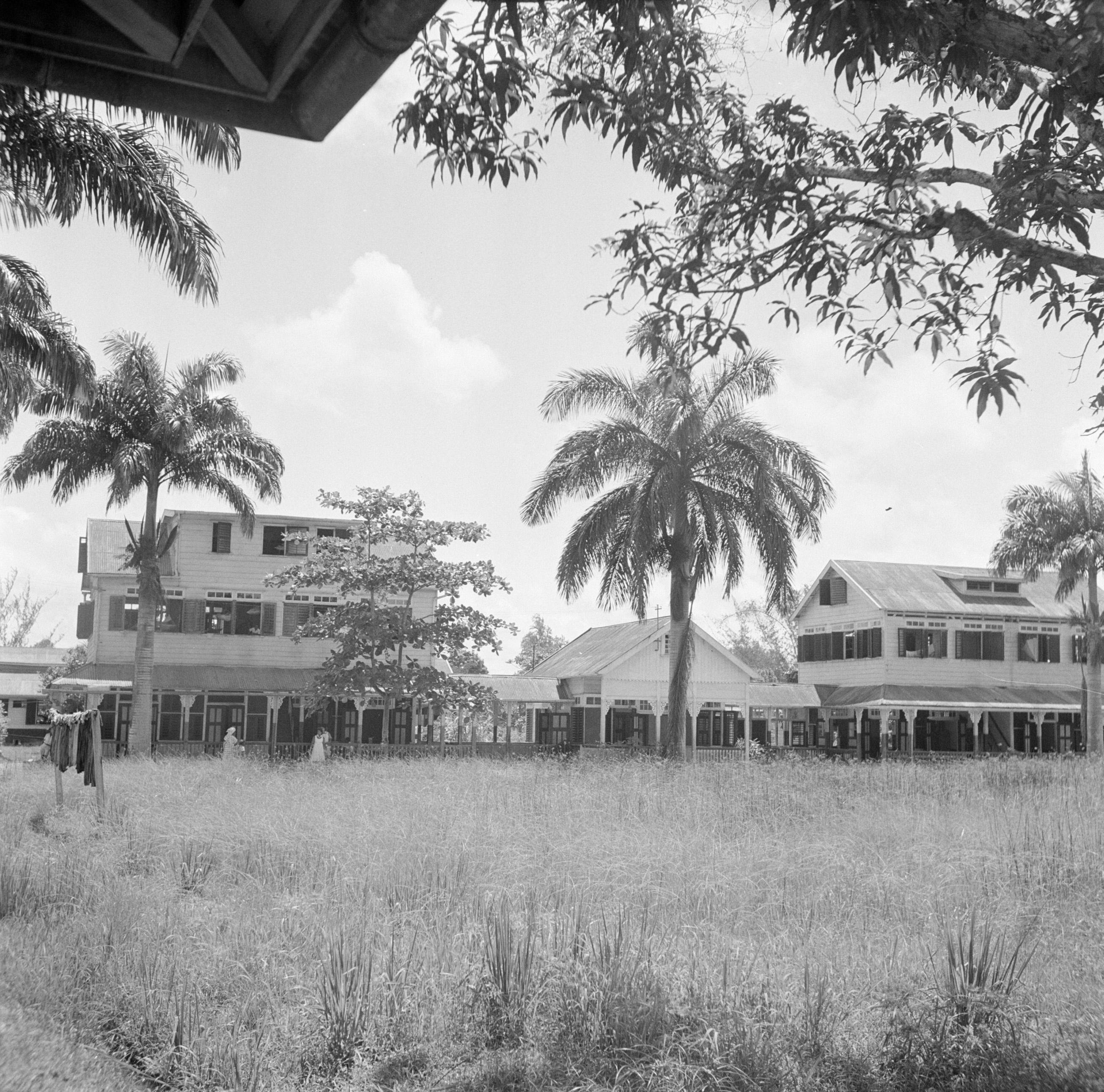
- Bethesda (1947)

- Location in Suriname
- Coordinates: 5.6122°N 55.0641°W
- Country: Suriname
- District: Para District
- Resort (municipality): Oost

Bethesda was a Moravian leper colony from 1899 until 1933 in the Dutch colony of Suriname (now Suriname). The name refers to the healing of the paralytic at Bethesda by Jesus. The colony was located near Paranam in the Oost resort on the Suriname River. It was originally located on the former sugar plantation Groot Chatillon, that already served as a leper colony of the Dutch colonial state. The Catholic leper colony Sint Gerardus Majella, founded in 1895 as successor of Batavia, was located nearby. In 1933 the Bethesda leper colony moved to Livorno, closer to the centre of Paramaribo, where it functioned as New Bethesda until 1964. Initially patient care at Bethesda was in the hands of German deaconesses. After the Second World War their leadership was taken over by the Dutch and the Surinamese.

== Overview ==
Bethesda was founded in 1899 as a small leprosy colony. In 1902, Henry Weiss left for the United States with some pictures of the colony taken by the German deaconess Martha Stern in order to raise funds. Weiss managed to visit US President Theodore Roosevelt. The mission was clearly successful, because the next set of photographs by Martha Stern display an US flag.

The colony treated between 50 and 60 patients in the period 1910–1921. Bethesda was a little agricultural village with several pavilions, and some residential houses in a park. The patients did not receive any wages, and were expected to work, if able. Bethesda was reluctant to take in patients from other leper colonies in Suriname. Nevertheless, in 1935 there were 6 Hindu and 3 Catholic patients at Bethesda, possibly under the condition of conversion to the Moravian denomination.

The care for the lepers was partially by a Dutch government subsidy of 250 Dutch guilders per year per patient, and partially financed by private donations from the US, Germany, and the Netherlands. On 25 October 1951, A.C.W. Lionarons, a doctor in Paramaribo, left his entire fortune to the Bethesda Foundation which as of 2002 was worth over a million euros.

In 1933, the Bethesda leper colony was moved, because of flooding, to Livorno, near the present harbour of Paramaribo, and renamed to Nieuw Bethesda. where it has remained in function until 1964. The number of patients in New Bethesda topped in 1949 with no less than 189 patients. It decreased from then on. In 1964 the last 4 remaining patients were transferred to Groot Chatillon. This state leper colony closed its doors in 1972, three years before the independence of Suriname.

== Present-day ==
The Bethesda Foundation is still active, and since 2007 has broadened its target audience to people with a severe handicap in Suriname, because the rate of leprosy has declined. Lepers are nowadays treated in the Academic Hospital Paramaribo.

== See also ==
- Batavia, Suriname
