= Santigron =

- town
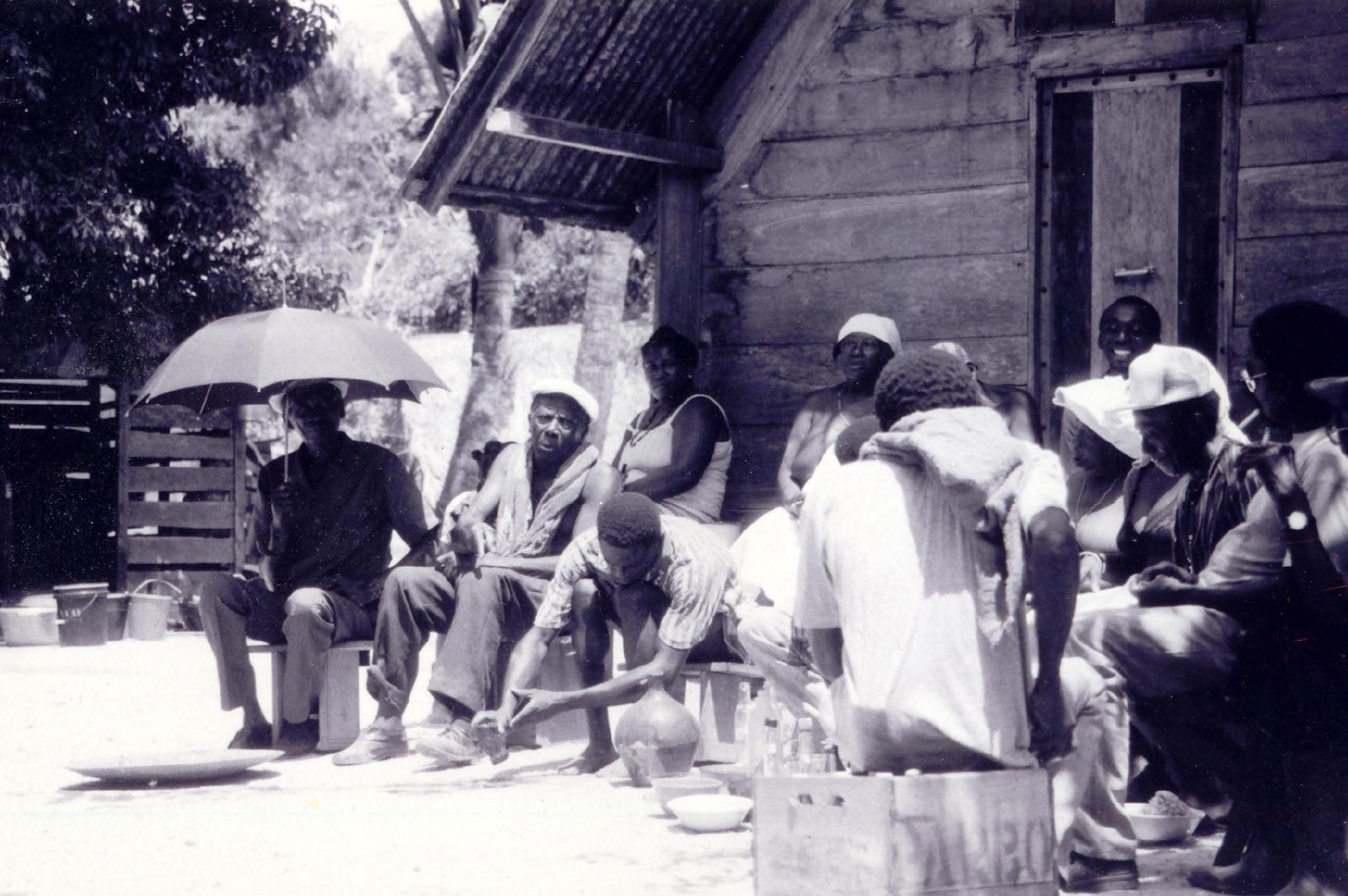
- Rum is poured out in an ancestor ritual

- Location within Suriname
- Coordinates: 5°40′38″N 55°20′25″W
- Country: Suriname
- District: Wanica District
- Resorts: Lelydorp

Population
  - Total: ~1,000
- Time zone: UTC-3 (AST)

Santigron is a Maroon village in Lelydorp, Suriname. The village of Santigron is along the Saramacca River not far from Paramaribo. It is one of Suriname's Maroon villages, where descendants of 18th-century runaway slaves live. Unlike in Brazil or Jamaica, some 20,000 Maroons are still living in Suriname 's rainforest and retain many aspects of their traditional Afro-American culture. The village was founded by Jajasie Adoemakeë in the middle of the 19th century. Adoemakeë started working at a nearby wood plantation, and claimed to have received ownership after the plantation owner died in 1861, however the deed was lost.

The village has a mixed population of the Ndyuka, Saramaka, and Matawai tribes. In the late 19th century, the village was a stronghold of the Gaan Gadu (Great God) religion which rapidly spread to the Creole and Maroon communities.
