= Sunny Point =

Sunny Point may refer to:

- Military Ocean Terminal Sunny Point, a military terminal in Boiling Spring Lakes, North Carolina
- Sunny Point, Koewarasan, a squatted village in Koewarasan, Suriname
