= Torarica =

- Village
- Location within Suriname
- Country: Suriname
- District: Para District
- Resorts: Oost
- Time zone: UTC-3 (AST)

Torarica was the original capital of Suriname. It was settled by Portuguese Jews in 1629. One origin offered for its name is as a Portuguese coinage meaning "Opulent Torah". The Portuguese Jews arrived via Holland and Brazil. By 1665, the village of Paramaribo was expanded and quickly outranked Torarica.

The name Torarica is still in use by the Torarica Group, the largest hotel chain in Suriname. A former sugar plantation, La Simplicité, is located near the old town.

== See also ==
- Jodensavanne
