= Shahied Wagid Hosain =

Surinamese singer (1962–2021)

- Born: Mohamed Shahied Wagid Hosain; 9 January 1962; Magenta, Koewarasan, Suriname
- Died: 21 March 2021 (aged 59) The Hague, Netherlands
- Genres: Bollywood songs, Sarnami music
- Instruments: vocals, drums, harmonium
- Years active: 1977-1995, 1999-2020

Mohamed Shahied Wagid Hosain (9 January 1962 – 21 March 2021) was a Surinamese singer and musician. He was best known for covering Bollywood songs originated by Mohammed Rafi.

== Career ==
Mohamed Shahied Wagid Hosain was born in Magenta, Koewarasan, Suriname on 9 January 1962. When he was 10 years old, his family moved to Utrecht in the Netherlands; they moved again two years later to The Hague. Many members of his family were musicians: his father Josief and uncle Poeti would sing Bollywood songs and Baithak Gana.

In 1977, his uncle Hafizkhan formed a band called Mastana with six other musicians (four from the Wagid Hosain family) to perform at functions. Hafizkhan then recruited Wagid Hosain as drummer although Wagid Hosain had never played before. After a few lessons and intensive practice, Wagid Hosain caught up and began improvising his own drum patterns. Mastana performed instrumental covers of Bollywood songs, especially those sung by Mohammed Rafi, Mukesh, Talat Mahmood, and Kishore Kumar. They occasionally performed with singers. On some nights, when the band had finished their program, Wagid Hosain had his first opportunities to sing; he would choose famous songs of Rafi such as "Suhani Raat Dhal Chuki" (from the film Dulari), "Chaudhvin Ka Chand" (from the film of the same name) and "Mujhe Pyar Ki Zindagi Denewale" (from the film Pyaar Ka Saagar). These performances were popular with audiences; although his uncle and bandmates also liked his singing, they stayed with their instrumental repertory.

In 1984, Mastana embarked on a seven-performance tour in Suriname organised by Surinamese impresario Dinesh Malhoe. All the concerts were sold out. Although Wagid Hosain felt the pre-tour practices were grueling, his singing was well-received by the audiences in Suriname. In 1986, Mastana toured Suriname again, this time accompanied by Saeed Rafi (one of Mohammed's sons). Saeed was particularly impressed by Wagid Hosain's performance of the Mohammed Rafi song "Mera To Jo Bhi Kadam Hai" (from the film Dosti).

Upon his return to the Netherlands, Wagid Hosain continued as a drummer with Mastana. However, his career changed after he performed at a function with the Indian Diamonds, substituting for one of their regular singers. While Wagid Hosain was not familiar with the band's program, his performance was a success. The band's leader Hans Jagbandhan immediately invited him to join. While he gained confidence in his own singing, Wagid Hosain still praised the techniques of other Surinamese singers like Nadeem Khan and Wim Damri. Khan and Wagid Hosain were both members of popular bands, and developed a friendly rivalry.

In 1986, Wagid Hosain released a CD single (designing the CD sleeve himself) with his most known Rafi cover, "Oh my love" (from the film Night in London). The B-side was "Ek bechara" (from the film Waris). Although he also released original songs (written and arranged by his uncle Hafizkhan), they were not as popular as his Bollywood covers.

Wagid Hosain considered his time with the Indian Diamonds (1986-1995) as the peak of his career: they recorded many records and CDs which were popular throughout the Netherlands, Suriname, and the Dutch Caribbean. He took a hiatus from music in 1995. He returned to performing in 1999 as lead singer of Diamonds 2000 (successor to Indian Diamonds), then joined the Sound Tronics in 2002. He later became a solo artist. In 2012, he performed his last big show in Suriname at the Anthony Nesty Indoor Stadium. His last performance in the Netherlands was at the Theater Regentes in The Hague on 2 February 2020.

== Death ==
In 2019, Wagid Hosain was diagnosed with cancer. He announced in February 2021 that his cancer was terminal, and died a month later in his hometown The Hague, the Netherlands, on 21 March 2021 at the age of 59. His Janazah was performed on 23 March 2021.

== Honours ==
On 9 March 2021 Wagid Hosain was named to the Honorary Order of the Yellow Star (Knight class) by the president of Suriname. His wife Barsatie accepted the decoration on his behalf from the Surinamese ambassador to the Netherlands.
