= De Nieuwe Grond =

Coordinates: 5°45′2″N 55°12′5″W

- Resort
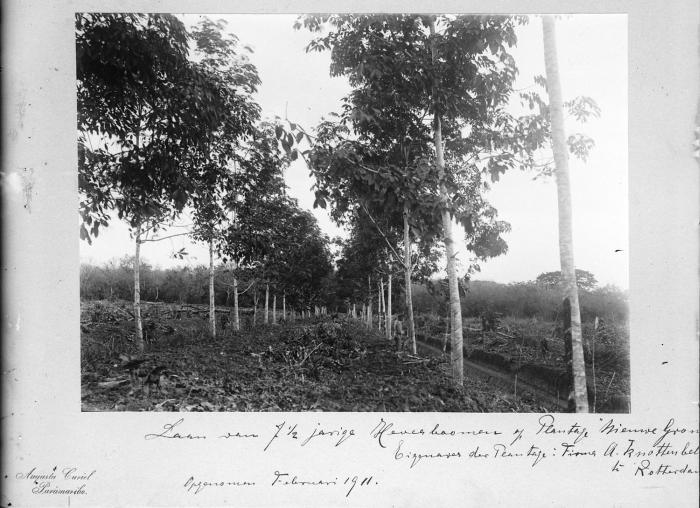
- Rubber trees on De Nieuwe Grond (1911)

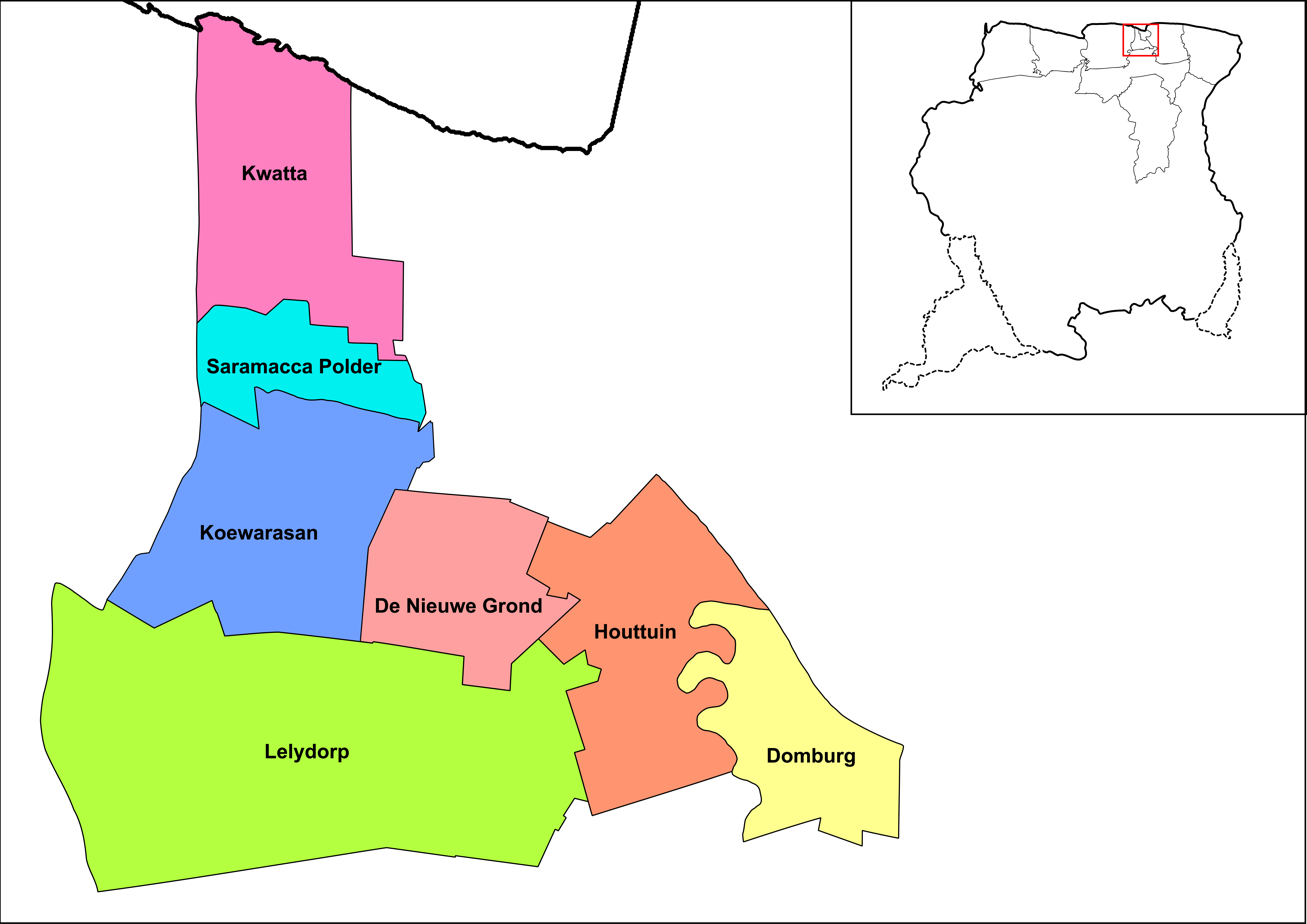
- Map showing the resorts of Wanica District. De Nieuwe Grond
- Country: Suriname
- District: Wanica District

Area
  - Total: 38 km^{2} (15 sq mi)

Population (2012)
  - Total: 26,161
  - Density: 690/km^{2} (1,800/sq mi)
- Time zone: UTC-3 (AST)

De Nieuwe Grond is a resort in Suriname, located in the Wanica District. Its population at the 2012 census was 26,161. Its main ethnic groups are East Indian, and Creoles. The resort is named after a sugar plantation in 1770. The plantation was already abandoned in 1863, when slavery was abolished, because that year, it was up for public auction. The area used to consist of small scale agriculture with a focus on vegetables and rice, but due to its proximity to Paramaribo, it has become a suburban area with a young population. In 2019, a new bigger market opened in the town.
