= Noord, Suriname =

Coordinates: 5°36′38″N 55°17′30″W

Noord
- Resort
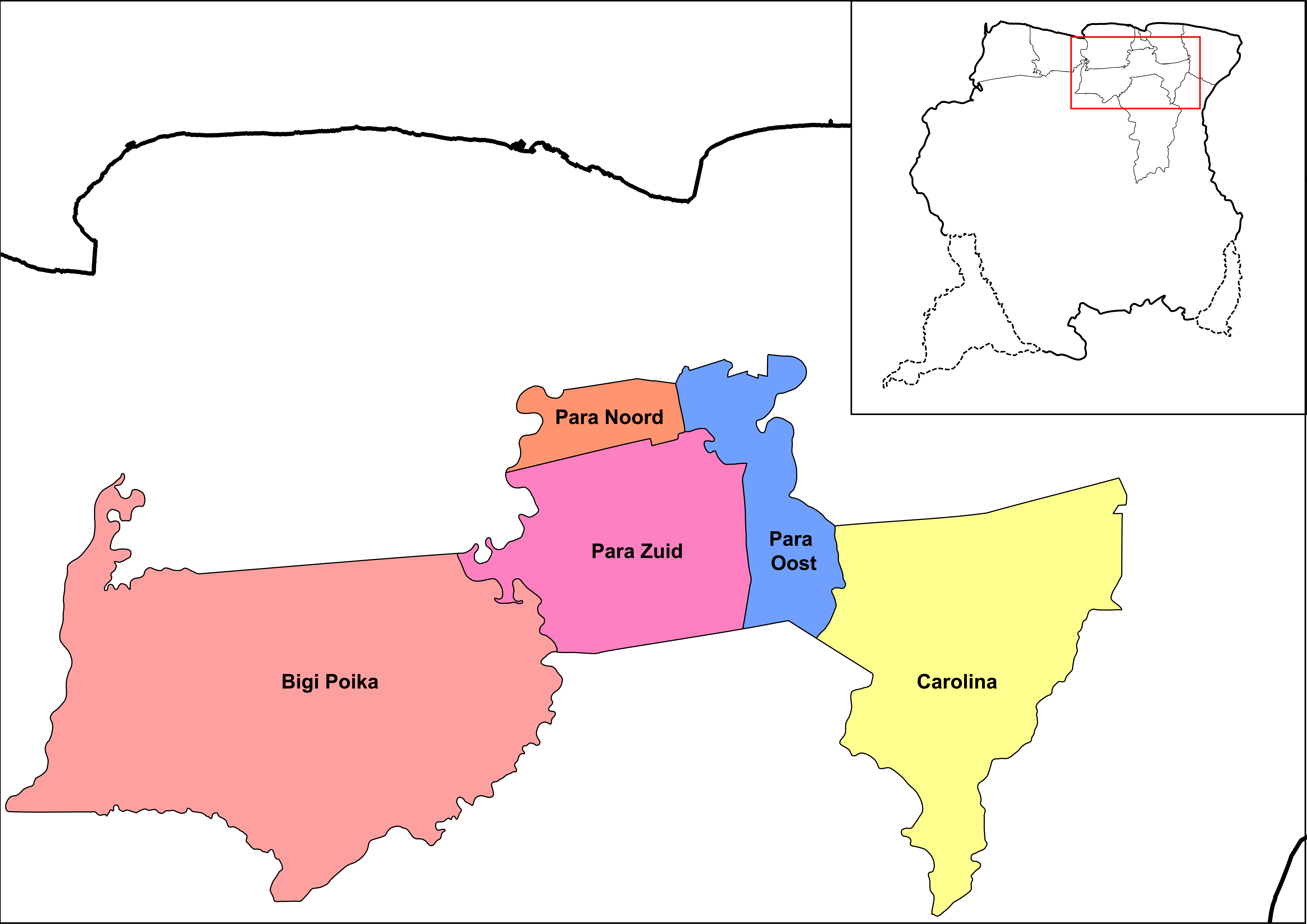
- Map showing the resorts of Para District. Noord
- Country: Suriname
- District: Para District

Area
  - Total: 236 km^{2} (91 sq mi)

Population (2012)
  - Total: 9,703
  - Density: 41.1/km^{2} (106/sq mi)
- Time zone: UTC-3 (AST)

Noord is a resort in Suriname, located in the Para District. Its population at the 2012 census was 9,703. Noord is mainly an agricultural area, and has a school.

The main town in the Noord resort is Onverwacht which is also the capital of the District. The indigenous village of Bernharddorp is one of the larger settlements in the resort. The village has a population of about 1,800 people as of 2020,
