= Pontbuiten =

- Resort
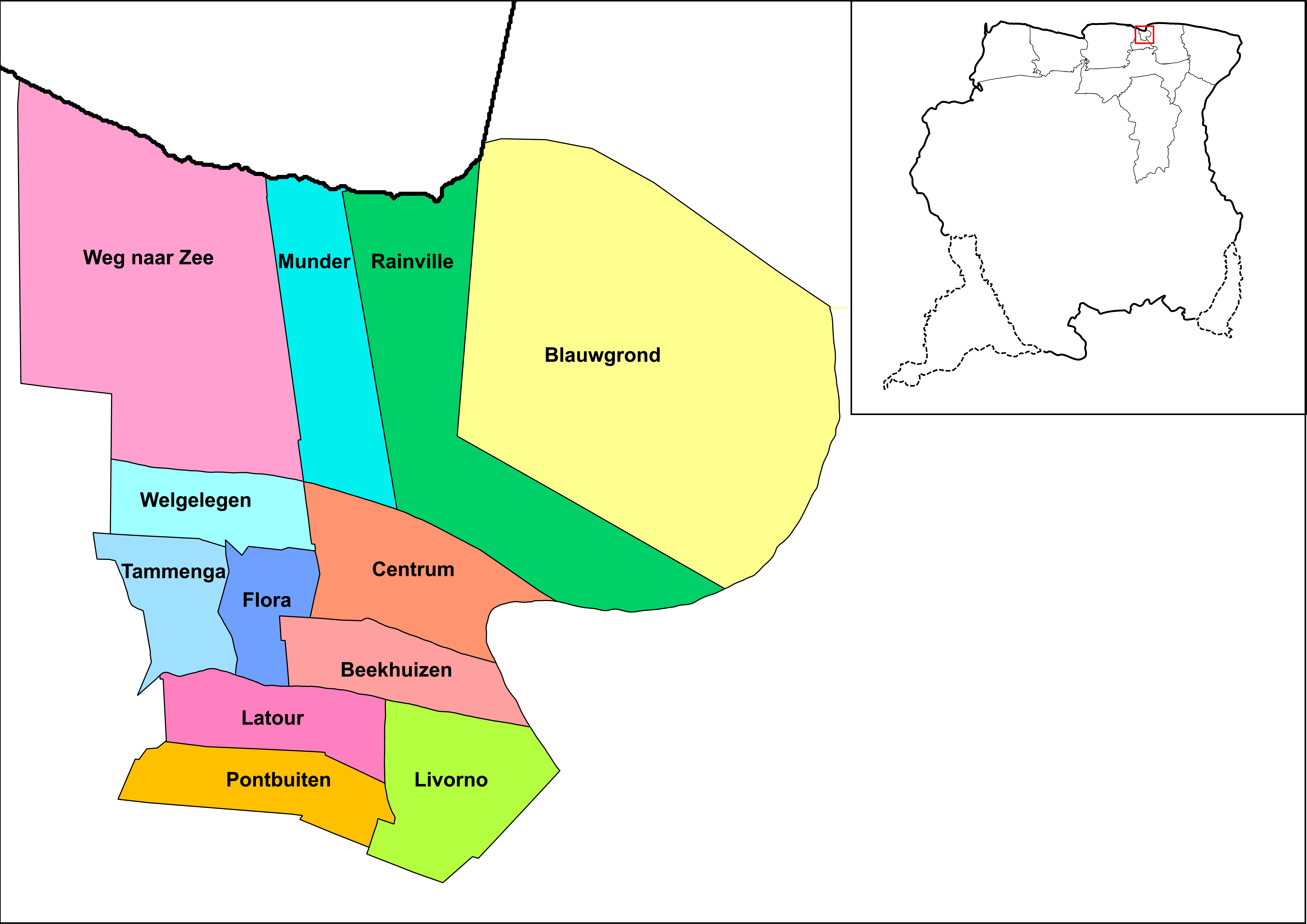
- Map showing the resorts of Paramaribo District. Pontbuiten
- Coordinates: 5.7834°N 55.2082°W
- Country: Suriname
- District: Paramaribo District

Area
  - Total: 6 km^{2} (2.3 sq mi)

Population (2012)
  - Total: 23,211
  - Density: 3,900/km^{2} (10,000/sq mi)
- Time zone: UTC-3 (AST)

Pontbuiten is a resort in Suriname, located in the Paramaribo District. Its population at the 2012 census was 23,211.

Pontbuiten was founded in the mid 20th century by the Pont family, and was intended for agriculture.
