= Marijke Djwalapersad =

Suriname politician (1951–2025)

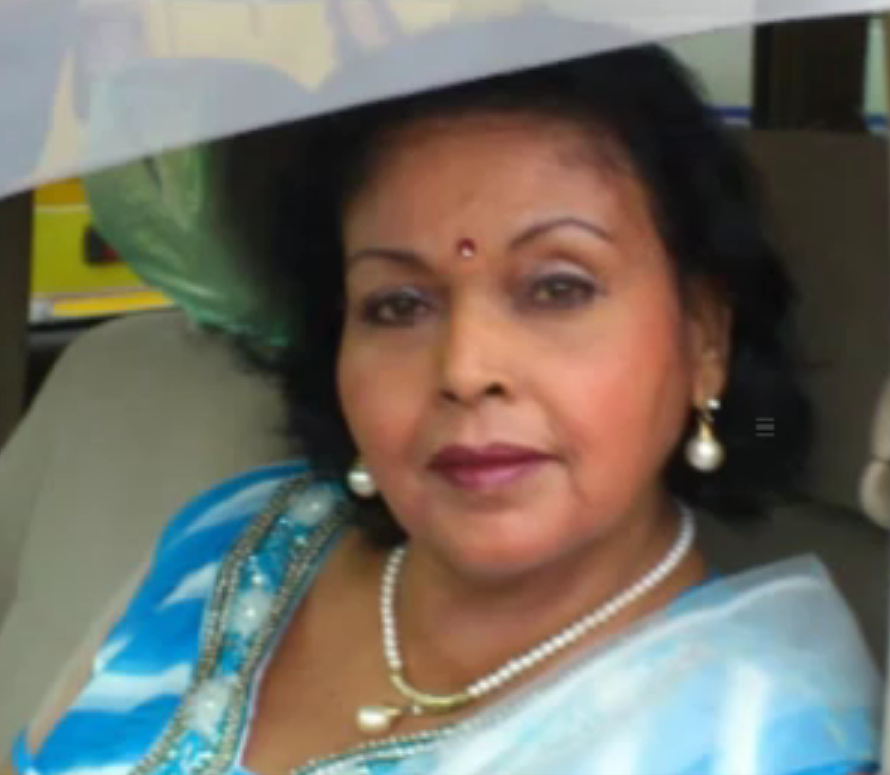

Chairperson of the National Assembly of Suriname
- In office 10 October 1996 – 23 July 2000
- Preceded by: Jagernath Lachmon
- Succeeded by: Jagernath Lachmon

Personal details
- Born: Marijke Indradebie Djwalapersad; 28 December 1951 Saramacca Polder, Wanica District, Surinam
- Died: 11 September 2025 (aged 73)
- Party: Naya Kadam (1999–2005); Basic Party for Renewal and Democracy (BVD) (1996–1999); Progressive Reform Party (VHP) (–1996)

Marijke Indradebie Djwalapersad (28 December 1951 – 11 September 2025) was a Surinamese politician who served as Chairperson of the National Assembly of Suriname from 1996 until 2000. She was the first woman to serve as chairperson. In 1999, Djwalapersad founded the political party Naya Kadam, but was not re-elected.

== Life and career ==
Djwalapersad was born in the Saramacca Polder on 28 December 1951. She was active as a translator in Hindi, English, Sarnami, Sranan Tongo, and Dutch. In 1991, she joined the Progressive Reform Party (VHP), but failed to be elected.

She was first elected to the National Assembly in 1996. After the elections, there was a disagreement within the VHP whether they should become part of the government. Five elected members including Djwalapersad split from the VHP, and formed the Basic Party for Renewal and Democracy (BVD) which would enter into a coalition government with the NDP. On 10 October 1996, Djwalapersad was elected Chairperson of the National Assembly of Suriname, and was the first woman to serve as chairperson. During her tenure as chairperson, she cancelled all international trips by Assembly members, because the economic climate did not allow for it. She also ended payment for absentee Assembly members.

In 1999, Djwalapersad founded the political party Naya Kadam, but remained chairperson. She was not re-elected during the 2000 elections, and Jagernath Lachmon was chosen as the new chair. Djwalapersad would become the only female chairperson of the Sanatan Dharm Foundation, an organisation for practitioners of the Sanātanī faction of Hinduism. In 2019, Djwalapersad was awarded the Golden Gavel Award by the Platform Politically Active Women.

Djwalapersad died on 11 September 2025, at the age of 73.
