= Saramacca Polder =

Coordinates: 5.828889°N 55.253889°W

- Resort
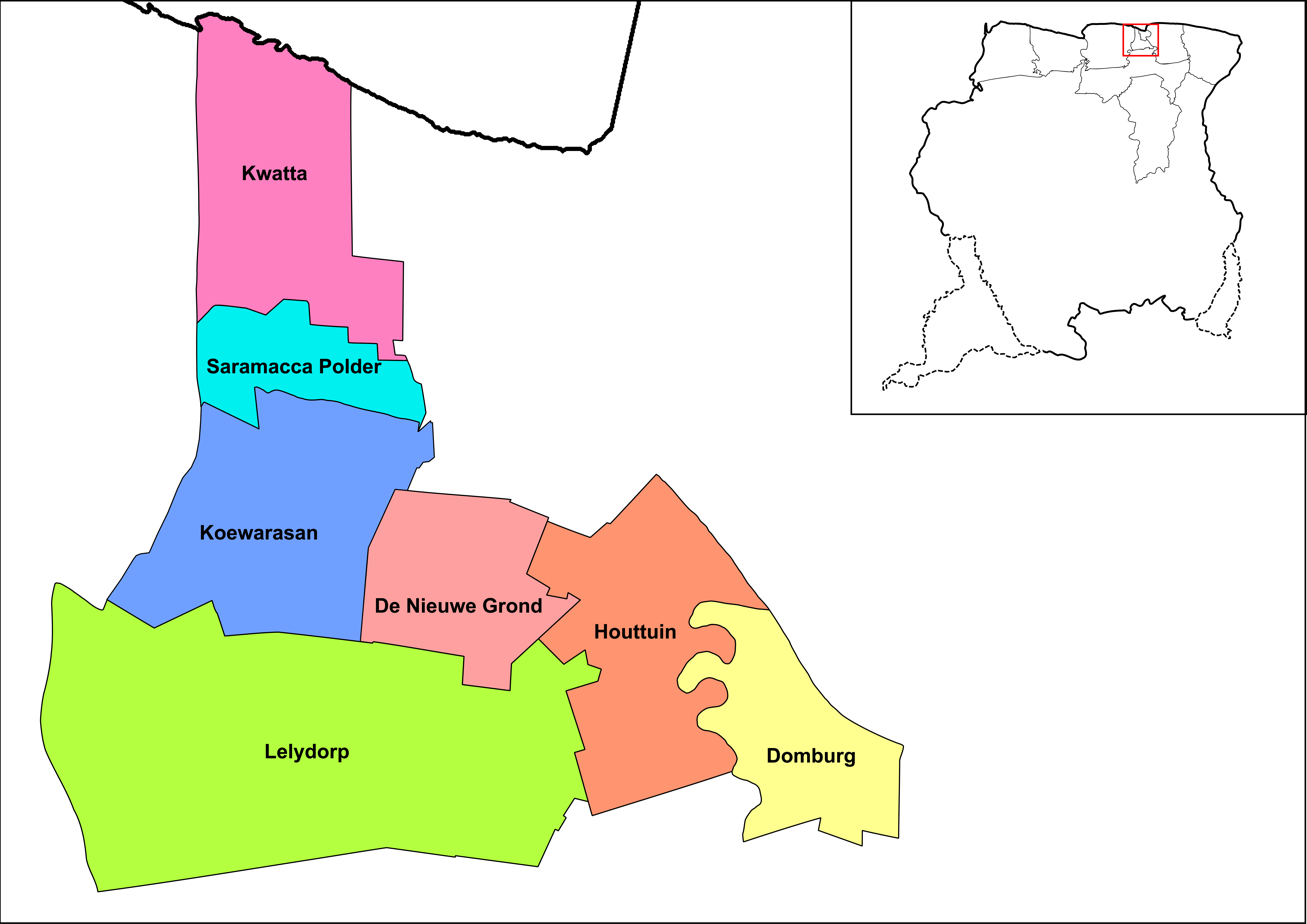
- Map showing the resorts of Wanica District. Saramacca Polder
- Country: Suriname
- District: Wanica District

Area
  - Total: 28 km^{2} (11 sq mi)

Population (2012)
  - Total: 10,217
  - Density: 360/km^{2} (950/sq mi)
- Time zone: UTC-3 (AST)

Saramacca Polder is a resort in Suriname, located in the Wanica District. Its population at the 2012 census was 10,217. And the majority of the population is of East Indian descent. The Saramacca Polder was created between 1894 and 1904. The main function was agriculture. The Commissaris Weytinghweg was built in 1906, and connects the polder with Paramaribo. Initially the area was mainly used for rice cultivation, but has become home to companies and suburban housing.

== Notable people ==
- Marijke Djwalapersad (1951), politician and former chairperson of the National Assembly
