= Lelydorp =

Lelydorp Kofi Djompo (Sranan Tongo)
- Resort and town
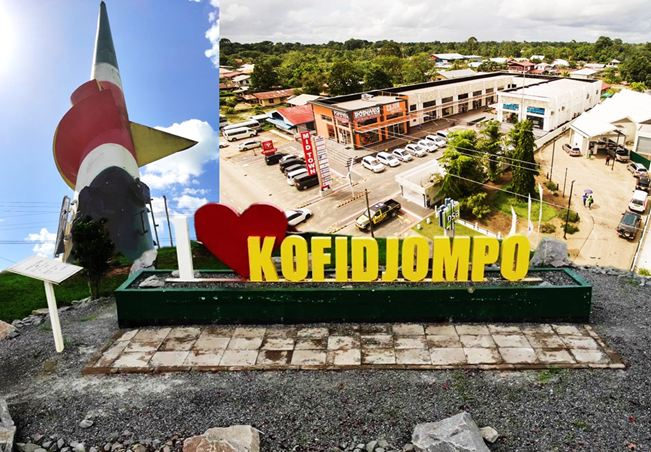
- From top, left to right: Monument Lelydorp; bird's-eye view of Midtown Mall; I Love Kofidjompo Monument

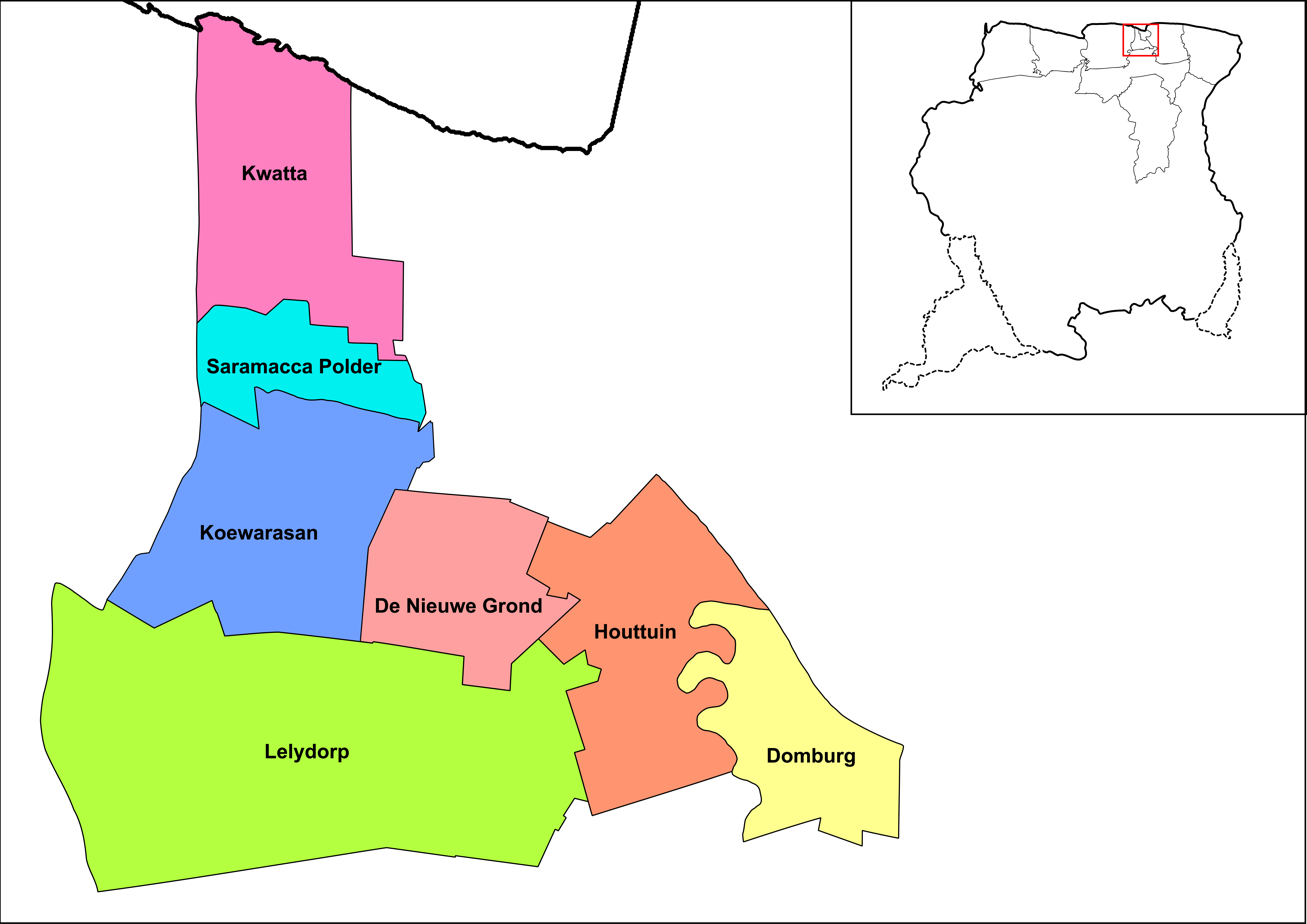
- Map showing resorts in Wanica District. Lelydorp
- Coordinates: 5°41′48″N 55°13′0″W
- Country: Suriname
- District: Wanica District

Area
  - Total: 149 km^{2} (58 sq mi)
- Elevation: 9 m (30 ft)

Population (2012)
  - Total: 18,663
  - Density: 125/km^{2} (324/sq mi)
- Time zone: UTC-3 (AST)

Lelydorp (Sranan Tongo: Kofi Djompo) is the capital city of Wanica District, located in Suriname's north. With a population of 18,663 (2012), it is the second largest city in Suriname, after Paramaribo.

== History ==
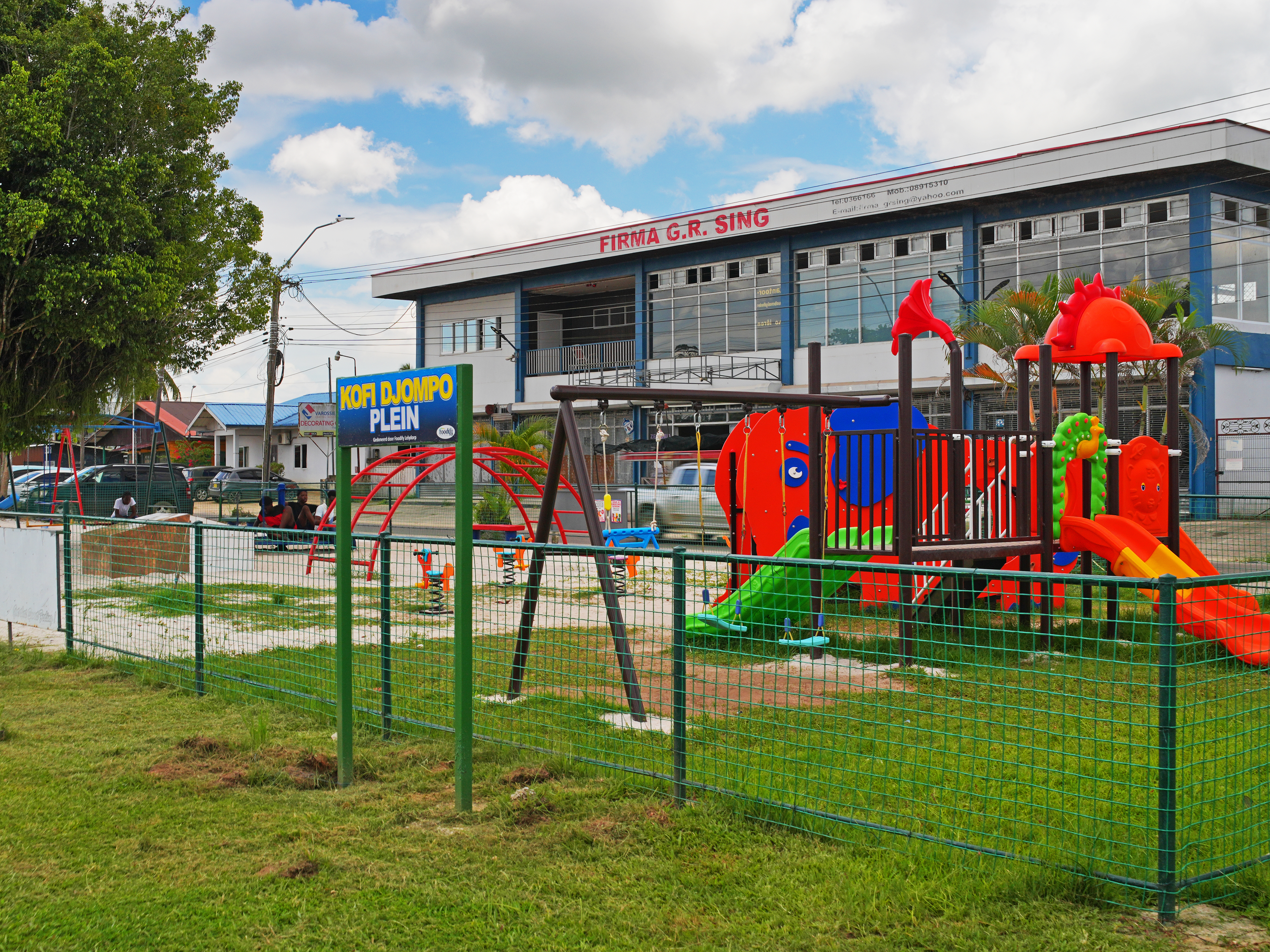
Lelydorp Playground

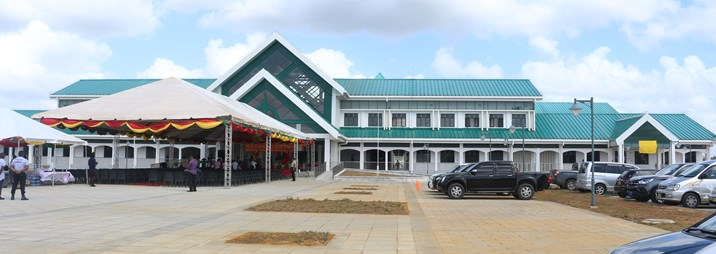
Regional Hospital Wanica

=== Pad van Wanica ===
For centuries the Pad van Wanica (Wanica path) has been the only road that leads Paramaribo to the south. The establishment of the road is unknown, but it is speculated that the original inhabitants formed the path. After the road was established parcels were issued on either side. The oldest part of this road is the northern part, which is closest to Paramaribo. The land issued there date from the early 18th century, with plantation names such as: Hermitage, Zorg en Hoop, Flora, Duisburg, Onverwacht, Goede Verwachting, Ephraimszegen, Nieuw Weergevonden, etc.

Around 1790, a new series of land grants were given that ended on the south of the path, starting with Braamshoop and ending with Halfhideslust followed by Klein Nieuwzorg. These new grounds were used almost exclusively as timber grounds.

=== Kofi Djompo ===
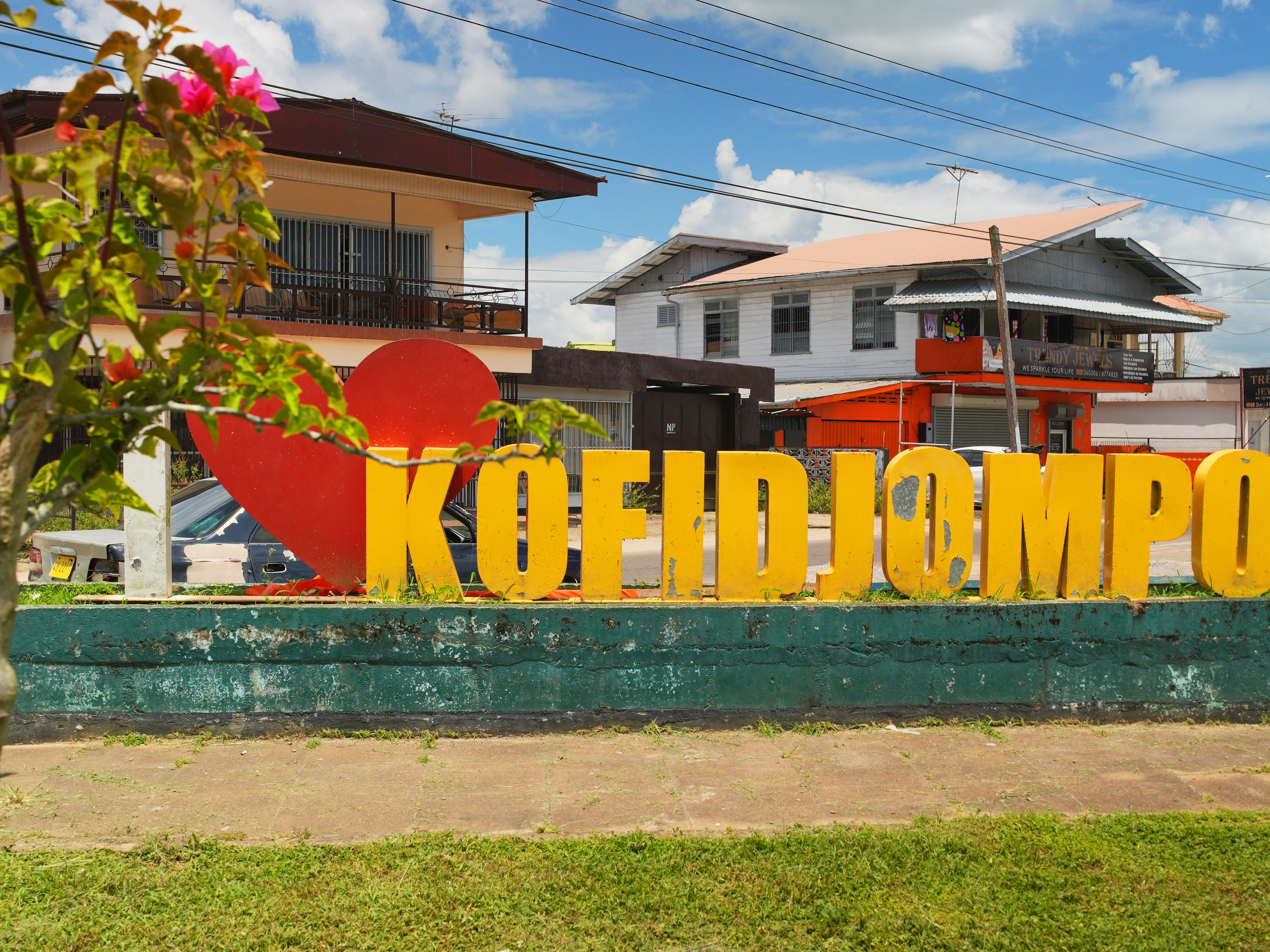
ILoveKofidjompo Monument

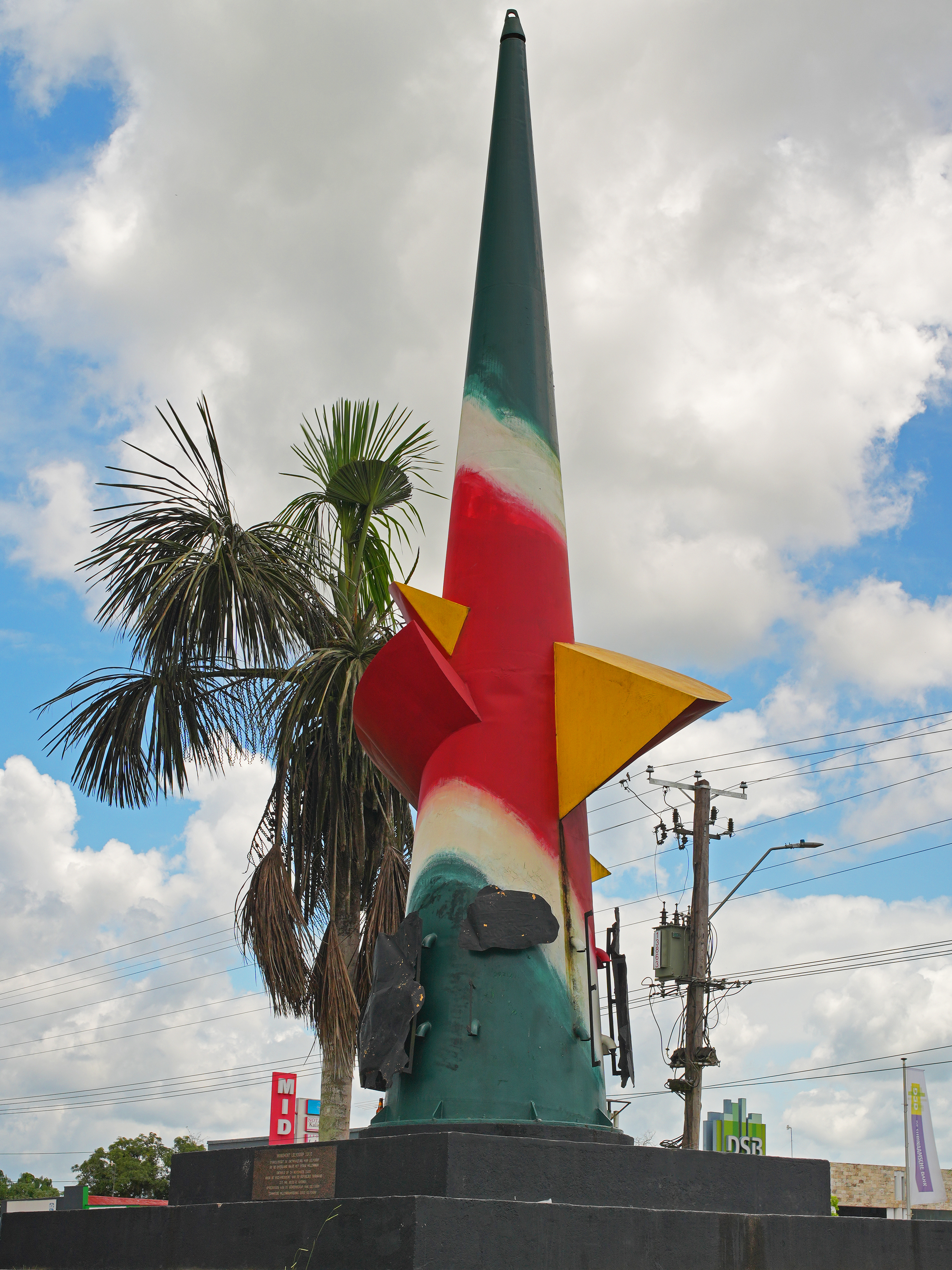
Lelydorp Monument

Lelydorp was originally called Kofi Djompo but was renamed by Cornelis Lely (the Dutch governor of Suriname in 1905) and since then it is known as Lelydorp. Lely was responsible for many large water construction projects in the Netherlands.

The original name Kofi Djompo is said to refer to a maroon rebel leader called Kofi, who escaped by jumping over a creek. Kofi means "born on Friday" (Kofi Annan, for example, was born on a Friday). Djompo means "jump". The hamlet started to grow when the Lawa Railway was constructed, but was mainly dependent on agriculture with cassave and asparagus beans as the main crops.

=== Modern day Lelydorp ===
Lelydorp is considered a big village instead of a city. Wanica has a population of about 118,000 and an area of about 440 km^{2}. With a population of this size, Wanica is one of Suriname's most populated and most urbanised districts. Lelydorp is the main resort of the district with many shops, offices, and businesses, but still needs a clear city structure and has many agricultural areas close to the centre and neighbourhoods.

Lelydorp is also the most important halfway stopping point between Paramaribo and Zanderij, where the Johan Adolf Pengel Airport is located. Its population consists of a mixture of Javanese, East Indian, Creoles, and Europeans. Between 1890 and 1939 many people from Java settled into the area. Names of roads and streets in Lelydorp, like Sumatraweg, Celebesweg and Tawangsarieweg, are typical original names from Indonesia. The Saramacca River divides Lelydorp from Saramacca.

Lelydorp is home to the "Caribbean Centre", a conference center founded by Bhai. On 16 July 2010, the Neotropical Butterfly Park opened. On 7 February 2020, the Regional Hospital Wanica opened in Lelydorp.

== Notable people ==
- Chan Santokhi (1959), President of Suriname, politician and former chief of police.

== Twin city ==
Lelydorp maintains international relations with the twin city of Lelystad.

== See also ==
- Santigron, a Maroon village in the Lelydorp resort.
