= Oost, Suriname =

Coordinates: 5°30′27″N 55°05′33″W

Oost
- Resort
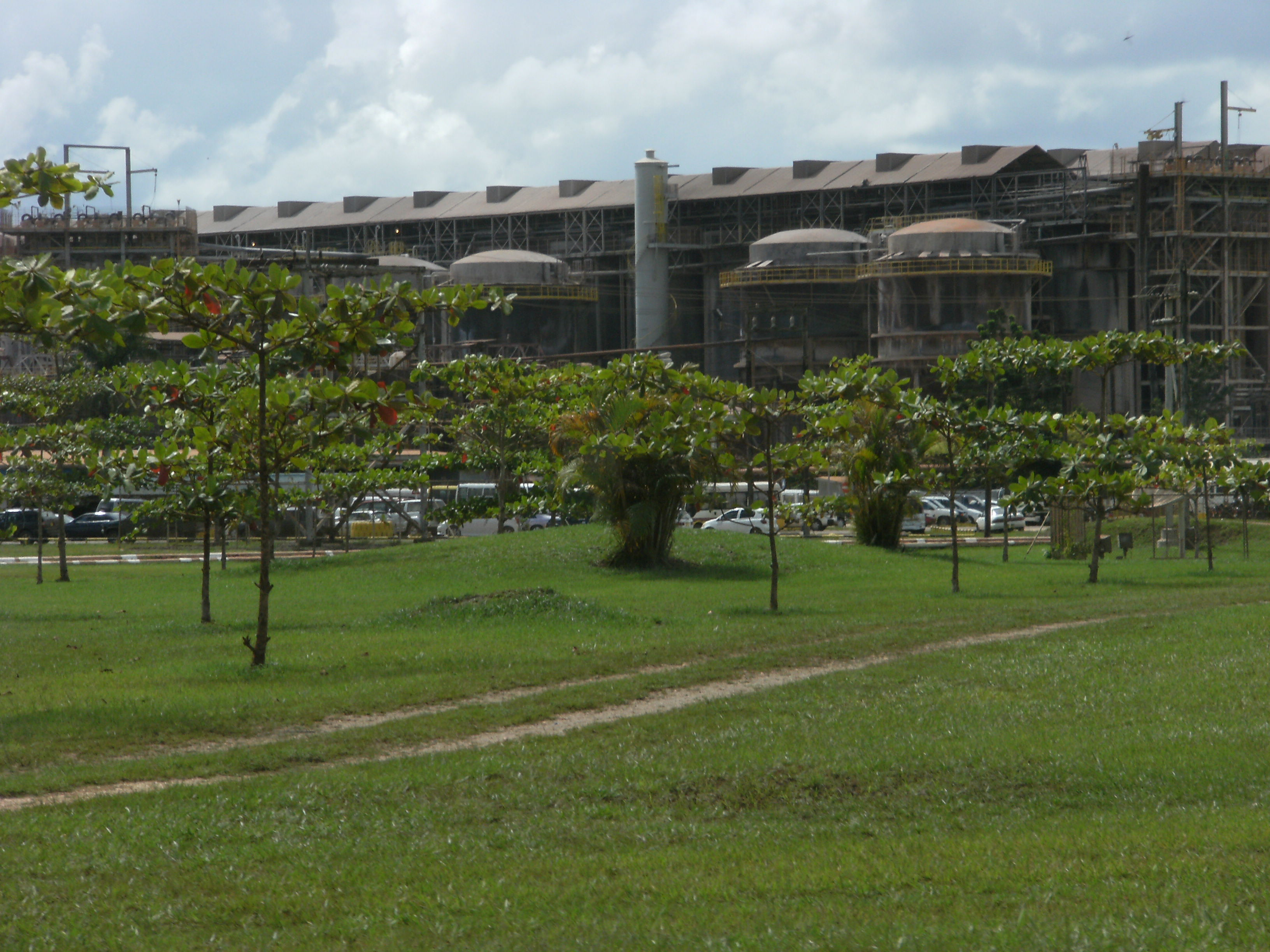
- Bauxite factory at Paranam

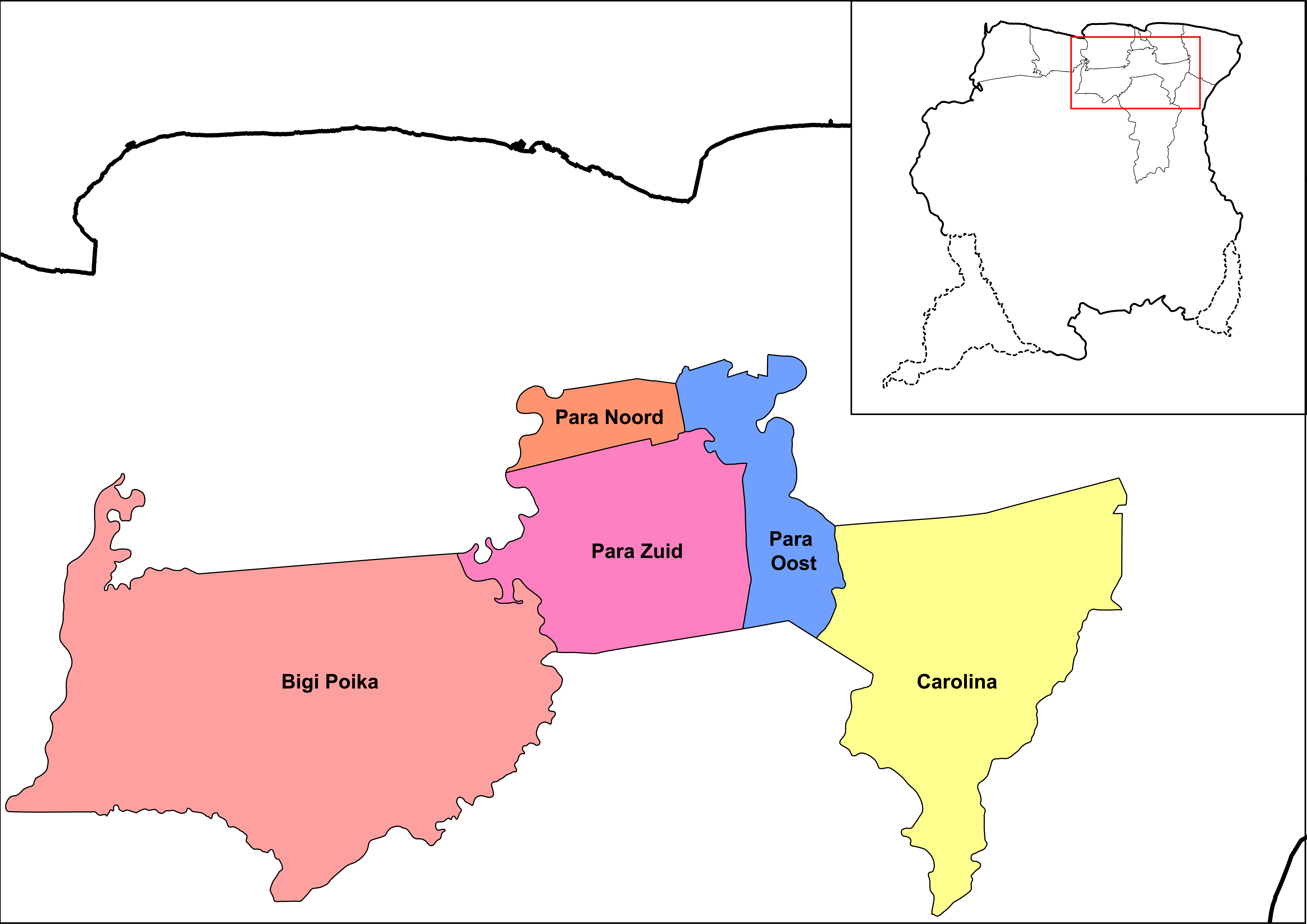
- Map showing the resorts of Para District. Oost
- Country: Suriname
- District: Para District

Area
  - Total: 446 km^{2} (172 sq mi)

Population (2012)
  - Total: 8,016
  - Density: 18.0/km^{2} (46.6/sq mi)
- Time zone: UTC-3 (AST)

Oost is a resort in Suriname, located in the Para District. Its population at the 2012 census was 8,016. The main town in the resort is Paranam. Oost is also home to the former leper colony Bethesda. The Paranam alumina refinery is located near the town of Paranam. The Accaribo area has become a tourist spot with the main attractions being White Beach and Caribo Beach Resort.

The former capital of Suriname, Torarica, is located in the Oost Resort. It was settled by Portuguese Jews in 1629. One origin offered for its name that it is a Portuguese coinage meaning "Opulent Torah". By 1665, the village of Paramaribo had expanded and quickly outranked Torarica.

The Lokono village of Powakka is located in the resort.
