= Koewarasan =

Coordinates: 5°46′11″N 55°17′32″W

Koewarasan ꦏꦸꦮꦫꦱꦤ꧀ (Caribbean Javanese)
- Resort
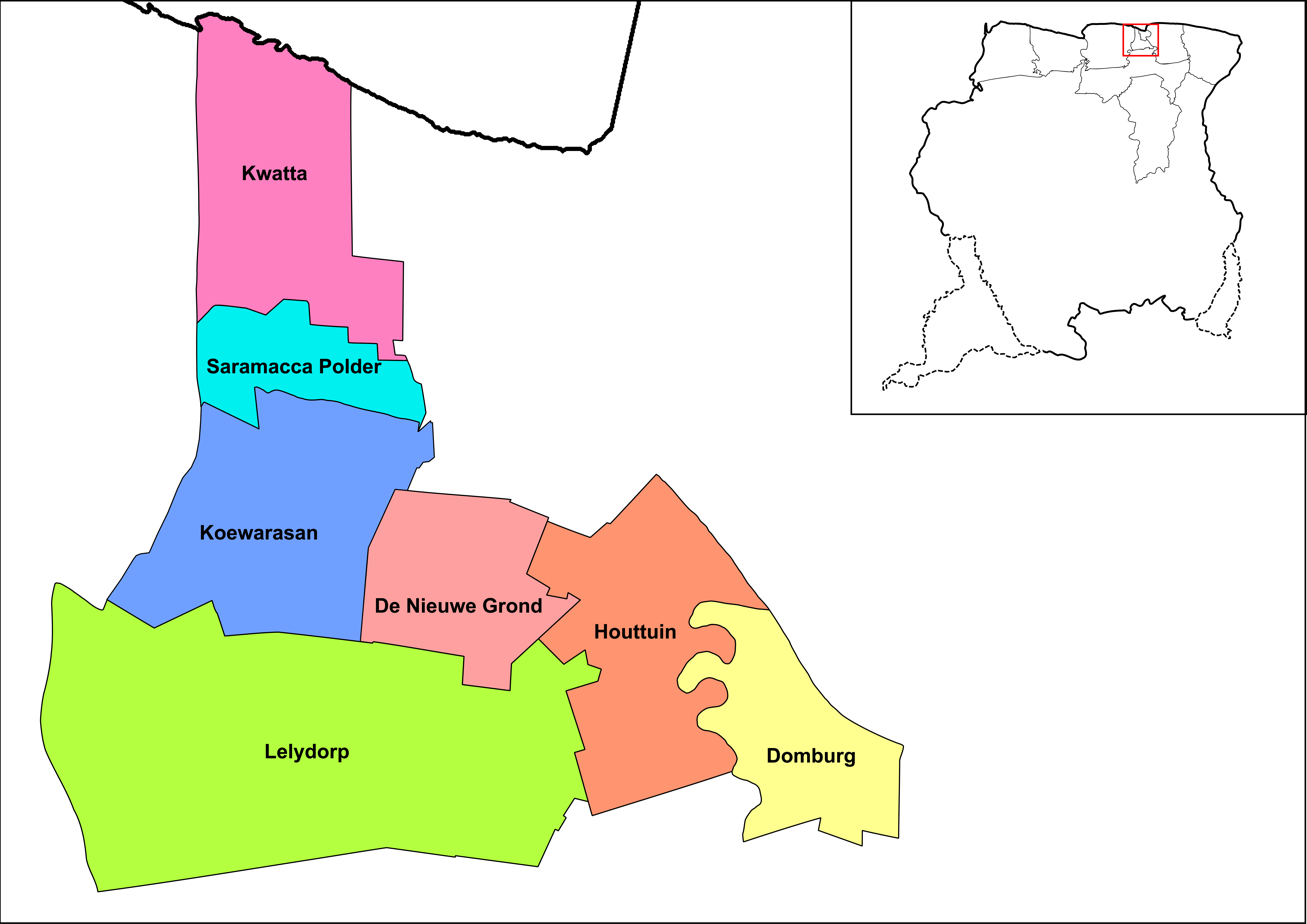
- Map showing the resorts of Wanica District. Koewarasan
- Country: Suriname
- District: Wanica District

Area
  - Total: 71 km^{2} (27 sq mi)

Population (2012)
  - Total: 27,713
  - Density: 390/km^{2} (1,000/sq mi)
- Time zone: UTC-3 (AST)

Koewarasan (Caribbean Javanese: ꦏꦸꦮꦫꦱꦤ꧀, romanized: Kuwarasan lit. 'wellbeing') is a resort in Suriname, located in the Wanica District. Its population at the 2012 census was 27,713. It is located to the west of Paramaribo, and is mainly a suburban area. The municipality was founded in 1939, and was originally intended for the Javanese settlers from Java, however due to World War II, only a single group arrived. The majority of the population are East Indian. Prior to 1939, Koewarasan was an agricultural area used for the cultivation of rice.

== Sunny Point ==
The Surinamese Interior War caused the population of Pokigron to flee. A large group of civilians squatted a terrain on Koewarasan, and have named their village Sunny Point. A school has been setup by the organisation Kansrijk Suriname, and on 24 March 2018, a library opened. On 3 January 2019, 60 families living in Sunny Point-3 faced eviction.

== Notable people ==
- Shahied Wagid Hosain (1962–2021), singer
