= Houttuin =

Settlement in Suriname

Coordinates: 5°44′20″N 55°8′53″W

- Resort
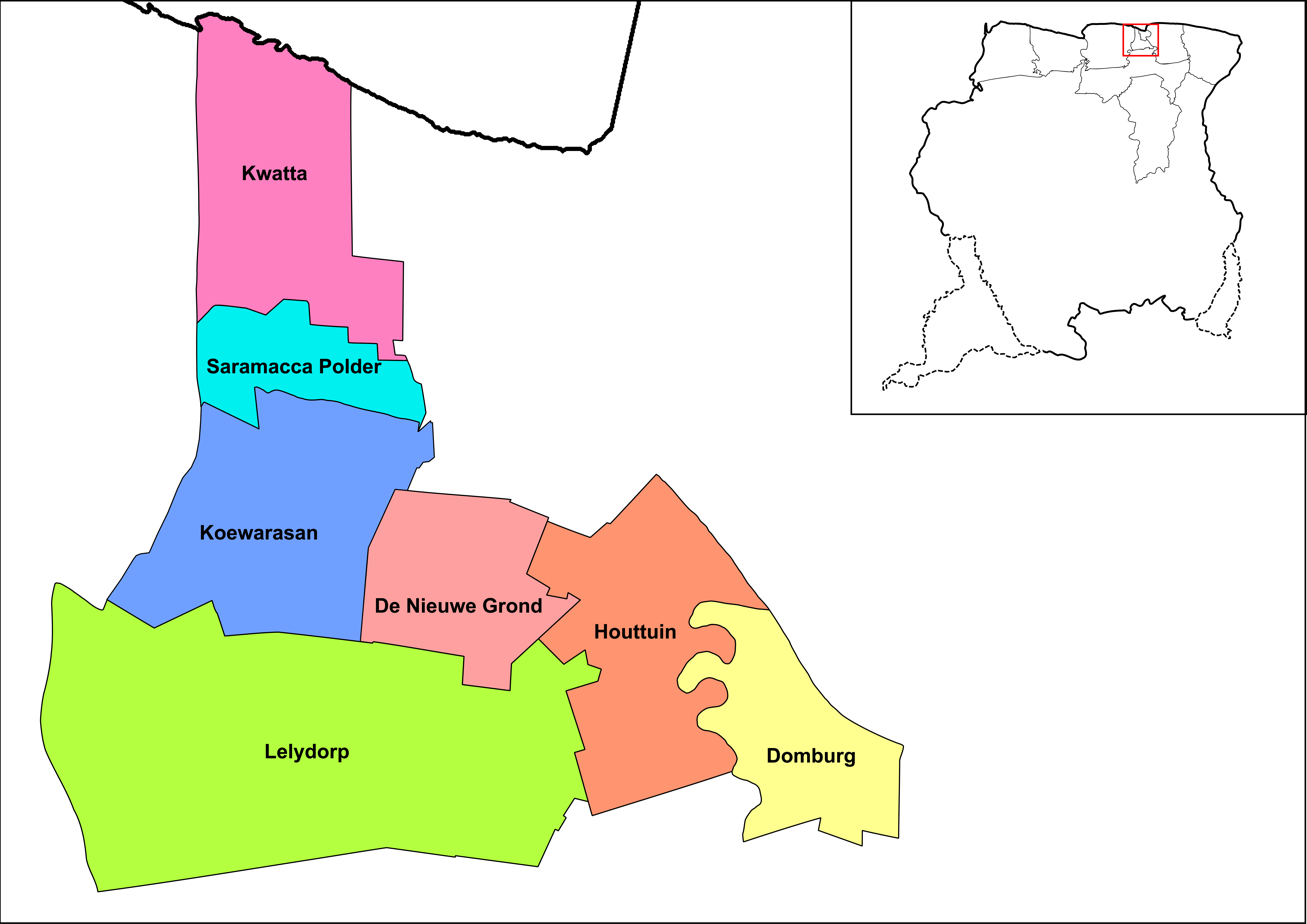
- Map showing the resorts of Wanica District. Houttuin
- Country: Suriname
- District: Wanica District

Area
  - Total: 58 km^{2} (22 sq mi)

Population (2012)
  - Total: 15,656
  - Density: 270/km^{2} (700/sq mi)
- Time zone: UTC-3 (AST)

Houttuin (lit. 'wood garden') is a resort in Suriname, located in the Wanica District. Its population at the 2012 census was 15,656. The largest ethnic group are the Indo-Surinamese. The resort is named after the sugar plantation Houttuyn, which was founded in 1737. The resort was mainly agricultural, and is planned to remain an agricultural centre. In the early 21st century, it has seen a steady population growth, and has become more suburban with housing projects like Tout Lui Faut.

Staatsolie is operating an oil refinery, and a thermal power plant in Houttuin.
