= Wanica District =

District of Suriname

Wanica
- District
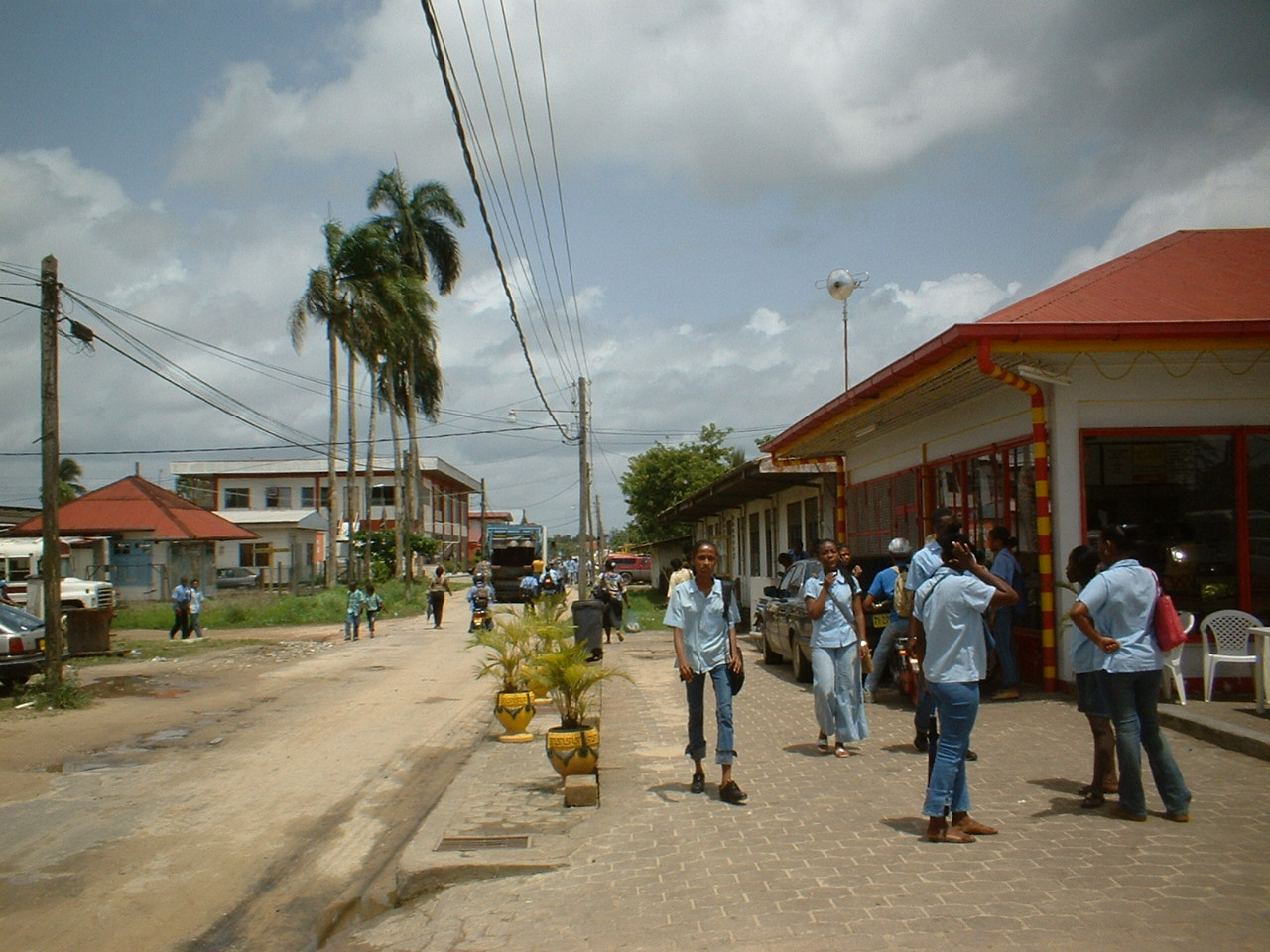

- Map of Suriname showing Wanica district
- Coordinates: 5°48′N 55°16′W
- Country: Suriname
- Capital: Lelydorp

Area
  - Total: 443 km^{2} (171 sq mi)

Population (2012 census)
  - Total: 118,222
  - Density: 267/km^{2} (691/sq mi)
- Time zone: UTC-3

Wanica is a district of Suriname located in the north of the country. Wanica's capital city is Lelydorp, the second-largest city in Suriname. Wanica has a population of 118,222 and an area of 443 km^{2}. Following neighboring Paramaribo, Wanica is the second most populated and urbanized district of Suriname. Two-thirds of the country's population live in these two districts.

== History ==
The district was created in 1983 out of parts of the former Suriname District. The district was named Wanica after Pad van Wanica, the main road, Wanica Creek (present in the district), and the fact that the name had already been used on old maps.

The discovery of gold in Brokopondo and Sipaliwini lead to the construction of the Lawa Railway and growth of the villages next to the railway line, and especially Kofi Djompo. The railway line was decommissioned in 1986.

The district's capital, originally called Kofi Djompo, was renamed in 1905 for Dutch architect Cornelis Lely, who was responsible for many large construction projects in the Netherlands and was also governor of Suriname. Javanese immigration and the closeness to Paramaribo, have resulted in a partially suburban, and still partially agricultural district. The beginning of the 21st century have seen many building projects in the district.

Rice used to be the main crops grown in Wanica, but the late 20th century saw a shift towards animal husbandry. Fruit and vegetables are of lesser significance. Trade and businesses have increased, and are mainly located around Lelydorp. Lelydorp needs a clear city structure and has many agricultural areas close to the centre and neighbourhoods.

== Demographics ==
Ethnic group	Census 2012	
Ethnic group	Number	%
East Indian	51,813	43.8%
Maroon	18,039	15.3%
Creole or Afro-Surinamese	11,629	9.8%
Javanese	21,175	17.9%
Indigenous	1,766	1.5%
Chinese	969	0.8%
White	230	0.2%
Mixed	11,666	9.9%
Other	584	0.5%
Unknown or unspecified	351	0.3%
Total population	118,222	

== Resorts ==
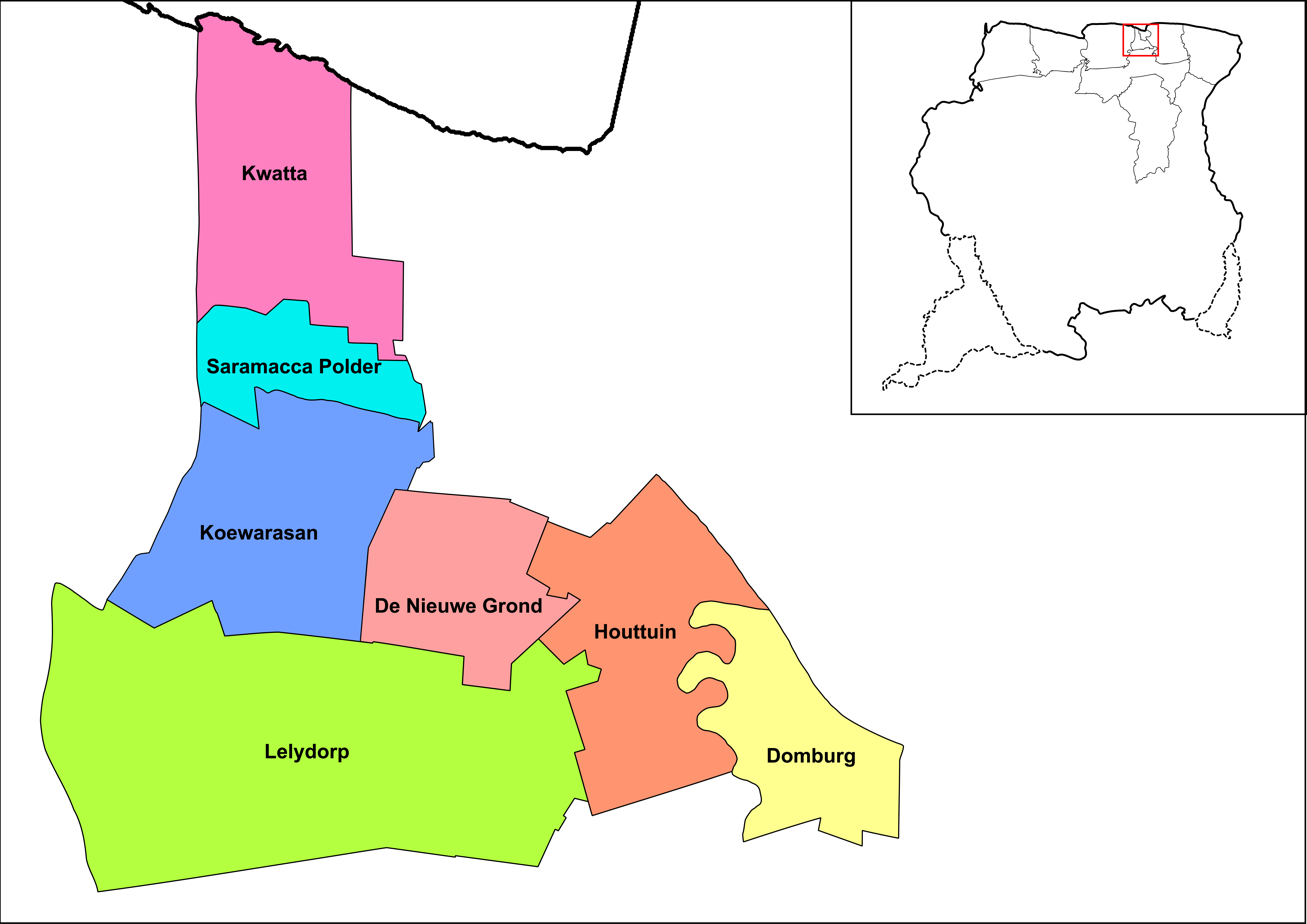
Wanica Districts.

Wanica is divided into 7 resorts (ressorten):

- De Nieuwe Grond
- Domburg
- Houttuin
- Koewarasan
- Kwatta
- Lelydorp
- Saramacca Polder

== Villages ==
- Santigron
