= Resorts of Suriname =

Second-level administrative division in Suriname

The ten districts of Suriname are divided into 63 resorts (Dutch: ressorten). Within Paramaribo District, which is coextensive with the capital, a resort is equivalent to a borough or neighbourhood; in other cases it is more akin to a municipality, consisting of a central place with a few settlements around it. The resorts in the Sipaliwini District are especially large, since the interior of Suriname is sparsely inhabited.

The average resort is about 2,600 square kilometres (1,000 sq mi) and has almost 8,000 inhabitants. According to article 161 of the Constitution of Suriname, the highest political body of the resort is the resort council. Elections for the resort council are held every five years and are usually at the same time as the Suriname general elections.

== Overview map ==
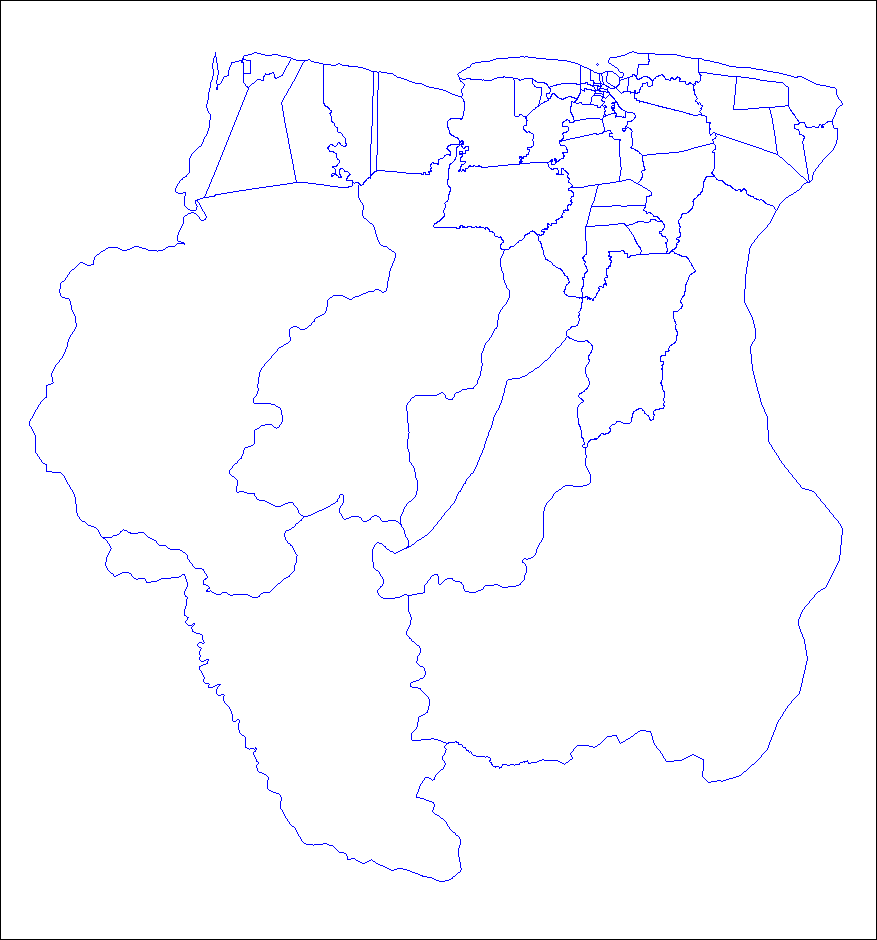
Resorts of Suriname

== List of resorts ==
The resorts are listed below, according to district.

=== Brokopondo District ===
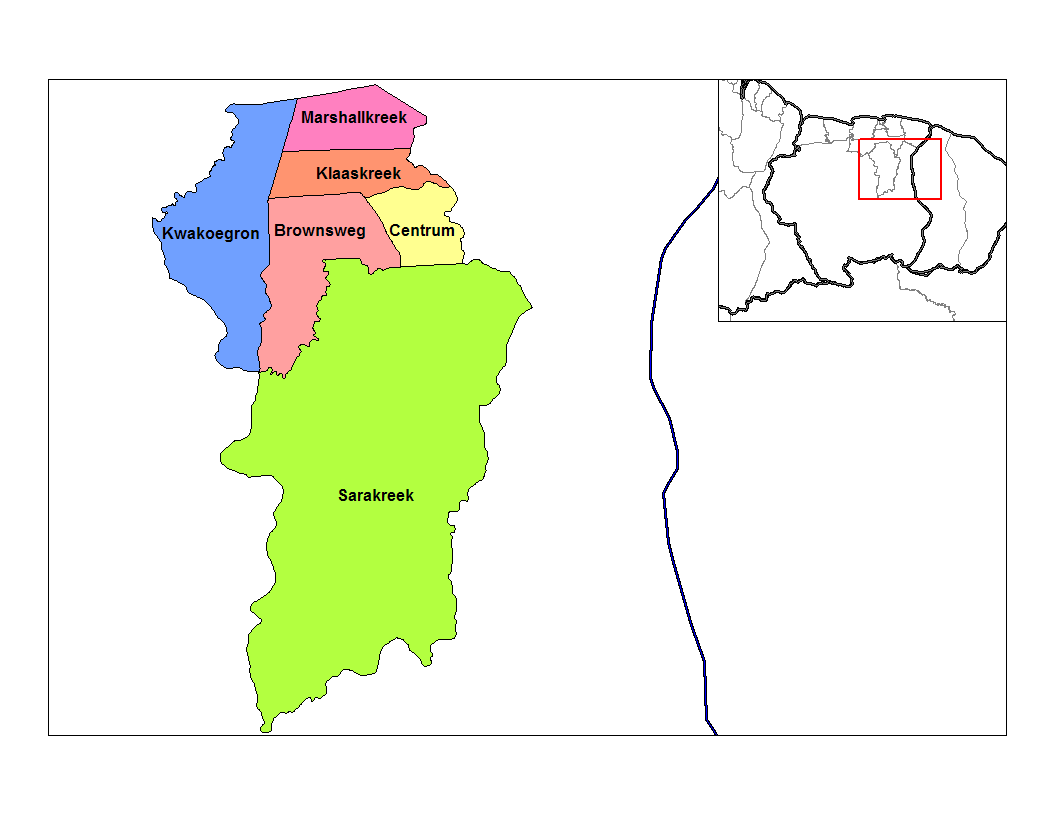
Resorts of Brokopondo

The Brokopondo District consists of the following resorts:

Resort	Area in km^{2}	Population density	Population (2012)
Kwakoegron	1,050	0.2	263
Marshallkreek	354	2.8	1,171
Klaaskreek	349	3.8	2,124
Centrum	314	9.1	4,482
Brownsweg	731	5.3	4,783
Sarakreek	4,566	1.1	3,076

=== Commewijne District ===
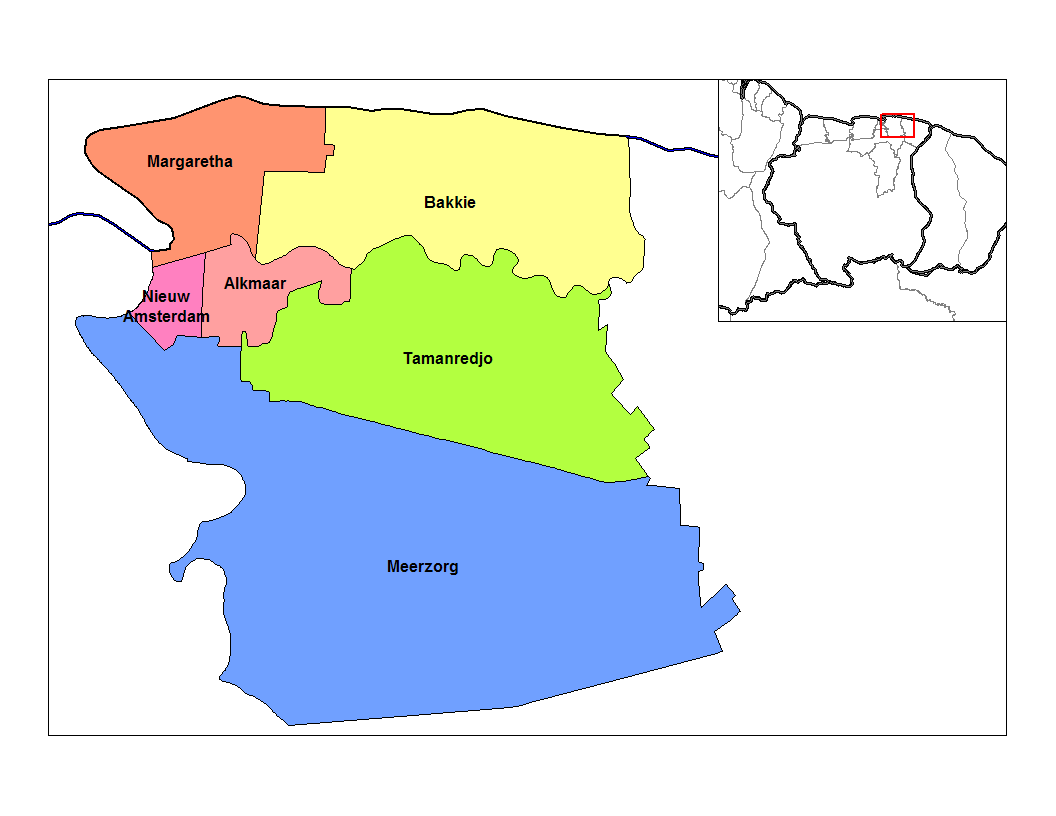
Resorts of Commewijne

The Commewijne District consists of the following resorts:

Resort	Area in km^{2}	Population density	Population (2012)
Margaretha	191	4.1	756
Bakkie	440	1.2	447
Nieuw Amsterdam	48	114.4	5,650
Alkmaar	81	52.0	5,561
Tamanredjo	512	10.8	6,601
Meerzorg	1,081	7.5	12,405

=== Coronie District ===
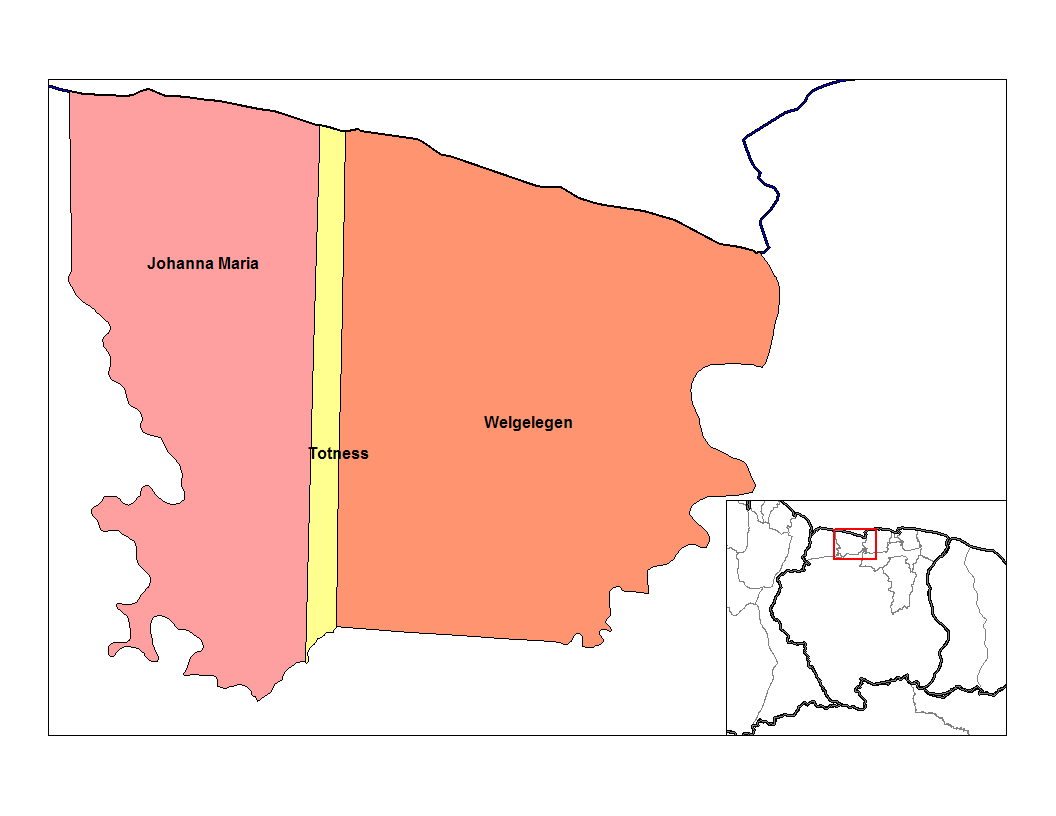
Resorts of Coronie

The Coronie District consists of the following resorts:

Resort	Area in km^{2}	Population density	Population (2012)
Welgelegen	2,143	0.3	593
Totness	173	9.7	2,150
Johanna Maria	1,586	0.4	648

=== Marowijne District ===
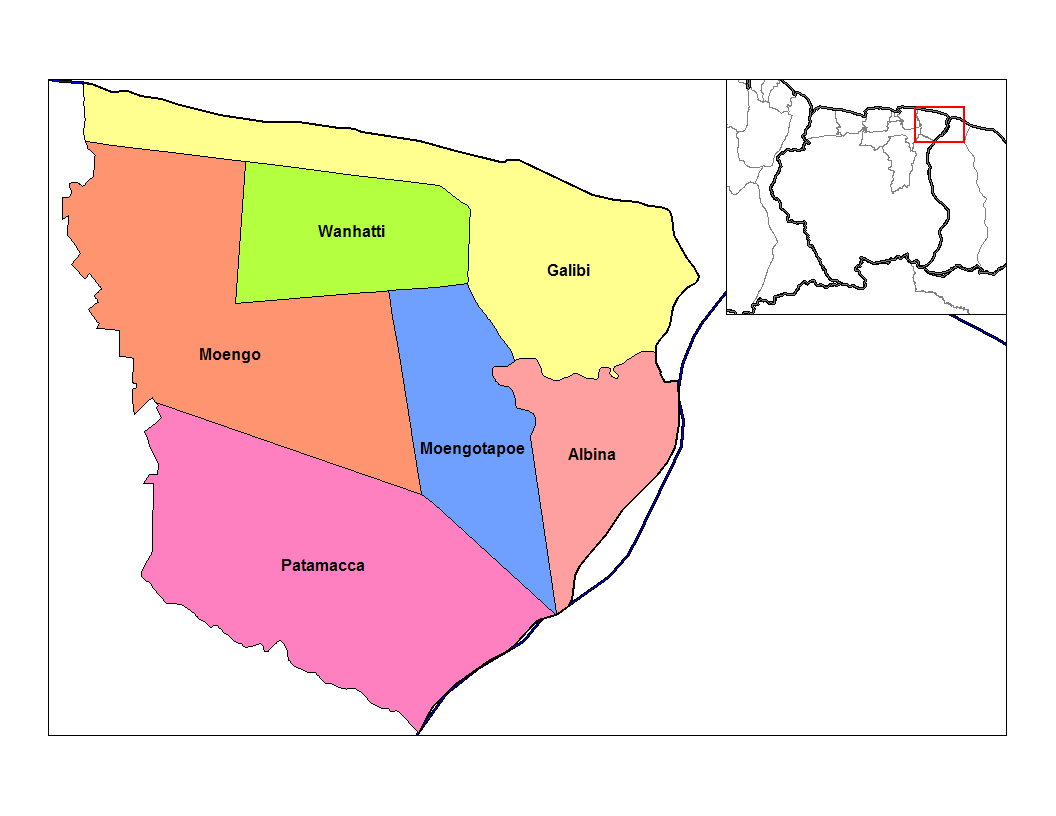
Resorts of Marowijne

The Marowijne District consists of the following resorts:

Resort	Area in km^{2}	Population density	Population (2012)
Moengo	1,117	8.6	10,834
Wanhatti	461	0.8	466
Galibi	1,014	0.7	741
Moengo Tapoe	455	0.9	579
Albina	397	12.9	5,247
Patamacca	1,183	0.4	427

=== Nickerie District ===
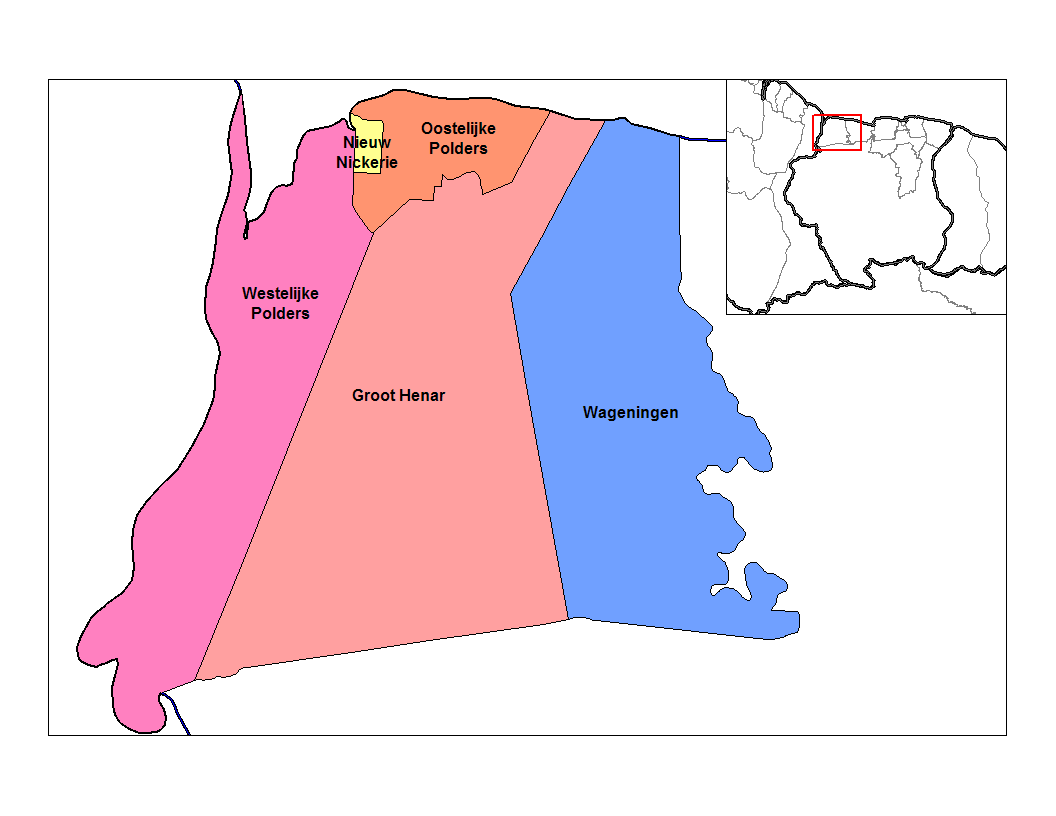
Resorts of Nickerie

The Nickerie District consists of the following resorts:

Resort	Area in km^{2}	Population density	Population (2012)
Wageningen	1,613	2.1	2,937
Groot Henar	2,185	1.6	2,709
Oostelijke Polders	357	19.0	7,153
Nieuw Nickerie	30	461.4	12,818
Westelijke Polders	1,168	7.7	8,616

=== Para District ===
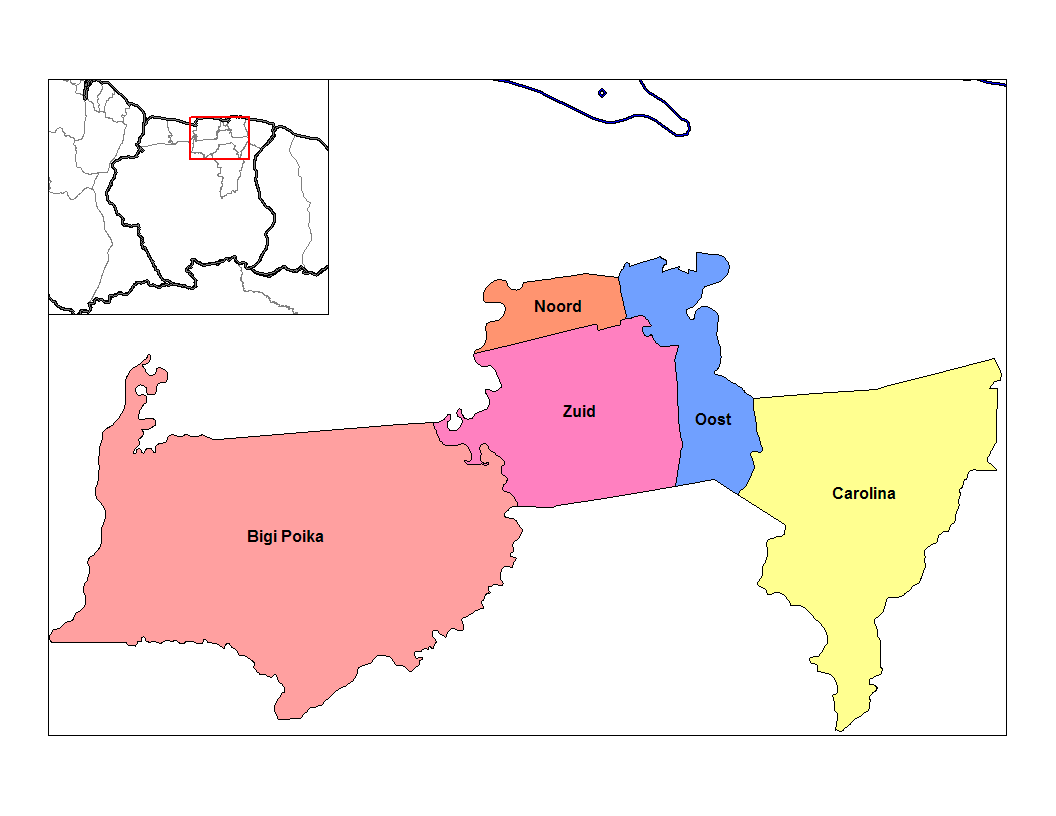
Resorts of Para

The Para District consists of the following resorts:

Resort	Area in km^{2}	Population density	Population (2012)
Para Noord	236	27.3	9,703
Para Oost	446	16.5	8,016
Para, Zuid	909	4.8	6,113
Bigi Poika	2,361	0.1	525
Carolina	1,441	0.2	343

=== Paramaribo District ===
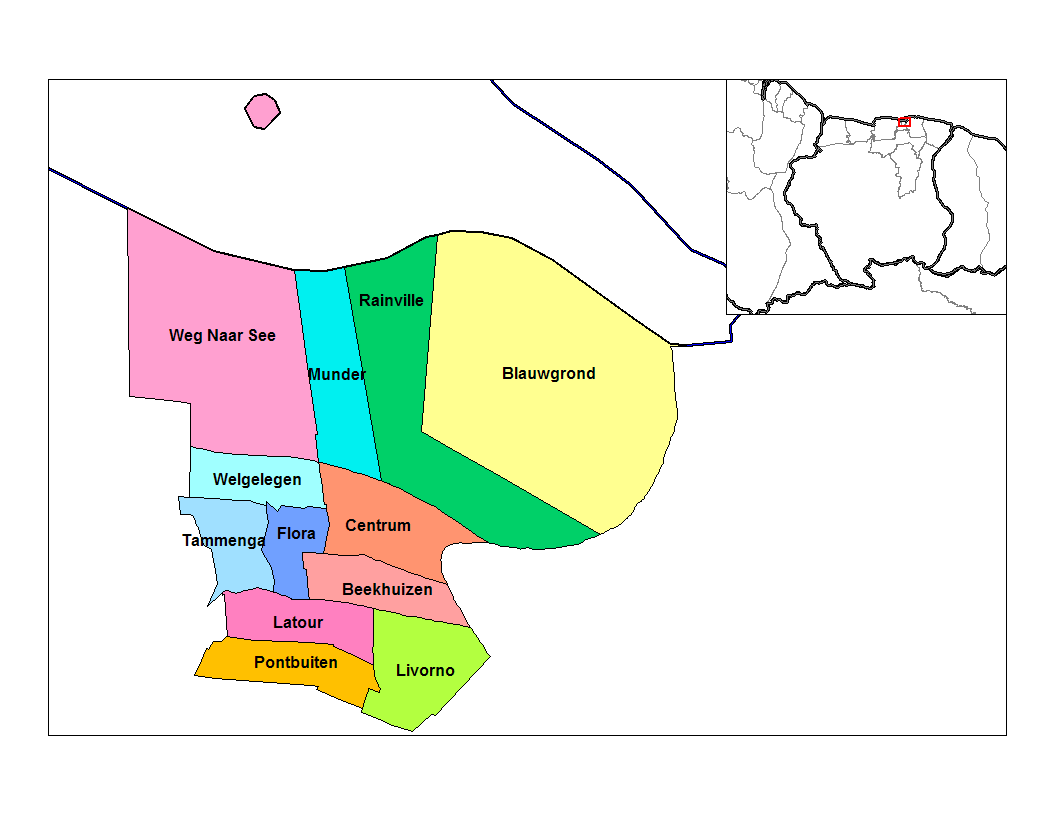
Resorts of Paramaribo

The Paramaribo District consists of the following resorts:

Resort	Area in km^{2}	Population density	Population (2012)
Blauwgrond	43	661.3	31,483
Rainville	31	930.7	22,747
Munder	14	1146.4	17,234
Centrum	9	3252.7	20,631
Beekhuizen	6	3297.2	17,185
Weg naar Zee	41	321.3	16,037
Welgelegen	7	3387.0	19,304
Tammenga	6	2385.5	15,819
Flora	4	3836.5	19,538
Latour	6	4358.0	29,526
Pontbuiten	6	3246.2	23,211
Livorno	9	931.8	8,209

=== Saramacca District ===
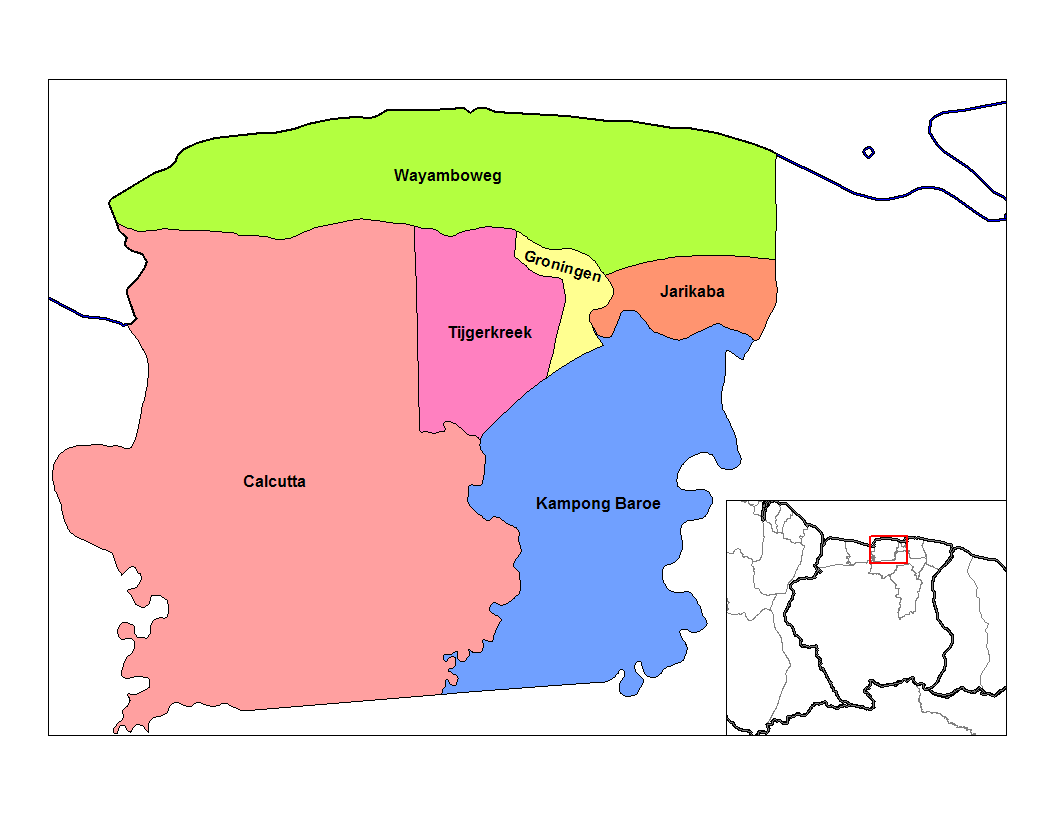
Resorts of Saramacca

The Saramacca District consists of the following resorts:

Resort	Area in km^{2}	Population density	Population (2012)
Calcutta	1,655	1.2	1,647
Tijgerkreek	241	12.0	3,244
Groningen	57	49.6	2,818
Kampong Baroe	684	2.8	2,248
Wayamboweg	872	1.8	1,560
Jarikaba	127	37.9	5,963

=== Sipaliwini District ===
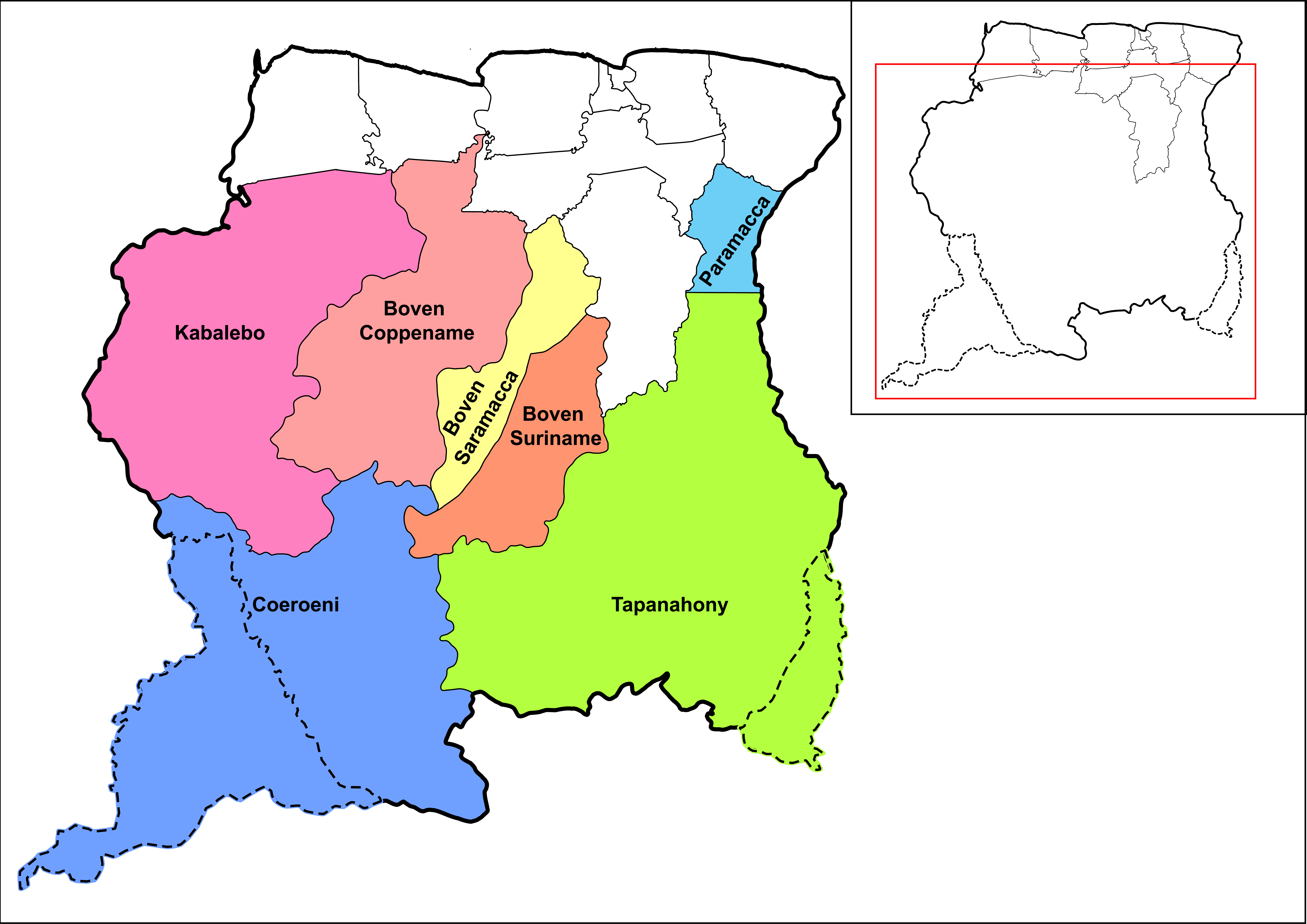
Resorts of Sipaliwini

On 11 September 2019, a new resort was created out of Tapanahony, and is called Paramacca. The Paramacca resort is the northern part of Tapanahony, and mainly inhabited by the Paramaccan people.

The Sipaliwini District consists of the following resorts:

Resort	Area in km^{2}	Population density	Population (2012)
Tapanahony	38,965	0.3	13,808
Boven Suriname	7,512	2.0	17,957
Boven Saramacca	5,929	0.3	1,427
Boven Coppename	15,839	0.0	539
Kabalebo	25,955	0.1	2,291
Coeroeni	33,133	0.0	1,048
Paramacca	3,233	~0.5	1,500-2,000

=== Wanica District ===
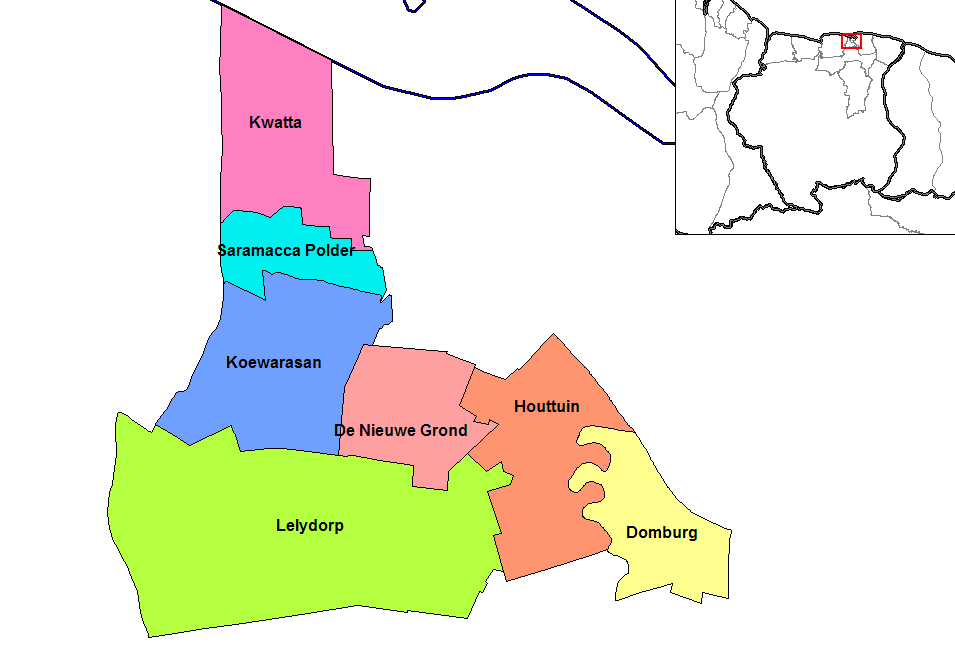
Resorts of Wanica

The Wanica District consists of the following resorts:

Resort	Area in km^{2}	Population density	Population (2012)
Kwatta	62	162.8	14,151
Saramacca Polder	28	278.2	10,217
Koewarasan	71	227.6	27,713
De Nieuwe Grond	38	532.1	26,161
Lelydorp	149	107.0	18,663
Houttuin	58	176.3	15,656
Domburg	37	150.1	5,661

== See also ==
- Districts of Suriname
