= 2010–11 SVB Hoofdklasse =

Hoofdklasse
- Season: 2010–11
- Champions: Inter Moengo (4th title)
- Premiers: WBC (1st title)
- Relegated: The Brothers
- CFU Club Championship: Inter Moengotapoe
- Matches played: 132
- Goals scored: 462 (3.5 per match)
- Top goalscorer: (Suriname) Amaktie Maasie (19 goals)
- Biggest home win: Leo Victor 7–0 Excelsior
- Biggest away win: The Brothers 0–6 Robinhood
- Highest scoring: Kamal 4–5 Inter; Excelsior 6–3 Leo Victor

The 2010–11 Surinamese Hoofdklasse is the 78th season of the Surinamese Hoofdklasse, the highest football league competition of Suriname. The season began on November 17, 2010 and will conclude on September 14, 2011. Inter Moengotapoe are the defending champions.

== Changes from 2009–10 ==
- FCS Nacional and Jai Hanuman were relegated to the Eerste Klasse.
- Excelsior and Kamal Dewaker were promoted to the Hoofdklasse
- The league will play a balanced schedule with 18 games; each team playing every other team twice: home and away. At the conclusion of this, the league will be split into two groups. The teams placed 1st through 6th will play a 10-game double round robin schedule for the championship and Suriname's CFU Club Championship spots, while the teams placed 7th through 10th will play a 6-game double round robin schedule for a direct relegation spot and a promotion/relegation playoff spot.

== Personnel and sponsoring ==
Note: Flags indicate national team as has been defined under FIFA eligibility rules. Players and Managers may hold more than one non-FIFA nationality.

Team	Manager^{1}	Captain	Kit manufacturer	Shirt sponsor
Boskamp	(Suriname) Ricardo Lanveld	(Suriname) Ulrich Reding	Diadora	
The Brothers	(Suriname)	(Suriname)	Joma	Digicel
Excelsior	(Suriname)	(Suriname)	Umbro	Digicel
Inter Moengotapoe	(Suriname) Eduard Redjosentono	(Suriname) Jerome Strijder	Jako	Brunswijkorporate
Kamal Dewaker	(Suriname)	(Suriname)	Umbro	
Leo Victor	(Suriname)	(Suriname) Faizel Hoogdorp	Umbro	Coca-Cola
Robinhood	(Suriname) Arno Burleson	(Guyana) Richard Reynolds	Adidas	Staatoue
Transvaal	(Suriname) William Bundel	(Suriname)	Joma	Enfinity
Voorwaarts		(Netherlands) Ruiz Kromorejo	Legea	Guinness
WBC	(Suriname) Jimmy Hoepel	(Suriname) Johannes Asaimi	Adidas	Digicel

== Regular season ==
=== League table ===
Pos	Team	Pld	W	D	L	GF	GA	GD	Pts	Qualification
1	Walking Bout Company	18	14	3	1	47	17	+30	45	Championship group
2	Inter Moengotapoe	18	14	1	3	50	26	+24	43	Championship group
3	Transvaal	18	9	3	6	37	25	+12	30	Championship group
4	Leo Victor	18	7	6	5	34	28	+6	27	Championship group
5	Kamal Dewaker	18	6	5	7	26	27	−1	23	Championship group
6	Excelsior	18	6	5	7	25	27	−2	23	Championship group
7	Robinhood	18	5	3	10	32	44	−12	18	Relegation group
8	Boskamp	18	3	6	9	22	35	−13	15	Relegation group
9	Voorwaarts	18	4	2	12	18	38	−20	14	Relegation group
10	The Brothers	18	3	4	11	16	40	−24	13	Relegation group

Source: FIFA.com
Rules for classification: 1) points; 2) goal difference; 3) number of goals scored.

=== Results ===
Home \ Away	BOS	BRO	EXC	INT	KAM	LEO	ROB	TRA	VOO	WBC
Boskamp		1–1	1–1	1–5	1–1	0–3	0–1	1–4	3–0	2–1
The Brothers	0–0		3–1	2–3	1–1	0–0	3–2	1–4	1–0	0–3
Excelsior	1–0	3–1		4–1	1–2	1–0	5–2	0–0	0–0	0–3
Inter Moengotapoe	3–1	7–1	3–1		2–1	0–0	3–1	2–1	5–2	0–1
Kamal Dewaker	2–1	2–0	1–1	4–5		2–3	1–1	1–1	1–0	1–2
Leo Victor	3–3	2–1	2–2	1–3	0–1		3–4	2–1	4–0	0–4
Robinhood	2–1	2–1	2–0	1–2	1–2	2–4		2–2	2–3	2–4
Transvaal	3–1	5–0	4–2	0–1	3–1	1–4	3–1		3–1	0–3
Voorwaarts	1–2	1–0	0–2	2–4	2–1	1–1	4–1	0–1		0–1
Walking Bout Company	3–3	3–0	2–0	2–1	2–1	2–2	3–3	2–1	6–1	

Source: FIFA.com
Legend: Blue = home team win; Yellow = draw; Red = away team win.

=== Positions by round ===
1st place
Championship group
Relegation group

Team ╲ Round	1	2	3	4	5	6	7	8	9	10	11	12	13	14	15	16	17	18
Walking Bout Company	1	1	1	1	1	1	1	1	1	1	2	1	1	1	1	1	1	1
Inter Moengotapoe	3	2	3	2	2	2	4	3	2	2	1	2	2	2	2	2	2	2
Transvaal	6	3	2	3	3	3	3	2	3	3	4	3	4	4	4	3	3	3
Leo Victor	7	4	6	5	5	5	2	4	4	4	3	4	3	3	3	4	4	4
Kamal Dewaker	8	6	9	8	10	10	9	8	7	8	8	6	6	6	6	6	5	5
Excelsior	4	8	10	10	8	8	6	6	6	5	5	5	5	5	5	5	6	6
Robinhood	9	9	8	7	6	6	7	9	10	10	9	7	8	7	7	7	7	7
Boskamp	5	8	4	6	9	9	10	10	9	7	7	9	9	9	8	9	10	8
Voorwaarts	2	7	5	4	4	4	5	5	5	6	6	8	7	8	9	8	8	9
The Brothers	10	10	9	9	7	7	8	7	8	9	10	10	10	10	10	10	9	10

Source: FIFA.com

== Second round ==
=== Championship group ===
Pos	Team	Pld	W	D	L	GF	GA	GD	Pts	Qualification	INT	WBC	LEO	EXC	TRA	KAM
1	Inter Moengotapoe (C)	10	7	1	2	21	10	+11	22	Qualification for 2012 CFU Club Championship		1–0	2–1	2–1	1–1	3–1
2	Walking Bout Company	10	6	0	4	20	14	+6	18		4–3		1–0	3–2	1–2	5–0
3	Leo Victor	10	5	0	5	22	17	+5	15		0–2	3–2		7–0	3–1	2–1
4	Excelsior	10	5	0	5	17	27	−10	15		0–4	2–1	6–3		2–1	1–0
5	Transvaal	10	4	1	5	17	15	+2	13		1–3	1–2	1–0	5–0		1–2
6	Kamal Dewaker	10	2	0	8	8	22	−14	6		1–0	0–1	1–3	1–3	1–3	

Source: Standings: FIFA.com and Results: FIFA.com
Rules for classification: 1) points; 2) goal difference; 3) number of goals scored.
(C) Champions

=== Relegation group ===
Pos	Team	Pld	W	D	L	GF	GA	GD	Pts	Qualification or relegation	ROB	BOS	VOO	BRO
7	Robinhood	6	5	0	1	19	6	+13	12 (Note: Robinhood were docked 3 points.)			0–2	2–0	4–2
8	Boskamp	6	3	0	3	10	9	+1	9		1–2		1–2	4–2
9	Voorwaarts (Q)	6	2	1	3	9	15	−6	7	Hoofdklasse relegation play-off	1–5	2–0		3–3
10	The Brothers (R)	6	1	1	4	12	20	−8	4	Relegation to 2011–12 Eerste Klasse	0–6	1–2	4–1	

Source: Standings: FIFA.com and Results: FIFA.com
Rules for classification: 1) points; 2) goal difference; 3) number of goals scored.
(Q) Qualified for the phase indicated; (R) Relegated

== Related Competitions ==
=== CFU Club Championship ===
The 2009–10 Hoofdklasse champion and finalist were admitted into the subcontinental tournament, the 2011 CFU Club Championship. The two clubs were Inter Moengotapoe and Walking Bout Company respectively.

Inter was paired up against Guyanese champions, Milerock in the first round of the tournament. WBC faced off against the St. Lucian champions, Northern United All Stars. In the first round, Inter lost 3–2 on aggregate to Milerock, while WBC defeated Northern United 6–1 on aggregate.

Upon defeat Northern United, WBC took on defending CFU champions, Puerto Rico Islanders, in the second elimination round of the tournament. The first leg opted to be in favor of WBC, as they took a 1–0 lead in the match. However, at the tail end of the match, the Islanders drew level with WBC. On May 14, WBC took on the Islanders in Bayamon, Puerto Rico, and ended their Champions League hopes with a 7–0 defeat. Still, WBC advanced the furthest in modern-day CONCACAF history to date.

=== CONCACAF Champions League ===
WBC and Leo Victor came close to qualifying for the Champions League, but fell short in the second round. WBC and Inter Moengo could have qualified for the 2011–12 CONCACAF Champions League by finishing in the top three of the 2011 CFU Club Championship, however they did not do so.
