= 2011–12 SVB Hoofdklasse =

Hoofdklasse
- Season: 2011–12
- Champions: SV Robinhood
- Top goalscorer: (Suriname) Ulrich Reding (Suriname) Giovanni Waal (20 goals each)

The 2011–12 Surinamese Hoofdklasse will be the 79th season of the Surinamese Hoofdklasse, the highest football league competition of Suriname. The season will begin in either October or November 2011, and conclude in July 2012. Walking Bout Company are the defending regular stage champions, while Inter Moengotapoe are the defending playoff stage champions.

== Changes from 2010–11 ==
- The Brothers will be relegated to the Eerste Klasse.
- Notch was promoted to the Hoofdklasse as Eerste Klasse champions.
- Voorwaarts defeated Takdier Boys in the promotion-relegation playoff by a 6–2 aggregate score, allowing the club to remain in the top flight of Surinamese football.

== Personnel and sponsoring ==
Note: Flags indicate national team as has been defined under FIFA eligibility rules. Players and Managers may hold more than one non-FIFA nationality.

| Team | Manager^{1} | Captain | Kit manufacturer | Shirt sponsor |
|---|---|---|---|---|
| Boskamp | (Suriname) Ricardo Lanveld | (Suriname) Ulrich Reding | Diadora | |
| Excelsior | | | Umbro | Digicel |
| Inter Moengotapoe | (Suriname) Eduard Redjosentono | (Suriname) Jerome Strijder | Jako | Brunswijkorporate |
| Kamal Dewaker | | | Umbro | |
| Leo Victor | | (Suriname) Faizel Hoogdorp | Umbro | Coca-Cola |
| Notch | | | | |
| Robinhood | (Suriname) Arno Burleson | (Guyana) Richard Reynolds | Adidas | Staatoue |
| Transvaal | (Suriname) William Bundel | | Joma | Enfinity |
| Voorwaarts | | (Netherlands) Ruiz Kromorejo | Legea | Guinness |
| Walking Bout Company | (Suriname) Jimmy Hoepel | (Suriname) Johannes Asaimi | Adidas | Digicel |

== Regular season ==
=== League table ===
| Pos | Team | Pld | W | D | L | GF | GA | GD | Pts | Qualification |
|---|---|---|---|---|---|---|---|---|---|---|
| 1 | Robinhood (C) | 27 | 19 | 4 | 4 | 75 | 29 | +46 | 61 | Champions |
| 2 | Inter Moengotapoe | 27 | 13 | 11 | 3 | 56 | 32 | +24 | 50 | |
| 3 | Walking Bout Company | 27 | 15 | 3 | 9 | 55 | 44 | +11 | 48 | |
| 4 | Leo Victor | 27 | 14 | 4 | 9 | 49 | 40 | +9 | 46 | |
| 5 | Transvaal | 27 | 11 | 9 | 7 | 38 | 28 | +10 | 42 | |
| 6 | Boskamp | 27 | 9 | 4 | 14 | 49 | 62 | −13 | 31 | |
| 7 | Notch | 27 | 8 | 6 | 13 | 37 | 56 | −19 | 30 | |
| 8 | Excelsior | 27 | 8 | 5 | 14 | 41 | 58 | −17 | 29 | |
| 9 | Voorwaarts (R) | 27 | 8 | 3 | 16 | 38 | 54 | −16 | 27 | Relegation playoff |
| 10 | Kamal Dewaker (R) | 27 | 4 | 3 | 20 | 19 | 54 | −35 | 15 | Relegated |

Source: RSSSF
Rules for classification: 1) points; 2) goal difference; 3) number of goals scored.
(C) Champions; (R) Relegated

== Relegation playoff ==
| Team 1 | Score | Team 2 |
|---|---|---|
| Randjiet Boys | 1–0 | Voorwaarts |
| Voorwaarts | 1–1 | Randjiet Boys |

- Randjiet Boys promoted and Voorwaarts relegated.

== Related competitions ==
=== CFU Club Championship ===
As winners of the 2010–11 Hoofdklasse second round playoffs, Inter Moengotapoe and SV Transvaal earned berths into the CFU Club Championship for 2012.

=== CONCACAF Champions League ===
Should Inter Moengo or Walking Bout Company finish in third place or higher in the CFU Club Championship, they would earn a preliminary berth into the 2012–13 CONCACAF Champions League. If either team qualifies, it would be the first time since 1998 that a Surinamese club qualified for a CONCACAF competition, as well as the first time a Surinamese club ever made it into the Champions League.
