= Groningen (disambiguation) =

Groningen is a city in the Netherlands.

Groningen may also refer to:

== Places ==
- Groningen (province), a province of the Netherlands of which Groningen is the capital city
- Lordship of Groningen, the name under which the province was ruled by the Habsburg between 1536 and 1594
- Groningen gas field, a natural gas field in province of Groningen
- Groningen, Suriname, a town in the Saramacca District, Suriname
- Groningen, Minnesota, an unincorporated community in Minnesota, United States
- Gröningen, a town in Saxony-Anhalt, Germany
- Grøningen, a Norwegian lake

== Other uses ==
- Groningen (cattle), a breed of dairy cattle
- Gronings dialect, the Dutch language dialect spoken in Groningen
- FC Groningen, the football club from Groningen, the Netherlands
- HNLMS Groningen, several ships of the Dutch navy
- University of Groningen, Netherlands
- Groningen Protocol, a medical protocol
