= 2010–11 Surinamese Eerste Klasse =

The 2010–11 Surinamese Eerste Klasse is a season of second-tier association football in Suriname.

== Changes from 2009– 10 ==
- Jai Hanuman and FCS Nacional were relegated from the Hoofdklasse
- Kamal Dewaker and The Brothers were promoted to the Hoofdklasse

== Competition table ==
The current club standings as of 22 March

Pos	Team	Pld	W	D	L	GF	GA	GD	Pts	Qualification or relegation
1	Notch	20	15	1	4	45	19	+26	46	Qualification for 2011–12 Surinamese Hoofdklasse
2	Takdier Boys	20	14	2	4	45	26	+19	44	Qualification for Promotion playoffs
3	Randjiet Boys	20	14	1	5	59	26	+33	43	
4	Boma Star	20	13	3	4	49	27	+22	42	
5	SNL	20	11	2	7	49	28	+21	35	
6	Tammenga	20	8	1	11	41	60	−19	25	
7	De Ster	20	8	0	12	30	47	−17	24	
8	Inter Rica	20	6	4	10	37	42	−5	22	
9	Nacional	20	6	3	11	40	51	−11	21	
10	Real Saramacca	20	6	3	11	28	40	−12	21	Qualification for Relegation playoffs
11	Jai Hanuman (R)	20	3	5	12	30	41	−11	14	Relegation to 2011–12 Randdistrictentoernooi
12	Fortuna 75 (R)	20	2	3	15	20	66	−46	9	Relegation to 2011–12 Randdistrictentoernooi

Updated to match(es) played on 9 May 2011. Source: Soccerway
Rules for classification: 1) points; 2) goal difference; 3) number of goals scored.
(R) Relegated
