= HNLMS Groningen =

HNLMS Groningen (Dutch: Hr.Ms. or Zr.Ms. Groningen) may refer to the following ships of the Royal Netherlands Navy:

- HNLMS Groningen (1857), a Groningen-class corvette launched in 1857 and decommissioned in 1863
- HNLMS Groningen (D813), a Friesland-class destroyer launched in 1954 and sold to Peru as BAP Galvez in 1980
- HNLMS Groningen (P843), a Holland-class offshore patrol vessel launched in 2011
