= Andy Atmodimedjo =

Surinamese footballer and manager

Personal information
- Full name: Andy Jozua Atmodimedjo
- Date of birth: 16 March 1967 (age 59)
- Place of birth: Paramaribo, Surinam
- Position: Defender

Team information
- Current team: Puwa Nani (manager)

Youth career
- 1975–1980: Fajalobi
- 1980–1982: Tuna
- 1982–1985: Producers

Senior career*
Years	Team	Apps	(Gls)
1985–1986	Producers		
1986–1994	Robinhood		

International career^{‡}
1983	Suriname U20	4	(0)

Managerial career
- 1997–2000: Puwa Nani
- 2003–2004: Robinhood
- 2003–2005: WBC
- 2004: Suriname
- 2005–2007: Super Red Eagles
- 2006–2007: Suriname U20
- 2007–2008: FCS Nacional
- 2008–2009: Boskamp
- 2010–2011: WBC (assistant)
- 2011: Puwa Nani
- 2016–2017: IMT
- * Club domestic league appearances and goals as of (20:33, 11 January 2016 (UTC)) ‡ National team caps and goals as of (20:33, 11 January 2016 (UTC))

Andy Jozua Atmodimedjo (born 16 March 1967) is a Surinamese football manager and former player, who is currently the manager of Inter Moengotapoe. He spent most of his professional playing career with S.V. Robinhood, winning four Hoofdklasse titles. He had previously played for Producers in the Hoofdklasse before joining Robinhood in 1986.

After retiring from playing, he went into management with Puwa Nani, followed by spells with S.V. Robinhood, WBC, Super Red Eagles, FCS Nacional, SV Boskamp, before returning to Puwa Nani in 2011. He has also managed the Suriname senior team and the under-21 team in the past.

== Club career ==
Born in Paramaribo, Suriname, Atmodimedjo began his playing career in the youth ranks of Fajalobi, where he played until 1980. That year he transferred to Tuna, where he played for two seasons, before joining Producers from Pontbuiten. In 1982, Atmodimedjo joined the youth of Producers, before making his Hoofdklasse debut in 1985. He would join S.V. Robinhood after only one season with the club, while also taking his first coaching position with Celtic U-20 competing in the SVCB Randdistrict. In 1986, he joined S.V. Robinhood, where he would play for the remainder of his career. He helped Robinhood win four titles in nine seasons with the club.

== International career ==
Atmodimedjo played in the youth ranks of the Suriname national team. He played for the under-20 team that made third place at the 1983 CFU Youth Championship. Having played on various youth levels, he never made any appearances for the senior team.

== Managerial career ==
Atmodimedjo took his first coaching position as a player of Robinhood, coaching the youth teams of Celtic. In 1997, he took the managerial position with Randdistrict club Puwa Nani, where he would coach for four seasons. In 2003, he took an apprenticeship with Dutch club AFC Ajax. In the meantime he graduated from the KNVB International Coaching Course in the Netherlands, returning to Suriname and taking a coaching position with his former club S.V. Robinhood as well as Walking Boyz Company. Atmodimedjo helped WBC to win the league title and the Suriname President's Cup in 2004. The year in which he was made the interim manager of the Suriname national team.

In 2005, he managed the Super Red Eagles in the Hoofdklasse, while managing the national under-20 team a year later at the same time. In 2007, he became the manager of FCS Nacional and then SV Boskamp a year later, before returning to Walking Boyz Company. In 2011, he resigned as manager, returning to Puwa Nani, competing in the SCVB Randdistrict but did not stay there for long. After nearly five years he signed a contract to be a coach once again, this time with Inter Moengotapoe (IMT). He will be the new manager of the eight time Hoofdklasse champions which will begin in the 2017 season. He signed with IMT because of their intentions of going to the CONCACAF Champions League.

As of 2023, Atmodimedjo is the manager of the National Soccer Academy (NSA) in Wanica.

== Honours ==
=== Player ===
Robinhood

- SVB Hoofdklasse: 1987, 1988, 1989, 1993

Suriname U20

- CFU Youth Championship third place: 1983

=== Manager ===
Walking Boyz Company

- SVB Hoofdklasse: 2004
- Suriname President's Cup: 2004
