= S.V. Boskamp =

Surinamese football club

Boskamp
- Full name: Sport Vereniging Boskamp
- Founded: 2 February 1998; 27 years ago
- Ground: J. Eliazer Stadion; Groningen, Suriname
- Capacity: 1,250
- Owner: R.Wirjomadi
- Chairman: H.Rusland
- Manager: Roy Hasselbaink
- League: Hoofdklasse
- 2011–12: 5th
Home colours

SV Boskamp is a Surinamese football club based in Groningen, Saramacca District. The club plays in the Surinamese Hoofdklasse, the top tier of football in the nation. The club was founded on February 2, 1998.

== Current squad 2011–12 ==
Note: Flags indicate national team as defined under FIFA eligibility rules; some limited exceptions apply. Players may hold more than one non-FIFA nationality.

No.	Pos.	Nation	Player
—	DF	(Suriname) SUR	Malcolm Weibolt

== Notable former coaches ==
- (Suriname) Andy Atmodimedjo (2008–09)
- (Suriname) Roy Hasselbaink (2011–)
