= Nacionello Stadion =

Football stadium in Suriname

- Interactive map of Nacionello Stadion
- Location: Houttuin, Suriname
- Coordinates: 5°43′25.6″N 55°12′01″W
- Owner: FCS Nacional
- Operator: Stichting Nacionello Beheer
- Capacity: 1,500
- Surface: Grass

Construction
- Opened: 11 January 2003

Tenants
- FCS Nacional (2003–2013); Nacional Deva Boys (2013–)

Nacionello Stadion is an association football stadium in Houttuin, Wanica District, Suriname. It is home to SVB Eerste Klasse club FCS Nacional. The stadium was built in 2003 and seats 1,500 people

== Location ==
The Nacionello Stadium is located in Houttuin, Wanica District on the Tout Lui Fautkanaalweg 7 as part of the Sportcomplex Nacionello.

== History ==
Founded by the Stichting Nacionello Beheer and financed by Hermant Bobby Jaikaran, jr., the former chairman of Surinamese football club FCS Nacional. The stadium was opened on 11 January 2003. Aside from the main pitch and stadium, there are two additional pitches located on the property as part of the sportcomplex. The property was purchased and developed by the Stichting Nacionello Beheer, without the aid of any of the national sports associations in the country.
