= Surabaya Wooden Dock of 1,100 tons =

Floating dry dock of the Dutch East Indies

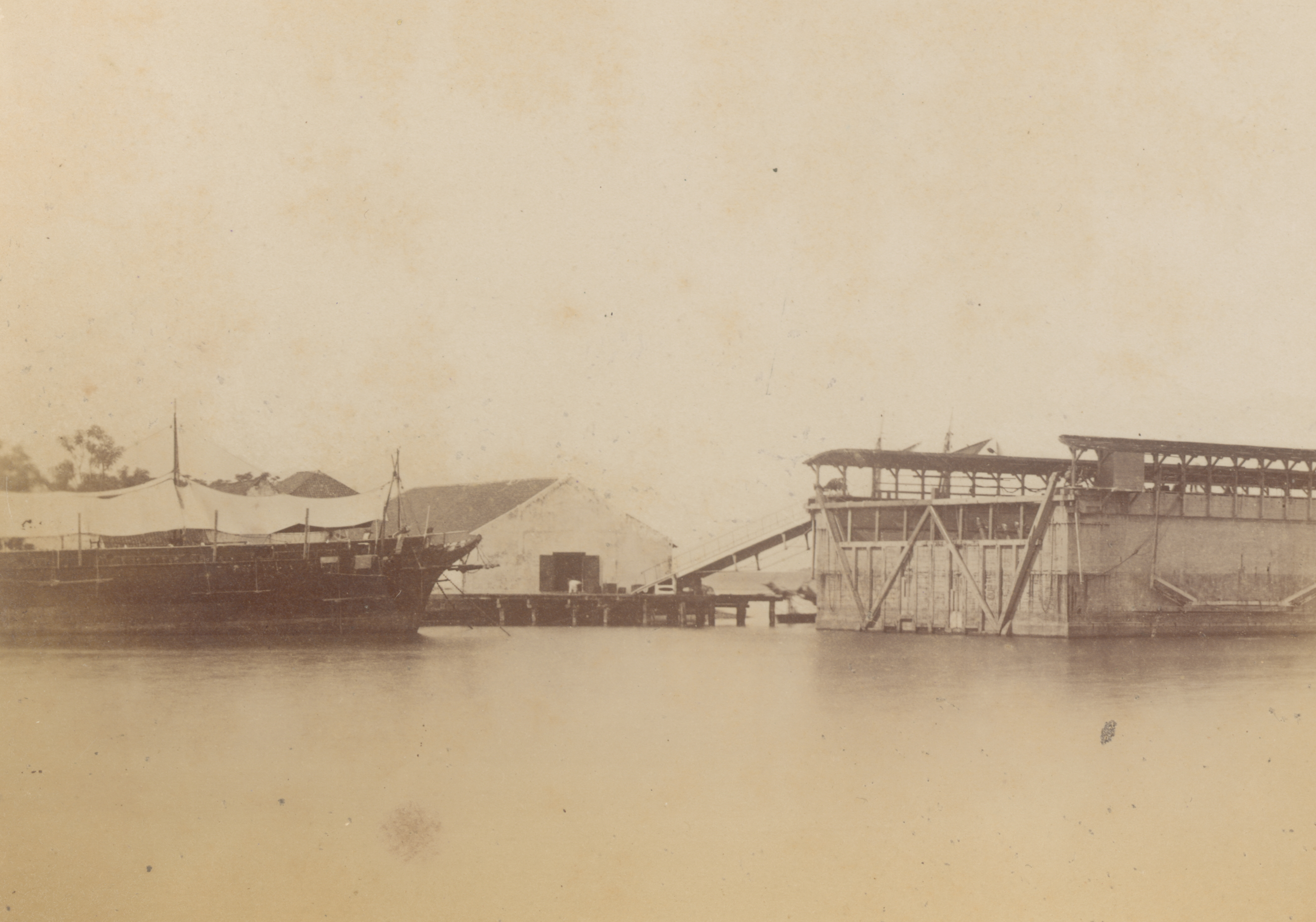
- A wooden dry dock in Surabaya, most probably Surabaya wooden dock of 1,100 tons

History

Netherlands
- Name: Surabaya Wooden Dock of 1,100 tons
- Laid down: March 1847
- Launched: 2 June 1848
- Commissioned: 6 October 1849
- Decommissioned: April 1881
- Out of service: ?
- Stricken: 16 April 1881
- Home port: Surabaya, 7.202023°S 112.738993°E

General characteristics (as completed)
- Length: 64.00 m (210.0 ft)
- Beam: 20.00 m (65.6 ft)
- Draft: 1.20 m (3.9 ft) (empty)
- Depth of hold: 7.50 m (24.6 ft) (height)

Surabaya Wooden Dock of 1,100 tons was the first floating dry dock of the Dutch East Indies.

== Context ==
Surabaya is on Madura Strait at the mouth of the Kali Mas river. By nature, Surabaya offers safe anchorage for ships. I.e. ships can safely anchor off the coast, so boats can communicate with the city proper. The good connections to the interior that the river provided made Surabaya a good location for a harbor. In the mid-1830s, the Dutch Navy decided to locate her main base in the Indies at Surabaya. In the 1840s this led to the construction of the navy base called 'Maritime Establishment' (Dutch: Maritiem Etablissement) just east of the river. The modern commercial harbor known as Port of Tanjung Perak (Dutch: Tandjong Perak) was constructed west of the river in the 1910s.

Construction of the Maritime Establishment started in July 1846. The base consisted of a wet dock, all kinds of repair-, storage- and provisioning facilities, and a dry dock. The wet dock, called 'Bassin' was the center of the base. The Bassin was a place where ships could attach to a quay. The big advantage of this was that for works on a ship, men and materiel did not have to be transported to the ship, but were close at hand.

In the early nineteenth century, some developments led to an urgent need for a dry dock in the Dutch East Indies. The size and length of ships made them ever more vulnerable to some of the undesired effects of careening. The practice of coppering ships made them more economical, but careening was very bad for the copper sheathing. Therefore the required regular inspection could only be done in a dry dock. Steam paddle ships could only be careened after removal of the machinery and wheels, making regular inspection very costly. For screw steam ships the risk of damaging the propeller shaft was too high to careen them. The absence of a dry dock led to the early loss of several ships of the Dutch navy. Ships that could have been repaired on time if a dry dock had been at hand.

A first attempt to realize a dry dock was the construction of a graving dock at Onrust Island. It started in 1841. This first attempt at Onrust lasted till 1844, when so many lives had been lost to malaria that the attempt was stopped. In Surabaya construction of a graving dock was clearly not possible because of the alluvial grounds. At the time, building a floating dry dock was the only option in Surabaya.

== Design and Ordering ==
=== Direct ancestors of Surabaya dock of 1,100 tons ===
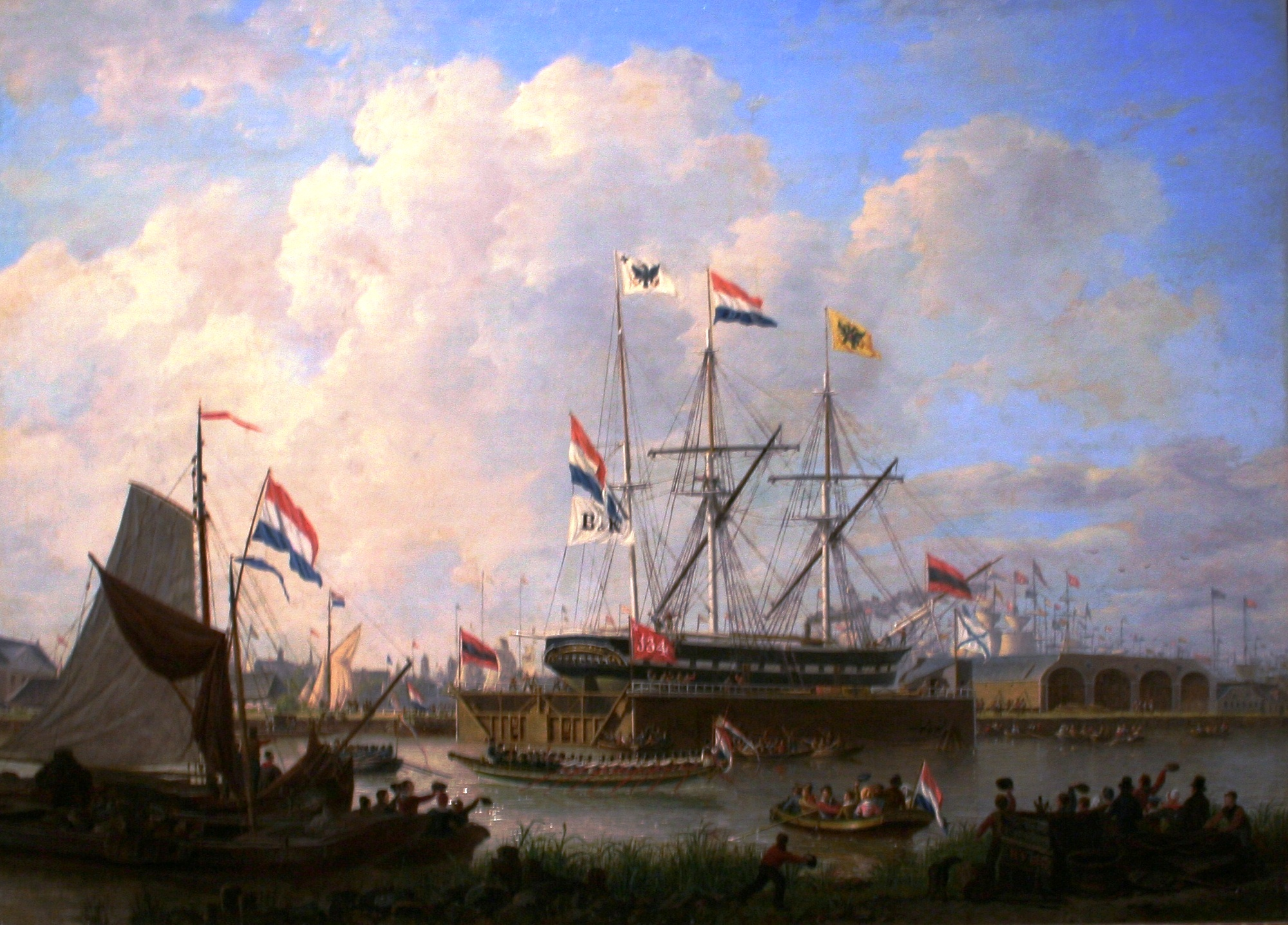
The first Amsterdam dock in 1843

In the Netherlands Amsterdam was in almost the same situation as Surabaya. It wanted to have a dry dock, but had a problem with the weak grounds of the city. Houses could be supported by driving piles till they hit solid ground, but this was no solution for the massive pressures that a graving dock faced. When the first modern floating dry dock started to operate in New York in 1839-1840, it got the attention of Jan Daniel Diets. He bought the plans of the American floating dry dock, and soon Amsterdam Wooden Drydock I was put into use on 30 November 1842, lifting the frigate Koning Willem II of 39.6 m length, 11 m beam and 3.6 m draught and about 800 tons, belonging to J.P. Janette Walen. The tons mentioned here were indeed Dutch weight tons, i.e. metric tonnes, not tons that relate to the cargo capacity of the ship.

The first Amsterdam dock was immediately successful, and soon docked ships of over 1,000 tons. It gave rise to a habit of inspecting coppered ships before every long voyage. Some people from Le Havre visited Amsterdam in 1843 to see the dock in action. They then ordered Diets to supply the wood for a floating dry dock of 212 Amsterdam feet (28.3133 cm) length (60 m). Soon there was a rumor that the shipping magnates that operated the Amsterdam drydock would operate an equivalent drydock in Surabaya.

Diets would build two more drydocks in Amsterdam. All Amsterdam drydocks were just below 50 m long. At the time, the Noordhollandsch Kanaal was the only deep water connection from Amsterdam to the sea. Willem I Lock was Amsterdam's only connection to the canal. At the time the length of the lock chamber not bothered by the gates was 56.86 m. Sailing ships had bowsprits that were allowed to stick out significantly over the front of the Amsterdam dry dock (see the painting), but extremities could not stick out over the lock gates of Willem I lock. This explains the difference in length between the Amsterdam drydocks and the lock. In Le Havre such an economic limit to the length of the dock did not exist, and so the Havre Dock was much longer at 64 m. For Surabaya, this size limit was also not applicable, and like the dry dock in Le Havre, it would operate in salt water.

=== Ordering ===
The Dutch government ordered her chief engineer P. Schuyt to visit Le Havre. He was to investigate the changes that the French had made for their drydock. If he approved of them, these changes should also be applied to the new drydock for Surabaya. The measures were also given by Diets, making him the designer of the dock.

=== Naming ===
At the time Surabaya Wooden Dock of 1,100 tons was simply known as the Surabaya dry dock, or Surabaya floating dry dock (Dutch: drijfdok). The labels "wooden" and "1,100 tons" were added later. At the time of her construction, all floating dry docks were made of wood. For the Dutch, this changed when Onrust Dock of 3,000 tons became operational in 1869. The other wooden drydock in the Dutch East Indies was Onrust Wooden Dock of 1,300 tons.

After the iron Onrust Dock of 3,000 tons arrived at Onrust, Onrust Wooden Dock of 1,300 tons was moved from Onrust to Surabaya. It made that both wooden docks were then in Surabaya, and had to be kept apart by labels like 'big' and 'small', or 'old' and 'new'. Things then got messy when people talked about the big wooden dock because Surabaya Wooden Dock of 1,100 tons was big, or about the 'Surabaya Dock' because Onrust Wooden Dock of 1,300 tons happened to be stationed in Surabaya. In 1909 somebody used the lift capacity to keep the wooden docks apart.

== Construction ==
=== Constructed together with the Maritime Establishment ===
Surabaya wooden dock of 1,100 tons was constructed at the same time that the Maritime Establishment, the Dutch navy base at Surabaya, was built. The reason is that the announcement that parts of the drydock were to be sent from the Netherlands, forced the authorities to choose a plan for the establishment, and to implement it. In September 1846 the first parts of the dock arrived in Surabaya. Work on the terrain where it was to be constructed then started, as well as work on other facilities for storage of parts and construction of the drydock. Commander C. Tinneveld was actually responsible for assembling the dock. The official head of the project was Captain Velsberg. In March 1847 construction of the basin and dockpit started.

The first shipment of the dock arrived in Batavia on 3 September 1846 on board Prins Frederik der Nederlanden. On 24 September 1846 Prins Frederik der Nederlanden arrived in Surabaya. The second shipment of dock parts was sent on board the frigate Koning der Nederlanden captain J.W. Retgers of 807 ton. On 7 September 1846 at 2:30 pm she was beached on a coral reef near Pulau Dapur (an island north of Batavia). She struck the reef with such force that within a few hours there was 5 feet of water inside the ship. Part of the cargo was saved, but the ship was lost. On 27 September 1846 the ship Vlashandel Captain P.L. Dupain arrived in Batavia with part of the dock.

The government decision to send European wood from the Netherlands to Surabaya would later attract a lot of criticism. In fact, it was not so strange if one considers that the same procedure was followed in Le Havre, and that the Pine and other timber from Narva obviously functioned quite well over there. The added advantage was that the risk of errors on the new shipyard in Surabaya would be less. Engineer Oordt inspected the parts before they were sent. Soon the shipyard found that the European timber which had already been used could not resist the local climate, or only for a very short time. The shipyard decided to use local teak for the parts of the dock that would be submerged, as well as for the beams on the surface (replacing the Narva beams). The rest of the European timber was used to create a floor in the dock pit, as well as for many other uses on the base.

In June 1847 construction of the dry dock started. Judging from the above false start with only European timber, this was probably a restart of construction. The plans for construction were loosely followed. A big difference was that the local shipbuilders thought that the drydock would last longer because of the use of teak. Therefore they made the construction more solid, e.g. by applying cross beams on the sides.

On 2 June 1848 the bottom of the drydock, which was basically a raft, was 'launched'. That is, some water was let into the pit, and when the bottom was afloat, all support was removed. The water was then pumped out, and the coppered bottom of the drydock rested on the floor of the dockpit. On 6 August 1849 Surabaya wooden dock of 1,100 tons was moored in the basin. On 6 October 1849 the screw steamer Samarang was the first ship to use the dock.

== Characteristics ==
=== General characteristics ===
Wooden floating dry docks were very different from iron docks. The main difference is that wooden drydocks were basically rafts that were lowered by pumping water in and out of the superstructure on the sides. Once the sides were empty the natural flotation power of the raft kicked in. Engineer Oordt gave a description of the third floating dry dock in Amsterdam, and claimed that apart from the dimensions the docks of Le Havre and Surabaya were the same.

=== Raft and sides ===
The bottom of the dock was a raft. According to the plan it was to be made of pine planks that were 60 cm longer than the total beam of the dock, so they would not split from nails and bolts. The thickness of the planks was to be 30 cm. The planks were made out of so-called 70 feet pines, which were 52–56 cm wide in the middle. These planks were placed alternating, so the end of a plank that came from the top of a tree, would be next to the end of a plank that came from the bottom of a tree. All this was fixed together with small timber. Over this bottom came a pine floor. The planks of the floor were 28 cm wide and 20 cm thick. The length of these planks varied from 10–20 m. The openings between these planks were 3 cm wide, starting 11 cm from the top, and were filled with moss. On the surface, the seams were caulked shut. A third layer of 31-cm-thick planks was laid on top of this, in the same direction as the pines of the first layer. Water that came between these layers was led to the pumps, so it would not make the floor of the dock wet. On top of the first layer, was placed a watertight rectangle of 30 cm wide, which protected the 2nd and 3rd layers. For the Surabaya dock the raft was constructed a bit differently. It was more compact and it was coppered, both measures to keep out shipworms.

From the outside of the raft the sides went up straight. For this Narva beams of 28 by 30 cm were used (Dutch: Nerva Balken), obviously a special kind of wood. On the outside these were straightened in order to be able to attach the planks on the exterior. On the inside these beams were left rough. On the inside of the dock these Narva beams went up from the floor with angle of about 56 degrees. This is how the water 'chests' were formed. Near the stern of the dock the diagonal beams were made somewhat thicker and made of oak. Up till about 1 m above the raft, the dock was made watertight with 20 -cm-thick planks. Further above, the planks were made of scots pine and diminished to 19 and 8 cm thickness. Oordt noted that the dock was so watertight that a ship once docked for 19 days without the dock having to use the pumps. Again, Surabaya wooden dock of 1,100 tons followed this design, but differed in details.

On the inside, the sides or chests were divided into four compartments each. In the bow was a box called "pump head" where pumps were placed at 2.40 m above the floor of the dock. Water could be pumped out of the rear compartments separately. Water could flow from the compartments into the dock and vice versa. The openings regulated by valves. Water could also flow from the outside to the compartments. These openings could be closed by a wooden plug. At the stern, the dry dock had a large trapezium form door. In this door were two openings of 55 cm square. One was at the bottom, the other 60 cm higher. This higher opening was used to get goods in and out. It was noted that even with the heaviest ships, the water on the outside was never so high.

=== Operation ===
The dock, or rather the raft, was brought below the waterline by adding ballast to the sides. I.e. in the water compartments. After a ship had been brought into the dock, the door was closed. Next, the communication between the outside water and the compartments was closed off, and the communication between the compartments and the pumps opened. The pumps then emptied the compartments, making that the dock rose, and most water inside the dock flowed off via the door. This continued till the lower, watertight part, of the door started to get above water. Next the communication between the compartments and the inside of the dock was opened, so the pumps could pump out the remaining water.

The height of the water above the raft, that the door had to keep out was not that much. For the average big Dutch ship of 600-ton displacement, it was only 21 cm above the floor of the dock. For smaller ships, the door could even be reopened after they had been lifted. For contemporary frigates Oordt thought that the water would stay 80–90 cm above the raft of a suitable wooden dry dock.

=== Machinery ===
There were 6 pumps of 56 cm diameter with a stroke of 45.7 cm, making 50 strokes a minute. Of course this speed was dependent on the power of the steam engines, which were high pressure ones. Indeed the third Amsterdam dock lifted one of the biggest Dutch commercial ships in 90 minutes.

=== Dimensions ===
Surabaya dock had a length of 64 m, a beam of 20 m, was 7.5 m high and had a draft of 1.20 m. The draft of 1.20 m was an 'empty' draft, the dock would get lower by letting water into the sides. The dimensions of Surabaya dock did differ slightly from that of Le Havre, as it was 50 cm wider and higher, but was 10 cm higher in the water when empty. The lift capacity of Surabaya Wooden Dock of 1,100 tons was actually 1,150 metric tons.

=== Picture ===
There is at least one picture of a wooden floating drydock in the Dutch East Indies. The big question is whether this is Surabaya Wooden Dock of 1,100 tons or Onrust Wooden Dock of 1,300 tons. All the information that the Surabaya Dock was the same as the Le Havre dock (above), and the likeness between the picture and that of Le Havre Dock suggests that the picture is a picture of Surabaya Wooden Dock of 1,100 tons, but as long as there is no picture or drawing or other information that shows that Onrust Wooden Dock of 1,300 tons was different from Le Havre Dock, this proves nothing.

The author of the photograph is a more helpful clue. The institution that maintains the photograph provides the information that: 'P. Harting collected photographs for an album that he offered to D. de Wilde in 1877. The passing of photographer W.J. Olland, father in law of De Wilde, was the occasion.' Leiden University Libraries also states that W.J. Olland is the author of the photograph, and that it was made in Surabaya. W.J. Olland left Noordwijk in Batavia in 1862. He then set up shop in Surabaya in September 1862. This gave Olland ample opportunity to photograph Surabaya Wooden Dock.

The doubt is in whether Olland might have photographed Onrust Wooden Dock of 1,300 tons after it arrived in Surabaya for the first time on 23 November 1869. It is possible, and if the photograph can be dated exactly to these years, it might become likely because Surabaya Wooden Dock went into repairs till 1873 (cf. below). However, W.J. Olland had already moved back to Batavia by that time.

In September 1868 Olland had again opened a shop in Noordwijk, Batavia, trading in watches, clocks, microscopes, binoculars, glasses, etc. Therefore, when the photographer was in Surabaya, Surabaya Wooden Dock of 1,100 tons was present. When Onrust Wooden Dock of 1,300 tons arrived in Surabaya for the first time, the photographer had already left for Batavia. In July 1872 Olland and De Wilde left Java. Of course Olland might have traveled from Batavia to Surabaya while Onrust Wooden Dock of 1,300 tons was there, but at the time such a trip cost a lot of money.

== Service ==
=== First service period ===
Activity of Surabaya Wooden Dock 1849-1857
Year	Navy Ships	Merchants	Total
1849	4	0	4
1850	15 / 17	5 / 6	20 / 23
1851	? / 16	? /1	19 /17
1852	? / 13	? / 20	? / 33
1853	22	26	48
1854	17	32	49
1855	13	23	36
1856	16	15	31
1857	6	2	8

The first period of service of Surabaya wooden dock started on 7 October 1849 and lasted till mid-1857, seemingly without requiring special maintenance.

The first ship to use Surabaya wooden dock was HNLMS Samarang, the first screw steamer of the Dutch navy. The second ship was HNLMS Vesuvius, which would have been lost if it had not been docked. Next came the steam dredge boat of Surabaya port. She was followed by the schooner Niobe and the sailing corvette HNLMS Boreas (1833) of 776 t. In 1850 the corvette HNLMS Argo of 900 t necessitated a temporary move of the dock to a somewhat deeper part of the basin.

A complete list with the names of all ships that used the dock from 1849-1852 has survived. It shows that some ships visited the dock more than once in a year, which probably explains the difference between the number of ships that visited the drydock according to De Waal, and the numbers from this list. As shown when Argo docked, the drydock would need some time to reach her full capacity.

On 1 April 1855, Surabaya wooden dock performed a special feat: it lifted the light frigate HLNMS Prins Frederik (1840) of 44 guns and 1,461 t displacement. The official lift capacity of Surabaya wooden dock was only 1,150 tons, and the navy base was not yet completely ready. Therefore, the frigate was made much lighter in the harbor before Surabaya. The guns, excess anchors and chains, iron water boxes, the upper rigging and all other heavy stores were removed. On 26 March the frigate was brought into the basin. At that moment the stern still had a draught of 5.1 m. All other goods that were then unloaded diminished the draught further to 4.6 m. Meanwhile, the steam dredge had deepened the bottom of the basin under the drydock to 7.4 m under spring tide. On 1 April the docking of Prins Frederik took place somewhat a few days before spring tide. After Prins Frederik had been lifted the dock had a draft of 2.4 m at the bow and 2.04 m at the stern. After some minor repairs to the copper, a rotten plank and the keel, the ship exited the dock on 3 April, still before spring tide.

After the successful service on Prins Frederik there was a remark that if the dock could also service HNLMS Gedeh (1850) of 300 hp and 1,486 t displacement, it would have proven to be able to service all sail and steam ships that were part of the East Indies squadron. This was true with respect to emergency repairs or preventing the loss of ships that could not be safely repaired otherwise. With regard to taking full advantage of dry docks, it was not true. The efficiency of a drydock came from the speed with which it could service ships, whether for inspection, cleaning or maintenance. If a ship has to spend days getting lighter before it can be docked, the drydock is too small in an economic sense.

About mid 1857 Surabaya wooden dock was decommissioned for major maintenance. The commissioning of Onrust Wooden Dock in September 1856 probably had something to do with the timing of this maintenance. On 8 July 1857 Surabaya wooden dock was towed from Surabaya to Lassem by HNLMS Amsterdam. In Lassem / Rembang she would by put dry and receive maintenance, also on the parts below the waterline. This included the stripping all European wood from the dock and replacing it with local teak. The maintenance was complete in November 1858.

During the removal of some scots pine planks in the hold above the zetgang, these were found to be infested with shipworms (Teredo Navalis). They were 3 cm in diameter and 50–70 cm long. Two species were sent to the Physics Society of the Dutch East Indies together with a piece of wood they had dug into. It showed a needle-sized hole where the worm had entered, and a canal on the inside which steadily widened. It again showed how the worm could hit without being noticed.

=== Second service period ===
Activity of Surabaya Wooden Dock 1859-1869
Year	Navy Ships	Merchants	Total
1859	15	40	55
1860	13	7	20
1861	22	24	46
1862	19	11	30
1863	25	15	40
1864	23	11	34
1865	35 (inc. small vessels)	31	66
1866	34 (inc. small vessels)	28	62
1867	?	?	?
1868	19	5	24
1869	15	2	17

On 29 November 1858 Surabaya wooden dock arrived back before Surabaya, towed by HNLMS Merapi. A few hours later she was back in place in the basin. The second service period of Surabaya wooden dock of 1,100 tons lasted from December 1858 till 1869 or early 1870.

On 9 September 1861 the Screw Corvette HNLMS Groningen arrived in to Surabaya She was a new ship, commissioned in 1858, and displaced 1,457 t. She was also the lead ship and smallest ship of a ship type that was planned to become the mainstay of the Dutch navy in the far east. The so-called 'screw steamships second class', or steam corvettes.

Groningen obviously required repairs, because by October 1 she had been cleared of her rigging. This was probably done in order to dock her in Surabaya Wooden Dock. Later Tromp and Strootman said: Surabaya Wooden Dock serviced the screw steam ships second class (Groningen, Vice Admiraal Koopman, etc.) with many problems. Onrust Wooden Dock is longer, but still does not suffice for the current very long screw ships, and is also not suitable to receive loaded ships with high draft. It was the reason to build a larger third drydock for the Dutch East Indies.

The second service of Surabaya Wooden Dock was interrupted by a short, but major repair to her hull and boilers in 1862. After that Surabaya Wooden Dock continued in service while the first iron drydocks appeared. First Cores de Vries started construction of a major iron drydock for use in Surabaya, but that sank on first use. From 1863 the iron Onrust Dock of 3,000 tons was on order. When this iron drydock was put into service in 1869 it clearly outclassed the wooden docks.

The immediate effects of the appearance of the third (iron) drydock were not that spectacular. Due to the disappearance of sailing ships and the introduction of screw ships, the demand for drydock capacity was much higher than when Surabaya wooden dock was built. The third dock gave authorities the opportunity to move Onrust Wooden Dock to Surabaya, and to put Surabaya Wooden Dock in repair. Ideas to decommission the old dock had to wait.

=== Third service period ===
Docking days of Surabaya Wooden Dock 1873-1881
Year	State Ships	Merchants	Total
1873	?	?	?
1874	336	15	351
1875	256	66	322
1876	238	27	265
1877	?	?	?
1878	352	1	353
1879	256	24	280
1880	210	28	238
1881	58	0	58

In 1869 Surabaya Wooden Dock was indeed in urgent need of repairs when it was relieved by Onrust Wooden Dock. In 1870 the blocks in the dockpit were readied to receive Surabaya Wooden Dock of 1,100 tons. In 1871 the drydock was put on the blocks (Dutch: stapeling) for major repairs, which were seriously pressed. In 1872 these repairs continued with the same urgency. In October 1873 repairs to the 'old' wooden dock were finally finished, and she was put back into use.

After the 1871-1873 repairs it was clear that Surabaya Wooden Dock of 1,100 tons was old. She was labelled as 'aged', 'not worth any major repairs', and 'requiring much maintenance', but this was followed by 'of continuous useful service'.

The table of docking days shows that she was indeed of "continuous useful service". No wonder because a third element had been added to the demand for dock capacity. In the 1870s the Dutch navy shifted to iron ships, e.g. the Pontianak-class gunvessels. These had to be lifted twice a year, and the wooden docks were large enough to do this. In 1879 Surabaya Wooden Dock received new boilers, even though she continuously made a lot of water.

By the end of the 1870s activity of the dock seems to decline. Perhaps because her lifting capacity declined. Anyway, in her last few months of service, she still serviced for 58 docking days, but 42 of these applied to very light craft.

== The end ==
On 16 April 1881 Surabaya Wooden Dock of 1,100 tons, which continuously made a lot of water, was sold for break up. I.e. the buyer could not use it, but was obliged to break it up. Indeed the auction brought in 10,600 guilders. There were rumors that some Chinese were prepared to offer up to 75,000–80,000 guilders if they were allowed to use it at Madurawal. The government might have had multiple reasons to refuse this. The first might be the protection of companies which did invest in more modern material. The other was even more practical. The leaky dock was quite likely to sink, and then it could block shipping.
