= Clarence Seedorf Stadion =

Football stadium in Oost, Suriname

- Interactive map of Clarence Seedorf Stadion
- Location: Oost, Suriname
- Coordinates: 5°39′49″N 55°6′8″W
- Owner: Clarence Seedorf
- Operator: Future With Values (Fuwiva)
- Capacity: 3,500
- Surface: Grass

Construction
- Opened: 30 June 2001; 25 years ago
- Cost: €4 million

Tenants
- Suriprofs; The Brothers

Clarence Seedorf Stadium is a football stadium in Oost, Suriname. The stadium holds 3,500 and is the Surinamese home of Suriprofs, as well as the home stadium of S.V. The Brothers competing in the SVB Eerste Klasse. The driving force behind the stadium is Surinamese-Dutch International footballer Clarence Seedorf whom the stadium was named after.

== History ==
The stadium was built in Baka Para, on the property of the Seedorf family. It was built and intended as a gift to the society of Suriname. As one of the most modern stadiums in the country, Construction was completed in the Summer of 2001 at a production cost of roughly €4 million. The first match at the stadium was held on 30 June 2001 between S.V. Transvaal, national champions at the time, against Suriprofs.

=== Inaugural game ===
Date	Time (UTC-3)	Team 1	Res.	Team 2	Attendance
30 June 2006	16:30	(Suriname) Suriprofs	3 – 0	(Suriname) S.V. Transvaal	3,500

=== Junior league ===
A Junior league of the Para District is also contested at the Seedorf Stadium, a youth league which is created, organized and sponsored by Clarence Seedorf involving youth teams from the region. Both the Suriprofs, an unofficial team of professional Surinamese expatriates in Europe, as well as local side S.V. The Brothers share the grounds as their home stadium.

== Location ==
The Clarence Seedorf Stadion is situated on the Martin Luther Kingweg (known as the highway) in Oost, Para, approximately 23 km from the Capital Paramaribo.

== Miscellaneous ==
The canteen of the stadium is decorated with match worn shirts of Seedorf, from Ajax, Sampdoria, Real Madrid, Inter Milan, AC Milan and the Netherlands national football team.
