= V.V. Real Saramacca =

Surinamese football club

Real Saramacca
- Full name: Voetbal Vereniging Real Saramacca
- Ground: J. Eliazer Stadion; Groningen, Suriname
- Capacity: 1,000
Home colours

V.V. Real Saramacca is a Surinamese football club based in Saramacca District, Suriname. They compete in the Surinamese Eerste Klasse, the second-tier of Surinamese football. The team have previously played in the Hoofdklasse, the top-tier of football in Suriname.
