= J. Eliazer Stadion =

Football stadium in Suriname

- Interactive map of J. Eliazer Stadion
- Location: Groningen, Suriname
- Coordinates: 5°47′42″N 55°28′32″W
- Owner: District of Saramacca
- Operator: Saramacca Sport Bond
- Capacity: 1,000
- Surface: Grass

Construction
- Opened: 1946

Tenants
- Boskamp; Real Saramacca

J. Eliazer Stadion is an association football stadium in Groningen, Suriname. It is home to SVB Eerste Klasse clubs SV Boskamp and Real Saramacca. The stadium was built in 1949 and named after its founder Jacques Jean Eliazer. The stadium seats 1,000 people

== Location ==
The J. Eliazer Stadium is located in Groningen, Saramacca District on the Pannekoekstraat.
