= HNLMS Groningen (1857) =

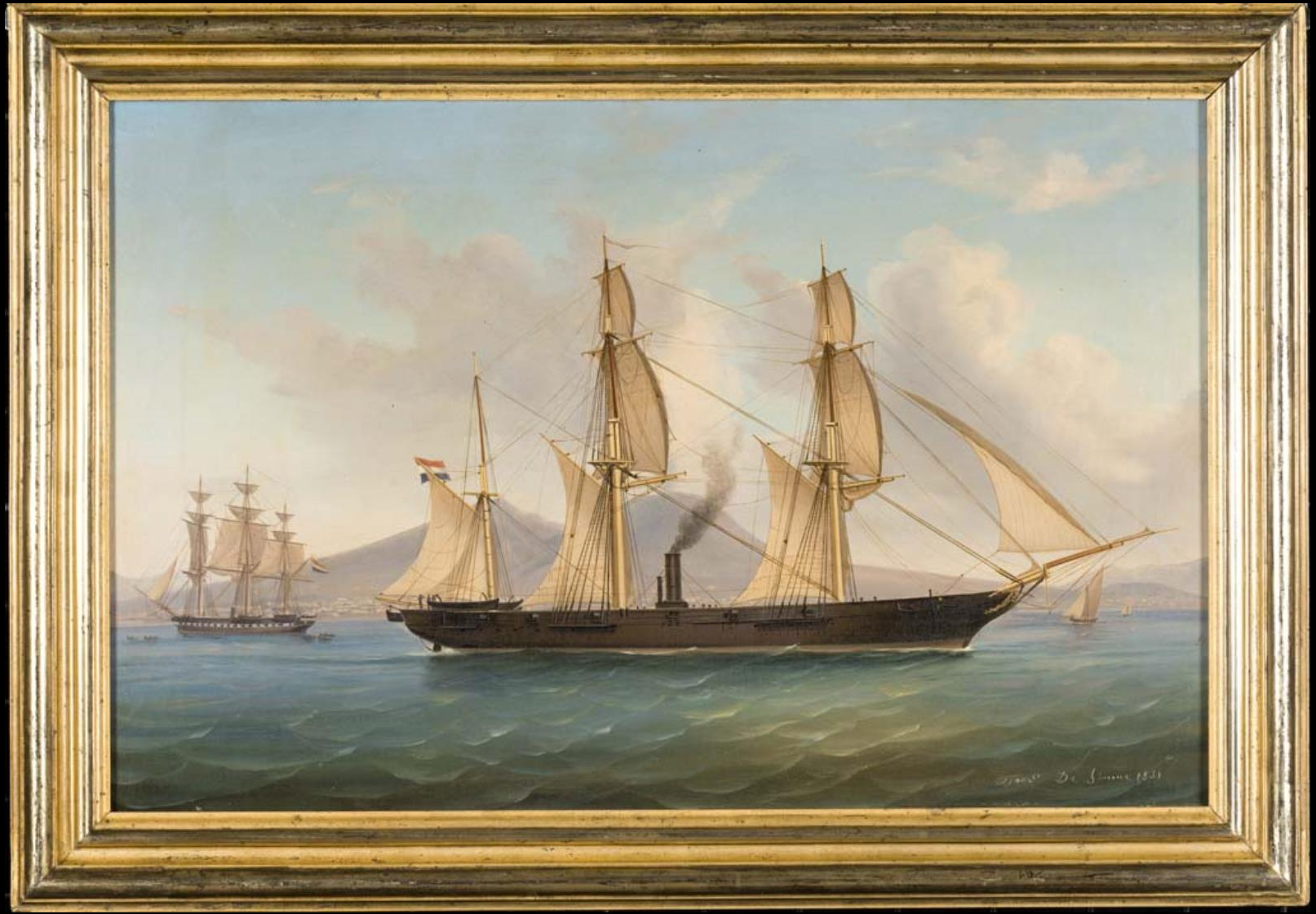
- Groningen in the Mediterranean 1857

History

Netherlands
- Name: Groningen
- Namesake: Groningen city
- Builder: Fop Smit, Kinderdijk
- Laid down: 1855
- Launched: 9 April 1857
- Commissioned: 1 July 1857
- Out of service: February 1863 unfit

General characteristics (as completed)
- Class & type: Groningen-class Steam Corvette
- Displacement: 1,457 long tons (1,480 t)
- Length: 58.82 m (193.0 ft)
- Beam: 10.74 m (35.2 ft)
- Draft: 5.00 m (16.4 ft)
- Installed power: 250 hp (190 kW)
- Speed: steam: 8.25 knots (15.28 km/h; 9.49 mph)
- Complement: To Japan: 185
- Armour: none

HNLMS Groningen was the lead ship of the Groningen class. She was one of the first Dutch purpose designed propeller driven warships, but was demolished after only 5 years of service.

== Construction ==
=== Built by a private shipyard ===
Groningen was constructed by the private shipyard Fop Smit in Slikkerveer / Kinderdijk. For the Netherlands this was exceptional, because since the French period (1794–1815), almost all warships had been built at state shipyards. These state shipyards Rijkswerven cost a lot of money. Many politicians thought that closing the state shipyards was a good way to economize. Their opponents claimed that warship construction was fundamentally different from merchant ship construction.

By 1850 there were only two state shipyards left. When the Dutch navy wanted to adapt screw propulsion in about 1852, these state shipyards could not handle the work. In 1855 Navy minister de Smit van den Broecke then dared to order some ships at private shipyards. By July 1855 he had ordered 'two ships of a completely new type' at Fijenoord shipyard. Fijenoord would build the engines herself, but was allowed to subcontract another shipyard.

It is not certain what De Smit van den Broecke meant with 'two ships of a completely new type'. He could have referred to two Bali-class sloops, or to one Bali-class sloop and Groningen.

=== Construction by Fop Smit ===
The main reason to contract with Fijenoord had been that the minister acknowledged that the machinery was the crucial aspect of a screw ship. On the other hand, Fijenoord herself only built iron ships. Therefore, Fijenoord subcontracted with Fop Smit, a famous shipyard that was also proficient in building wooden ships.

Groningen was laid down in 1855. She was launched on 9 April 1857 by the shipyard 'F. Smit at Slikkerveer'. This is a strange mention, because Fop Smit had his shipyard at Kinderdijk. Indeed, there was a Jan Smit Shipyard at Slikkerveer. It therefore seems that Jan Smit Shipyard was the actual builder of Groningen. This seems strange, but Jan Smit Slikkerveer actually launched multiple ships for Fop Smit, e.g. on 15 April 1858. Groningen was commissioned on 1 July 1857

On 28 December 1857 made a trial run, attained a speed of 8.25 knots. This is slow, but as she left for the East Indies on the 30th, this run was made while loaded. As such it is hard to compare with results of other trial runs, which were generally made with an empty ship.

== Service ==
=== To the Mediterranean with the Prince of Orange ===
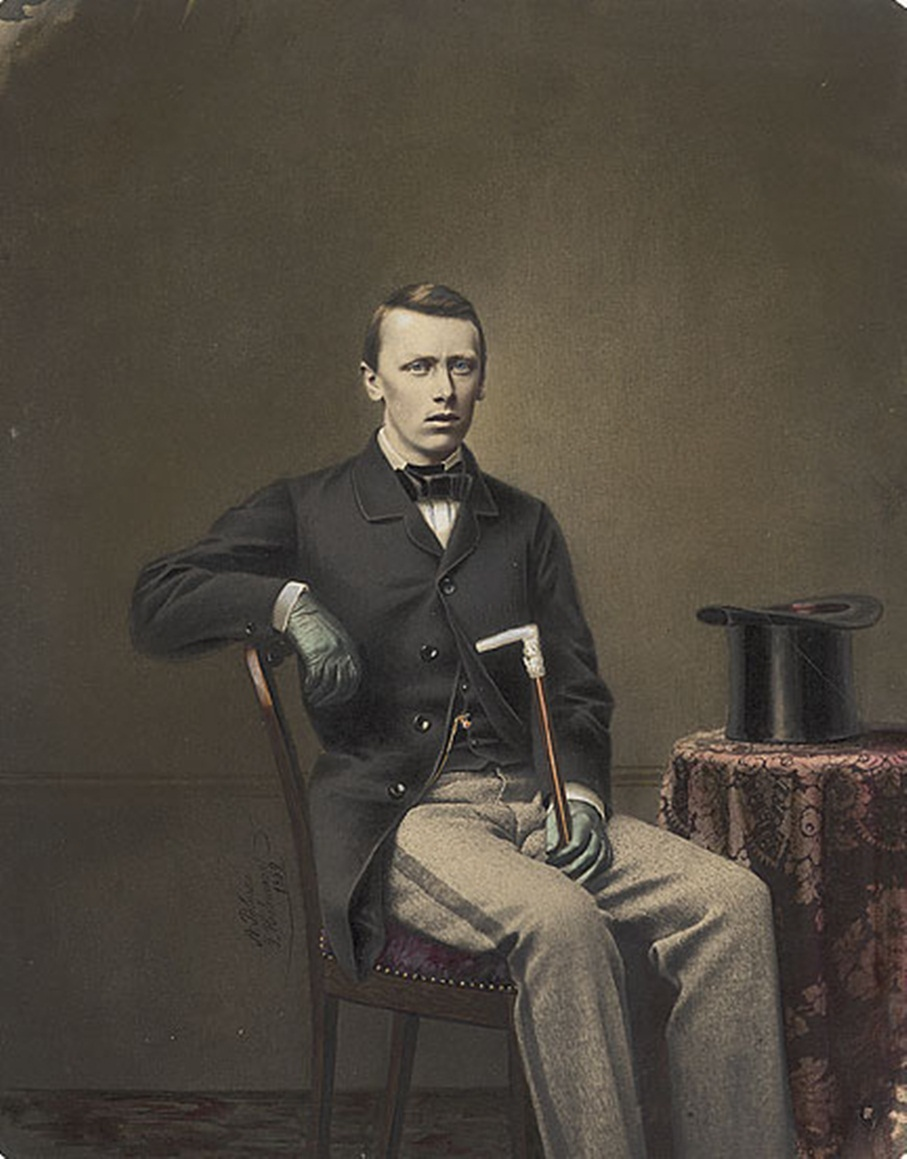
The Prince of Orange

On 27 July 1857 Groningen made a trial run on the Western Scheldt. On 30 July she was in Vlissingen and was ready for her first trip. The commanding officers were: Captain-Lt J.D. Wolterbeek, ADC Lieutenant F. de Casembroot, and D. Bowier, J.P.M. Willinck, J.D.J. van der Hegge Spies, L. Rautter, P.J. Losgert, H.J.E. van de Watering, J.H. Jullien, and scribe D.W. Muller. In the Mediterranean, Groningen would be accompanied by Wassenaar, which sailed from Texel.

On 30 July 1857 William, Prince of Orange (1840–1879) left The Hague by train, and with the royal steam yacht he arrived alongside Groningen at about 5 PM. William had with him his governor Lt-Colonel E.A.O. de Casembroot, Lieutenant K.W. de Kock, and W.C. Aylva van Pallandt. Therefore, the captain would occupy a temporary cabin that had been built on the deck. On 31 July the prince visited Vlissingen and its guard ship, and lunched with Vlissingen's naval commander VA H. Ferguson.

In the early hours of 1 August Groningen left Vlissingen for the Mediterranean. In the night of 1–2 August Groningen was on the latitude of Deal. Groningen then sailed a course between the Isle of Wight and the English coast.

On 5 August Cape Ortegal was sighted. On 6 August Groningen anchored in A Coruña. The local authorities were received on board. In the evening the prince visited the opera. On 8 August the prince and officers of Groningen visited a parade and dined in the city. In the evening the opera performed La sonnambula. Groningen continued her voyage on 9 August.

In the morning of 9 August Groningen crossed the bay and at about noon, she anchored before Ferrol. After the local authorities had visited Groningen, the Prince went ashore in the afternoon. On 10 August the prince visited the Reales Astilleros de Esteiro (Ferrol state shipyard), the docks, and was at a grand dinner at the admiral's. Groningen left on the 11th.

On 12 August Groningen arrived in Vigo Bay. Here the usual formalities took place. In the evening there was a military concert and fireworks. At 9 AM on 13 August Groningen left.

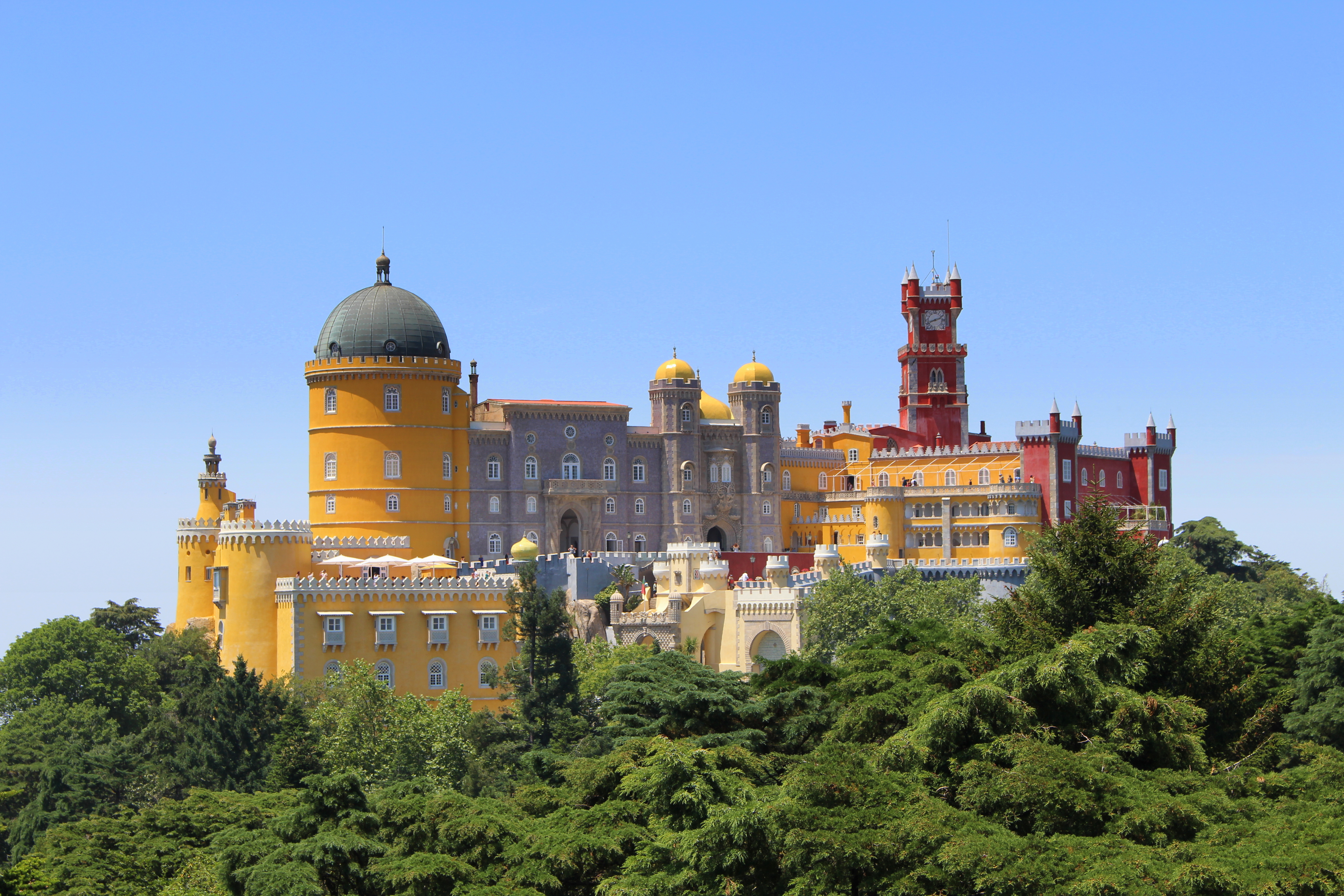
Pena Palace

On the 14 August Groningen arrived at Lissabon at half past noon. Here she met the sailing frigate HNLMS De Ruyter, which had been there since 18 July. On 15 August they were joined by the screw frigate HNLMS Wassenaar.

On the day that the prince of Orange arrived he was visited on board by several dignitaries, among them the Duke of Terceira. On the 15th the prince and his entourage went to Sintra, where they received at court. The next day, the prince went on a hunt near Mafra, and stayed in the Palace of Mafra. Meanwhile, some officers of Groningen visited Pena Palace. On 19 August, the prince arrived back on board Groningen escorted by the Duke of Porto. After several more visits, Groningen left Lissabon on the 22nd.

On 23 August Groningen passed the Strait of Gibraltar. In the evening of the 25th she arrived in Málaga. On the morrow the prince visited the city. That evening there was a big dinner on board Groningen. On the 27th the prince left for Granada. Here he visited many sights. On 4 September he was back in Málaga. On 7 September Groningen left Málaga.

On 9 September Groningen anchored before Valencia. Here the prince stayed at the very comfortable inn Fonda del Cid at Archbishop's square. ON the 10th and 11th the prince was sightseeing. On the 13th, there was a big parade of 5,400 soldiers, after which Groningen left Valencia, and the Prince went the visit the Spanish court at Madrid.

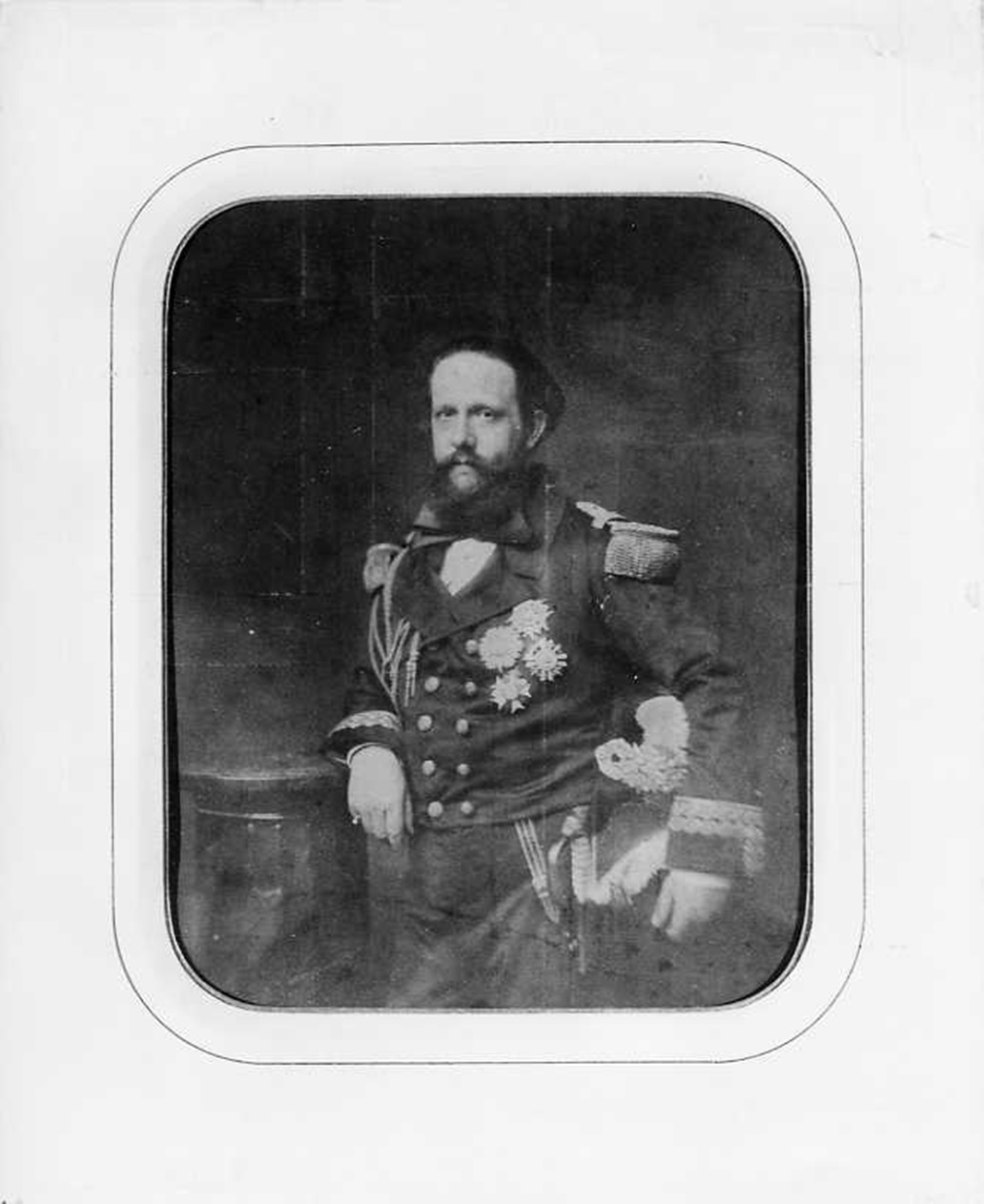
The Count of Aquila

On 15 September Groningen arrived at Barcelona. Here Groningen again met Wassenaar and both stayed over there till the 19th. Groningen then went back to Valencia, and arrived there on the 20th. On the 21st the prince arrived back from Madrid. On the 22nd Groningen was at Palma de Mallorca, and on the 23rd the prince made a tour of the island. In the evening there was a ball for 450 persons at the Captain-general's residence. It lasted till 5 in the morning. On the 24th Groningen left again. On the 25th Menorca was visited. On the 26th, she left again for Sicily.

Already on 26 September Groningen ran into a storm. On the 29th Cape San Vito was sighted. In the evening Groningen anchored before Palermo. The prince visited Palermo incognito. On 2 October Groningen left Palermo.

She next visited Naples, capital of the Kingdom of the Two Sicilies. After Wassenaar had again joined Groningen, the prince and the officers of both ships visited the Teatro di San Carlo on 4 October. On the 5th Prince Louis, Count of Aquila visited Groningen. That same day the prince visited the Museo Borbonico. On the 7th he visited the king in his residence Gaeta. On 11 October, the prince went to visit Pompeii by train. Later he went to Portici, Herculaneum and climbed Mount Vesuvius. On the 13th the prince went by train to Maddaloni, and then to Caserta by carriage. Next came Capua and Pozzuoli. After some more detours, he then returned to Groningen.

On 18 October Groningen and the prince left Naples. On 25 October she was before the Strait of Gibraltar, but a storm made that she dropped anchor before Algeciras. On the morrow she continued to Cadiz. After bunkering, Groningen left Cadiz under sail on the 29th. With favorable winds, Groningen entered the English Channel after 5 days. In the night of 5–6 November there was a dense fog. The Vlissingen and Texel pilots came aboard after much gunfire and sounding of the bell. At noon on 6 November Groningen anchored on the roadstead of Vlissingen.

=== To the Dutch East Indies ===
On 1 December 1857 Groningen was commissioned again. The new commander was Captain-lt M.F. Courier dit Dubikart. On 30 December 1857 Groningen left Vlissingen for the Dutch East Indies. She had a shipment of coins on board. On 1 March 1858 Groningen anchored at Cape Town. Just before reaching Batavia, Groningen had been caught in a heavy tropical cyclone 175 miles south of Sunda Strait. Afterwards the commander was enthusiastic about Groningen's qualities as a sea ship. It had not been badly shaken in the cyclone, and the machinery had also not been damaged. Both would indicate that the ship was rigid enough.

On 26 April Groningen arrived at Batavia. The damage from The cyclone was then restored at Onrust Island. On 2 June Groningen left for Telukbetung (Bandar Lampung) and the coast of Sumatra on Sunda Strait. On 1 July 1858 Groningen arrived back at Batavia.

=== The Jambi expedition ===
In late early August 1858 an expedition would be sent against Jambi Sultanate. It consisted of the warships: Groningen, Celebes, Onrust and Van Kinsbergen, and the government ship Bennett, all commanded by Courier dit Dubekart. The transports hired for the expedition were: Regina Maria, Capt. Ouwehand; Cornelia Mathilda, skipper Snoeij, and Acadia skipper der Greefkens. The troops were the 1st, 3rd and 4th company of the 12th infantry battalion, and an artillery detachment, all commanded by Major van Langen.

On 5 August the expedition left Batavia, and on the 8th it reached Muntok on the Bangka Belitung Islands. On 20 August it was before the Batang Hari River. It then steamed up the river. At Muara Kumpeh it was reinforced with 13 vessels, and on 2 September it anchored at the Sedingjang Islands before Jambi city. On 6 August the expedition attacked Jambi and the many fortresses. The navy participated with the Celebes, Onrust, Van Kinsbergen, and the government ship Bennett. Groningen stayed before the river. Four officers and 110 sailors joined the army troops that landed. The expedition conquered Jambi in one day, losing 5 dead and 55 wounded. Courier dit Dubikart commanded the naval element from one of the ships on the river. On 14 November 1858 Groningen, Regina Maria and Acadia arrived back in Batavia from Jambi.

=== Second Bone War ===
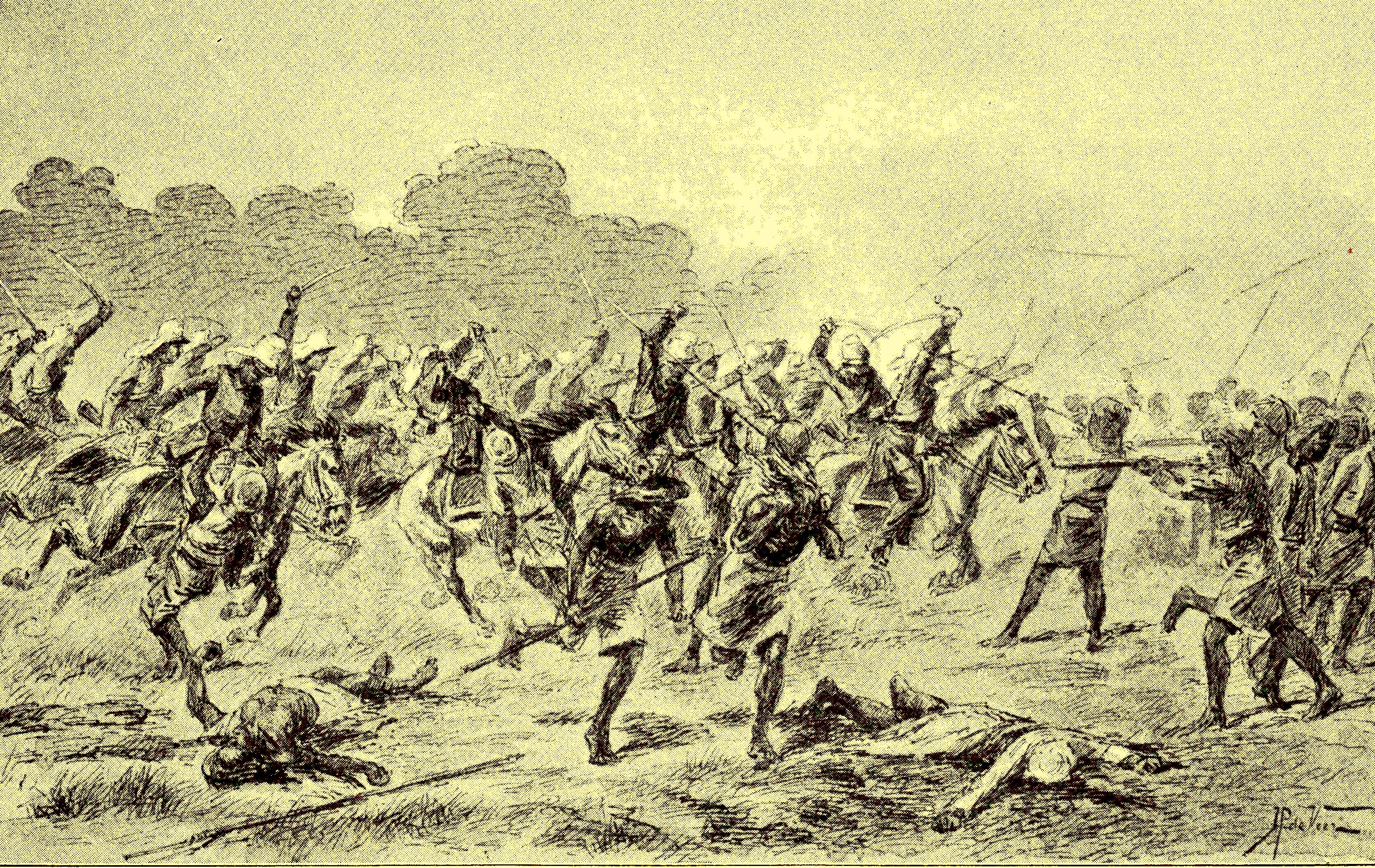
Dutch cavalry charge against Boni

Groningen next became involved in the Second Bone War against the Bone state on Sulawesi. The conflict with Bone or Boni, was a very serious affair. The navy would participate with: Groningen, Gedeh, Amsterdam, Merapi, Phoenix, Madura, Celebes, Van Kinsbergen, Medusa, 3 schooners and 6 cruising vessels under the overall command of Captain B.H. Staring. The army fielded the 3rd, 10th and 14th battalion, as well as a cavalry squadron and artillery. The overall command of the expedition was with Major-General E.C.C. Steinmetz.

On 6 January 1859 Groningen left Batavia for Semarang. From Samarang Groningen left for Boni on 14 January. She was accompanied by Phoenix and several troop ships. On 7 February the expedition had united before Sinjai and Bajoe. On 12 February part of the expedition landed and took Bajoe, just east of the capital Boni, now officially named Watampone. On 18 February Groningen arrived Surabaya from Boni. Meanwhile, the expedition seemed well on its way. On 28 February the troops succeeded in taking and burning Boni. All troops then returned to Bajoe, and the fort which was under construction there. On 2 March Groningen was back at Bajoe.

In the end it proved that the Dutch had not succeeded in decisively beating the Boni troops. The Boni government and army retreated inland, and continued to function from there. Meanwhile, a cholera outbreak killed many of the Dutch officers and men. This probably put an end to any thoughts of continuing the expedition on the short term. Most of the troops were then retreated, except for the Bajoe garrison. On 17 April Groningen again arrived at Semarang. She was towing Electra, Susanna, and Elisabeth carrying troops that returned from Boni. From there, she left for Surabaya on 20 April.

On 28 April 1859 Groningen left for another trip to Makassar and Bone. At some time Dubekart made a report about the situation at Boni. It was supposed to have led to the dismissal of the local commanders Colonel Waleson and Captain Staring, who later proved to have been ill for a long time. Groningen was then involved in the blockade of Boni, until she could be freed up to be repaired on Java. On 1 July Courier dit Dubikart was promoted to captain.

=== Repairs in Surabaya ===
On 7 September 1859 Groningen arrived in Surabaya from Bone. She then went to be repaired in Surabaya. There was a message that the beams below the deck had sagged in, and repairs would cost 80,000 guilders.

Repairing the beams below the deck could be done without special means. However, thorough repair and maintenance would require work on the outside of the hull. As Groningen was a propeller driven ship, it was dangerous to careen her. Instead she had to be lifted by a dry dock. At the time, there were two big dry docks in the Dutch East Indies: Onrust Wooden Dock and Surabaya Wooden Dock of 1,100 tons.

=== Voyage to Japan ===
The next mission of Groningen was a voyage to Japan under Captain-lt J. van der Meersch. He wrote an extensive report, which was published. Groningen was to transport the new Consul-General J.K. de Wit for Japan. She would next be at the disposal of the new commissioner for the Japan and Siam, J.H. Donker Curtius. On 15 January 1860 Groningen left Surabaya. On the 24th Groningen anchored before Ternate. As her draft prevented her from attaching to the bunkering station, Groningen could not continue before the 29th.

On 23 February Groningen reached Japan. On the 24th Consul-General J.K. de Wit disembarked at Nagasaki. At the time, there was a lot of tension in Japan, as many foreigners were assassinated. In Yokohama Mr. De Vos and Mr. De Dekker, captains of the merchant ships Christina Louise and Henriette Louise were assassinated on 27 February. On 11 March Groningen left Nagasaki for Yokohama.

On 15 March 1860 Groningen ran into a hurricane. The engines were stopped, steam pressure was deflated, and the fires were reduced to smouldering. The top rigging and spars were taken in, and only the barque sails were left up. In the hurricane, the galleon was broken off, as well as the gaff of the barque sail on the fore-mast. The most serious damage was on the rudder. The rudder stock (roerkoning) that connected the rudder to the steering installation had split from just where it entered the hull (hennegat) on the bottom side to the carrier bearing (upper point from where it hung). This caused the stock to get very much off center while steering. Therefore, Groningen was then steered by the rudder-stoppers.

In the night of 15–16 March, the hurricane increased, and the chains of both rudder-stoppers snapped, forcing Groningen again to steer with the rudder stock. An emergency repair succeeded in re-attaching chains to the rudder. Groningen then laid by with only a few small sails. In the high waves she could be handled quite easily. On the 17th the storm laid down a bit, and Groningen again started to use the steam engines. However, after a few hours the storm again increased to hurricane force. Groningen had a small storm sail and used a little engine to spare the rudder. The ships was terribly shaken by the enormous pressures on the hull, but according to the commander she held excellently.

After some very tense moments with the ship repeatedly becoming unnavigable, Groningen anchored before Nagasaki on 26 March 1860. The captain now set about to repair the rudder. In this he assisted by engineer H. Hardes, who worked for the Japanese government. It proved that the rudder had not been made so that the grain followed the bend below the rudder stock. This was the cause of the stock splitting. It was also found that the bronze chains and its shackles had been cast very badly. Near the end of April a sufficiently large oak-like piece of wood suitable for a new rudder had been found inland and transported to Nagasaki. The new rudder stock did not have a bend, so that it would be stronger. The chains were also replaced by stronger ones. The new rudder was hung in on 1 June.

On 7 June Groningen left Nagasaki for Yokohama. On 11 June she anchored before Yokohama. Here she was visited by the French Chargé d'affaires and the English Consul Captain Howard Vyse. Meanwhile, the situation at Yokohama had calmed down a lot since the assassination of the Dutch commodores De Vos and Dekker. Government troops guarded the foreigners, but their movement was very limited.

After some diplomatic maneuvering, the governor received Captain-lt van der Meersch in his palace on 4 July. On 5 July Groningen moved from Yokohama to arrived before Edo the same day. On 6 July, the Dutch commissioner, vice-consul, most of the officers and a detachment of marines disembarked. The Dutch representatives then stayed in a compound like residence at Akabana. On 8 July the Dutch delegation visited the Japanese foreign minister.

On 25 July Groningen returned to Yokohama. On 29 July she continued to Hakodate, where she anchored on 2 August. On 8 August she left again, and was back at Yokohama on the 11th. Next came a short visit to Edo to drop off the Dutch commissioner. Back at Yokohama, Groningen helped the Dutch Barque Krimpen aan de Lek, commander Ouwehand. She suffered from self-heating in a load of coal she had taken in as ballast. By sounding and using his sailors the danger was overcome. On 28 August the Dutch commissioner came on board again after concluding his affairs.

On 29 August Groningen left Yokohama for Nagasaki. She sailed between Honshu and Shikoku, and exited the inner sea through Kanmon Straits (Shimonoseki), where she passes between Honshu and Kyushu. On 8 September she anchored before Nagasaki. Here she found the Russian steam corvette Posadnik (885t) and clippers Nayezdnik (615t) and Dzhigit (615t).

=== Thailand ===
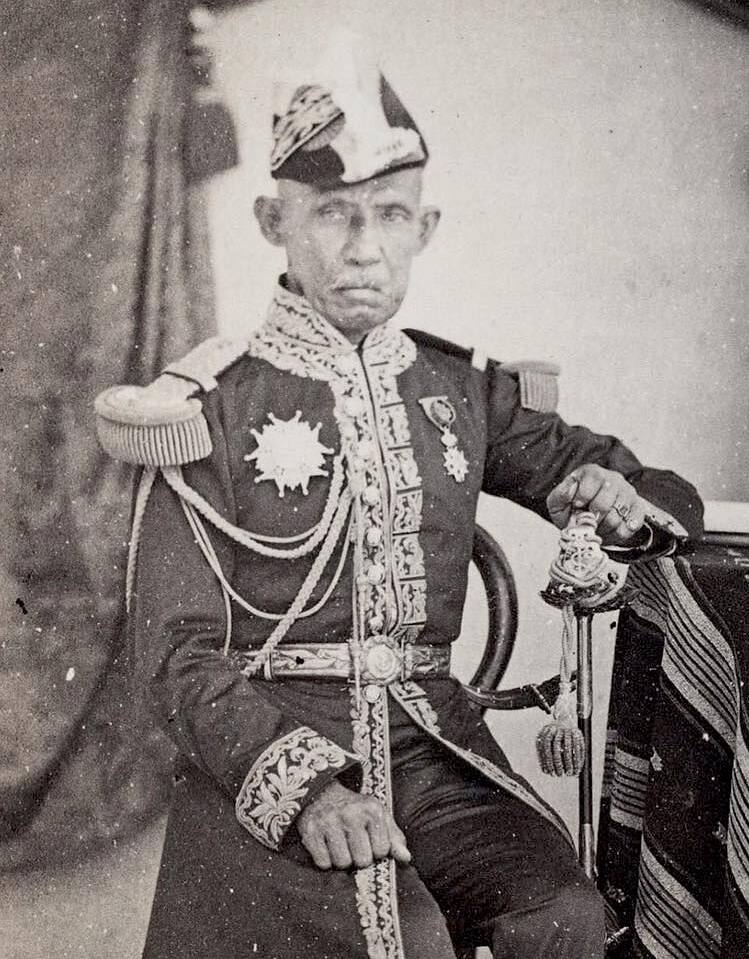
Second king Pinklao in a naval uniform

On 18 October 1860 Groningen left Nagasaki for Hong Kong and finally Thailand. On 25 October she anchored at Hong Kong, where she was greeted by the English steam corvette Esk, the American steam frigate Niagara, and the Prussian transport ship Elbe. The 1860 Japanese Embassy to the United States was returning on board Niagara. Trade at Hong Kong was slow because of the Second Opium War (1856–1860).

On 4 November Groningen continued to Thailand, the known as Siam. On 14 November Groningen anchored about 2.5 miles before the Chao Phraya River (Mae Nam), because her draft did not allow her to sail up river. Therefore, the Dutch commissioner and officers were collected by one of the Royal steam boats.

On 21 November the commissioner met the crown prince, the minister of foreign affairs, and chief of staff. Later the commissioner met the first king Mongkut and the prime minister. The prime minister Somdet Chaophraya Sri Suriwongse spoke English, and was versed in naval sciences. He had founded a large merchant navy, and was busy completing the construction of a 120 feet steam paddle vessel with an American engine. On 25 November the commissioner visited the second king Pinklao. He was very proficient in English, and knew a lot about science.

On 27 November the commissioner made his official visit to the first king, who spoke in Thai. On 28 November the prime minister visited Groningen. He was especially interested in the machinery and in acquiring some of the naval howitzers. On 3 December the second king Pinklao was visited. On 9 December Pinklao visited Groningen. On 10 December he again visited the ship. On 17 December a treaty with Thailand was signed. On the 24th Groningen left Thailand. On 4 January 1861 Groningen anchored before Batavia.

=== Aceh ===
On 23 January 1861 Groningen arrived at Surabaya. On 16 April she left Surabaya. On 20 April Groningen arrived in Batavia from Semarang. On 22 April she left Batavia for the naval base at Onrust Island. On 27 April she was back at Batavia. On 2 May she left Batavia for Padang. On 6 May Groningen arrived in Padang.

On 21 May 1861 Groningen, still under Captain-lt J. van der Meersch left Padang for Aceh. On 23 May she anchored before Sibolga, from whence she left on the 26th. On 31 May 1861 she anchored before Aceh. The mission was probably meant to impress and intimidate Aceh. The reception was rather hostile, with Aceh government not returning the salute by Groningen. Groningen then visited some nearby places, and returned to Padang on 17 June.

By mid-July Groningen had orders to return to Surabaya. On 15 August Groningen left Padang to be readied for returning to the Netherlands. On 19 August she arrived before Batavia. On 26 August she again arrived at Batavia, now from Onrust.

=== Lifted by Surabaya Wooden Dock ===
On 10 September 1861 Groningen arrived in Surabaya from Banjarmasin. By early October the Ministry for the Navy in the Netherlands already had reports that she would probably have to be broken up.

There is a clear message that Groningen was at some time lifted by Surabaya Wooden Dock of 1,100 tons. There are reasons to assume that this was the time that Groningen was lifted by the Surabaya dock. As the name of the dock implies, it was made for lifting ships of up to 1,100 tons. Groningen had a normal displacement of 1,457 tons. Therefore Groningen would have to be made lighter in order to fit the dock. This was a costly operation, the coal, guns, excess anchors and chains, iron water boxes, the upper rigging and all other heavy stores had to be removed. On 1 October 1861 Groningen was indeed seen laying without her removable rigging geheel onttakeld.

=== Return to the Netherlands ===
On 6 January 1862 Groningen, captain van der Meersch left Surabaya for Batavia. On 18 January 1862 she arrived in Batavia. On 12 February she left Batavia for Holland. On 6 April Groningen arrived in Cape Town On 6 July 1862 Groningen arrived in the Texel roadstead, and then Willemsoord, Den Helder.

=== Repairs and broken up ===
By 27 July 1862 Groningen had left Willemsoord for the navy shipyard in Amsterdam. In January 1863, about 6 months later, there was news about Groningen. While cutting rotten pieces, so many problems were discovered, that it was thought probable that she would be declared unfit. By February 1863 Groningen had indeed been declared unfit for further service.

== Aftermath ==
In October 1863 the Dutch House of Representatives noted that the navy had been not been very successful in acquiring ships, regardless of whether they had been built by the state shipyards or by private enterprise. While the state shipyards had built more solid ships, the properties of these had left much to be desired. The members made special mention of the fate of Groningen, built in 1857 and decommissioned in 1862.

Groningen's life span of only 5 years was rather unique. In Vlissingen, where the state shipyard was threatened with closure, people were quick to point out that private shipyards could or would not build solid warships. Shipyard Fop Smit pointed out that Groningen had been built according to the plans, and under direct surveillance by navy representatives.

The fate of Groningen's sister ships (see Groningen-class corvette) would confirm Fop Smit's opinion. In 1864 Citadel van Antwerpen was inspected in Vlissingen Navy Drydock. It led to a complete rebuild of that ship, which would only be completed in 1868. In January 1866 Vice Admiraal Koopman went into the dry dock. It led to her being in repair on the Vlissingen patent slip for almost a year. As such, the lifespan of Groningen's sister ships was rather comparable to hers.

A very likely explanation for the short service span of Groningen and her sisters is the lack of dry dock facilities in the East Indies. From her service record, it seems that Groningen was docked for the first time in late 1861, that is after 4 years of service.
