= Super Red Eagles =

Surinamese football club

- Full name: Super Red Eagles
- Founded: 2 January 1990
- Ground: Dr. Ir. Franklin Essed Stadion; Paramaribo, Suriname
- Capacity: 3,000
- League: Surinamese League
Home colours

Super Red Eagles is a Surinamese football club which currently plays in Suriname's first division. They play their home games in Paramaribo.

== Achievements ==
- Beker van Suriname: 1

2004
