= 2011 Surinamese Hoofdklasse/Eerste Klasse playoffs =

The 2011 Surinamese Hoofdklasse and Eerste Klasse playoffs was a home-away aggregate playoff series between the 9th-place Hoofdklasse club of the 2010–11 season, and the winner of the #2 vs. #3 playoff of the 2010–11 Eerste Klasse play-off.

== Results ==
30 July 2011
16:00

| Takdier Boys | 1 – 2 | Voorwaarts |
|---|---|---|
| | Report |

Eddy Blackman Stadion Livorno

13 August 2011
16:00

| Voorwaarts | 4 – 1 | Takdier Boys |
|---|---|---|
| | Report |

Voorwaartsveld, Paramaribo

Voorwaarts win 6–2 on aggregate and remain in the Hoofdklasse
