= Groningen-class corvette =

Dutch class of steam corvettes

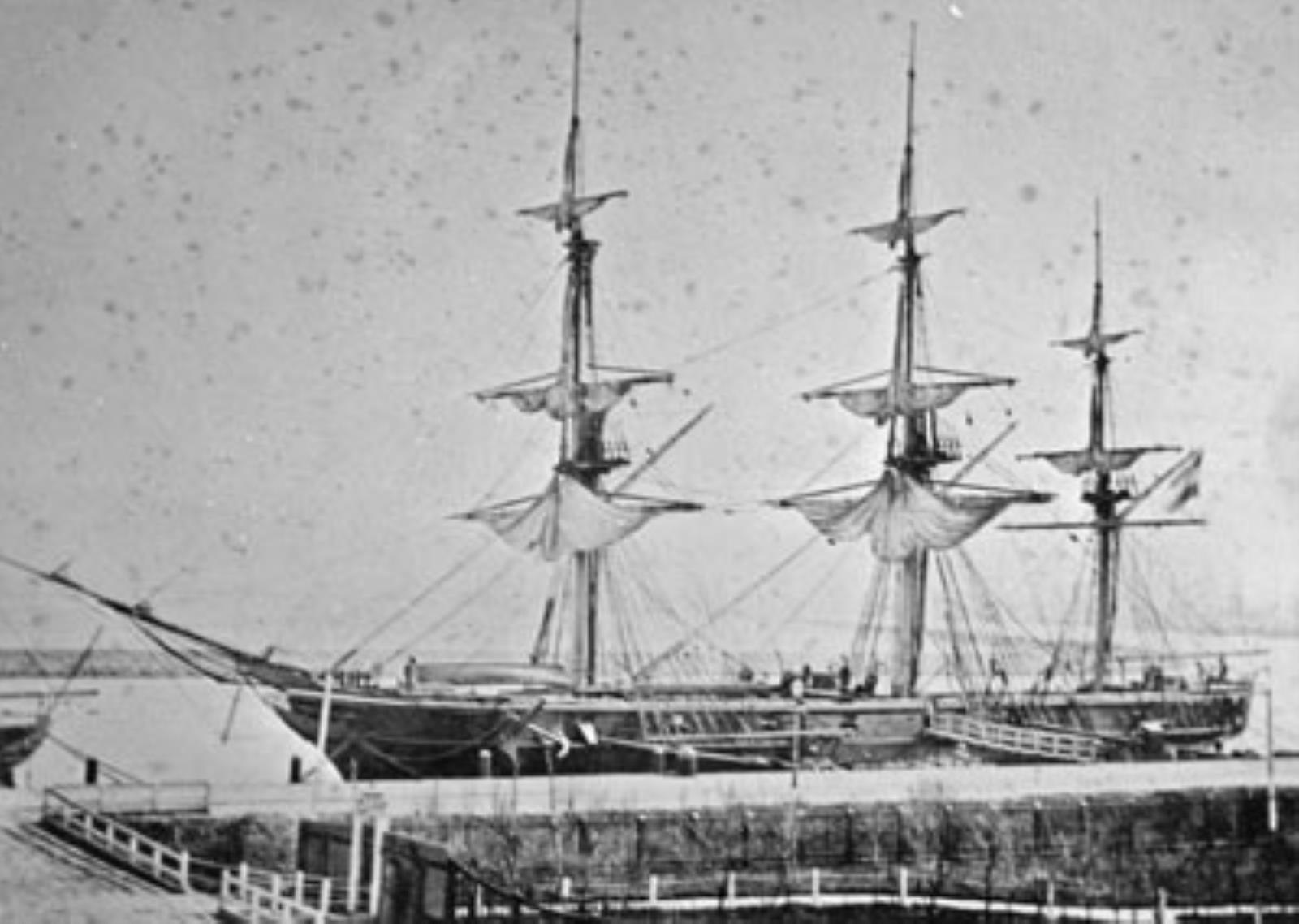
- Vice Admiraal Koopman

Class overview
- Name: Groningen class
- Builders: Rijkswerf Amsterdam, Fop Smit Kinderdijk
- Operators: Royal Netherlands Navy
- Succeeded by: Djambi-class corvette
- In commission: 1857–?
- Planned: 3
- Completed: 3
- Scrapped: 3

General characteristics
- Type: Steam Corvette
- Displacement: 1,457-1,780 tons
- Length: 58.80 m (192 ft 11 in)
- Beam: 10.74 m (35 ft 3 in)
- Draught: 5.00 m (16 ft 5 in)
- Installed power: 250 nominal horsepower; 700 indicated horsepower (520 kW)
- Speed: 9 knots (17 km/h)
- Complement: 180
- Armament: 5–7 × 16 cm RML and 6 × 30-pdr Long No 2
- Armour: ship made of wood

The Groningen class was a class of steam corvettes of the Royal Netherlands Navy. The class comprised Groningen, Citadel van Antwerpen and Vice-Admiraal Koopman

== Dutch Naval Plans in the 1850s ==
=== Dutch reaction to the Screw Steam Ship ===
On 8 February 1855 Smit van den Broecke became the new Dutch Secretary for the navy. At the time the Dutch were in a difficult situation. Many countries had built screw-propelled steam ships that out-sailed and out-gunned everything the Dutch navy had. The Dutch navy also required a screw propelled fleet. The reaction by Smit van den Broecke was so quick that it probably reflected plans made earlier.

=== Plan 1855 ===
In May 1855 Smit van den Broecke presented an overall plan for the fleet at home and in the East Indies. The heaviest ships of the new fleet would be 3 screw steam frigates of 400 hp, 50 guns and 500 men, to be stationed in the Netherlands. The standard fighting warship for the East Indies would be a screw corvette of 250 hp, 12 30-pounders and 125 men, of which 12 would be built. For policing the many outposts in the Indies 15 sloops of 100 hp, 12 guns and 85 men would be built. These would be supplemented by small paddle ships that would navigate rivers and shallow waters. The ships of the Groningen class fitted the 250 hp corvettes of this plan.

== Characteristics of the Groningen class ==
The Groningen class was not characterized as a corvette in the 1855 plan. However, in 1857 it was generally characterized as a steam corvette (stoomkorvet) or screw corvette (schroefkorvet). Photographs and technical drawings show the class was ship-rigged. The ship displacement was also in line with that of the Royal Navy corvettes. In 1857 the class was mentioned as screw steamships of the second class (Schroefstoomschepen tweede klas), while some smaller screw ships were mentioned as screw steam ships fourth class.

=== Design ===
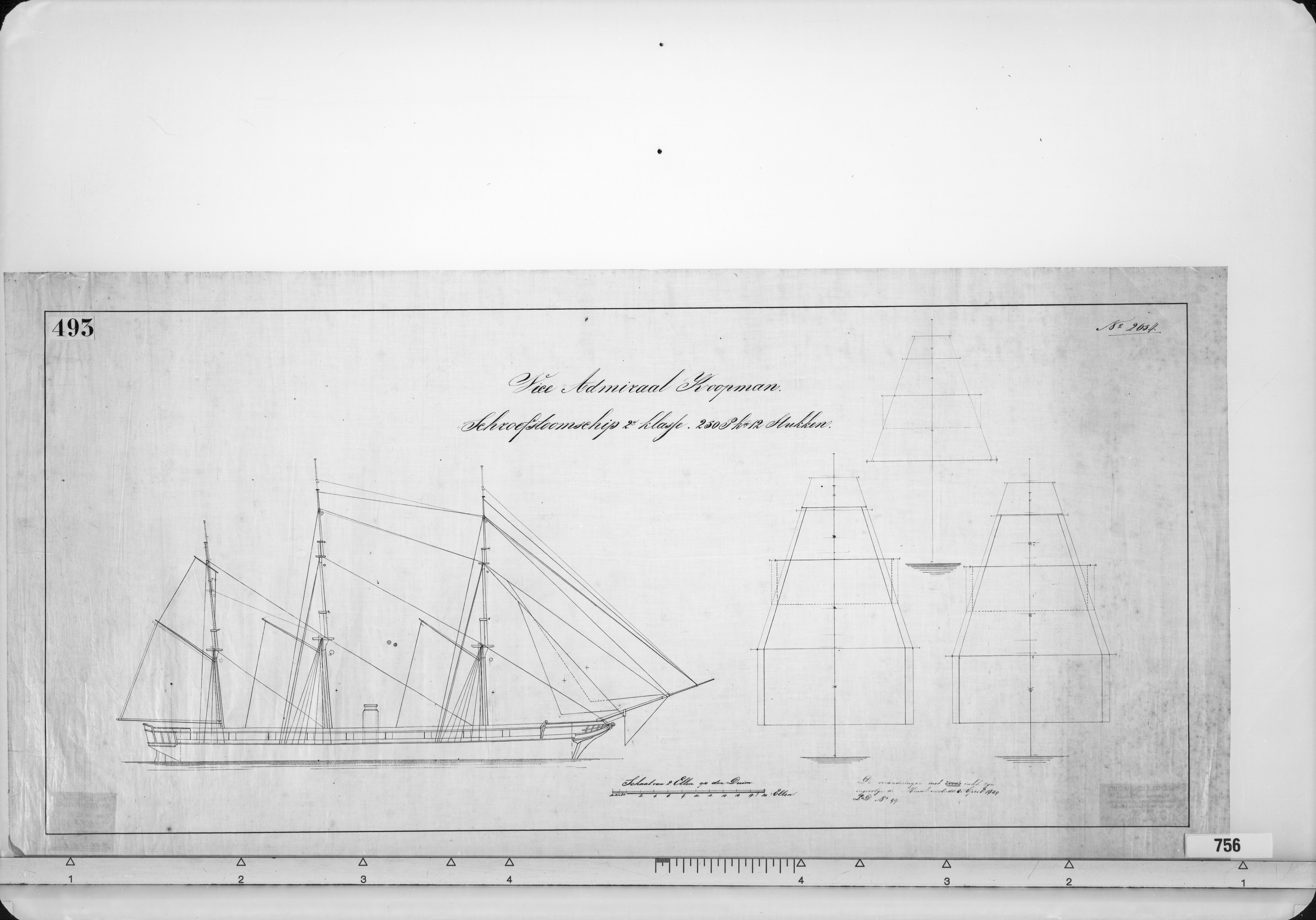
Sail plan of the Dutch steam corvette Vice-Admiraal Koopman

The designed beam of the Groningen class was limited. It made for a class of rather slender and fast ships. In 1859 Tideman claimed that the stiffness of the hull of the lead ship Groningen was 'only just satisfactory'. Indeed the lead ship Groningen would be declared unfit in 1863, after serving only 6 years.

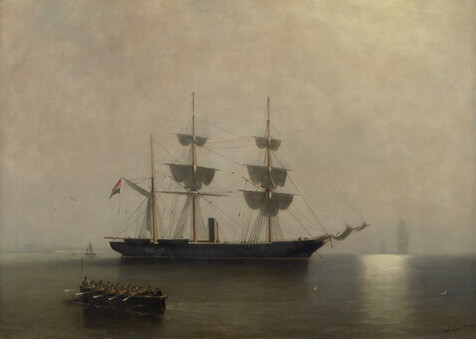
Citadel van Antwerpen

Citadel van Antwerpen was built according to the rules for calculating dimensions, weights and shapes for a steam corvette described by Tideman in his 1859 work. Both Citadel and Koopman were significantly larger than Groningen.

The Dutch National Archive has a lot of technical drawings of Vice Admiraal Koopman. Technical drawings of the privately built Groningen are in the Maritime Museum Rotterdam

=== Armament ===
In the initial plans the armament of the Groningen class was given as 12 30-pounders. Such a vague statement was normal at a time when the armament could still change at a later time. In 1859 Tideman foresaw 4 × 30-pounder long No 1, 4 × 30-pounder long No 4 and 4 × 20 cm light grenade guns. In 1862 rifled muzzle loaders (RML) were introduced in the Dutch Navy, and being relatively modern, the class was re-armed. In 1876 the armament of the class was given as 5 (Citadel: 7) × 16 cm RML and 6 × 30-pounder Long No 2. Also in 1875 there was a claim that 12 16 cm RML were required for the class, but it is not clear whether all guns were replaced by the 16 cm RML.

=== Propulsion ===
The Groningen class had machines of 250 nominal horsepower. When the Dutch shifted to using indicated horse power, the machines were measured at 700 indicated horse power. The machines for Groningen were made by the Nederlandsche Stoombootmaatschappij in Feijenoord.

Citadel van Antwerpen (ex-Dordrecht) had machines made by Van Vlissingen en Dudok van Heel this was a Penn trunk engine of 250 hp. Citadel had two pairs of boilers placed back to back, capable of firing to 300 hp. Designed pressure was 15 kilogram per square inch.

=== Names ===
The ships were first named Groningen, Dordrecht and Leeuwarden. The initial idea might have been to name the ships of the class for the capitals of the 11 provinces. Dordrecht was not a provincial capital, but it was the home town of Secretary for the Navy Lotsy. He had been mayor of Dordrecht before being appointed as secretary in August 1856. In June 1857 Dordrecht and Leeuwarden were renamed on account of the 25 year remembrance of the Siege of Antwerp (1832). The medal instituted on account of the siege would be part of the ornamentation of the stern of Citadel van Antwerpen

=== Rebuild ===
Both Citadel van Antwerpen (February 1865 – 1869) and Vice-Admiraal Koopman (May 1866 - 1867?) would undergo such extensive repairs that these amounted to a rebuild. This was probably the moment that the armament was changed, and one or both of the ships were lengthened.

On 2 August 1864 Citadel van Antwerpen anchored before Flushing with a defect in the screw. On 21 November 1864 Citadel van Antwerpen was brought into the Vlissingen Navy Drydock for inspection. The results were not good. On 19 February 1865 workmen started to tow Citadel onto the patent slip of Vlissingen Naval Base. Soon after there was talk of 'very big repairs'. She would stay on the slipway for more than 3 years.

On 4 July 1868 Citadel van Antwerpen was launched a second time from the Rijkswerf in Flushing. On 7 July she was brought into the drydock to be coppered. On 21 August the paddle-steamer Valk arrived to bring Citadel to Willemsoord, where she would be completed. Their departure on 26 August marked the start of the evacuation of the Rijkswerf Vlissingen. While under tow a storm hit the ships. Citadel could not use its engine and was lucky to be blown into the harbor. In September 1869 Citadel was said to leave for Amsterdam to be finished there. In July 1870 she was registered as a reserve, with 13 guns and 175 men. Citadel van Antwerpen arrived in Flushing on 14 August 1870, meaning she was finally back in service in 1870.

On 23 March 1865 Vice Admiraal Koopman arrived back in Flushing from the Dutch East Indies. On 15 April 1865 the Koopman was decommissioned. In mid-January the Koopman went into the dry-dock and there were rumors of big repairs. When she was brought out of the dry-dock there was only talk of a completed reparation. On 4 May 1866 the Koopman was towed on the slipway in Flushing. On 4 April 1867 the Koopman was launched again. On 24 June 1867 the Koopman left Flushing under tow by the Valk. On board were workmen of the yard, who would be moved to Amsterdam, and also the machinery to armor ships. The Koopman was to be fitted out in Amstrerdam, and arrived in Nieuwediep on 30 June 1867.

== Construction ==
Of the 3 ships 1 was built by the private yard of Fop Smit in Kinderdijk. The two others were built at the Rijkswerf in Amsterdam.

Name	Built by	Laid down	Launched	Commissioned	Fate
Groningen	Fop Smit, Kinderdijk	1855	9 April 1857	1 July 1857	29 September 1863 unfit
Citadel van Antwerpen (ex Dordrecht)	Rijkswerf Amsterdam	19 February 1856	1857	11 April 1858	
Vice-Admiraal Koopman (ex Leeuwarden)	Rijkswerf Amsterdam	18 October 1856	29 April 1858	6 September 1858	August 1876 decommissioned
