= S.V. The Brothers =

Surinamese football club

The Brothers
- Full name: Sport Vereniging The Brothers
- Founded: 18 July 2006; 18 years ago
- Ground: Clarence Seedorf Stadion; Oost, Para
- Capacity: 3,500
- Manager: Maurice Ligeon
- League: Eerste Klasse
Home colours

Sport Vereniging The Brothers is a Surinamese football club based in Oost, Para District. The club presently competes in the Eerste Klasse, the 2nd tier of Surinamese football.

== History ==
Founded in 2006, S.V. The Brothers is a satellite club of S.S.D. Monza 1912 from Italy. Jürgen and Chedric Seedorf, the brothers of Dutch International Clarence Seedorf helped to establish the club, for which they themselves played during the 2010–11 season. The colors of SV The Brothers consist of a red and white playing kit.

== Competitive results ==
4	1	2	8	10
07	08	09	10	11
District West / SVB Eerste Klasse / SVB Hoofdklasse

== Honours ==
- Lidbondentoernooi: Runners-up

2008

- District West (Coronie): Winners

2008
