= Groningen, Suriname =

Groningen
- Town and resort
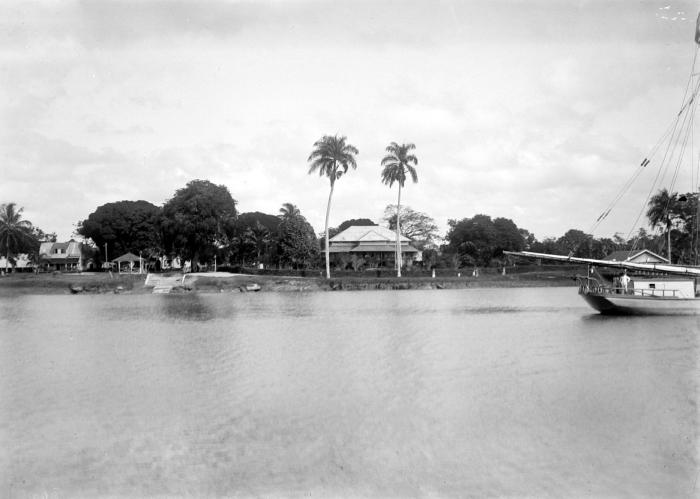
- Groningen (before 1929)

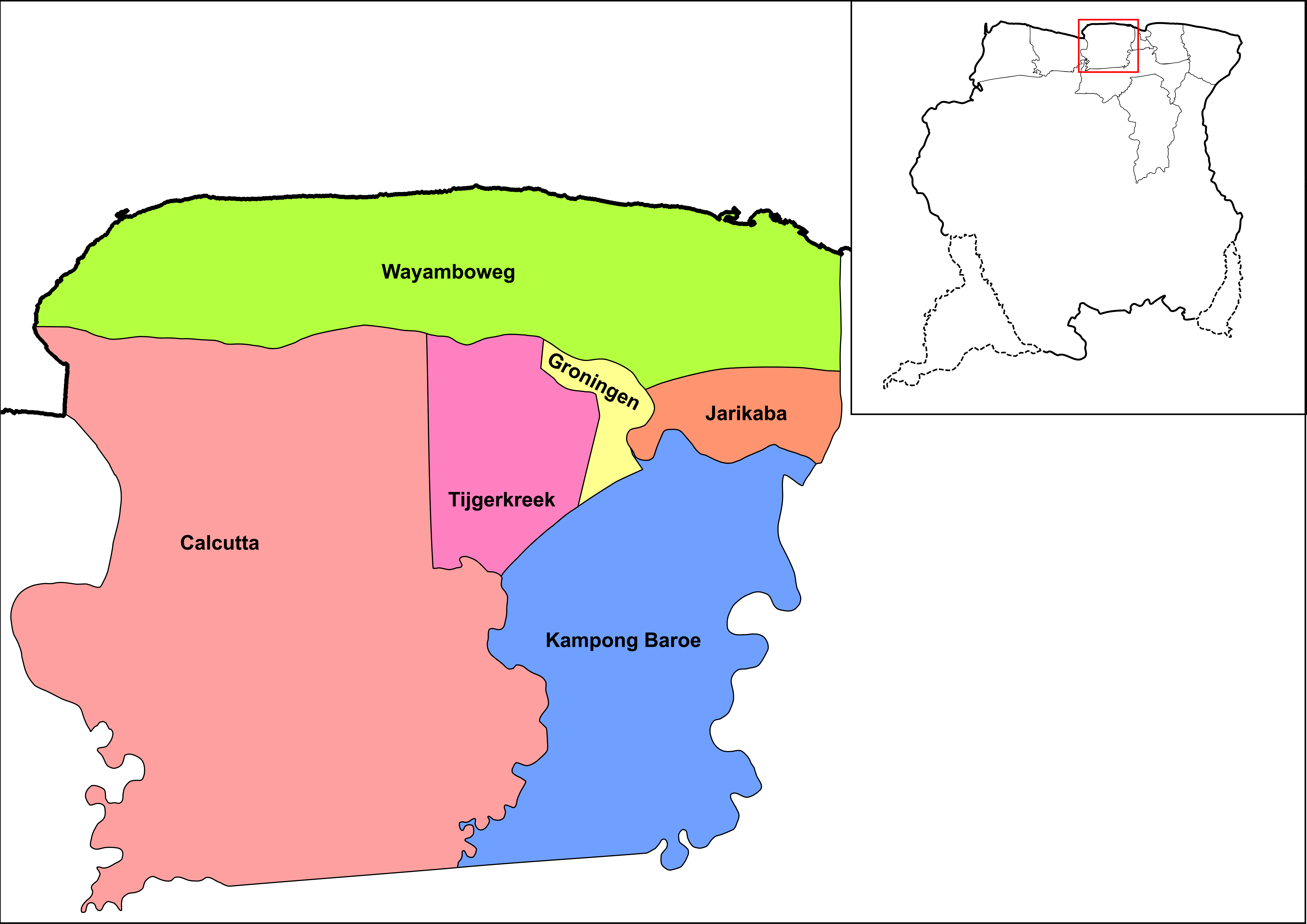

- Location in Suriname
- Coordinates: 5°48′0″N 55°28′0″W
- Country: Suriname
- District: Saramacca District
- Founded: 1790
- Named for: Groningen, Netherlands

Area
  - Total: 57 km^{2} (22 sq mi)
- Elevation: 9 m (30 ft)

Population (2012)
  - Total: 2,818
  - Density: 49/km^{2} (130/sq mi)

Groningen is the capital town of the Saramacca District, Suriname.

Groningen only began to grow after 1960. Around that time the East-West Link, a road linking Albina via Paramaribo to Nieuw Nickerie was built. This let Groningen become accessible by road.

The town features: an office of the district commissioner; a post office; an office for the police commander, an office of the State health foundation(SZF) and the J. Eliazer football stadium, named after the founder of the Football Federation of Saramacca and president. There is also a Moravian Church and a Roman Catholic church.

In 1910, a nursing home for yaws sufferers was established. It was closed after it was discovered that the disease could be cured within days by applying Salvarsan.

== History ==
A pentagonal fort was built on this site in 1790, which was named by Governor Jan Wichers, after his birthplace in Groningen, in what was at the time the Dutch Republic. Across the river was a leper colony by the name of Voorzorg, meaning 'precaution'. Fort Groningen was part of a cordon of forts. However the fort itself had only a few plantations and therefore was not very developed. There were plans to expand the fort and build a town that would be called Columbia, however not much more than the fort itself, a few blocks, a cemetery and an 1830s Moravian Church was ever built. During his time as a soldier in Suriname (1836–1842), August Kappler described the area, and notes about Groningen that "on this place (...) a city would be built. Several streets have been laid out (...); however for the main issue, houses, one searches in vain." The fort was rediscovered in 2011.

== Colonisation attempt ==
At the end of 1845 the survivors of a group of Dutch farmers, led by Pastor Arend van den Brandhof, arrived in Groningen. They emigrated to Suriname from the Dutch province of Groningen to help build a new life on the other side of the Saramacca River. Within six months nearly two hundred people had died of typhus and/or yellow fever and the remainder resettled across the river in Groningen. Countless other settlers died. From 1849 small groups of survivors began to move to the areas of Kwatta and Uitvlugt near Paramaribo. Colonisation was considered a failure in 1853, when there was a total of 43 people left living in Groningen. The following year their leader, Arend van den Brandhof, departed, heading back to the Netherlands. His wife, Anna Pannekoek, had died in 1845 and been buried in the cemetery in Groningen. Pannekoekstraat, a street running through Groningen, is named after her. When the districts were established in 1863, Groningen became the capital of the Saramacca district. Van den Brandhof's house, now left alone, became the residence of the district commissioner. In 1945 a monument was built to commemorate the presence of the Boeroes in Groningen. It was unveiled on 20 June 1945. On the 150-year anniversary in 1995, descendants of the Boeroes donated a medical laboratory to Groningen.

== See also ==
- Groningen (disambiguation)
