= List of Surinamese writers =

A list of notable Surinamese writers:

== A ==
- Clark Accord
- Willy Alberga
- Karin Amatmoekrim
- Bernardo Ashetu

== B ==
- Aphra Behn
- Bhai (James Ramlall)

== C ==
- Cándani

== D ==
- Thea Doelwijt
- Eugène Drenthe

== F ==
- Hans Faverey

== G ==
- Chitra Gajadin
- Henna Goudzand Nahar
- Trudi Guda

== H ==
- Albert Helman

== K ==
- Anton de Kom
- Ismene Krishnadath

== L ==
- Tessa Leuwsha
- Noni Lichtveld

== M ==
- Cynthia McLeod

== N ==
- David Nassy

== P ==
- André Pakosie
- Pim de la Parra
- Hugo Pos

== R ==
- Anil Ramdas
- Hélène Ramjiawan
- Sophie Redmond
- Astrid Roemer

== S ==
- Johanna Schouten-Elsenhout
- Shrinivási
- Marylin Simons
- Ronald Snijders
- John Gabriel Stedman

== T ==
- Trefossa (Henny de Ziel)

== V ==
- Vene (Ronald Venetiaan)
- Wim Bos Verschuur
- Bea Vianen

== W ==
- Joanna Werners
