= List of women book publishers =

This is a list of women book publishers with Wikipedia pages.

== A ==
- Susan Allison (living)
- Joan Anim-Addo (living)
- Ellen Asher (living)
- Diana Athill (1917–2019)
- Esther Averill (1902–1992)

== B ==
- Bibi Bakare-Yusuf (born 1970)
- Betty Ballantine (1919–2019)
- Victoria Barnsley (born 1954)
- Francesca Beauman (born 1977)
- Nicola Beauman (born 1944)
- Nancy K. Bereano (born 1942)
- Elsie Bertram (1912–2003)
- Marion Boyars (1927–1999)
- Valerie Brandes (living)
- Margaret Busby (born 1944)

== C ==
- Liz Calder (born 1938)
- Carmen Callil (1938–2022)
- Frances Coady (living)
- Emily Cordner-Pinkerton (?–1902)
- May Cutler (1923–2011)

== D ==
- Lady Margaret Douglas-Home (1906–1996)
- Marie-Antoinette Duchesne (after 1713–1793)

== E ==
- Madeleine Eggendorffer (1744–1795)
- Christiane Akoua Ekué (born 1954)

== F ==
- Helen Fraser (born 1949)

== G ==
- Vi Gale (1917–2007)
- Roxane Gay (born 1974)
- Jessika Gedin (born 1970)
- Ann Getty (1941–2020)
- Anette Gleichmann (born 1964)
- Elizabeth Glover (1602–1643)
- Mary Jane Godwin (1768–1841)
- Lennie Goodings (born 1953)
- Phyllis E. Grann (born 1937)
- Marit Greve (1928–2021)
- Maria Guarnaschelli (1941–2021)

== H ==
- Colleen Higgs (born 1962)
- Marie Høeg (1866–1949)
- Lois Hole (1929–2005)
- Jessica Huntley (1927–2013)

== J ==
- Anthea Joseph (1924–1981)

== K ==
- Eleanor Kirk (1831–1908)
- Blanche Knopf (1894–1966)
- Helgard Krause (born 1970)
- Ismene Krishnadath (born 1956)

== L ==
- Ros de Lanerolle (1932–1993)
- Linda Lee (born 1947)
- Muthoni Likimani (born 1926)
- Miriam Linna (born 1955)

== M ==
- Marilyn Malin (died 2022)
- Perminder Mann (living)
- Kathleen Martin (living)
- Deborah Martinez-Martinez (born 1954)
- Maile Meyer (born 1957)
- Vera Michalski (born 1954)
- Lilian Mohin (1938–2020)
- Els Moor (1937–2016)
- Cherríe Moraga (born 1952)
- Pamela Morris (1906–2002)

== N ==
- Ursula Nordstrom (1910–1988)
- Flora Nwapa (1931–1993)

== O ==
- Asenath Bole Odaga (1938–2014)
- Ursula Owen (born 1937)

== P ==
- Helen Parsons Smith (1910–2003)
- Polly Pattullo (living)
- Tolulope Popoola (living)
- Anna Porter (living)
- Alexandra Pringle (born 1953)

== Q ==
- Christine Qunta (born 1952)

== R ==
- Sigrid Rausing (born 1962)
- Gail Rebuck (born 1952)
- Merete Ries (1938–2018)
- Pam Royds (1924–2016)

== S ==
- Chiki Sarkar (born 1979)
- Susan Shaw (1932–2020)
- Norah Smallwood (1909–1984)
- Irene Staunton (living)
- Efua Sutherland (1924–1996)

== T ==
- Gay Taylor (1896–1970)
- Janet E. Tobitt (1898–1984)

== W ==
- Ellah Wakatama (born 1966)
- Alice Walker (born 1944)
- Zukiswa Wanner (born 1976)
- Barbara Harrison Wescott (1904–1977)
- Verna Wilkins (born 1943)
- Stephanie Wolfe Murray (1941–2017)
- Virginia Woolf (1882–1941)

== Y ==
- Elizabeth Yeats (1868–1940)
