= Judith de Kom =

Dutch-Surinamese activist and novelist (1931–2024)

- Born: 16 March 1931; The Hague, Netherlands
- Died: 13 October 2024 (aged 93); Netherlands
- Occupations: Activist, novelist, writer
- Relatives: Anton de Kom (father)

Judith de Kom (16 March 1931 – 13 October 2024) was a Dutch-Surinamese activist and novelist. The daughter of Anton de Kom, a Surinamese pro-independence activist and member of the Dutch resistance who died in a German concentration camp in 1945, Judith de Kom spent much of her life campaigning for the recognition of her father's role during World War II. In 2023, Prime Minister of the Netherlands Mark Rutte publicly apologized for Anton de Kom's treatment by the Dutch government before and after his death, thanks largely to Judith de Kom's activism.

Much of Judith de Kom's writings explored the themes of identity, family, and the Dutch colonial period in Suriname. Her best-known works include the 2021 novel, Het verlangen naar een eiland ("The Longing for an Island") about the legacy of colonialism on generations of the same family, which was loosely based on her own family history.

== Biography ==
Judith de Kom was born in the Netherlands in 1931 to writer and activist Anton de Kom and his Dutch wife, Petronella "Nel" Borsboom. She went with her family to Suriname in the end of 1932 because her grandmother, Judith Jacoba Dulder de Kom, was dying at the time. Anton de Kom was a vocal proponent for the independence of Dutch colonies, including Surinam and the Dutch East Indies. The family was exiled back to the Netherlands in 1933 due to her father's activism when de Kom was an infant. Judith de Kom lived in the Netherlands for the rest of her life.

In 2008, Vereniging Ons Suriname rediscovered Anton de Kom's manuscripts which were lost in the 1960s. The manuscripts contained the movie scenario Tjiboe, parts of the novels Ons bloed is rood and Om een hap rijst (For a bit of rice), and several Anansi stories about a spider who represents skill and wisdom in folktales of the Akan people. Judith de Kom and her brother, Ad de Kom, presented the archives to Dutch writer Michiel van Kempen by Judith de Kom and her brother, Ad, and are currently on display at the Literature Museum in The Hague.

In September 2024, Judith de Kom, in collaboration with writer Ida Does, published a book of letters to important figures in her life, including her father, titled k omhels je onafgebroken ("I embrace you endlessly") just one month before her death. She remarked to her publisher at the time, "The wreath has been laid, the book is here. Now I can rest."

Judith de Kom died in the Netherlands on 10 October 2024, at the age of 93. In a statement released via Nederlandse Omroep Stichting (NOS), her family noted that, "She dedicated her life to making the world a better place and the rehabilitation of her father’s name."
