= Els Moor =

Surinamese educator and publisher

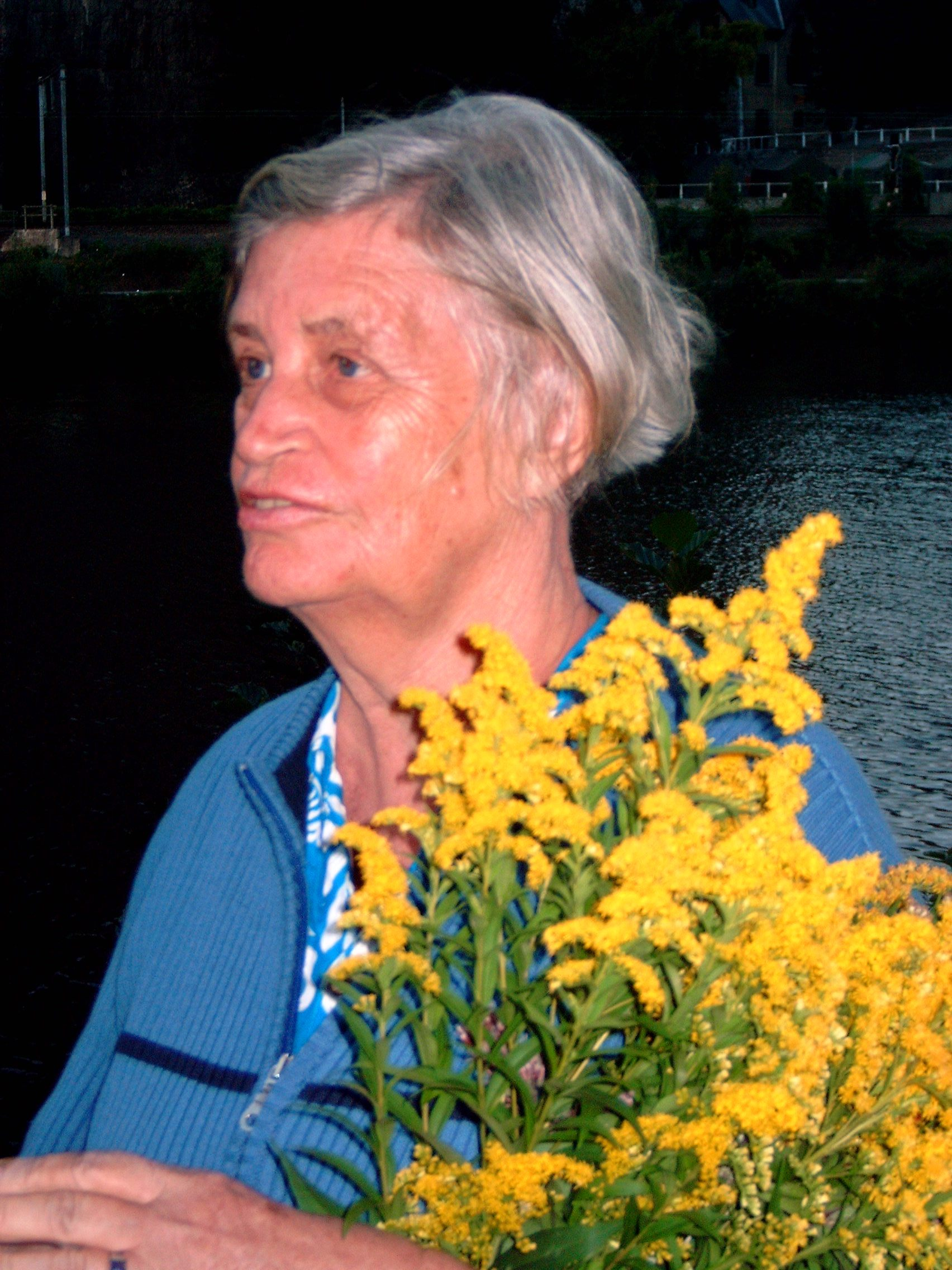
- Born: Elisabeth Henriëtte Pauline Moor; 17 May 1937; Heemstede, Netherlands
- Died: 9 March 2016 (aged 78); Paramaribo, Suriname
- Occupations: Educator, editor and publisher
- Notable work: Fa yu e tron leisibakru

Els Moor (17 May 1937 – 9 March 2016) was a Dutch-born Surinamese educator, editor and book publisher. She is best known for Fa yu e tron leisibakru, a literary education method for secondary education. Moor was the chief editor of De Ware Tijd Literair, and founder of the Okopipi publishing house.

== Biography ==
Moor was born on 17 May 1937 in Heemstede as Elisabeth Henriëtte Pauline Moor. She went to the grammar school in Hilversum, and received her doctorate in Dutch language and Literature from the University of Amsterdam.

Moor was a high school teacher in Bussum for twelve years, and in Amsterdam-Zuidoost for seven years. At the latter, she developed a passion for child friendly education, teaching the children according their ability.

== Suriname ==
In 1978, Moor moved to Suriname where she taught at the Surinamese Pedagogical Institute and the Instituut voor de Opleiding van Leraren until her retirement in 1997.

In 1992, Moor became the chief editor of the De Ware Tijd Literair, the weekly literary section of De Ware Tijd. She changed the focus to youth literature, and national and international literature for adults. The literary section resulted in several book publications, therefore, in 2001, Moor established the publishing house Okopipi named after the blue poison dart frog. Okopipi published work from Bea Vianen, Bernardo Ashetu, Marylin Simons, and Michiel van Kempen among others.

Moor wanted to reform the education system in Suriname. In 1998, she developed Fa yu e tron leisibakru (Sranan Tongo: How do you become a bookworm), a literary education method for secondary education. The literary education no longer solely focused on Dutch, but also Sranan Tongo, the creole spoken in Suriname, received emphasis. Moor considered it important that people learned about their own city, and their own culture.

In 2000, after her retirement as a teacher, she started to teach Dutch to the Tiriyó people in Kwamalasamutu, because Moor felt that education in the interior was being neglected. Moor remained the chief editor of De Ware Tijd Literair until her death.

On 9 March 2016, Moor died in Paramaribo at the age of 78.
