= Surinamese =

Surinamese may refer to:

- Something of, from, or related to the country of Suriname
- Surinamese people, people from Suriname, or of Surinamese descent
- Surinamese language (disambiguation)
