= Michaël Slory =

Surinamese poet (1935–2018)

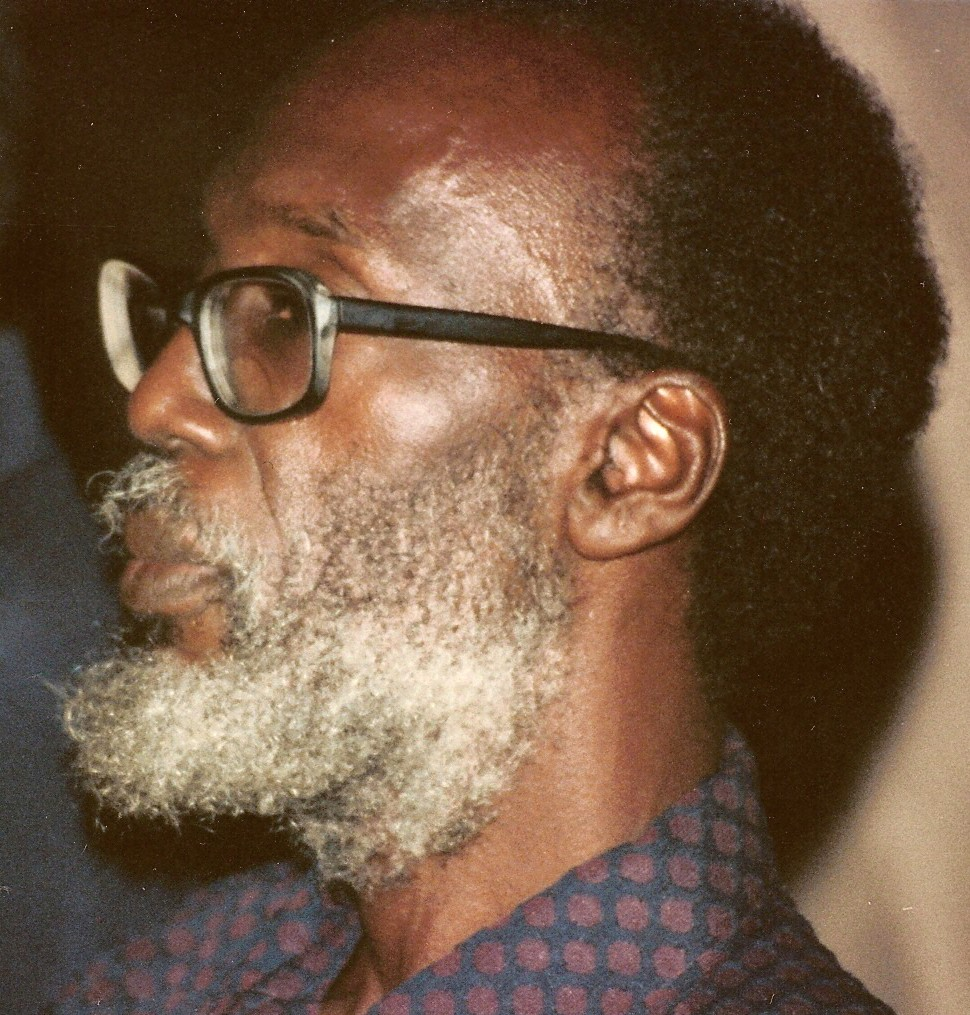
- Michaël Slory during the Suriname State Prize for Literature (1985)
- Born: Michaël Arnoldus Slory; 4 August 1935; Totness, Surinam
- Died: 19 December 2018 (aged 83); Paramaribo, Suriname
- Other name: Asjantenoe Sangodare
- Occupation: Poet
- Years active: 1961-2018
- Notable work: Sarka/Bittere strijd (1961); Fresko en Efu na Kodyo (1984)

Michaël Arnoldus Slory (4 August 1935 in Totness, Surinam – 19 December 2018 in Paramaribo, Suriname) was a Surinamese poet. He mainly wrote poetry in Sranan Tongo, and is considered one of the most important poets in Sranan Tongo. He also published in Dutch, English and Spanish

== Biography ==
In 1947, Slory moved to Paramaribo from his birth place Totness, and went to the Algemene Middelbare School which is comparable to high school, but does not qualify for university. His teacher encouraged him to write not only in Dutch, but also Sranan Tongo and Spanish. While in high school, he published his first three Dutch poems in the magazine Tongoni.

In 1958, Slory moved to Amsterdam to study a course in Spanish at a private school. After graduating, he enrolled in the University of Amsterdam where he joined Vereniging Ons Suriname. His poetry can be found in the yearbooks of the time. Ons Suriname was during that period, the centre for the Surinamese nationalist movement. Slory also gained access to the Dutch literary world, and befriended authors like Harry Mulisch and Hugo Claus.

In 1961, he published his first work Sarka / Bittere strijd under the pseudonym Asjantenoe Sangodare, with the communist publisher Pegasus. Sarka / Bittere strijd was bilingual with the poems printed both in Dutch and Sranan Tongo, and expressed his sympathy for Fidel Castro. The work is dedicated to Patrice Lumumba, and introduced by Theun de Vries. His scholarship was revoked in 1966, and Slory decided to focus on writing. He published Brieven aan de Guerrilla (1968), and Brieven aan Ho Tsji Minh (1968).

In 1970, Slory returned to Suriname and only wanted to write in Sranan Tongo. Slory started with Fraga mi wortoe (1970), and 20 more publications followed. His style started to change as well. The major themes are no longer nationalism and social equality, but love started to become a major theme in his poetry. Slory started to become disenchanted with the events after the independence of Suriname. In 1982, Slory had another change of mind, and started to write in Dutch and Spanish. He released Poemas contra la agonía (1988), Een andere weg (1991) among others. During his lifetime, he published more than 30 works, and several thousand poems.

In 1985, Slory was awarded the Suriname State Price for Literature for his love poem Fresko en Efu na Kodyo. In 1993, his poem Sarka was set to music by Gerda Geertens. In 1995, NPS created a television program about Michaël Slory En nu de droom over is.. de Surinaamse dichter Michael Slory. Even though Slory was lauded by literary critics, he always remained well below the poverty line, and often sold his books in the street. Slory was grateful that he received a monthly allowance from De Ware Tijd for his many contributions to DWT-Literair after retiring.

On 19 December 2018, Slory died in Paramaribo, and on 28 December received a state funeral.

== See also ==
- Surinamese literature
