= Henna Goudzand Nahar =

Surinamese fiction writer and journalist

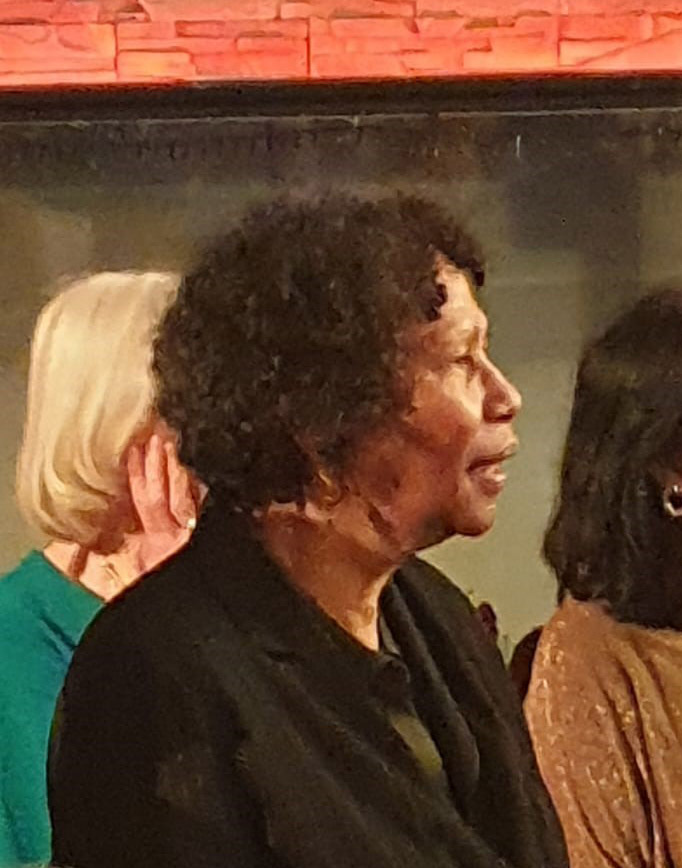
Image of Henna Goudzand Nahar

Henna Goudzand Nahar (born December 28, 1953) is a Surinamese fiction writer and journalist. She has written under the pen names Amber and Amber Nahar.

== Biography ==
Henna Goudzand Nahar was born in Paramaribo, Suriname, in 1953. She describes herself as being of African descent, with some Chinese, European, Jewish, and Indigenous ancestry. Her father, a teacher, provided her with early exposure to Dutch and Surinamese literature, and she began writing at a young age.

As a young woman, she worked as a Dutch teacher in her home city. Then, in 1989, she moved to the Netherlands, where she continued teaching Dutch in Amsterdam until her retirement.

Goudzand Nahar has published stories in the Surinamese women's magazine Brasa, as well as in the publications Preludium (1988), De Gids (1990), and De Groene Amsterdammer (1992). Her writing has also appeared in the anthologies Verhalen van Surinaamse schrijvers (1989), Hoor die tori! (1990), Sirito (1993), and Mama Sranan; 200 jaar Surinaamse verhaalkunst (1999). Her debut novel, Hele dagen in de regen, was published in 2005, followed by Over het zoute water (2015) and De geur van bruine bonen (2020).

She often writes under the pen name Amber or Amber Nahar. Her work frequently deals with migration between Suriname and the Netherlands, and the legacy of slavery in her home country.

Goudzand Nahar has also written children's literature, including the books Op zoek naar een vriend (1994), De Bonistraat (1996), Toch nog gelukkig (1996; with Baptista van Laerhoven), and De stem van Bever (2007; illustrated by Jeska Verstegen). She also worked on educational materials for Sesamstraat. In 2022, she won a Bronze Griffel for her 2021 story Op de rug van Bigi Kayman. Her most recent children's book, Suikerland (2023), tells the history of the Atlantic slave trade in Suriname.

As a journalist, she has contributed criticism and opinion pieces to the Surinamese publications De Ware Tijd Literair and Oso. Starting in 2009, she served as editor of the digital women's magazine Oer Digitaal Vrouwenblad.
