= Ramasha Media Group =

- Paramaribo; Suriname
- Broadcast area: Paramaribo
- Frequency: 88,9 MHz

Programming
- Languages: Dutch, Sarnami Hindustani
- Format: Full service

History
- First air date: 1999

Ramasha Media Group (RMG) is a Surinamese media company active on both radio (Radio Ramasha) and television (Ramasha TV).

It was founded in 1999 by Radj Oedit and is a subsidiary of his rice harvest company Dravin Holding in Saramacca District.

The company targets the Hindustani community in Dutch, Sranan Tongo and Sarnami Hindustani. It is a full service station with entertainment, sport, culture, cooking shows and Hindustani music. It has its own journalists covering regional news. It also carries a second station in English catering a wide audience. Politically, it is aligned to the National Democratic Party, where it produces talk show Bakana Tori.
