= Trishul Broadcasting Network =

- Paramaribo; Suriname
- Broadcast area: Paramaribo
- Frequency: 90.5 MHz (Paramaribo)

Programming
- Languages: Dutch, Sarnami Hindustani
- Format: Full service

Ownership
- Owner: The Broadcasting Network

History
- First air date: June 4, 1998 (radio); 1998 (television)

Trishul Broadcasting Network, better known as TBN or just Trishul, is a Surinamese radio and television network targeting the Hindu community. Its radio broadcasts started on June 4, 1998, and covers Commewijne, Paramaribo, Saramacca, Wanica and part of Para. It broadcasts in both Dutch and Sarnami Hindustani. TBN's TV channel operates on channel 20. It broadcasts in Dutch, Hindi and English.

In late 2013, a TBN crew visited Guyana to film a tourism documentary.

In 2015, it started airing the program of Stichting 1 Voor 10, after ATV ended its long-standing contract due to internal problems.

It signed an agreement with Natraj TV from the Netherlands in March 2021; Natraj's program could be seen on TBN's TV station. This was also a reciprocal agreement as Natraj TV would also air Zeg t maar from TBN for Surinamese immigrants in the Netherlands.

In May 2025, StarTV started broadcasting on channel 20.2, in the TBN multiplex.
