= Tessa Leuwsha =

Surinamese-Dutch writer

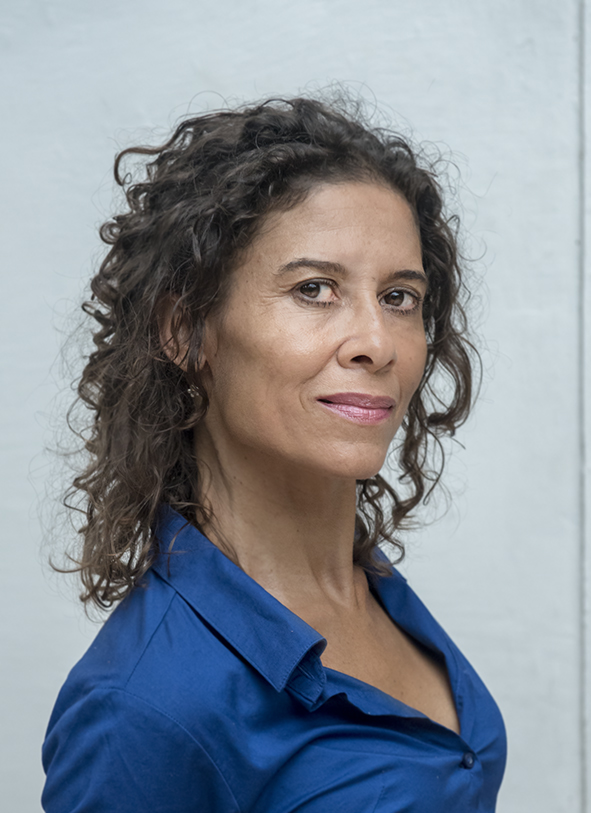
- 2019
- Born: Theresa Evelyne Leuwsha; 1 November 1967 (age 58); Amsterdam, Netherlands
- Occupation: Writer
- Notable work: De Parbo-blues

Theresa Evelyne Leuwsha (born 1 November 1967) is a Surinamese-Dutch writer.

== Biography ==
Tessa Leuwsha was born in Amsterdam, Netherlands as a daughter of an Afro-Surinamese father and a Dutch mother. She started her career as a ground stewardess for KLM. A publisher asked her to write a travel guide to Suriname, because the country supposedly had the best bami and roti. The guide which was first published in 1997 as Reishandboek Suriname, became a success. After many reprints, it has been renamed Wereldwijzer Suriname. In 1996, she moved to Suriname to become a freelance journalist writing for Opzij, de Volkskrant, and De Ware Tijd Literair among others.

In 2005, She made her debut as a literary writer with De Parbo-blues, a coming of age story with autobiographical elements: a girl from mixed parents leaves for Suriname to discover the history of her father who comforted his homesickness with music and marihuana. De Parbo-blues was well received, and was nominated for the ANV Debutants Award.

Leuwsha started to work for the Dutch Embassy in Paramaribo, continued her writing career with Solo, een liefde, and contributed to a reprint of Anton de Kom's classic Wij slaven van Suriname. In 2018, she wrote and directed Frits de Gids, a story about lovers caught between the western world and Maroon traditions, which was released by VPRO Cinema. In 2020, Leuwsha gave the sixth Cola Debrot Lectures which was pre-recorded and published on YouTube due to the COVID-19 pandemic.

In her 2020 novel Plantage Wildlust, Leuwsha did not focus just the known inequalities on a plantation in 1911, but also the subtle rivalry between freed slaves and the Indo-Surinamese contract workers, and the complex hierarchy between the owner and black supervisor. The supervisor being more experienced than the newly arrived owner expected to be in charge of the daily activities, and the owner inevitably resorted to cruelty to put him back in his place. The film rights for Plantage Wildlust have been bought by Staccato Films and will be turned into a full-length movie.

Leuwsha is married with two children.
