= Thea Doelwijt =

Surinamese writer and journalist

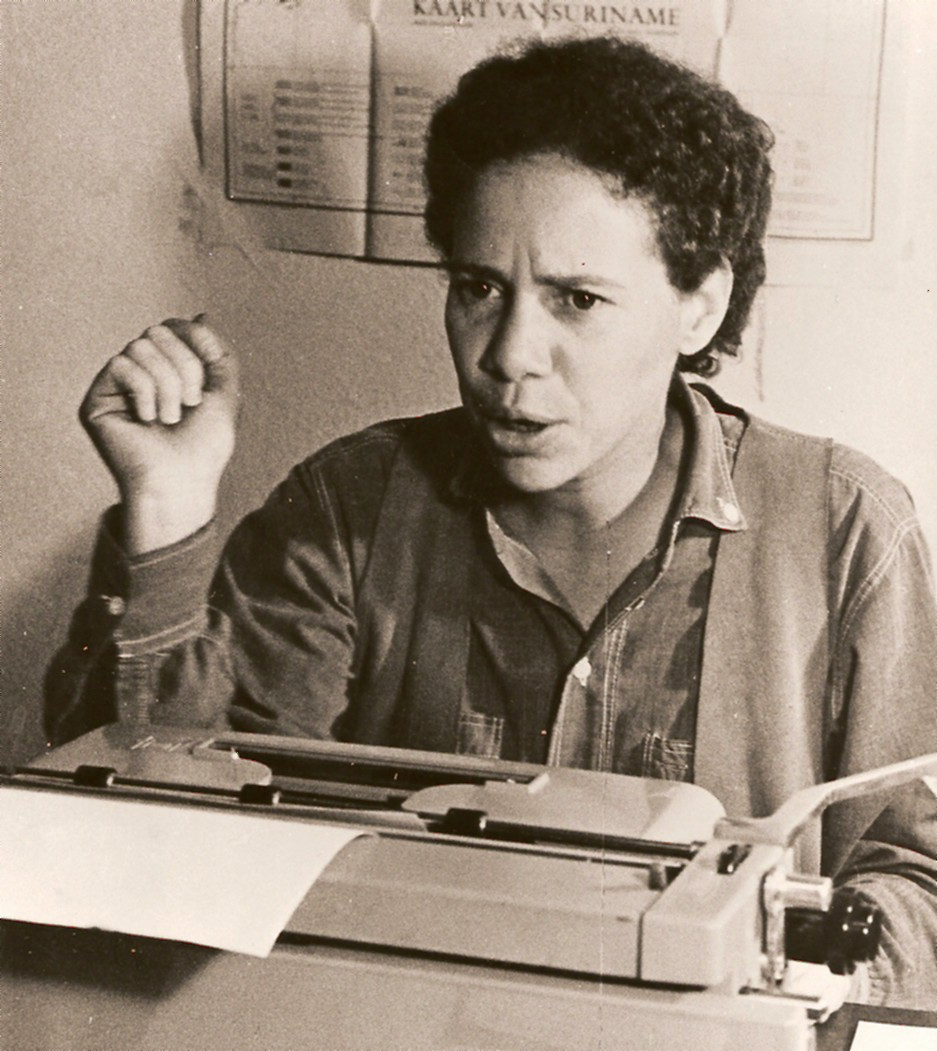
- Thea Doelwijt
- Born: Theodora Christina Doelwijt; December 3, 1938 (age 87); Den Helder, Netherlands
- Occupation: Writer

Thea Doelwijt (born December 3, 1938) is a Surinamese-Dutch writer.

== Life ==
Doelwijt's father was Surinamese and her mother was Dutch. She came to Suriname in 1961 where she worked as a journalist for the newspaper, Suriname. She was editor of the magazine, Moetete (1968–69). Doelwijt wrote two widely read novels, and in the 1970s and 1980s, she wrote many plays, musicals and cabaret acts, including A Fat Black Woman Like Me and Iris. She developed several important anthologies and wrote children's books. Doelwijt also contributed to the English-language anthology of Surinamese literature, Diversity is power (2007). As a writer-in-residence, Doelwijt developed major workshops in Suriname.

In 1974, she received the Governor Currie Prize. In 1982, after the December Murders, Doelwijt returned to the Netherlands, and became a full-time writer. In 1989, she received an award for her contribution to Surinamese culture. Since 1998, she has been a member of the Society of Dutch Literature. Doelwijt is a contemporary of Benny Ooft.

== Selected works ==
- De speelse revolutie (1967)
- Met weinig woorden (1968)
- Wajono (1969)
- Kri! kra! Proza van Suriname (1972)
- Toen Mathilde niet wilde ... (1972)
- Land te koop, (1973)
- Geen geraas of getier (1974)
- Kainema de Wreker en de menseneters (1977)
- Rebirth in words (1981)
- Iris (1987)
- Op zoek naar Mari Watson (1987)
- Cora-o (1988)
- Diversity is power (2007)
