= Apintie =

Coordinates: 5.820954°N 55.169835°W

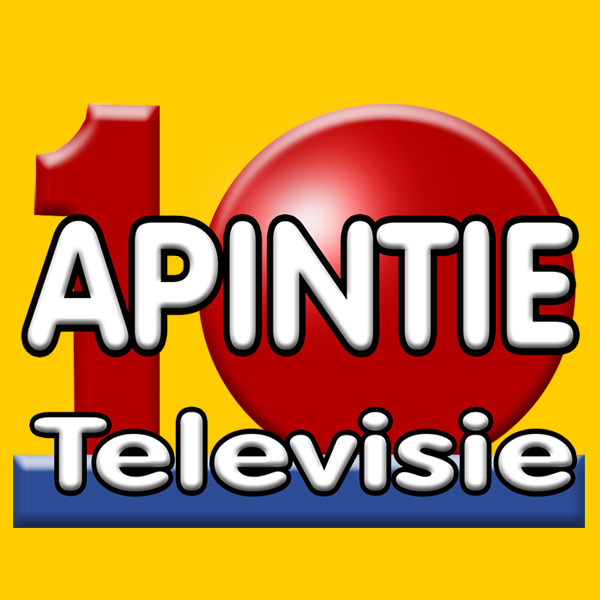
- Paramaribo; Suriname
- Broadcast area: Paramaribo, Albina, Nickerie, Moengo, Coronie, Wanica, Para
- Frequencies: 91.7 and 97.1 FM, TV channel 10

Programming
- Languages: Dutch, Sranan Tongo
- Format: AC, CHR

Ownership
- Owner: Apintie N.V

History
- First air date: 2 August 1958

Technical information
- ERP: 10 kW

Links
- Website: https://www.apintie.sr/

Apintie is a Surinamese television station and radio station broadcasting company in Paramaribo.

Apintie was founded by Charles Vervuurt and his son Eddy Vervuurt in 1958. Apintie is a Surinamese word for talking drum. The radio station was known for its sports reporting by André Kamperveen. After the 1980 Surinamese coup d'état, Apintie became critical of the military regime. On 8 September 1982, Apintie was taken off the air, and on 8 December 1982, Kamperveen was executed as part of the December murders. Apintie returned to the airwaves in 1984, and started broadcasting television in 1997.

== See also ==
- Willy Alberga
