= Gerda Geertens =

Dutch composer (born 1955)

Gerda Geertens (born 11 August 1955) is a Dutch composer. She was born in Wildervank, and studied music and philosophy in Groningen. In 1981 she began the study of composition with Klaas de Vries at the Rotterdam Conservatory. Her compositions include chamber music, choir and solo singing and pieces for symphony orchestras.

== Works ==
Geertens is noted for her chamber works. Selected works include:

- Sarka song cycle for soprano and piano, 1993: no. 1. Afrika (Michaël Arnoldus Slory), no. 2. Komoto te na Egypte (Michaël Arnoldus Slory), no. 3. Sarka (Michaël Arnoldus Slory)
- Nocturnal for flute, violin, violoncello, piano and percussion, 1994
- She Weeps Over Rahoon for solo piano, 1985
- Amarillis for 4 bamboo flutes (or recorders 4), 1985
- Ash and lilac , for instrumental ensemble, 1988
- Slinger, for string trio, 1989
- Contrast, for saxophone quartet, 1990
- Mexitli, Opus 1 for mixed choir and instrumental ensemble, 1981–1982, text: Theun de Vries
- Split country, for violin, bass clarinet and tape, 1992
- Leave it alone, audio clip, for 15 players, 1994
- Heartland, for orchestra, 1994
- Trope, for cello, 1987
- en SeringenI, for flute, oboe, clarinet, violin, viola, cello, piano, harp, and percussion, 1988
