= Hélène Ramjiawan =

Surinamese writer (1952–2021)

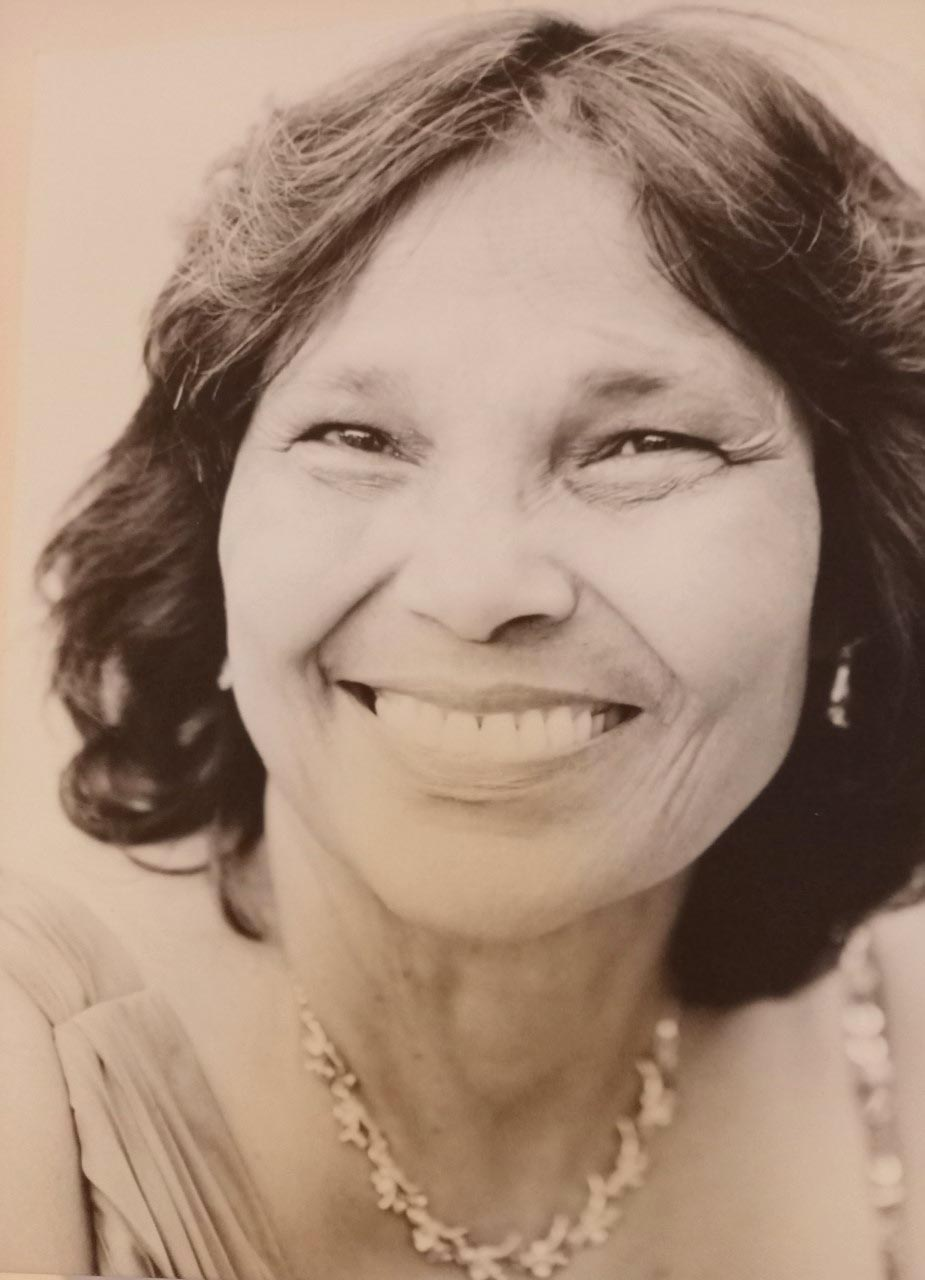
- Born: Lilawatie Hélène Ramjiawan; 20 February 1952; Paranam, Suriname
- Died: 18 June 2021 (aged 69); Almere, Netherlands
- Occupation: writer

Lilawatie Hélène Ramjiawan (20 February 1952 – 18 June 2021) was a Surinamese children's book author. She became known in the 1990s with her short stories for young readers about the girl "Poek".

== Biography ==
Lilawatie Hélène Ramjiawan was born in Paranam, Suriname on 20 February 1952. Her father Sewcharan Narain worked as a machine operator in the nearby Suralco bauxite mines. Her mother Boedhanie (Marie) Ramjiawan was a dressmaker.

Ramjiawan first worked as a primary-school teacher for one year at the Sacred Heart School in Paranam. She then taught English for six years at the Swami Dayanand MULO in Paramaribo. She had two children from her first marriage, a son and a daughter. Her daughter was the inspiration for her character "Poek".

Starting in 1990, Ramjiawan wrote a series of books which were illustrated by Steve Ammersingh. These books, centering around the young girl "Poek", were meant for young children who were learning to read. She also wrote two books of nursery rhymes, and one book for older children (Avonturen in Nickerie). Ismene Krishnadath included two short stories by Ramjiawan in her 1993 anthology of female Surinamese authors. Ramjiawan's short story "The Eye Doctor" was translated into English by Peter Constantine and published in a 1996 issue of The Caribbean Writer.

Ramjiawan and her children moved to the Netherlands in 1994, ending her work as a writer. For five years, she worked as a cleaner and at a day-care centre until she was able to find a position as a teacher in an Amsterdam school. She continued working there until her retirement in 2013. She married again in 2003, and was widowed in 2019.

Ramjiawan died in Almere in the Netherlands on 18 June 2021, aged 69, from cancer.

== Works ==
Title	Year	Age
Kan Poek al lezen?	1990	2-6 year
Poek en Flappie gaan op reis	1990	8-10 year
Poek en Sekre, de schildpad	1990	3-9 year
Poek ontmoet Loetie en Loekie	1991	9-11 year
Poek gaat vliegeren	1992	3-7 year
Kapitein Poek	1992	4-7 year
Rijmpjes voor het slapen gaan	1992	
Avonturen in Nickerie	1993	
Zonneschijn kleurboek	1994	
