= Ervin Tjon-A-Loi =

Surinamese footballer

Personal information
- Full name: Ervin Tjon-A-Loi
- Date of birth: 6 April 1995 (age 31)
- Place of birth: Totness, Suriname
- Height: 1.82 m (6 ft 0 in)
- Position: Midfielder

Team information
- Current team: Inter Moengotapoe

Senior career*
Years	Team	Apps	(Gls)
2015–2016	Leo Victor		
2016–2019	Transvaal		
2019–2021	West United		
2021–	Inter Moengotapoe		

International career
2018–2022	Suriname	10	(0)
- * Club domestic league appearances and goals

Ervin Tjon-A-Loi (born 6 April 1995) is a Surinamese professional footballer who plays as a midfielder for Suriname Major League club Inter Moengotapoe.

== International career ==
Tjon-A-Loi made his debut for Suriname in a 2–1 loss to Jamaica on 17 November 2018.

== Honours ==
Inter Moengotape

- SVB Cup: 2023
