= Surinamese language =

Surinamese language may refer to:

- Sarnami Hindustani
- Surinamese-Javanese
- Surinamese Dutch
- Sranan Tongo
