= Tammenga =

Coordinates: 5.81624°N 55.21466°W

- Resort
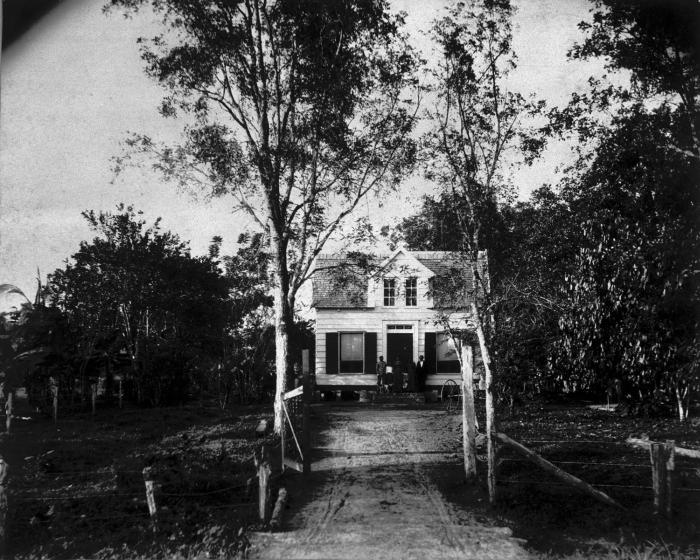
- Farm of the Tammenga family (~1895)

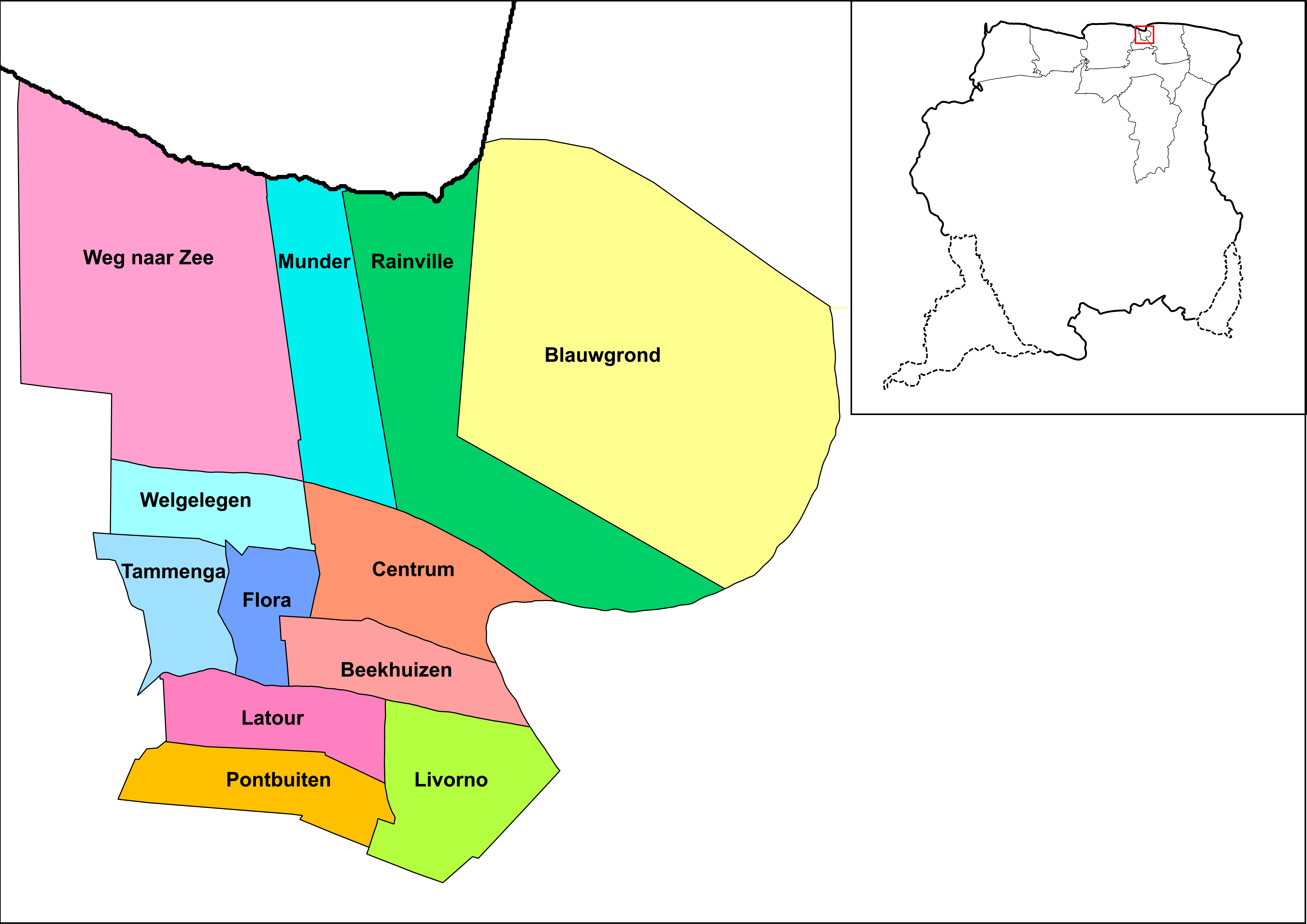
- Map showing the resorts of Paramaribo District. Tammenga
- Country: Suriname
- District: Paramaribo District

Area
  - Total: 6 km^{2} (2.3 sq mi)

Population (2012)
  - Total: 15,819
  - Density: 2,600/km^{2} (6,800/sq mi)
- Time zone: UTC-3 (AST)

Tammenga is a resort in Suriname, located in the Paramaribo District. Its population at the 2012 census was 15,819. The resort has been named after Henderijkes Tammenga (1815-1864), who after his first plantation did not succeed, started farming in a swampy area near Paramaribo in 1852. Most of the area was sold to East Indian indentured workers in the late 19th century.

== Notable people ==
- Bernardo Ashetu (1929-1982), writer.
