= Bernardo Ashetu =

Surinamese poet

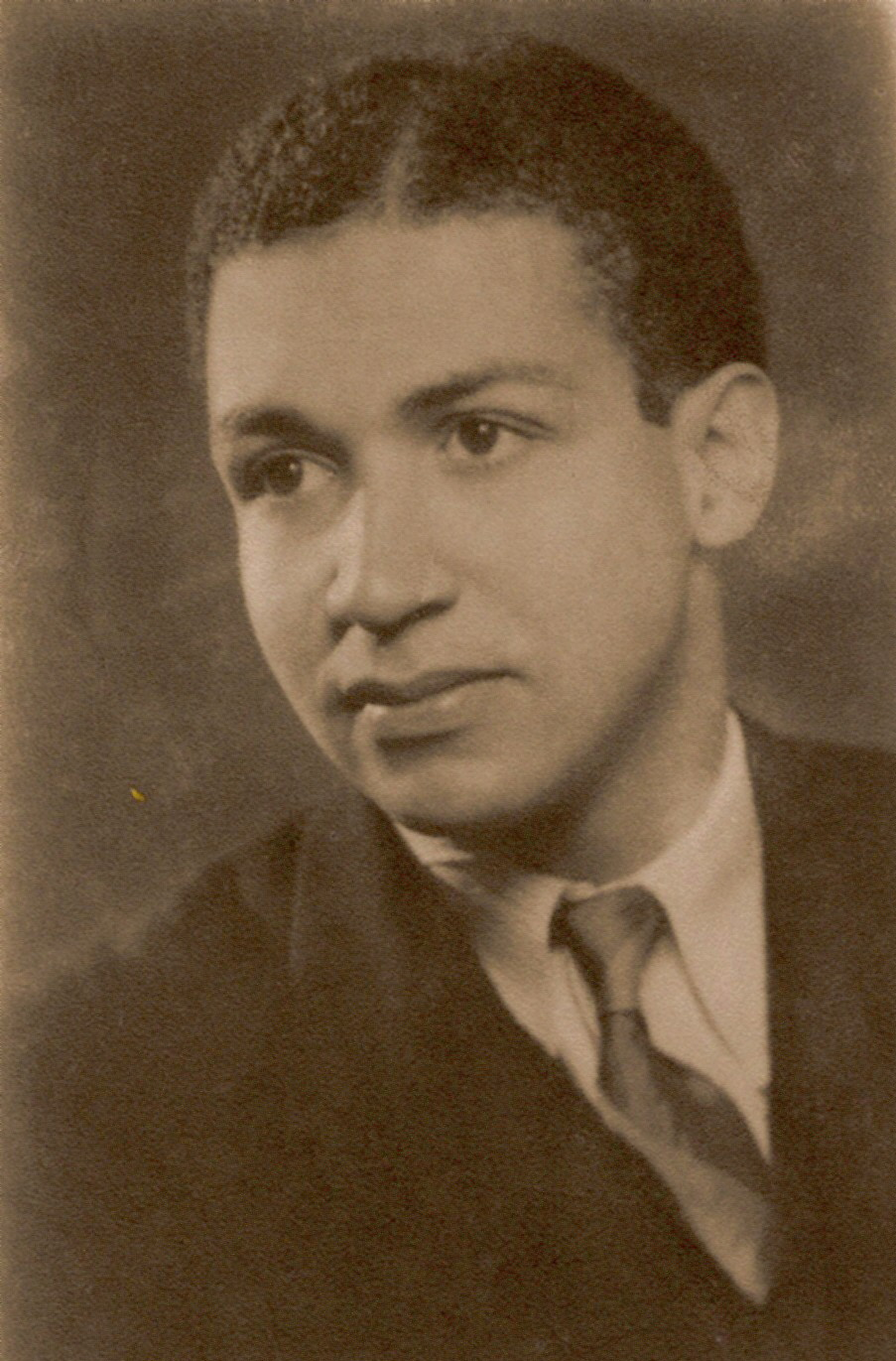
- Bernardo Ashetu (~1975)
- Born: Hendrik George van Ommeren; 4 March 1929; Kasabaholo, Paramaribo, Suriname
- Died: 3 August 1982 (aged 53); The Hague, Netherlands
- Other name: Kamanda
- Occupation: Poet

Bernardo Ashetu (4 March 1929 – 3 August 1982) was a Surinamese poet.

== Biography ==
Henk van Ommeren was born on the edge of Paramaribo as the son of doctor Hendrik van Ommeren who would later become Chairman of the Estates of Suriname. His son did not want to go to fancy schools and universities, he would later become a telegraphist, and sailor, and travel all over the world's oceans.

In 1959, van Ommeren settled in the Netherlands and started writing. In 1962, van Ommeren made his debut Yanacuna in the series Antilliaanse Cahiers under the pseudonym Bernardo Ashetu. Cola Debrot introduced him: "The title refers to the name of an Indian class of serfs, the Yanacuna, who were increasingly driven from their land and family after the destruction of the Inca society by the conquistadors." The collection contained 205 poems, and is well received, but Ashetu stopped publishing. He kept on writing, but never submitted them to a publisher. The legacy of his unpublished poems was handled by Michiel van Kempen. Van Ommeren never used the name Bernardo Ashetu in his other writings, and signed his letters Kamanda meaning "I am a negro." The name Kamanda is also mentioned on his grave.

Later the poetry started appearing in the Spiegel van de Surinaamse poëzie (1995) and magazines like Dietsche Warande, Bzzlletin, De Ware Tijd Literair, De Tweede Ronde, and many others. In 2002, a collection was published by Gerrit Komrij titled Dat ik zong., and in 2011, Michiel van Kempen published Dat ik je liefheb.
