= Chitra Gajadin =

Surinamese author of poetry, drama and prose

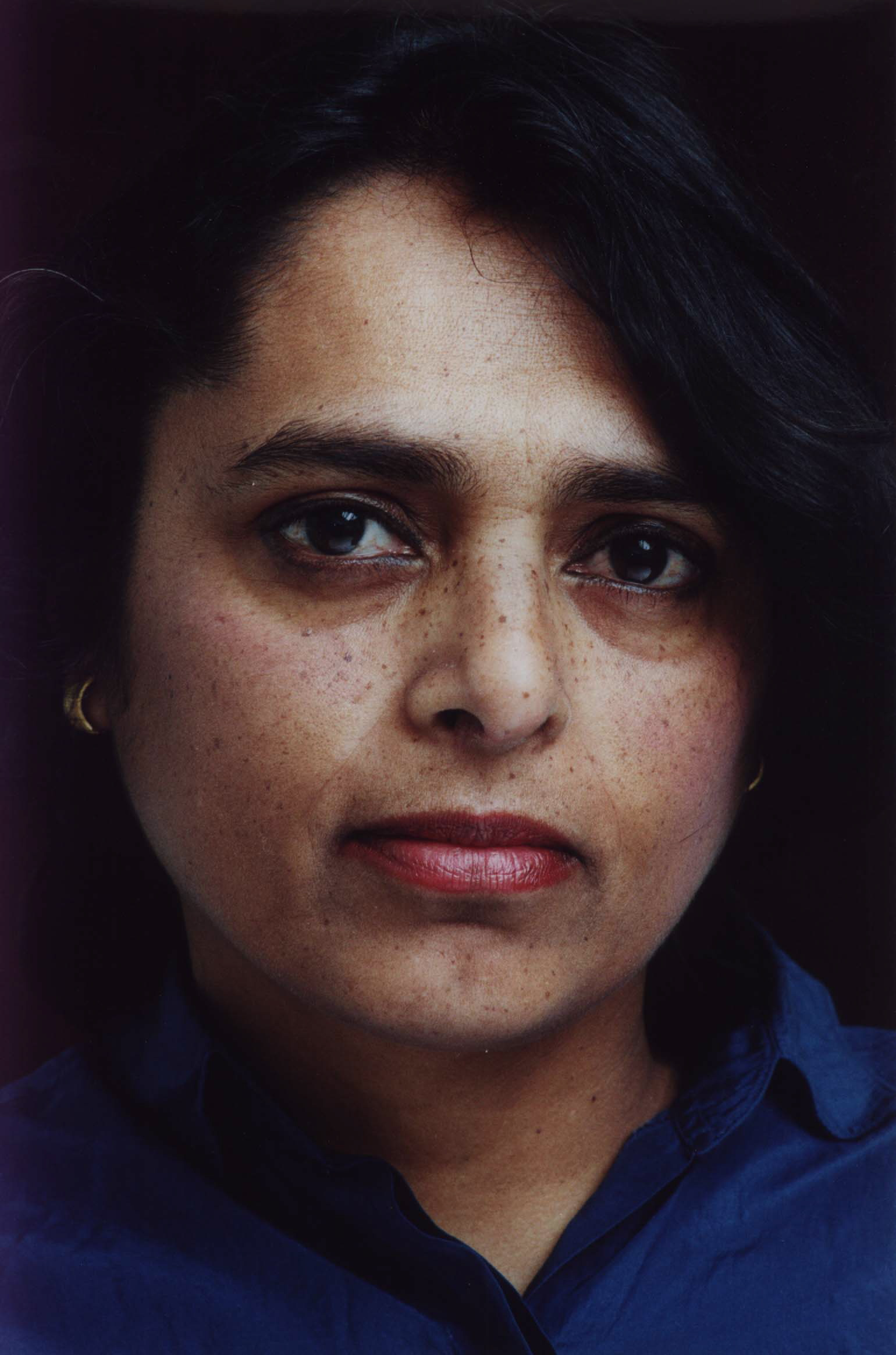
- Chitra Gajadin, c. 2002
- Born: 21 June 1954 (age 71); District Suriname, Surinam
- Occupations: writer, poet

Chitra Gajadin (born in District Suriname, 21 June 1954) is a Surinamese author of poetry, drama and prose. Though she lives in the Netherlands and her main literary language is Dutch, her expression of joy occurs when she is reminded of her native country. Gajadin worked as a reviewer for Weekkrant Suriname, in the public libraries, and for some magazines. Her poetry delves into themes of India and Hindu culture, where she describes sensitive and penetrating observances of Hindustani who left Suriname. Her poems display nostalgia for her youth in the district of Suriname and her experiences returning to her homeland after years of absence. As an Indo-Caribbean female poet, her contemporaries are Mahadai Das, Shana Yardan, Niala Maharaj, and Asha Radjkoemar.

== Selected works ==
- Van erf tot skai (1977)
- Padi voor Batavieren (1979)
- De zon vloeit weg uit mijn ogen (1983)
- Opgravingen van jezelf (1994)
- Schoorvoetige tijden (2000)

== Sources ==
- Michiel van Kempen, Chitra Gajadin. In: Kritisch Lexicon van de Moderne Nederlandstalige Literatuur, afl. 84, februari 2002. (Dutch language)
- Michiel van Kempen, Een geschiedenis van de Surinaamse literatuur. Breda: De Geus, 2003, deel II, pp. 1159–1164. (Dutch language)
- Michiel van Kempen, Surinaamse schrijvers en dichters (Amsterdam: De Arbeiderspers, 1989). (Dutch language)
