= Michiel van Kempen =

Dutch writer, art historian and literary critic

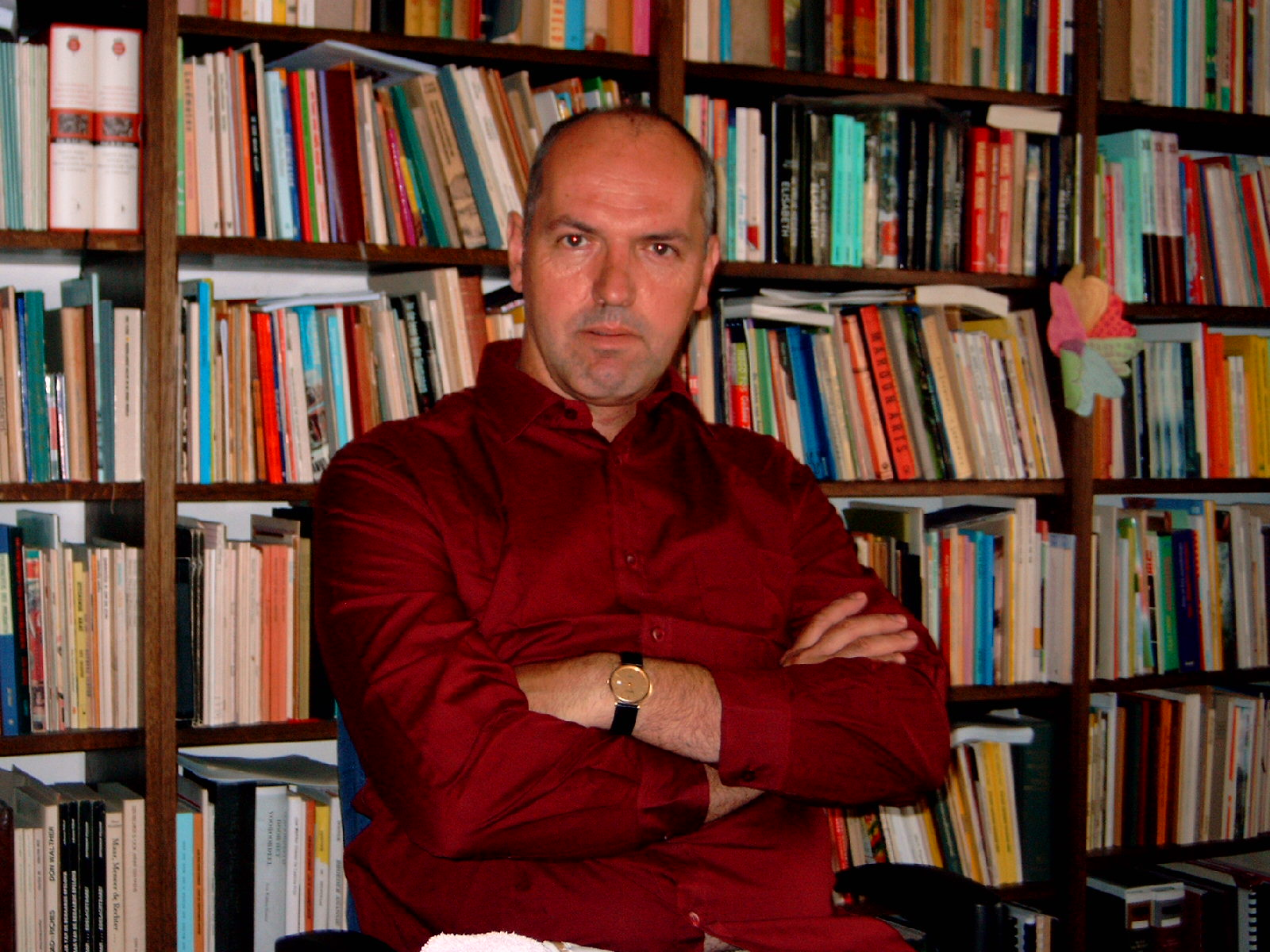
- Michiel van Kempen
- Born: Michaël Henricus Gertrudis van Kempen; 4 April 1957 (age 69); Oirschot, Netherlands
- Occupations: Writer, art historian and literary critic
- Writing career
- Language: Dutch
- Years active: 2003–present

Michaël Henricus Gertrudis (Michiel) van Kempen (born 4 April 1957) is a Dutch writer, art historian and literary critic. He has written novels, short stories, essays, travel literature and scenarios. He was the compiler of a huge range of anthologies of Dutch-Caribbean literature (Suriname, Netherlands Antilles) and wrote an extensive history of the literature of Suriname, in two volumes.

== Biography ==
Van Kempen was born in Oirschot. After attending high school in Eindhoven, he studied Dutch at the University of Nijmegen; on 5 June 2002 he got his Ph.D. at the University of Amsterdam with the five volumed Een geschiedenis van de Surinaamse literatuur (A History of Surinamese Literature), published in two volumes in 2003. In 1400 pages it tells the history of oral and written literatures of Suriname.

For some years Van Kempen was taught Dutch in Nijmegen (1980–1982) and Paramaribo, the capital of Suriname (1983–1987). In Suriname he also worked as a teacher in literary criticism and creative writing at the Academie voor Hoger Kunst- en Cultuuronderwijs, as well as coordinator of the Literature Section of the Ministry of Education and Culture.

From 1991 through 1995, he was coordinating the Suriname-project of the University Library of Amsterdam (resulting in the Suriname-catalogue, containing some 8000 entries) and from 1994 thru 1998 as a scientific researcher at the University of Amsterdam. As a lecturer and visiting professor, he taught at universities around the world. As an advisor, he worked for festivals, publishing houses and research fundings.

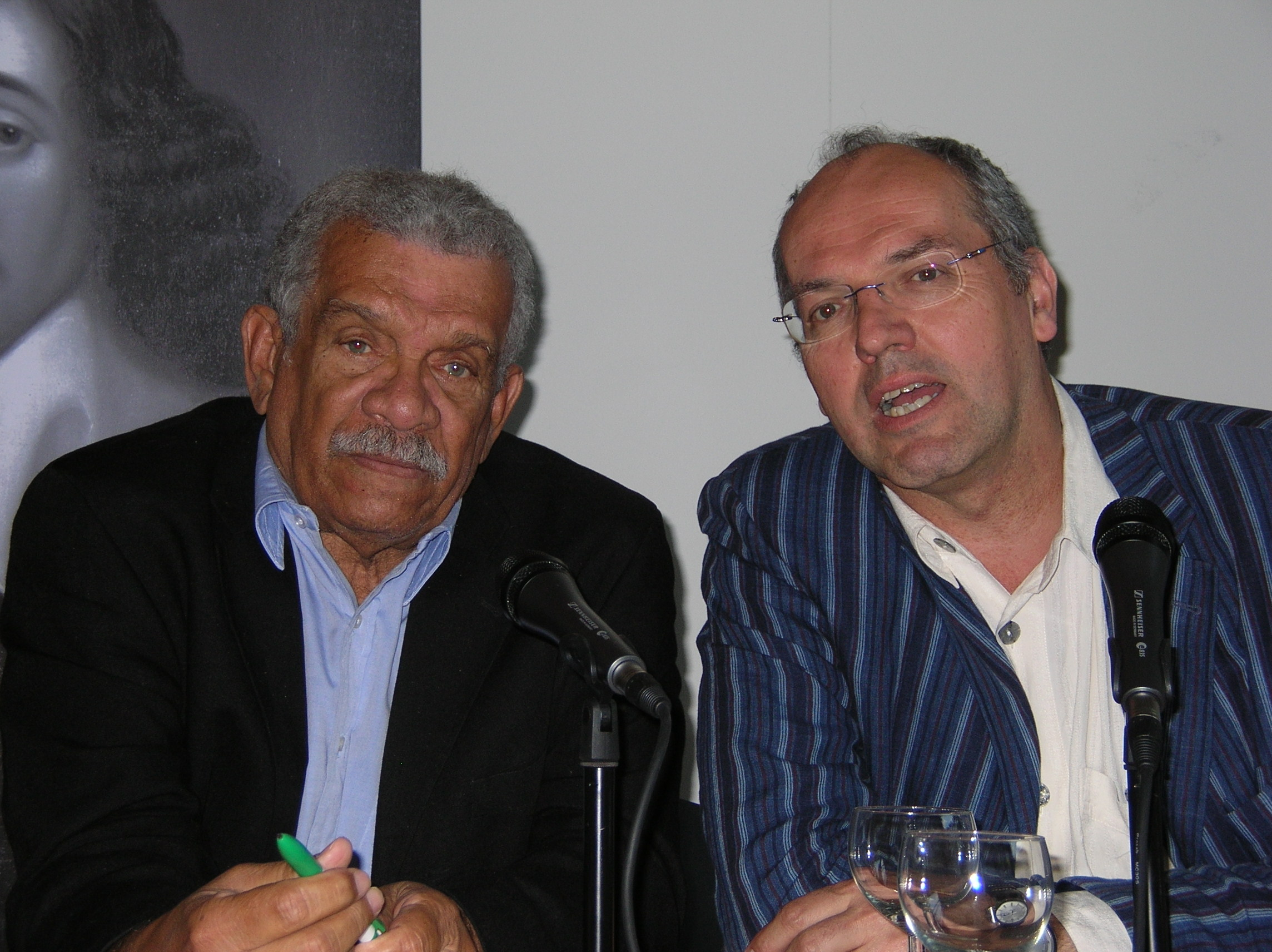
Van Kempen and Derek Walcott, Nobel Prize in Literature, in 2008; foto: Usha Marhé

From 1 September 2006, Van Kempen is a professor by special nomination in Dutch West-Indian literature at the University of Amsterdam.

== Stray essays ==
Michiel van Kempen was or is editor of several magazines, including Uit de Kunst, Tegenspraak and Oso (magazine for Surinamese studies). He made special issues for the literary magazines Deus ex Machina (1987), Preludium (1988), De Gids (1990) en Armada (1999). In 1986, he founded the weekly Literary Pages of De Ware Tijd, the largest newspaper of Suriname. Articles by his hand appeared in many literary magazines. His newspaper reviews were collected in De geest van Waraku (1993; The spirit of Waraku). Van Kempen was co-editor of two collections of scientific essays: Tussenfiguren (1988, Writers in between) en Wandelaar onder de palmen (2004, Walker under the palm trees).

== Studies on Dutch-Caribbean literature ==
With photographer Michel Szulc-Krzyzanowski Van Kempen published two photobooks: Woorden die diep wortelen (1992; also published in English as Deep-rooted words) on writers and storytellers in Suriname, and Woorden op de westenwind (1994; Words on the West Wind) on Surinamese writers outside their homeland. Six essays on Albert Helman were published in Kijk vreesloos in de spiegel (1998, Look fearless in the mirror). His extensive history of Surinamese literature was preceded by some other studies: De Surinaamse literatuur 1970-1985 (1987, Surinamese literature 1970-1985) and the popular Surinaamse schrijvers en dichters (1989, Surinames writes and poets). Major anthologies like Spiegel van de Surinaamse poëzie (1985, Mirror of the Surinamese poetry), Mama Sranan; 200 jaar Surinaamse verhaalkunst (1999, Mama Suriname, 200 years Surinamese narrative) en Noordoostpassanten; 400 jaar Nederlandse verhaalkunst over Suriname, de Nederlandse Antillen en Aruba (2005, North-east passers-by; 400 years narrative on Suriname, the Netherlands Antilles and Aruba) have greatly contributed to the knowledge of Dutch-Caribbean culture.

== Awards ==
For his merits to Surinamese literary life Van Kempen was awarded in 1987, de Rahmān Khān-prize. In 2004, he was awarded the Flemish/Dutch ANV-Visser Neerlandia-prize. He was knighted twice: in 2005, in Suriname as Officer of the Honorary Order of the Yellow Star and in 2007, in the Netherlands as Knight of the Order of Orange-Nassau. In 2009, he was awarded the Gaanman Gazon Matodja Award, the highest Maroons award.

== Literary work ==
Van Kempen's literary work comprises two novels, several collections of short stories and two children’s books. His narratives show how people of different cultural origins are being confronted with the impossibility of essentially getting in touch with the other. In the novel Plantage Lankmoedigheid (1997; Plantation Indulgence) this problem is thematized in a Surinamese setting in the years of the “revolution” and repression following the coup of 1980. Several of the short stories of Landmeten (1992, Land surveying) do have the same décor. The novel Vluchtwegen (2006, Escape routes) depicts the story of the immigrants quarter Bijlmermeer of Amsterdam. In the title story of Pakistaanse nacht en andere verhalen (2002, Pakistan night and other stories) a European couple on a journey through Pakistan sees itself confronted with a retired army colonel, who seems to keep up a hidden agenda. Het Nirwana is een lege trein (1990, The Nirwana is an empty train) is a collection of travel stories on India.

== Bibliography ==
=== Prose ===
- Windstreken. De Volksboekwinkel, Amsterdam 1992. (short stories)
- Bijlmer, oh Bijlmer! Wilfred du Bois & Margriet Walinga, Amsterdam 1993. (short stories)
- Ik ben Nalini en ik ben een buitenbeentje. Kennedy Stichting, Paramaribo 1993. (short story)
- Plantage Lankmoedigheid; roman. In de Knipscheer, Haarlem 1997. (novel)
- Het Nirwana is een lege trein: reisverhalen over India. In de Knipscheer, Amsterdam 2000. (travel story)
- Pakistaanse nacht en andere verhalen. In de Knipscheer, Haarlem 2002. (short stories)
- Vluchtwegen. De Geus, Breda 2006. (novel)

=== Prose under pseudonym ===
- Mani Sapotille, Het tweede gezicht. De Volksboekwinkel, Paramaribo 1985. (youth literature)
- Winston Leeflang, Landmeten. In de Knipscheer, Amsterdam 1992. (short stories)
- Winston Leeflang, Heer Slaapslurf. Lees Mee, Paramaribo 1993. (children’s book)

=== Poetry ===
- Wat geen teken is maar leeft. In de Knipscheer, Haarlem 2012.

=== Literary criticism ===
- De knuppel in het doksenhok. De Volksboekwinkel, Paramaribo 1987. (essay)
- De Surinaamse Literatuur 1970-1985, een documentatie. De Volksboekwinkel, Paramaribo 1987.
- Surinaamse schrijvers en dichters. De Arbeiderspers, Amsterdam 1989.
- Woorden die diep wortelen. Fotografie: Michel Szulc-Krzyzanowski. Teksten: Michiel van Kempen. Voetnoot, Amsterdam 1992. (English translation: Deep-rooted words. Photography: Michel Szulc-Krzyzanowski. Texts: Michiel van Kempen. Translation: Sam Garrett. Voetnoot, Amsterdam 1992.)
- De geest van Waraku; kritieken over Surinaamse literatuur. Zuid, Haarlem/Brussel 1993. (literary reviews)
- Woorden op de westenwind. Fotografie: Michel Szulc-Krzyzanowski. Teksten: Michiel van Kempen. In de Knipscheer, Amsterdam 1994.
- Suriname verbeeld. Amsterdam: Vrienden van de Universiteitsbibliotheek, 1995. (essay)
- Suriname-Catalogus van de Universiteitsbibliotheek van Amsterdam. Samengesteld door Kees van Doorne en Michiel van Kempen. Universiteitsbibliotheek van Amsterdam, Amsterdam 1995.
- Kijk vreesloos in de spiegel; Albert Helman 1903-1996. In de Knipscheer, Haarlem 1998. (essays)
- Tussenfiguren; schrijvers tussen de culturen. Edited with Elisabeth Leijnse. Het Spinhuis, Amsterdam 1998; aangevulde herdruk 2001. (essays)
- Tussen droom en werkelijkheid: een keuze uit de literaire pagina van de Ware Tijd. Okopipi, Paramaribo 2001. (essays, with others)
- Wandelaar onder de palmen; opstellen over koloniale en postkoloniale literatuur en cultuur; opgedragen aan Bert Paasman. Edited with Piet Verkruijsse and Adrienne Zuiderweg. KITLV, Leiden 2004. (Boekerij 'Oost en West'.)
- Een geschiedenis van de Surinaamse literatuur. Okopipi, Paramaribo 2002. (Ph.D.-thesis; 5 vols.)
- Een geschiedenis van de Surinaamse literatuur. De Geus, Breda 2003. (commercial edition of the Ph.D.-thesis in 2 vols.)
- Welcome to the Caribbean, darling! De toeristenblik in teksten uit de (voormalige) Nederlandse West. Vossiuspers UvA, Amsterdam 2007. (inaugural lecture)

=== Essays ===
- Cityscapes + birdmen. Photography Jacquie Maria Wessels. Text Michiel van Kempen. Voetnoot, Antwerpen 2010.

=== Anthologies ===
- Helias achterna. Dekker & Van de Vegt, Nijmegen 1984. (history of the literature in Nijmegen, edited with Margreet Janssen Reinen)
- Nieuwe Surinaamse Verhalen. De Volksboekwinkel, Paramaribo 1986.
- Verhalen van Surinaamse schrijvers. De Arbeiderspers, Amsterdam 1989.
- Hoor die tori! Surinaamse vertellingen. In de Knipscheer, Amsterdam 1990.
- Ander geluid. Nederlandstalige literatuur uit Suriname. Ed. Jos de Roo in cooperation with Michiel van Kempen and F. Steegh. Coördinaat Minderheden Studies Rijksuniversiteit Leiden, Leiden 1991.
- Michaël Slory, Ik zal zingen om de zon te laten opkomen. In de Knipscheer, Amsterdam 1991.
- Het Verhaal Aarde. Bridges Books/Novib, Den Haag/Amsterdam 1992.
- Sirito. Vertellingen van Surinaamse bodem. Kennedy-stichting, Paramaribo 1993.
- Privé Domein van de Surinaamse letteren; Het Surinaamse literatuurbedrijf in egodocumenten en verspreide teksten. Surinaams Museum, Paramaribo 1993.
- Albert Helman, Adyosi/Afscheid. Stichting IBS, Nijmegen 1994. (text edition)
- Spiegel van de Surinaamse poëzie. Bijeengebracht, van een inleiding en aantekeningen voorzien door Michiel van Kempen. Meulenhoff, Amsterdam 1995.
- Eeuwig Eldorado. Boekenweekmagazine 1996. CPNB, Amsterdam 1996. (ed. with others)
- Vrijpostige kwatrijnen: een huldebundel voor Hugo Pos. In de Knipscheer, Haarlem 1998.
- Cándani, Zal ik terugkeren als je bruid. Amsterdam 1999.
- Mama Sranan: twee eeuwen Surinaamse verhaalkunst. Contact, Amsterdam 1999, herdruk 2002.
- Michaël Slory, In de straten en in de bladeren. Paramaribo 2000.
- Een geparkeerde kameel: gedichten van Kamil Aydemir e.a. Dunya, Rotterdam 2002.
- Bernardo Ashetu, Marcel en andere gedichten. Okopipi, Paramaribo 2002.
- Het dolpension van de hemel. Dunya Poëzieprijs 2002. Bekroonde gedichten en ander werk van de prijswinnaars. Martijn Benders [e.a.]. Bèta Imaginations/Stichting Dunya, Rotterdam 2003. (Dromologya 12.)
- Septentrion, 33 (2004), no. 1, 1er trimestre. (introduction and texts)
- Literatuur & maatschappij. [Special issue of] Oso, tijdschrift voor Surinamistiek, 23 (2004), nr. 1, mei. (ed. with Peter Meel)
- Noordoostpassanten; 400 jaar Nederlandse verhaalkunst over Suriname, de Nederlandse Antillen en Aruba. Samengesteld, ingeleid en van aantekeningen voorzien door Michiel van Kempen en Wim Rutgers. Contact, Amsterdam 2005.
- Shrinivási 80 Jubileumbundel. Ed. by Michiel van Kempen & Effendi N. Ketwaru. Paramaribo 2006.
- Voor mij ben je hier; verhalen van de jongste generatie Surinaamse schrijvers. Meulenhoff, Amsterdam 2010.
- Bernardo Ashetu, Dat ik je liefheb; gedichten. In de Knipscheer, Haarlem 2011.

=== Translations ===
- Jit Narain, Waar Ben Je Daar/Báte huwán tu kahán. SSN, Paramaribo 1987. (introduction)
- Kardi Kartowidjojo, Kèhèng. Afd. Cultuurstudies Ministerie van Onderwijs, Paramaribo 1988. (with Johan Sarmo and Hein Vruggink)
- Kamala Sukul, Wandana. 's-Gravenhage 1989.
- Cándani, Ghunghru tut gail/ De rinkelband is gebroken. NBLC/ De Volksboekwinkel, 's-Gravenhage/Paramaribo 1990.

=== Theatre ===
- De telefoon (1992).
- Burenruzies (1994).
- De eer van het lintje (1994, staged by Felix Burleson).
- Maatpak (staged by Felix Burleson, Rotterdam, February 2003)

=== Scenarios ===
- Brokopondo, verhalen van een verdronken land. (dir. by John Albert Jansen, broadcast VARA, 1994).
- En nu de droom over is... De dichter Michaël Slory. (dir. by John Albert Jansen, broadcast by VARA, 1996).
- Shrinivási: verlangen niet en eindelijk geen verdriet (dir. by Ram Soekhoe and Elles Tukker, OHM, 2001). (cooperation)
- Wie Eegie Sanie (dir. by John Albert Jansen, NPS, 2004). (cooperation)

== On-line texts ==
- Complete text of Een geschiedenis van de Surinaamse literatuur (Ph.D.-thesis, Dutch)
