= Emily Cordner-Pinkerton =

Irish publisher (c.1859–1902)

- Born: c. 1859; Newry, County Down
- Died: 2 August 1902 (aged 42–43)
- Occupation: Publisher

Emily Cordner-Pinkerton (c. 1859–1902) was an Irish publisher.

== Life ==
Emily Cordner-Pinkerton was born Emily Cordner, probably in Newry, County Down, in around 1859. Her parents, William Henry and Matilda Cordner (née McCracken), owned a jewellery and watchmaker's shop. She had at least three brothers. As a child, Cordner-Pinkerton contracted rheumatic fever, which resulted in a weakened heart and affected her health for her entire life. For a time after her father's death, she taught music. On 31 January 1894 she married Rev. Samuel Pinkerton who was the minister of 1st Newry Presbyterian church. Samuel added his wife's name to his own, which was rather unusual for the time. Both of them were interested in Irish nationalism, particularly in the work of John Mitchel and John Martin.

In 1897, Cordner-Pinkerton began publishing with the first of five annuals, The open window. They contained local interest, Irish language and historical articles, reflections on life at the time, as well as advertising. The annuals contained many photographs, with some taken by Cordner-Pinkerton and her husband. Contemporary reviews praised the annual for preserving local knowledge for the children of the Newry area, and its rich illustration.

Alongside her publishing, she also conducted her duties as a minister's wife. The couple had two sons and two daughters. The multiple pregnancies further weakened her heart, and she died of heart failure on 2 August 1902.
