= Marylin Simons =

Surinamese writer (Surinamese writer (born 1959)

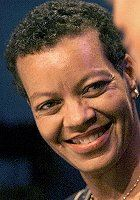
- Born: 16 October 1959 (age 66); Paramaribo, Suriname
- Occupations: Writer and columnist
- Notable work: In naam van God en Obia (2002); Carrousel (2003)

Marylin Simons (born 16 October 1959) is a Surinamese writer and columnist. She is best known for In naam van God en Obia (2002), for which she was awarded the Kwaku Literature Prize, and her youth book Carrousel (2003).

== Biography ==
Marilyn Simons was born on 16 October 1959 in Paramaribo, Suriname. She went to the Netherlands to study higher vocational education. After graduating, she returned to Suriname in 1982.

Simons started to work as a columnist for the magazine De Tweede Ronde, and the newspaper De Ware Tijd. Simons made her literary debut in 2001, at De Tweede Ronde, and won the story-writing contest for the 700th edition of De Ware Tijd Literair.

In 2002, Simons wrote In naam van God en Obia (In name of God and Obia), a family drama, for which she was awarded the Kwaku Literature Prize, a former stimulus prize for Surinamese authors. In 2003, she wrote Carrousel which was originally published by Okopipi in Paramaribo, but has become better known as Koorddansers (2006), an extended republication by the Dutch publisher De Geus. The book is intended for both adults and youths. In 2004, Simons released Anansi Dala, a picture book about the spider Anansi.

Simons writes stories on breaking taboos and her characters show the diversity in Surinamese Dutch, which alternates from Sranan Tongo to "Algemeen Beschaafd Nederlands", the old term for posh civilized Dutch.
