= Michel Szulc-Krzyzanowski =

Dutch photographer

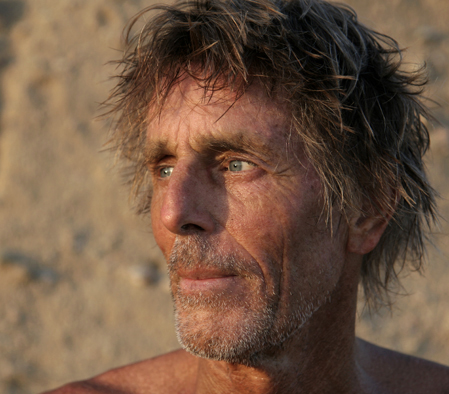
Michel Szulc-Krzyzanowski, © Merel Waagmeester, 2010

Michel Szulc-Krzyzanowski (born 23 April 1949, in Oosterhout), is a Dutch photographic artist, possibly best known for his series of photographs of a Dutch woman, Henny, whom he has been documenting since the 1970s.
