= Bhai (writer) =

Surinamese poet (1935–2018)

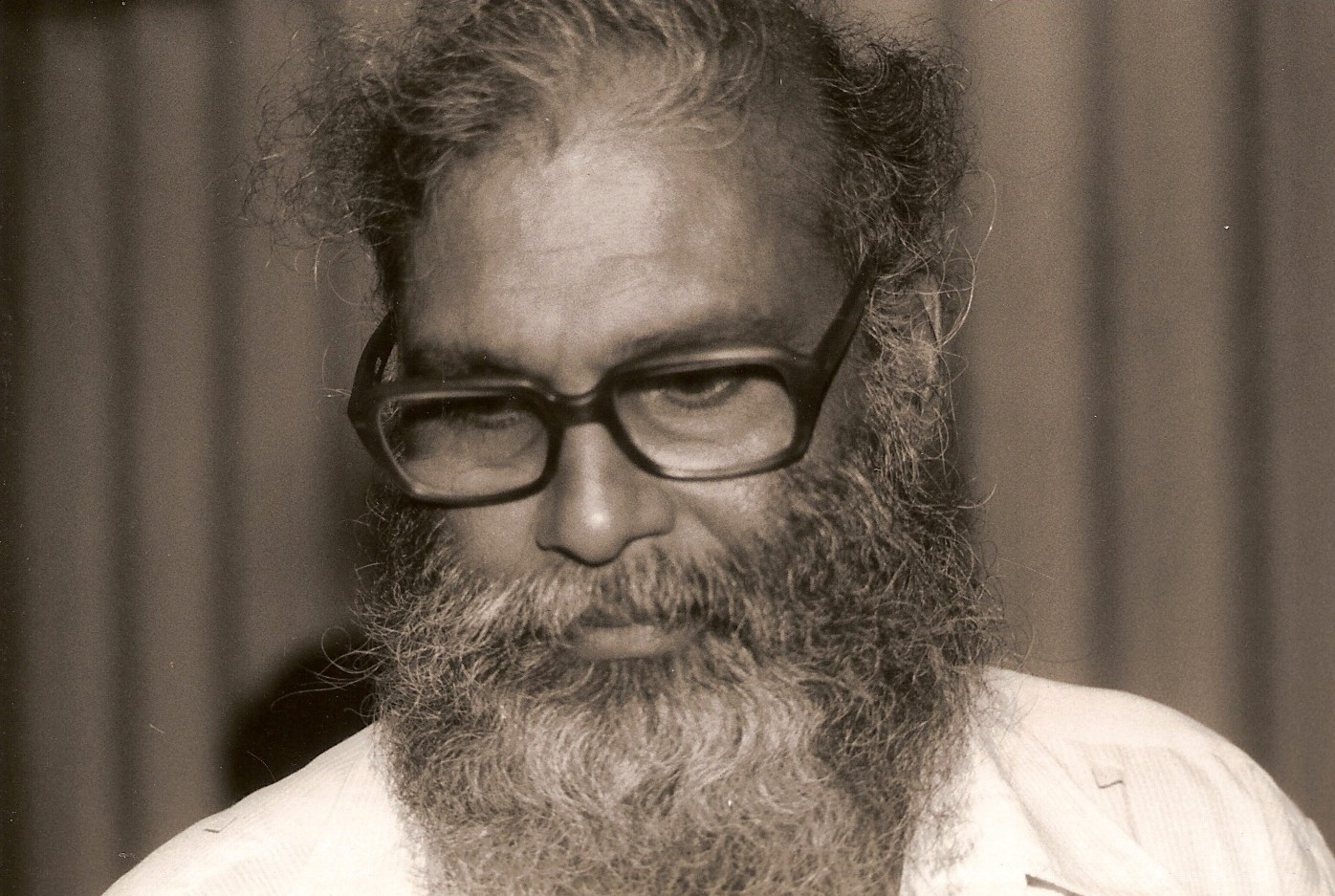
- Bhai in 1987
- Born: James Ramlall; 26 January 1935; District Suriname, Suriname
- Died: 19 December 2018 (aged 83); Paramaribo, Suriname
- Occupations: Teacher, poet

James Ramlall, also known as Bhai (26 January 1935 – 19 December 2018), was a Surinamese poet.

== Biography ==
Bhai was born in the former district Suriname. After getting his teaching degree, he became a teacher at an elementary school in Harmelen, Netherlands. After three years of teaching, he decided to become a student. First he studied Dutch language and literature, and pedagogy. Later he went on to study Indian philosophy and religion, and wrote his doctoral thesis on "The Problem of Being in Heidegger and Sankara".

When Bhai returned to his native Suriname, he became Assistant Director of Culture and later Director of Culture of the Surinamese Ministry of Education and Culture, and showed himself very active in the cultural world. He founded the conference center "Caribbean Centre" in Lelydorp.

Bhai wrote poetry mainly in Dutch, but some was in Hindi, which was published in the magazine Soela. The poetry can be described as philosophical and meditative. The pseudonym which used was 'Bhai' meaning brother, and brotherhood is a theme found throughout his poetry. The Dutch work was bundled into Vindu (Hindi for: Secret, 1982) from which the concrete-imaging of his earlier poetry completely disappeared. For this bundle, Bhai received the Literature Prize of Suriname 1980-1982. Since then he turned to poetry, although he sporadically wrote for De Ware Tijd Literair.

In 2003, Bhai received the Gaanman Gazon Matodja Award. He died on 19 December 2018 at the age of 83.

== See also ==
- Surinamese literature

== Sources ==
- Michiel van Kempen, Een geschiedenis van de Surinaamse literatuur. Breda: De Geus, 2003, deel II, pp. 814–816.
- Michiel van Kempen, Surinaamse schrijvers en dichters (Amsterdam: De Arbeiderspers, 1989).
