= Sarnami Hindustani =

Indo-Aryan koiné language of Suriname

Sarnámi Hindustáni
- Surinamese Hindustani; Surinaams Hindoestaans (in Dutch)
- सरनामी हिन्दुस्तानी سرنامی ہندوستانی
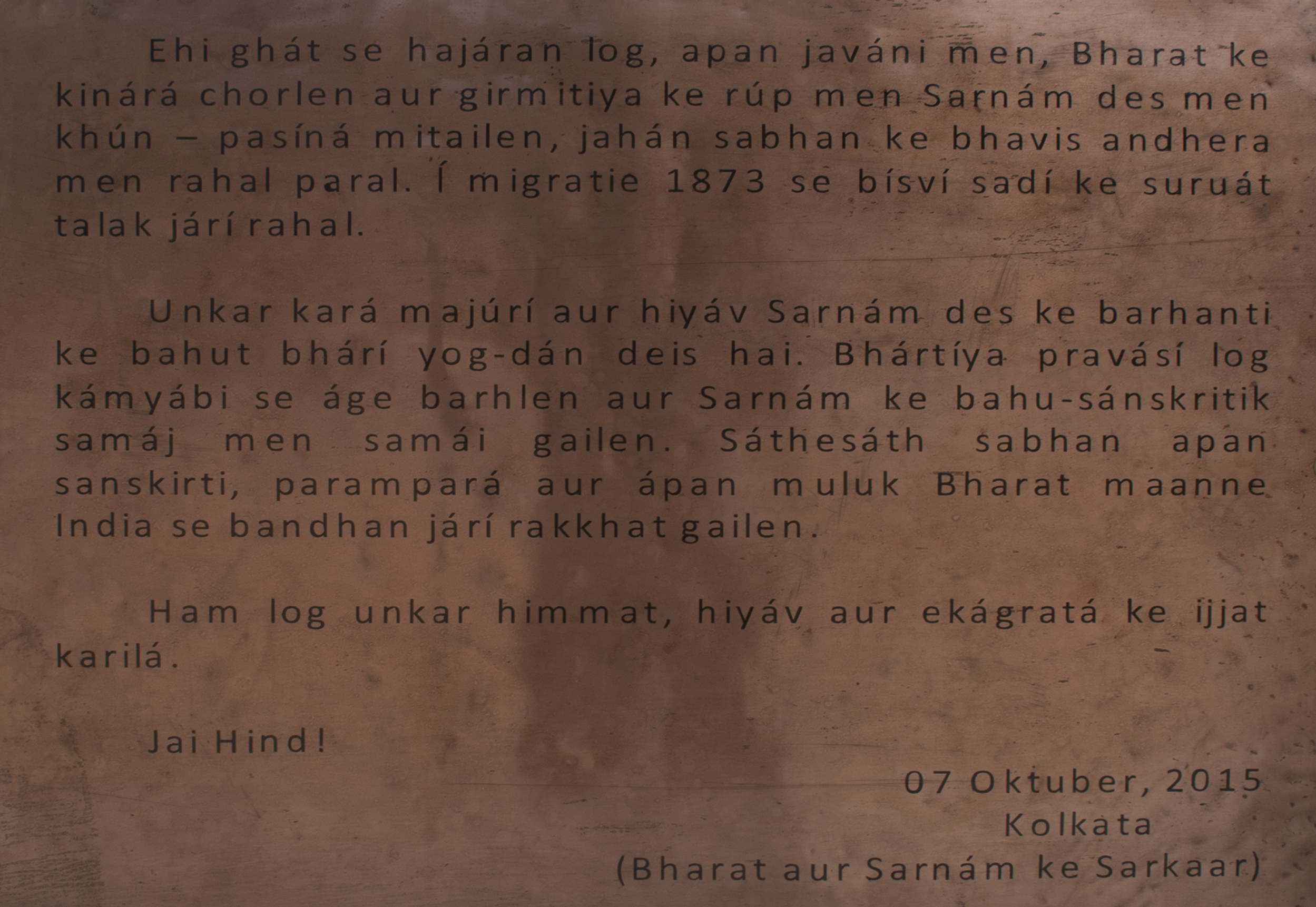
- Sarnami Hindustani (in Latin) plaque at Suriname Memorial, Garden Reach, Kolkata, West Bengal, India
- Native to: Suriname
- Ethnicity: Indo-Surinamese people
- Native speakers: 150,000 in Suriname (2018)
- Language family: Indo-European: Indo-Iranian; Indo-Aryan; Eastern and Central; Bihari, Eastern Hindi and Western Hindi; Bhojpuri, Awadhi and Hindustani (Note: Only Bhojpuri and Awadhi descend from Bihari and Eastern Hindi, Hindustani comes from Western Hindi); Caribbean Hindustani; Sarnámi Hindustáni
- Early forms: Proto-Indo-European: Proto-Indo-Iranian; Proto-Indo-Aryan; Vedic Sanskrit; Classical Sanskrit; Magadhi and Ardhamagadhi Prakrit (Note: Bhojpuri is descended from Magadhi Prakrit and Awadhi is descended from Ardhamagadhi Prakrit); Magadhan and Ardhamagadhi Apabhraṃśa (Note: Bhojpuri is descended from Magadhan Apabhraṃśa and Awadhi is descended from Ardhamagadhi Apabhraṃśa); Abahattha (Note: Only Bhojpuri is descended from Abahattha, not Awadhi. Awadhi comes straight from Ardhamagadhi Apabhraṃśa, while Hindustani come straight from Apabhraṃśa); Bhojpuri, Awadhi and Hindustani
- Dialects: Paramaribo dialect; Nickerian dialect
- Writing system: Devanagari; Latin; Perso-Arabic (Note: Nastaliq calligraphic hand, Urdu alphabet)

Language codes
- ISO 639-3: –
- IETF: hns-SR

Sarnámi Hindustáni (Sarnami Hindustani, Sarnami Hindoestani, Sarnami; Dutch: Surinaams Hindoestaans) is an Indo-Aryan koiné language and the Surinamese variety of Caribbean Hindustani. The language originated from a mixture of the various languages and dialects spoken by British Indian indentured labourers. The Indo-Aryan languages that formed the basis for the development of Sarnami consist of Bhojpuri, Awadhi and Hindustani (Hindi–Urdu), and to a lesser degree from other Bihari and Hindi languages, such as Magahi, Maithili, Bundeli, Bagheli, Bajjika, Angika, and Braj. It also contains Influence and vocabulary taken from Dutch, English, and to a lesser extent Portuguese and loanwords from other Surinamese languages such as Sranan Tongo.

Sarnami is considered to be the mother tongue of the Indo-Surinamese people and is mainly spoken in the Nickerie and Saramacca districts of Suriname, and due to migration in the Netherlands, Netherlands Antilles, Guyana, United States, Canada, and French Guiana.

== Origins ==
The word Sarnami literally means Surinamese. The name Sarnami Hindustani was first used in 1961 by Jnan Hansdev Adhin.

The language emerged mainly through the mixing of different dialects or language variants from Northern India and southern Nepal, the areas from which the approximately 34,000 indentured labourers were brought to Suriname between 1873 and 1916 by the Dutch colonial government via the British, to replace the African slaves who had been freed.

== Usage ==
Sarnami is the third-most spoken language in Suriname after Dutch and Sranan Tongo and the mother tongue of approximately 500,000 of the Surinamese diaspora. Sarnami is also spoken by many immigrants in the Netherlands. Outside Suriname, other variants of Caribbean Hindustani are also spoken by Indo-Caribbean people in other Caribbean countries. Compared to other varieties of Caribbean Hindustani, Sarnami is still widely spoken, especially in Suriname and the Netherlands.

Hindustani (Standard Hindi-Standard Urdu) which has also influenced the language is separately considered a prestige language within Suriname, Sarnami is generally seen as a vernacular, and sometimes also considered to be a heritage language.

The difference with Standard Hindustani is mainly in the grammar. Sarnami, does not have the two cases of Hindi. Sarnami is also for example grammatically closer, to Bengali than it is to Hindi. An influence from Dutch on Sarnami grammar is, that the stem of the verb and the imperative mood are the same, meaning the syntax of the two languages is almost the same.

== Literature ==
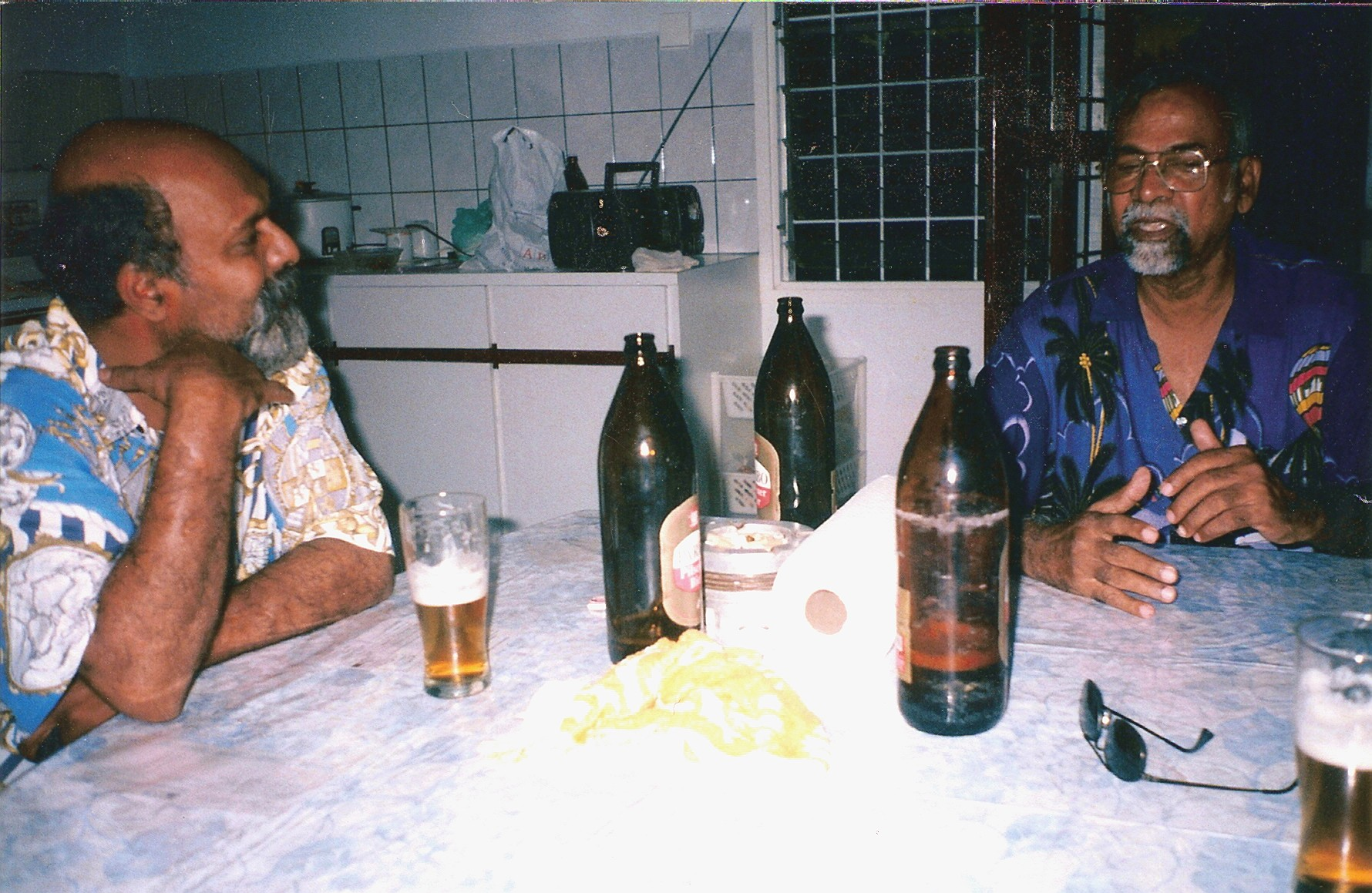
Two important Sarnami poets: Jit Narain and Shrinivási

The first major Indo-Surinamese intellectual was Munshi Rahman Khan, with other major ones including Jit Narain, Rabin Baldewsingh, Chitra Gajadin, Cándani, Bhai, Raj Mohan and more.

== Music ==
Baithak Gana is the primary form of music where Sarnami is used. It is also used for other forms of music including folk music, classical music, bhajans and qawwali's.

== See also ==
- Indo-Surinamese people
- Caribbean Hindustani
- Fiji Hindi
- Mauritian Bhojpuri
