= Willy Alberga =

Willy Alberga (born 1947) is a Surinamese journalist and writer. She is known as the longtime host of the Radio Apintie program "Niet zomaar een gesprek."

== Biography ==
Willy Alberga was born in Paramaribo, Suriname, in 1947. She is the daughter of the writer Tonko Tonckens, whose book De vicieuze cirkel is set on the Paramaribo coast. When Alberga was young, her parents emigrated to the Netherlands. There, in Groningen, she studied to be a social worker. In 1973, she returned to Suriname with her family.

In the 1980s, Alberga established herself as a playwright, directing some of her own works. She later shifted to writing short stories. In 2004, she won second prize in the Kwakoe literary competition. She wrote her first story for children, "Maria gaat op stap," in 2005; it was published in the anthology Groeten uit Paramaribo. Alberga has written on themes of immigration between Suriname and the Netherlands.

In 1992, she was hired to work for Radio Apintie, where she hosted a program called "Niet zomaar een gesprek" ("Not Just Any Conversation"). On her show, she discussed culture and literature, and interviewed various personalities, over the course of more than 500 broadcasts. As a reporter, she also regularly contributed to the station's news coverage. In 2015, she was chosen alongside Marten Schalkwijk to host the current affairs program "Opiniemakers" on Apintie Television.

A founding member of Democratic Alternative '91, Alberga is politically active on various issues. Since the late 1980s, she has been heavily involved in AIDS education and commemoration efforts in Suriname. She has faced opposition and threats for her journalism and activism.
