= Anton de Kom =

Surinamese resistance fighter and author (1898–1945)

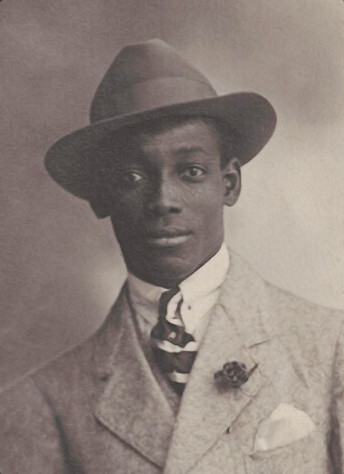
- Born: Cornelis Gerhard Anton de Kom; 22 February 1898; Paramaribo, Surinam
- Died: 24 April 1945 (aged 47); Stalag X-B, Sandbostel, Germany
- Occupations: Resistance fighter, author
- Children: Judith de Kom

Cornelis Gerhard Anton de Kom (22 February 1898 – 24 April 1945) (Note: 24 April 1945 is the most common date of death. Some sources use 29 April 1945. The Honorary List of Fallen which was compiled between 1945 and 1960, and which is on permanent display at the House of Representatives lists his date of death as March or April 1945.) was a Surinamese resistance fighter and anti-colonialist author. He was arrested in Suriname and the protest against his arrest resulted in two deaths. De Kom was subsequently exiled to the Netherlands where he wrote Wij slaven van Suriname ("We Slaves of Surinam"), an anti-colonial book.

During World War II, he joined the resistance, was arrested, and sent to concentration camps where he died. In 2020, de Kom was added as a subject on the Canon of the Netherlands, a chronological list of fifty key events and people in Dutch history to be taught in schools.

== Biography ==
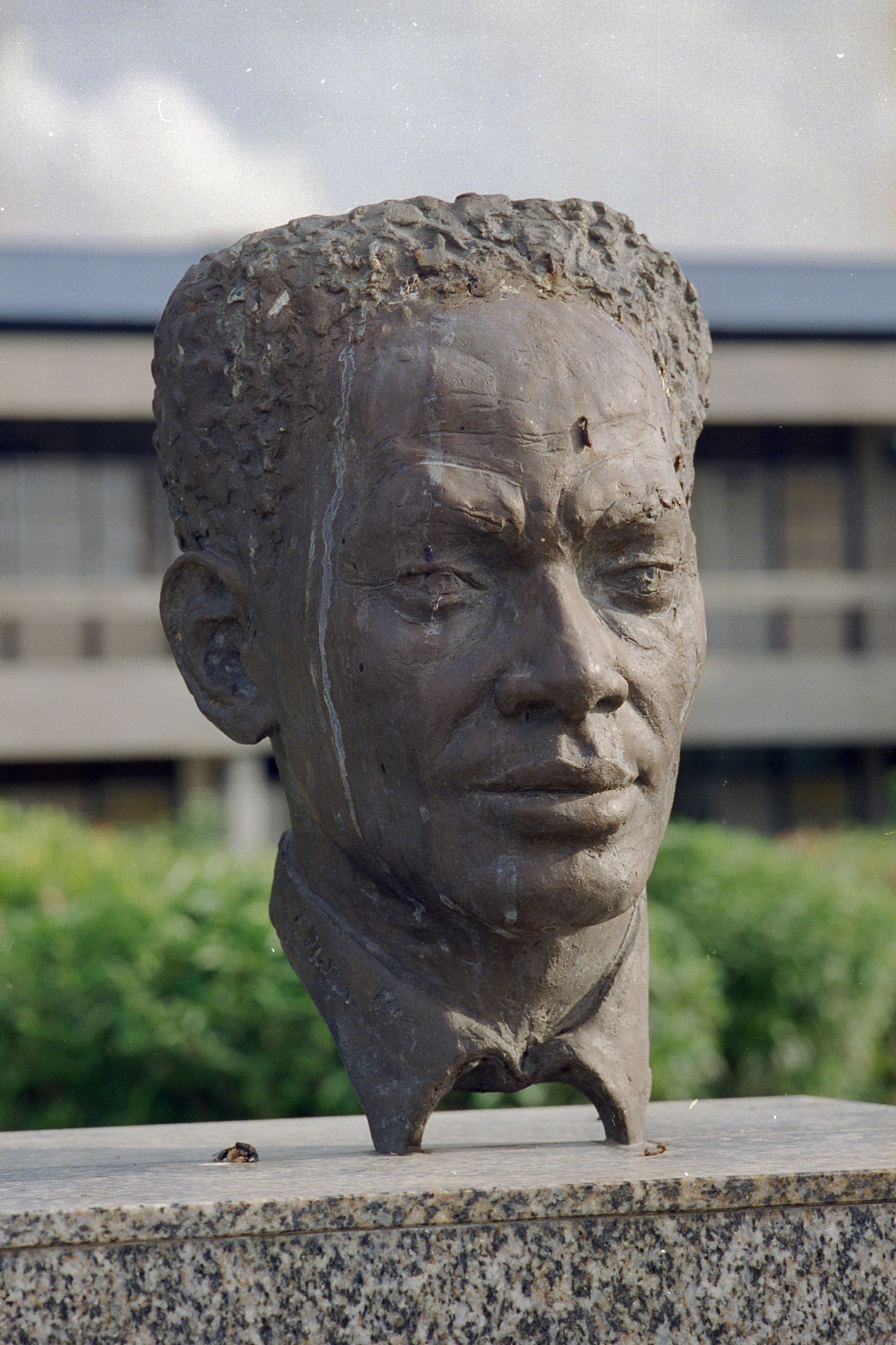
Statue of Anton de Kom in Paramaribo

De Kom was born in Paramaribo, Suriname, to farmer Adolf de Kom and Judith Jacoba Dulder. His father was born a slave.

De Kom finished primary and secondary school and obtained a diploma in bookkeeping. He worked for the Balata Compagnieën Suriname en Guyana. On 29 July 1920, he resigned and left for Haiti where he worked for the Societé Commerciale Hollandaise Transatlantique. In 1921, he left for the Netherlands. He volunteered for the Huzaren (a Dutch cavalry regiment) for a year. In 1922, he started working for a consultancy in The Hague. One year later he was laid off due to a reorganization. He then became a sales representative selling coffee, tea and tobacco for a company in The Hague, where he met his future wife, Nel.

In addition to his work, he was active in numerous left-wing organizations, including nationalist Indonesian student organisations and Links Richten (Aim Left), and wrote for communist magazines like De Tribune, often using the pseudonyms Adek or Adekom. In 1929, de Kom was a speaker at the 18th Party Congress of the Communist Party Holland (CPH) where he emphasised that the people of Suriname live in poverty without rights, and to his delight a resolution passed to change the slogan to "Indonesia, Suriname and Curaçao, immediate and full independence from the Netherlands".

De Kom and his family left for Suriname on 20 December 1932 and arrived on 4 January 1933. From that moment on he was closely watched by the colonial authorities. He started a consultancy in his parents' house. Large groups used to gather around the house, because de Kom was helping Javanese and Indo-Surinamese with their re-emigration. Weapons were offered to de Kom for protection, but he refused to take up arms, because he did not want a bloodbath. On 1 February, he was arrested while en route to the office of governor Bram Rutgers with a large group of followers. On both 3 and 4 February, his followers gathered in front of the Attorney General's office to demand De Kom's release. On 7 February, a large crowd gathered on the Oranjeplein (currently called the Onafhankelijkheidsplein). Rumor had it that De Kom was about to be released. When the crowd refused to leave the square, police opened fire, killing two people and wounding 22.

=== Exile in the Netherlands ===
On 10 May 1933, de Kom was sent to the Netherlands without trial and exiled from his native country. His arrival had been announced by De Tribune who expected to greet him with 25,000 revolutionaries. Over 2,000 people showed up, de Kom gave a short speech, and continued his journey to The Hague.

De Kom was inspired by Albert Helman's Zuid-Zuid-West (1926) which ended with a fierce anti-colonial epilogue. During his time in the Netherlands, he was often unemployed, and decided to write his own book about the history of Suriname and slavery called, Wij slaven van Suriname (We Slaves of Suriname) which was published in a censored form in 1934. (Note: Chapter 7 which dealt with the Dutch proletariat has missing pages. The uncensored version was published by Contact Publishers.) Contact Publishers was pressured not to release the book, and the Centrale Inlichtingendienst (secret service) demanded and was given a preliminary copy in violation of the freedom of press.

De Kom participated in demonstrations for the unemployed, travelled abroad with a group as a tap dancer, and was drafted for werkverschaffing (unemployment relief work), a program similar to the American WPA, in 1939. He gave lectures for leftist groups, mainly communists, about colonialism and racial discrimination.

=== World War II ===
After the German invasion in 1940, his writings were banned. (Note: Wij Slaven van Suriname had been translated into German as Wir Sklaven von Surinam in 1935, and was listed as damaging and unwanted on 31 December 1938) De Kom joined the Dutch resistance, especially the CPH cell in The Hague. He wrote articles for the underground paper De Vonk of the CPH, mainly about the terror of fascist groups in the streets of The Hague (much of their terror was directed against Jews).

On 7 August 1944, de Kom was arrested. He was imprisoned at the Oranjehotel in Scheveningen, and transferred to Camp Vught, a Dutch concentration camp. In early September 1944, he was sent to Oranienburg-Sachsenhausen, where he was forced to work for the Heinkel aircraft factory. De Kom died on 24 April 1945 of tuberculosis in Camp Sandbostel near Bremervörde (between Bremen and Hamburg), which was a satellite camp of the Neuengamme concentration camp, five days before the camp was liberated. He was buried in a mass grave. In 1960, his remains were found and brought to the Netherlands. There he was buried at the National Cemetery of Honours in Loenen. In 1982, he was posthumously awarded the Resistance Memorial Cross.

== Family ==
De Kom was married to a Dutch woman, Petronella Borsboom. They had four children, including novelist and activist Judith de Kom, who campaigned for the public recognition of her father's role as an activist and Dutch resistance fighter throughout her life. Another son, Cees de Kom, lives in Suriname. His grandson Antoine de Kom is a Dutch writer and poet.

== Aftermath ==
Part of his unpublished novel Ons bloed is rood (Our blood is red) appeared in Adek (1983). In 1988, the Surinamese Worker and Unemployed Organisation (SAWO) submitted a motion with the municipality of Amsterdam to name a square after Anton de Kom. A square in Amsterdam-Zuidoost near the shopping centre was renamed Anton de Komplein. The square features a sculpture of Anton de Kom as a monument to his life and works, sculpted by Jikke van Loon. SAWO went on to petition the Government for rehabilitation.

In 2008, Vereniging Ons Suriname rediscovered manuscripts which were lost in the 1960s. The manuscripts contained the movie scenario Tjiboe, parts of the novels Ons bloed is rood and Om een hap rijst (For a bit of rice), and several Anansi-stories, a spider who represents skill and wisdom in folktales of the Akan people. The archives were presented to Michiel van Kempen by Anton de Kom's children Ad and Judith de Kom, and are on display at the Literature Museum.

In 1981, the Pontewerfstraat in Frimangron, Paramaribo was renamed to Anton de Komstraat. On 17 October 1983, the University of Suriname was renamed the Anton de Kom University of Suriname in honor of De Kom. In 2007, the LBR Lecture, an annual lecture against racism and discrimination organised by the Resistance Museum, was renamed Anton de Kom Lecture.

In 2020, de Kom was added as a subject on the Canon of the Netherlands. De Kom is the first Surinamese citizen to be added to the 50 vital subjects to be taught in school in the Netherlands. Ingrid van Engelshoven, Dutch Minister of Education, stressed that the shadow sides of society needed to be addressed as well. A film about Anton Kom is in the making as of 2020.

== Gallery ==
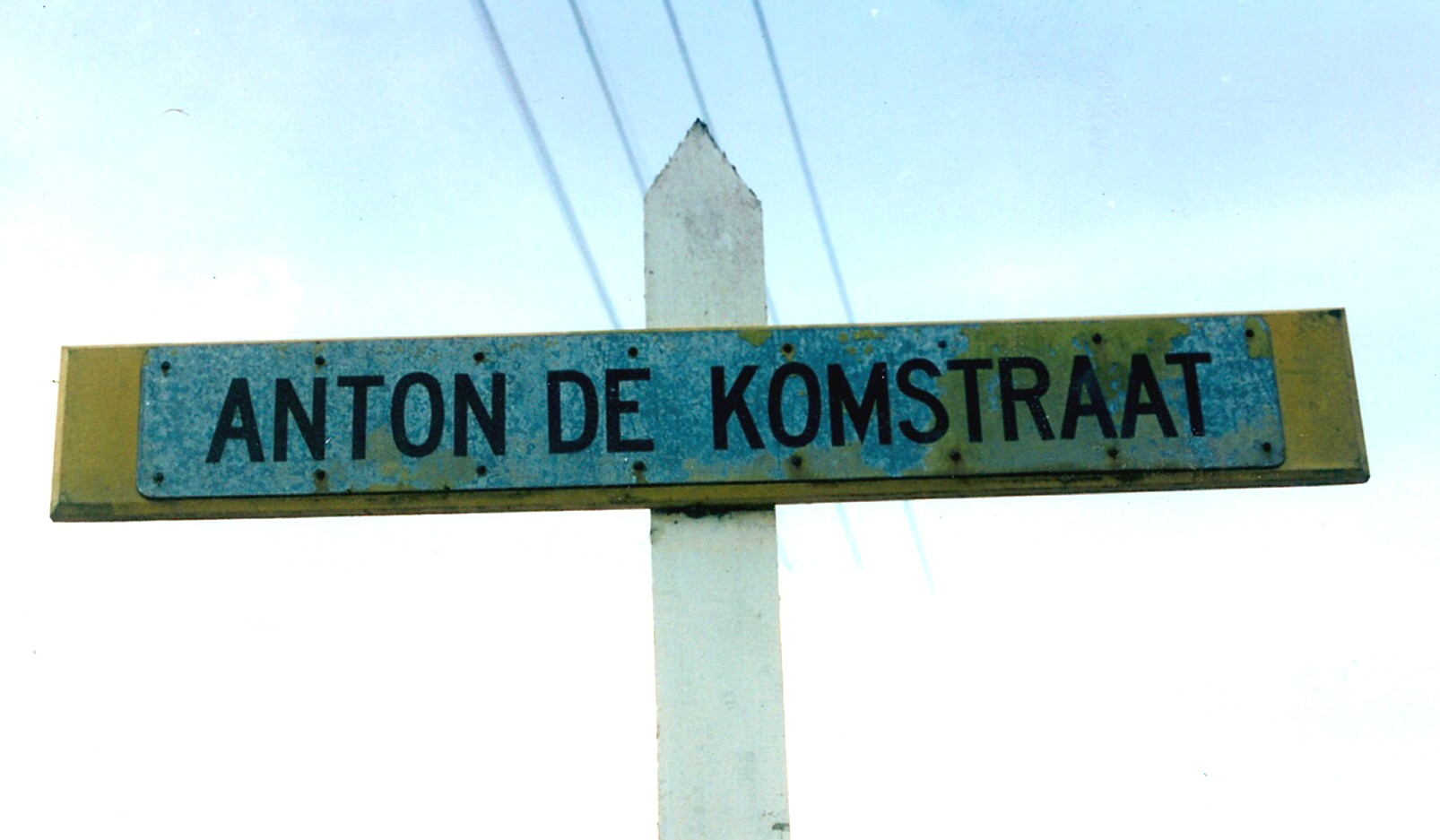
Anton de Kom Street in Paramaribo

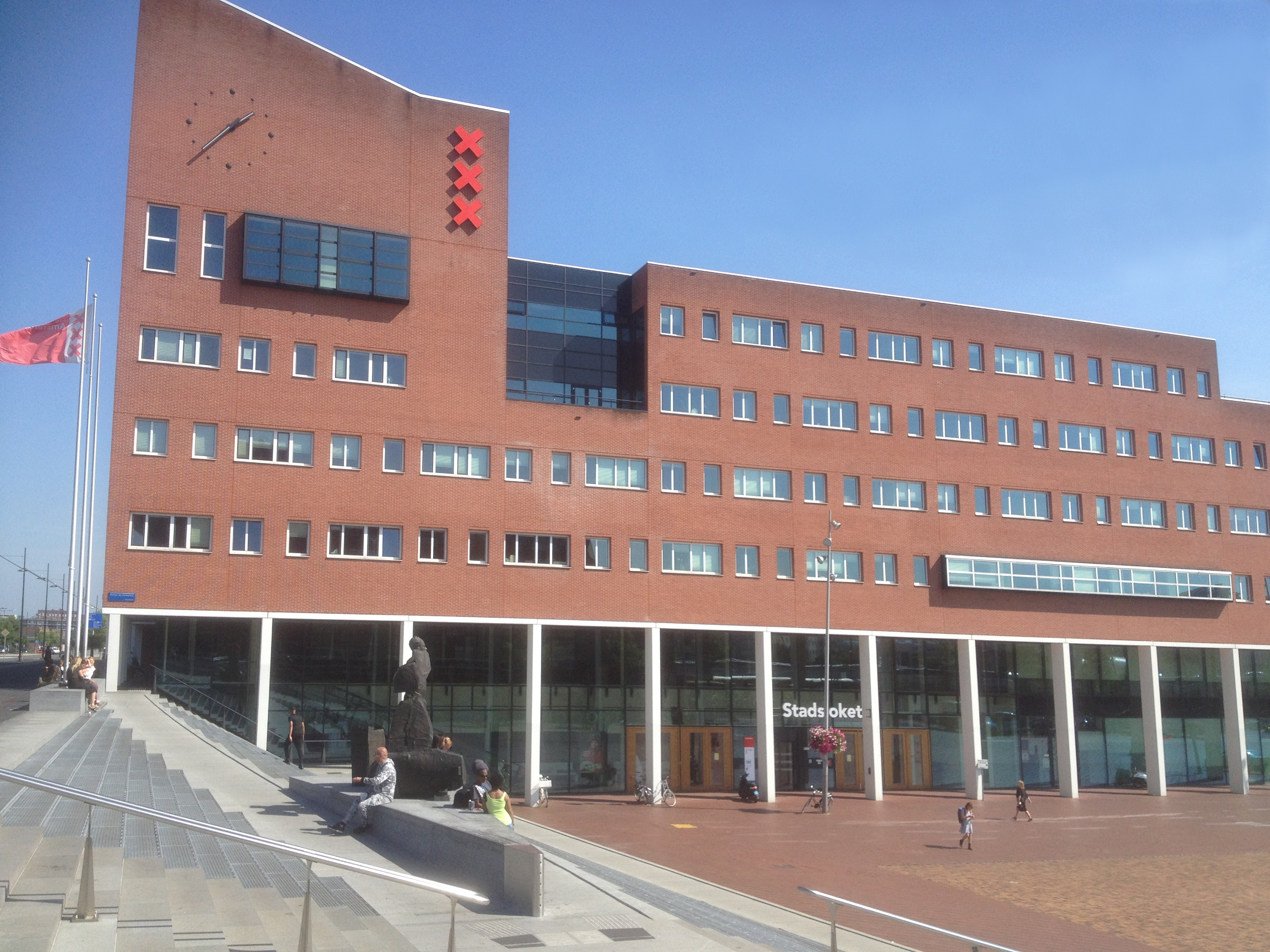
Anton de Kom civic building, Amsterdam

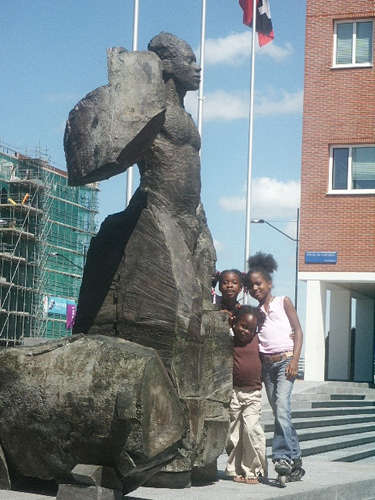
Monument to Anton de Kom, Amsterdam

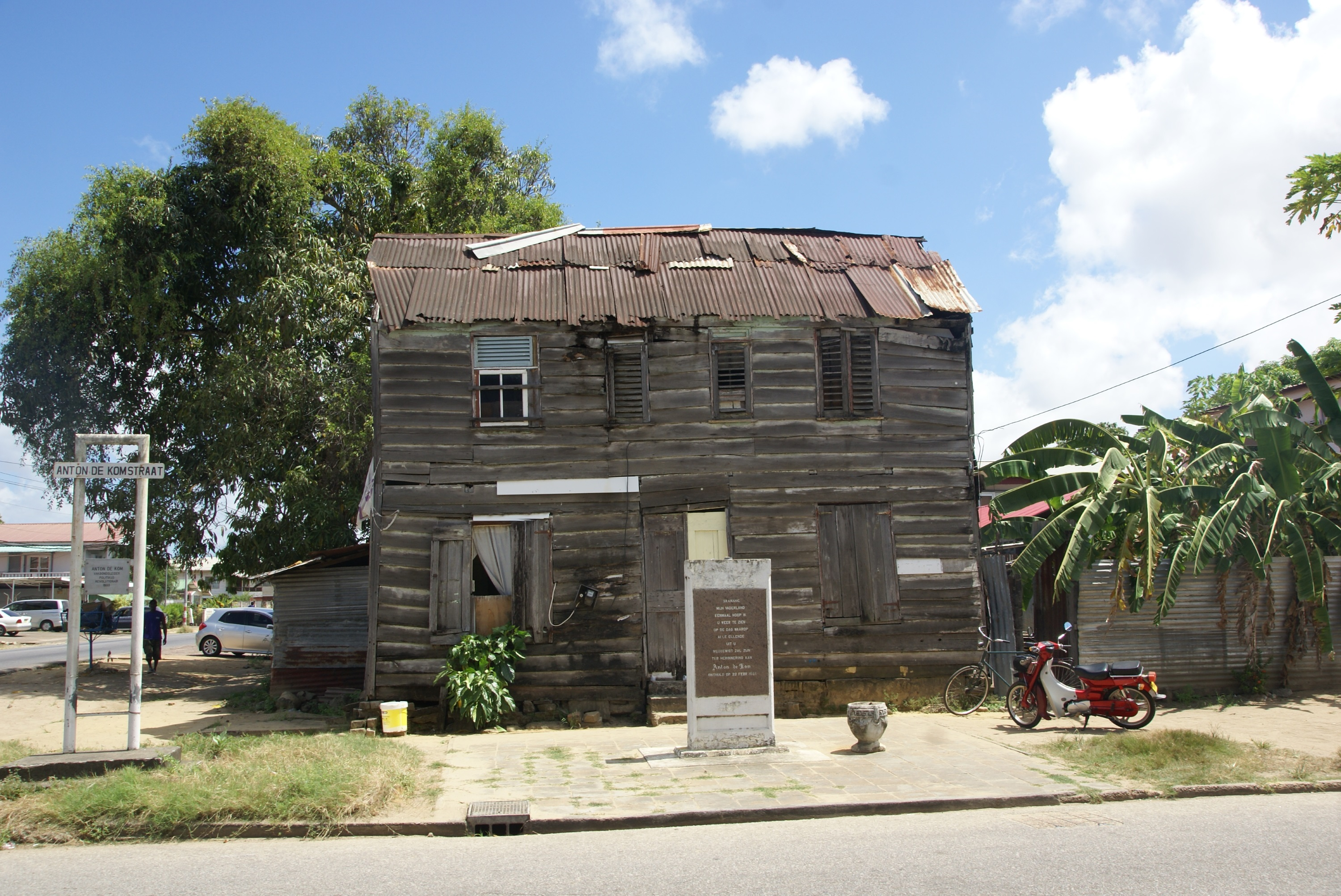
Birthplace of Anton de Kom in Paramaribo

== Written work ==
- Anton de Kom: Wij slaven van Suriname (1934 digital version; uncensored edition 1971). English translation: We Slaves of Surinam, 1987 (Publisher: Palgrave Macmillan)

== Films and documentaries ==
- A documentary film about him, Peace, Memories of Anton de Kom, by filmmaker Ida Does, was produced in 2012.
- In February 2018, a short film, Anton de Kom, In het harnas van koloniaal Nederland, directed and written by Ray Blinker and Greg Macousi, premiered in Amsterdam, Netherlands.
