= Ida Does =

Surinamese-born Dutch journalist and writer

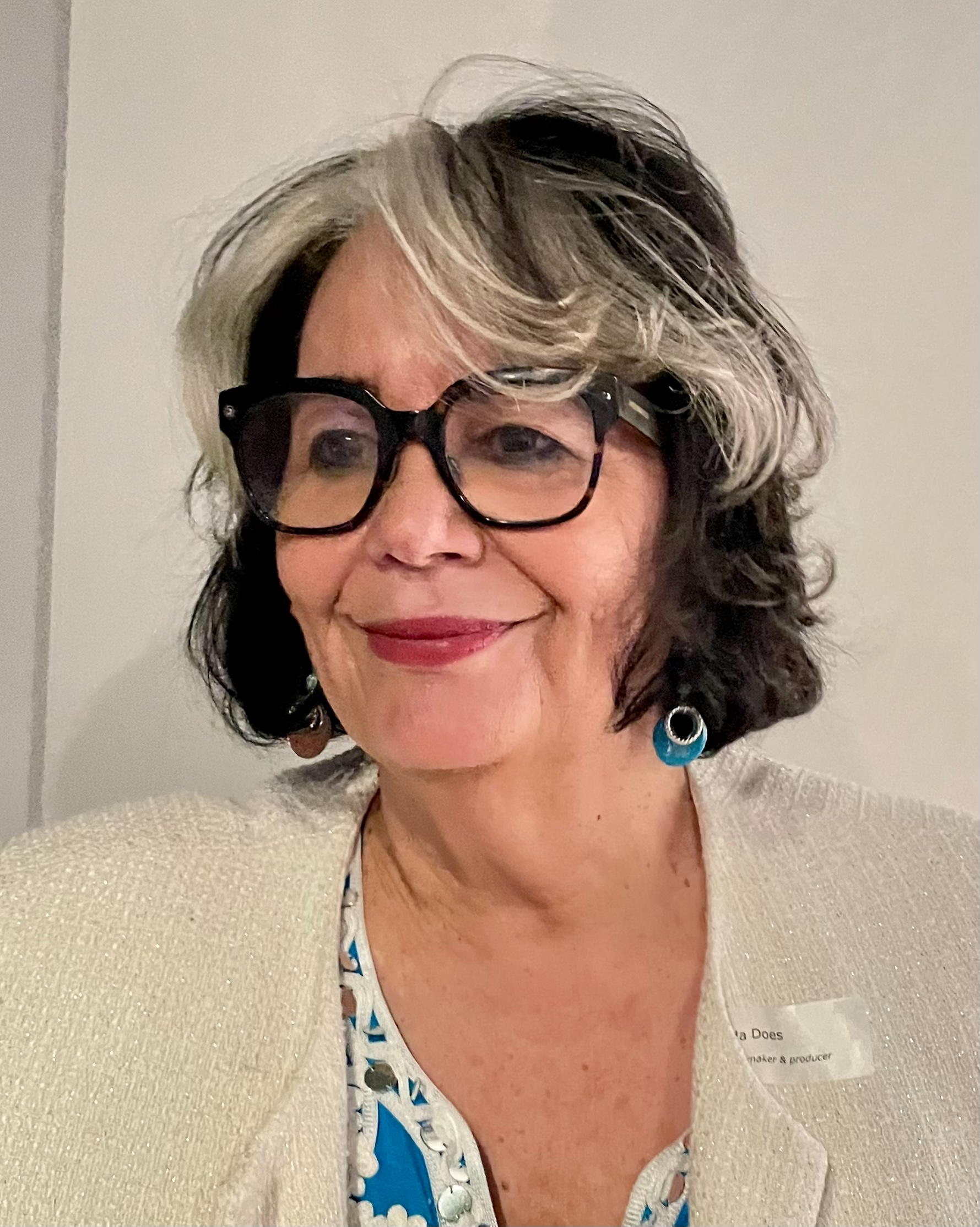
- Ida Does, 2023
- Born: Ida Chin-A-Loi; 1955 (age 70–71); Paramaribo, Suriname, Kingdom of the Netherlands
- Other names: Ida Does-Chin A Loi
- Occupations: teacher, journalist, writer, filmmaker

Ida Does, née Chin-A-Loi (born 1955), is a Surinamese-born Dutch journalist, writer, and documentary filmmaker. After working at Omroep West (TV West) as a reporter, editor-in-chief, and program director, she began making independent films, mainly focused on art, culture, colonialism, and social justice. Her documentaries have won awards in Canada, the Netherlands, and Trinidad and Tobago.

== Early life and education ==
Ida Chin-A-Loi was born in 1955 in Paramaribo, the capital of the constituent country of the Kingdom of the Netherlands, Suriname. She left Suriname as a young child to attend school, studying at the Media Academy of Hilversum and the Maurits Binger Film Institute of Amsterdam. After completing her education, Chin-A-Loi returned to Suriname, but fled to Aruba in 1982 after the Moiwana massacre during the dictatorship of Dési Bouterse. She married Henri Does, a Surinamse publicist and intellectual.

== Career ==
Does began her career as a journalist, publishing Dutch-language articles in various media such as Algemeen Dagblad, Vrij Nederland, and other magazines and newspapers in Aruba, the Netherlands, and Suriname. In the late 1980s, she combined social work with media, producing an informational film about the cultural problems of immigrant girls attending the Anne Frank Secondary School in The Hague. In the 1990s, she served as editor-in-chief of the Surinamese cultural journal Mutyama and the Aruban edition of the newspaper, Amigoe. She has also written stories for Dutch radio station VPRO's program De Avonden and worked at the broadcast company Omroep West (TV West) as a reporter, editor-in-chief, and program director.

In 2007, Does began working as an independent filmmaker. Many of her works are inspired by her interest in history, particularly the pioneering figures of Caribbean colonial history, their legacy, and the issues that they dealt with, entwining art, culture, and social justice in her works. Her first documentary Trefossa: I Am Not I (Trefossa: Mi a no mi, 2008) about the poet Henri Frans de Ziel won honorable mention in the 2009 Trinidad & Tobago Film Festival. It also won the Public Award from the Africa in the Picture Film Festival in Amsterdam in 2010. Her documentary Peace, Memories of Anton de Kom about Anton de Kom, the World War II resistance fighter and anti-colonialist, won best short film in 2012 at the Trinidad & Tobago Film Festival. In 2017, Does was selected at the CaribbeanTales International Film Festival in Toronto as the "Best Woman of Color Creator" and honored with the CineFam Award, while her film, Amsterdam, Traces of Sugar received the Best Documentary Award.

== Works ==
- 2008 Trefossa: Mi a no mi (Trefossa: I Am Not I).
- 2010 Portraits of Four Woman Artists of Aruba.
- 2012 Laga Bai.
- 2012 Peace: Memories of Anton de Kom.
- 2013 Poetry Is an Island: Derek Walcott.
- 2014 Sporen van Smaragd, Indisch erfgoed in Den Haag (Traces of Emerald, Indonesian heritage in The Hague).
- 2017 Amsterdam, Traces of Sugar.
