= Ismene Krishnadath =

Surinamese writer (born 1956)

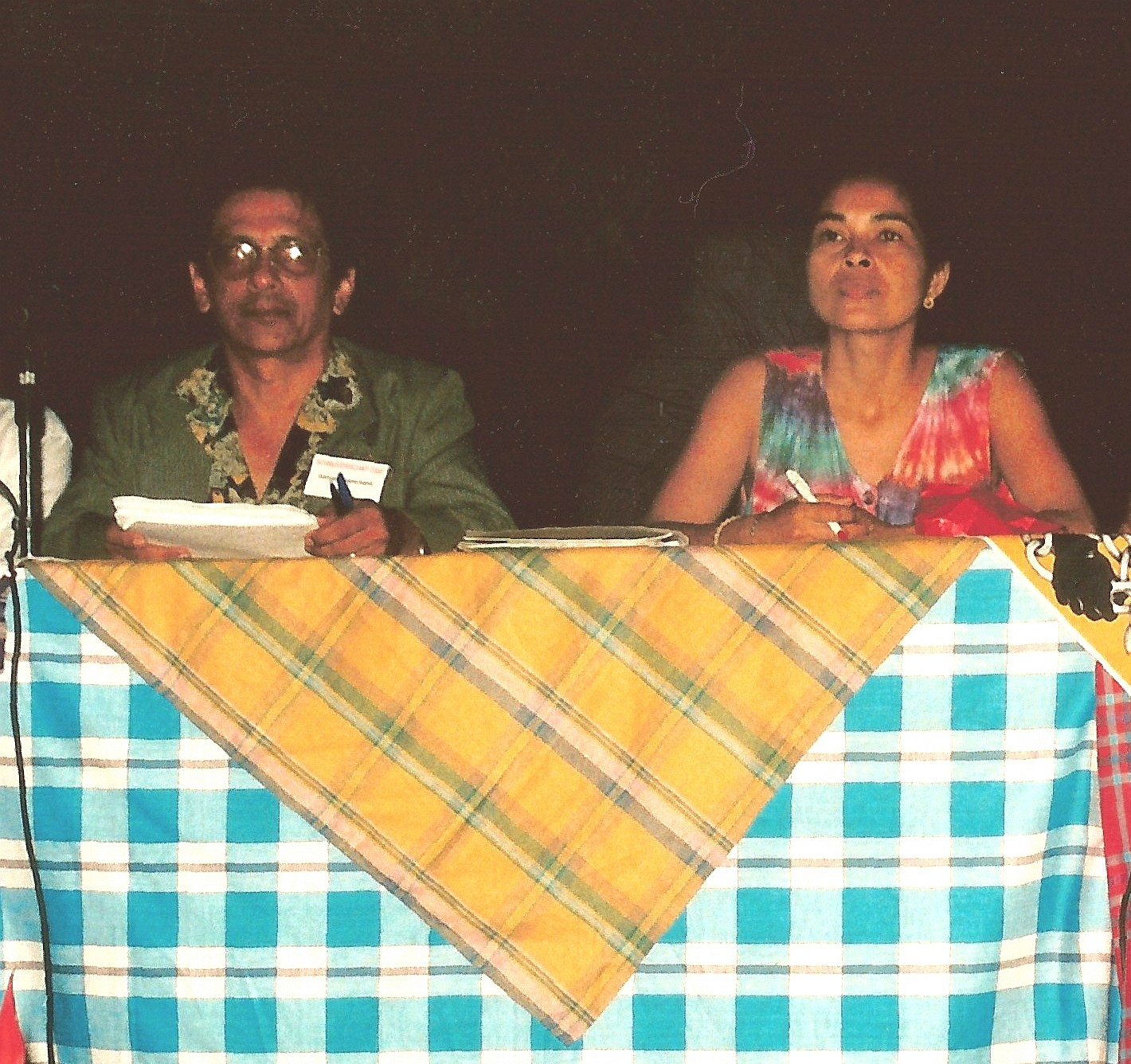
- Krishnadath (right) with Trinidadian critic Kenneth Ramchand at the Schrijverschap 2000 congress in Paramaribo, July 1997
- Born: 25 January 1956 (age 70); Paramaribo, Suriname
- Education: Utrecht University
- Occupations: Writer and publisher

Ismene Shakuntal Debi Krishnadath (born 25 January 1956) is a Surinamese writer.

== Biography ==
Krishnadath was born in Paramaribo, Suriname, and, as a child, lived both there and in Utrecht, Netherlands. She studied education at Utrecht University. In 1975, when Suriname became independent, Krishnadath became the first person to apply for citizenship, and received one of the first passports; in 1979, she returned to live in Suriname. For ten years she worked as a pedagogy teacher at various teacher training courses and, from 1990, as an education consultant. She was part of the progressive education movement Kenki Skoro and wrote a teaching manual with Dayenne Angel.

In 1989, Krishnadath started a publishing house and agency, Publishing Services Suriname, and a publisher for books for small children: Lees mee (Read Along). She became a prolific author of children's and youth books, many of which were illustrated by Gerold Slijngard. Krishnadath also writes for adults.

She received the inaugural State Prize for Children's Literature in 1993. In 2011 she was awarded the Henri Frans de Ziel Culture Prize for her commitment to literary life in Suriname.

For ten years, she chaired the Surinamese writers group Schrijversgroep '77.

== Works ==
=== For children ===
- De flaporen van Amar (1989)
- Nieuwe streken van koniman Anansi (1989)
- Lees mee (1989-91; in 4 parts)
- Bruine bonen met zoutvlees (1992)
- Het zoo-syndroom: een Anansiverhaal (1992)
- De vangst van Pake Djasidin (1992)
- Veren voor de piai (1992)
- Reken mee (1993)
- Seriba in de schelp (1996)
- De groene fles (1997)
- B'Anansi keert terug naar de eenentachtigste afslag (1997)
- De opdracht van Fodewroko (2001)
- De legende van Çakuntela van het Groene Continent (2004)
- Kook mee (2006; cookbook)

=== For adults ===
- Didaktische werkvormen voor het voortgezet onderwijs (1987; with D. Angel & M. v. Leeuwaarde)
- Paulo Freire; een bijdrage voor de Surinaamse onderwijsleerkrachten (1988; with D. Angel)
- Lijnen van liefde (1990; novel)
- Handleiding voor het onderwijzen (1990; with D. Angel)
- Vrouwenbundel (1993; anthology, editor)
- Satyem (1995, novel)
- Indo-ethnic roots and... [more]: Reflections on the non-ethnic orientation of Surinamese writers and their contribution in defining the concept of Caribbean identity (2008, essay)

She also contributed to the English anthology of Surinamese literature Diversity is Power (2007).

== See also ==
- Surinamese literature
- Caribbean literature
