= Cándani =

Surinamese writer (1965–2021)

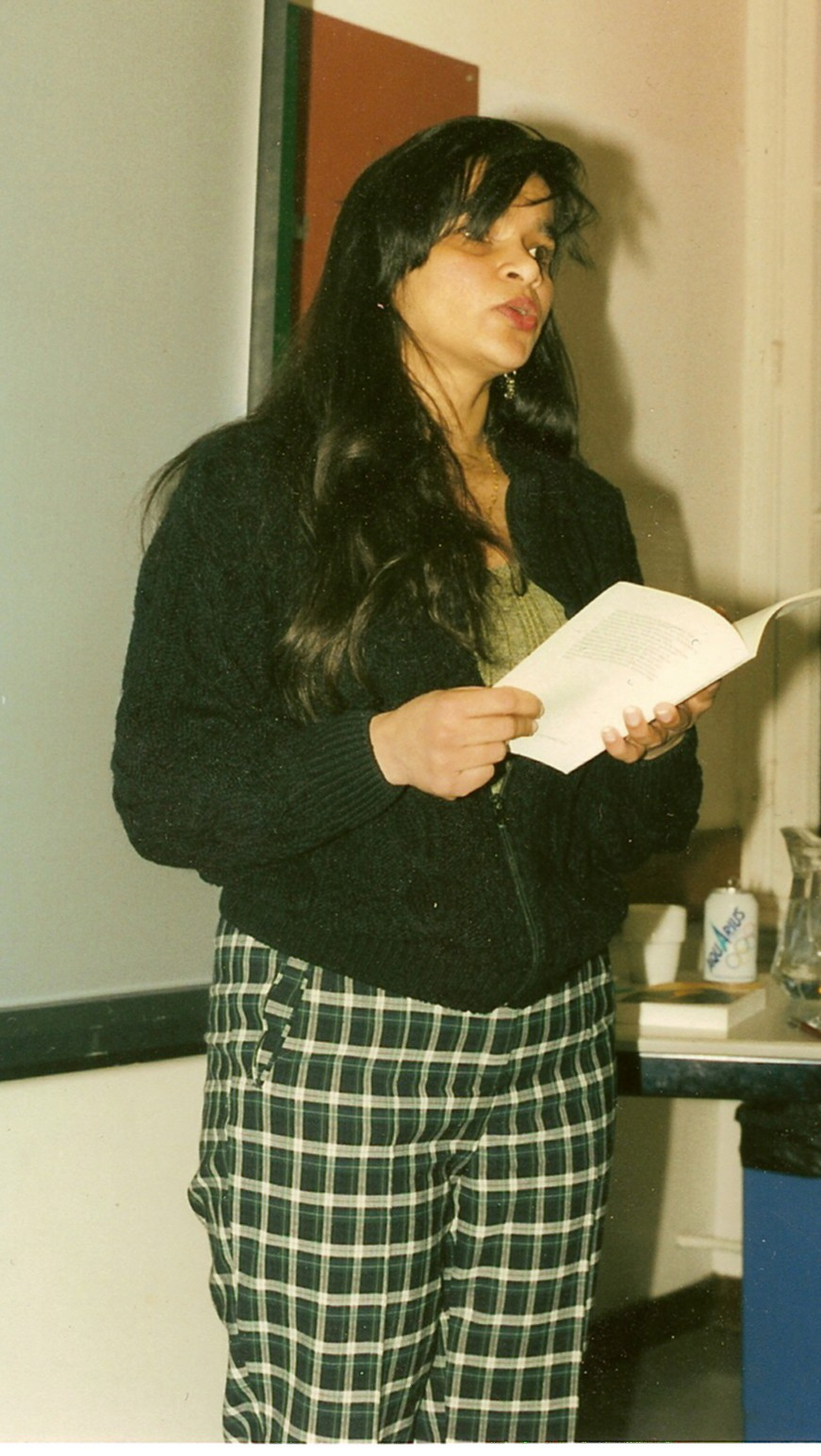
- Cándani in 1992
- Born: Asha Radjkoemar; 8 March 1965; District Suriname, Suriname
- Died: 4 August 2021 (aged 56); Amsterdam, Kingdom of the Netherlands
- Occupations: poet; writer; painter
- Spouse: Dennis van den Bosch (m. 1999)
- Writing career
- Pen name: Saya Yasmine Amores
- Literary movement: Surinamese literature

Saya Yasmine Amores (born Asha Radjkoemar; 8 March 1965 – 4 August 2021) was a Surinamese-Dutch poet, writer, and painter. She wrote under the pen name Cándani from 1982 to 2007. She then used the name Saya Yasmine Amores, which she legally adopted in 2013.

== Early life ==
Asha Radjkoemar was born in the district of Suriname, located in the country of Suriname, on 8 March 1965. In 1982, she took up the pen name "Cándani", meaning "Moonlight" in the Sarnami language.

== Literary career ==
Cándani's first book was published in 1990. It was a poetry collection in Sarnami with Dutch translations entitled Ghunghru tut gail/De rinkelband is gebroken [The bangle is broken].

Cándani's next collections were in Dutch, including Vanwaar je dacht te vertrekken sta je geplant (1993) and Een zoetwaterlied (2000). She returned to Sarnami/Dutch bilingual poetry with Ghar ghar ke khel/Het spel van huisje huisje (2002). These collections are centered around memories of Indo-Surinamese rural life.

She also wrote two novels, Oude onbekenden (2001) and Huis van as (2002), in which the search for the Indo-Surinamese identity is placed within the historical context of Hindustani migration to Suriname and re-migration to the Netherlands.

Geef mij het land dat in jou woont (2004) is a collection of poems about the history of Suriname.

== Personal life and death ==
Cándani married Dennis van den Bosch in 1999, publishing a commemorative collection Zal ik terugkeren als je bruid [I will come as your bride]. She had one daughter from a prior relationship in Suriname.

She was hospitalised in 2020 at the Antoni van Leeuwenhoekziekenhuis. She died of cancer on 4 August 2021 in Amsterdam.
