= De Ware Tijd =

de Ware Tijd
- Type: Daily newspaper
- Format: broadsheet
- Owner(s): DWT Publishing NV
- Editor: Iwan Brave
- Founded: 2 September 1957
- Headquarters: Paramaribo, Suriname
- Website: www.dwtonline.com

De Ware Tijd (English: The True Time) is one of four daily newspapers in Paramaribo, Suriname. As of 2002, it was the largest-circulation paper in the country, ahead of its rival, De West, and was described as taking a "staunchly independent stance" politically. It is published in the Dutch language, and privately owned. The Kondreman cartoon is published by the newspaper since 2005. 'Taxi' was published earlier. The newspaper publishes also an online edition.

De Ware Tijd is known for its literary section called De Ware Tijd Literair which was started in 1986 by Michiel van Kempen, and from 1992 to 2016 edited by Els Moor.
