= Surinamese literature =

Surinamese literature refers to the literature which is considered to belong to both the oral traditions as well as Surinamese written literature or people born or strongly-affiliated with Suriname. Much modern literature is written in the Dutch language although other languages of Suriname are also used. The oral literature is still a vital and authentic expression in Surinamese culture. In turn, the influence of the oral culture on the written literature of Suriname is impossible to imagine. At the end of the 18th century, the indigenous Surinamese began to write literature. Surinamese Creole literature in particular is "not widely known, nor easily accessible."

== See also ==
- List of Surinamese writers
