= Martin Luther Church (Paramaribo) =

Church building in Paramaribo, Suriname

- Maarten Luther Kerk
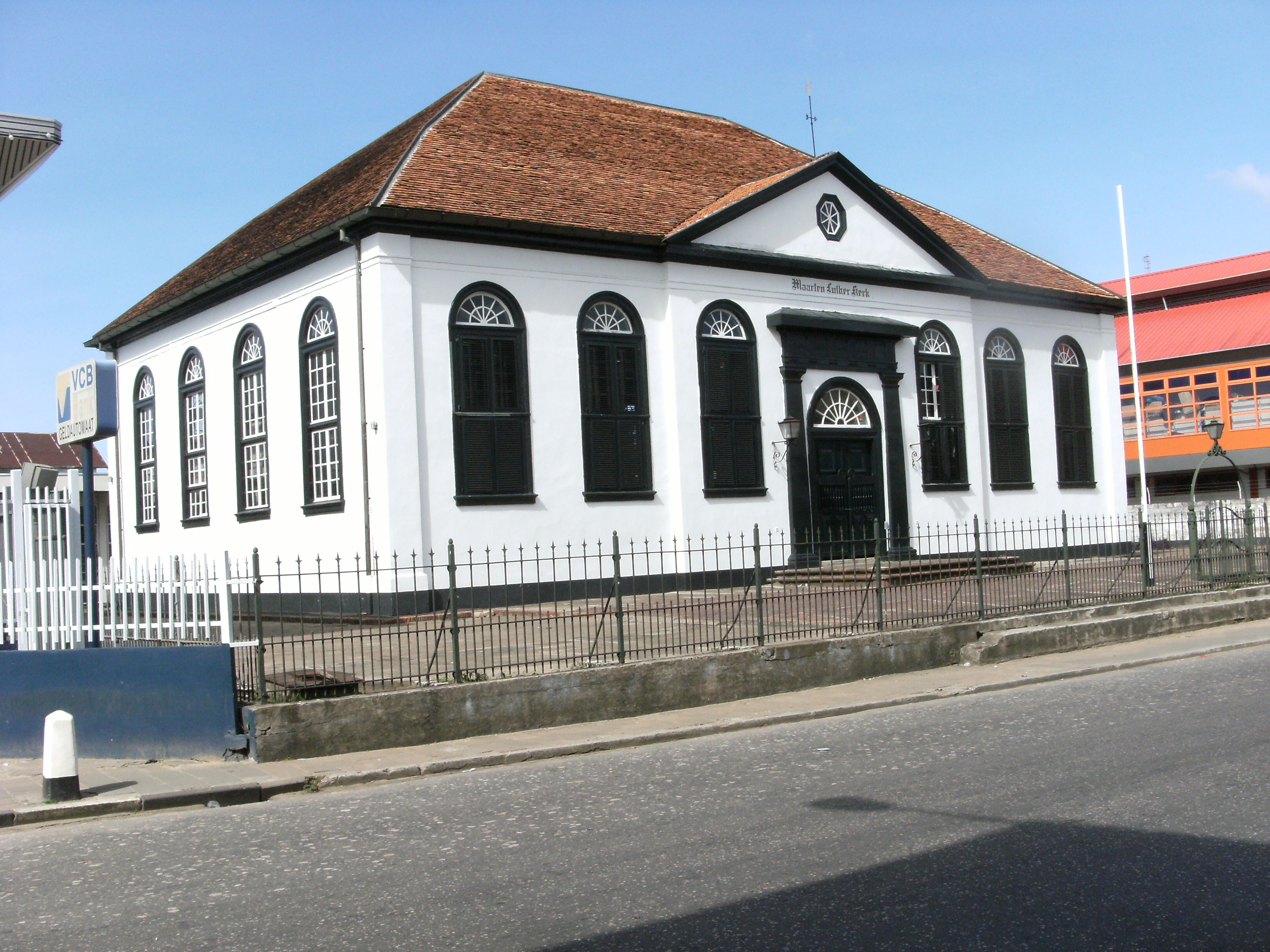

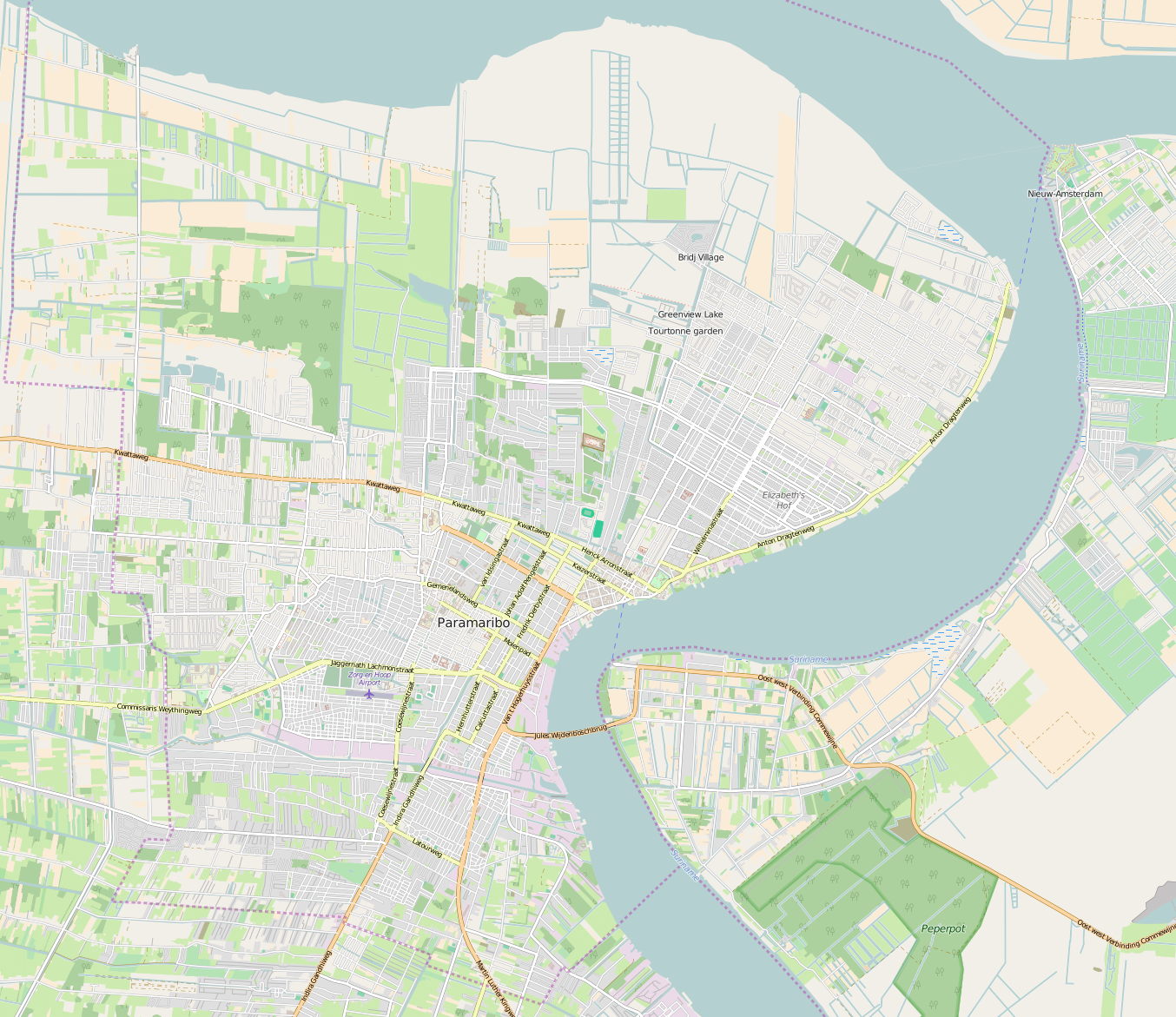
- Location within Paramaribo

Religion
- Affiliation: Evangelical Lutheran Church in Suriname
- Year consecrated: 6 July 1834

Location
- Location: Waterkant, Paramaribo, Suriname
- Interactive map of Martin Luther Church
- Coordinates: 5.823694°N 55.159528°W

Architecture
- Architect: C.A. Roman
- Materials: plastered brick

The Martin Luther Church (Dutch: Maarten Luther Kerk or Lutherse Kerk) is a church of the Evangelical Lutheran Church in Suriname. It is located on Waterkant in the historic centre of Paramaribo, Suriname. The building is a monument. The first church burnt down in 1832. The current church dates from 1834.

== History ==
The Lutheran congregation of Paramaribo had been sharing the Centrumkerk with the Dutch Reformed Church of Suriname. On 15 November 1741, the Society of Suriname allowed the congregation to build their own church providing it was out of sight of the Dutch Reformed Church. In 1742, Johannes Pfaff arrived as the first pastor. On 2 September 1744, the first stone was laid, and the church was consecrated in 1747.

The first church was destroyed in the fire of 1832. A new church was built at the same location in neoclassical style by C.A. Roman. The church was consecrated on 6 July 1834.

In 1940, little houses were built near the church for elderly single women. In 1975, an old age home was constructed on the terrain. In 1975, the church was officially named Maarten Luther Kerk.

== Building ==
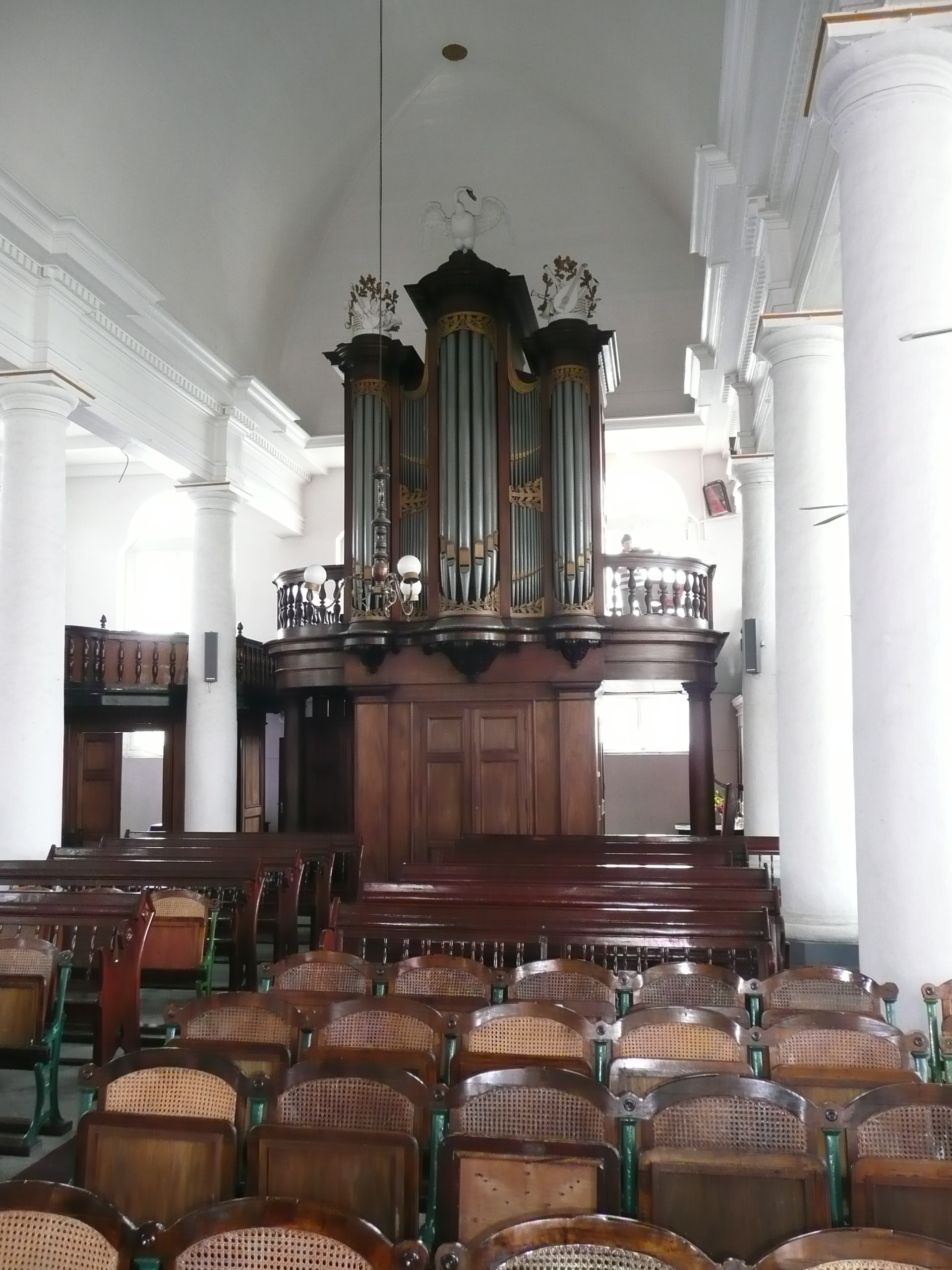
Interior of the church

The church has been built using plastered brick. The mansard roof is laid with slate tiles. The interior is supported by six Doric columns. The white interior is contrasted by the dark pulpit and organ.

The organ of the church was built by Jonathan Bätz and delivered in January 1833 after the first church had burnt down. It was returned to the Netherlands, and finally installed on 3 May 1835. In 2016, it was restored. Johannes Helstone was one of the organists of the church.

On 2 June 1892, a memorial stone for G.C. Steijnis was placed behind the pulpit. Steijnis was the pastor of the church who publicly criticised governor de Savornin Lohman.
