= God zij met ons Suriname =

National anthem of Suriname

English: God be with our Suriname
- National anthem of Suriname
- Also known as: Opo kondreman (English: Rise, countrymen)
- Lyrics: Cornelis Atses Hoekstra (1893) and Henry de Ziel (1959)
- Music: Johannes Corstianus de Puy, 1876
- Adopted: 1959

Audio sample
- U.S. Navy Band instrumental version (one verse): file; help

"God zij met ons Suriname" (Dutch pronunciation: [ˌɣɔt ˈsɛi mɛt ɔns syːriˈnaːmə]; "God be with our Suriname"), or "Opo kondreman" ("Rise, countrymen" in Sranan Tongo), is the national anthem of Suriname. It has two verses: the first in Dutch and the second in Sranan Tongo.

== History ==
The original version of the anthem was written by Cornelis Atses Hoekstra in 1893 and based on a 1876 melody by Johannes Corstianus de Puy. It was written to replace the old anthem "Wilhelmus". The anthem did not have an official status. In 1959, the Government of Suriname appointed Surinamese writer Henri Frans de Ziel to add a stanza about the unity of the country to Hoekstra's anthem. De Ziel was concerned about the negative nuance in the original and started to transform the anthem into a positive message. He combined this with a poem he wrote in Sranan Tongo on the death of Ronald Elwin Kappel. His anthem was unanimously approved by the Government of Suriname on 7 December 1959. De Ziel originally used a melody by Surinamese composer Johannes Helstone, however the government preferred the original 1876 melody.

== Lyrics ==
Dutch verse	IPA transcription (Note: See Help:IPA/Dutch, Dutch phonology and Surinamese Dutch.)	English translation	
God zij met ons Suriname; Hij verheff'ons heerlijk land Hoe wij hier ook samen kwamen Aan zijn grond zijn wij verpand Werkend houden w'in gedachten Recht en waarheid maken vrij Al wat goed is te betrachten Dat geeft aan ons land waardij.	[ɣɔt‿sɛi mɛt ɔns ˌsy.ri.ˈnaː.mə] [ɦɛi̯ vər.ɦɛf ɔns ˈɦeːr.lək lɑnt] [ɦu ʋɛi̯ ɦir oːk ˈsaː.mən ˈkʋaː.mən] [aːn zɛi̯n ˈɣrɔnt zɛi̯n ʋɛi̯ vər.ˈpɑnt] [ˈʋɛr.kənt ˈɦɑu̯.dən ʋɪn ɣə.ˈdɑx.tən] [rɛxt ɛn ˈʋaːr.ɦɛi̯t ˈmaː.kən vrɛi̯] [ɑl ʋɑt‿xut ɪs tə bə.ˈtrɑx.tən] [dɑt‿xeːft aːn ɔns lɑnt ˈʋaːr.dɛi̯]	God be with our Suriname; May He elevate our lovely land No matter how we came here together We are dedicated to its soil Working we keep in mind Justice and truth will set free All that is good to devote oneself to Will give value to our land	
Sranan Tongo verse	IPA transcription (Note: See Help:IPA and Sranan Tongo phonology and orthography.)	English translation	Dutch translation
Opo, kondreman un' opo! Sranangron e kari un'. Wans' ope tata komopo Wi mu' seti kondre bun. Strey de f' strey, wi no sa frede. Gado de wi fesiman. Eri libi te na dede Wi sa feti gi Sranan.	[o.po koŋ.dɾe.maŋ uŋ o.po] [sɾa.naŋ.ɾoŋ e ka.ɾi uŋ] [waŋs o.pe ta.ta ko.mo.po] [wi mu se.ti koŋ.dɾe buŋ] [stɾei̯ de f‿strei̯ wi no sa fɾe.de] [ga.do de wi fe.si.maŋ] [e.ɾi li.bi te na de.de] [wi sa fe.ti gi sɾa.naŋ]	Rise countrymen, rise! The soil of Suriname is calling you. Wherever our ancestors came from We should take care of our country. There is a fight to fight, we shall not be afraid. God is our leader. Our whole life until death, We shall fight for Suriname.	Sta op, landgenoten, sta op! De Surinaamse grond roept je. Waar onze voorouders ook vandaan kwamen We moeten voor ons land zorgen. Er is een strijd om te strijden, we zullen niet bang zijn. God is onze leider. Ons hele leven tot aan de dood, We zullen vechten voor Suriname.
