= Berg en Dal =

Berg en Dal may refer to:

- Berg en Dal (municipality), a municipality in the province of Gelderland, the Netherlands
- Berg en Dal (village), a village in the municipality of Berg en Dal
- Berg en Dal (Suriname), a place in Suriname
- Berg en Dal (Baarn), a villa in Baarn
