= Bea Vianen =

Surinamese writer and poet (1935–2019)

- Born: Beatrice Sylvia Vianen; 6 November 1935; Paramaribo, Suriname
- Died: 6 January 2019 (aged 83); Paramaribo, Suriname
- Occupations: Writer, poet
- Notable work: Sarnami, Hai (1969); Strafhok (1971)

Beatrice Sylvia Vianen (6 November 1935 in Paramaribo – 6 January 2019) was a Surinamese writer and poet who went by the name Bea Vianen. Bea Vianen was the first Surinamese woman who had a book published by a Dutch publishing house (Querido).

== Biography ==
Bea Vianen was of both African and Indian ancestry. At the age of eight, her mother died of tuberculosis, and she was put in a Catholic foster home. Vianen went to the Netherlands in 1957 for her Bachelor of Education. Vianen wrote mainly in Dutch, but occasionally in Sranan Tongo, and her writing contained many autobiographical elements. Her first novel was Sarnami, Hai or "Surinam I am" in 1969, a coming of age story of a young East Indian girl in a country torn apart by religious and ethnic differences, and a colonial past. It's a bleak story set in a world without love, but also about a young woman who persists in life. It was translated into English and released in 2024 under the title 'My Name is Sita'

Vianen also wrote poetry, which has been collected in Liggend stilstaan bij blijvende monumenten (1975). In 1978, she started to work for Avenue for whom she travelled to places like Peru, Colombia and Ecuador. The journeys resulted in many poems, and many personal dramas.

Vianen was an admirer of the Trinidadian novelist V. S. Naipaul. Vianen died in Paramaribo on 6 January 2019 at the age of 83.
