= Johannes Helstone =

Surinamese composer (1853–1927)

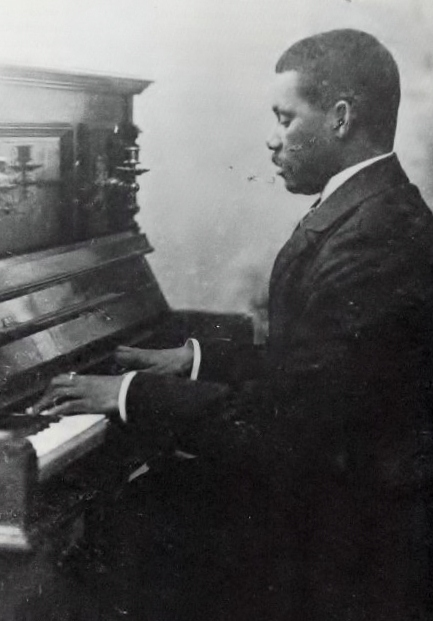
- Helstone in 1890
- Born: Nicodemus Johannes Helstone; 11 January 1853; Berg en Dal, Surinam
- Died: 24 April 1927 (aged 74); Paramaribo, Suriname
- Occupations: composer, pianist, writer
- Notable work: Het Pand der Goden (1906)

Johannes Helstone, born Nicodemus Johannes Helstone (11 January 1853 – 24 April 1927), was a Surinamese composer, pianist and writer. He is best known for his 1906 opera Het Pand der Goden.

== Biography ==
Helstone was born on the Moravian mission Berg en Dal on 11 January 1853 to Proserpina Ulm and Doris Nicolaas Helstone. He was born enslaved and was granted freedom at age ten, when the Dutch abolished slavery. He was named Nicodemus Johannes Helstone, but used the name Johannes or Johannes Nicolaas. At the age of 14, he was sent to Paramaribo for a teaching degree. His musical talents were noted by Heinrich Williger, the head teacher, who arranged that he could continue his studies at the Royal Conservatory of Music of Leipzig. He followed piano theory and composition under Alfred Richter, the son of Ernst Richter. In 1894, Helstone graduated cum laude.

In 1891, he married Remiline ('Millie') Uckerman, a Surinamese sopranist and piano teacher. The couple divorced in 1899.

Helstone received several offers to work abroad, but decided to return to Suriname. Musically, he was active as a composer, pianist, and organist. Professionally, Helstone was a teacher, and a church organist.

In 1899, his unpublished compositions and two pianos were lost in a fire.

=== Musical career ===
In 1906, Helstone wrote the opera Het Pand der Goden. It premiere was on 10 May 1906 in Paramaribo. The opera received positive reviews in Suriname. He translated the opera to German, and toured Germany, France and Austria where the opera was well received. Helstone received several job offers which he declined.

Other musical works include psalms, a mazurka brillante (1889), a toccata, Prinses Juliana Mars (1903) in honour of the birth of Princess Juliana, Emancipatie Mars (1913) and many songs in Dutch and German.

=== Other work ===
In 1903, Helstone wrote a book about the grammar of Sranan Tongo, the English-based Creole spoken in Suriname. The book is slightly controversial, because Helstone encouraged the Creole population to learn Dutch. In 1924 and 1925, Helstone wrote a five parts series about proverbs in Sranan Tongo. The proverbs are translated in Dutch and German with the occasional equivalent proverb in English, French, or Latin.

In 1921, Helstone was co-founder of the Herrnhutter-Comité, an organisation for the interests of the Moravian Church congregation.

=== Death ===
Helstone died on 24 April 1927 at the age of 74.

== Legacy ==
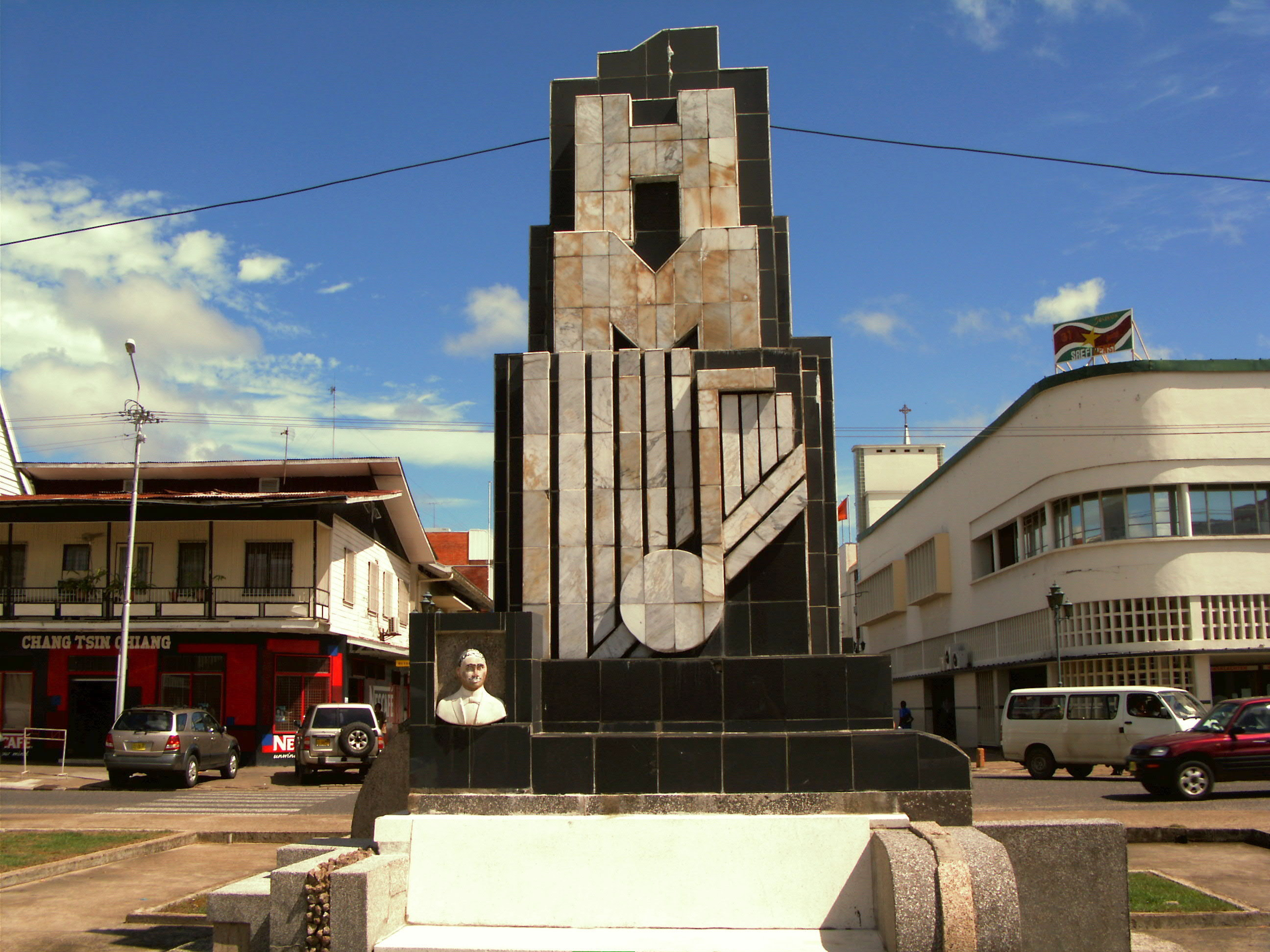
Helstone Monument

In 1944, W.A. Leeuwin made a radio program about Helstone. The broadcast ended with the observation that there were no visible signs of his presence any more.

In 1948, a monument was erected on the north-side of the Centrumkerk, because Helstone had been the organist of the church for many years.

In 1959, Trefossa wrote God zij met ons Suriname, a new national anthem for Suriname. Originally Trefossa used a melody by Helstone. The lyrics were accepted, however the national anthem uses the 1867 melody.

In 2006, the art exhibition hall of the Nationale Volksmuziekschool was named after Nicodemus Johannes Helstone.

On 15 February 2024, Otto Tausk conducted the Royal Concertgebouw Orchestra in the Dutch premiere of Het Pand der Goden in collaboration with Capella Amsterdam. The initiative for this performance came from the Royal Concertgebouw Orchestra and their correspondence with Helstone's great-grandniece Astrid Helstone: they wanted to perform the opera again and went in search of the score. This led them to John Helstone, the composer's great-nephew, who had the manuscripts of the Dutch and German versions of the opera in his possession. Composer and director Leonard Evers used these to create an adaptation suitable for the present day, using the Dutch version for the text and the German version for the music. A video recording of the performance was released online, in addition to audio recordings being made available on Apple Music Classical and Spotify.

Helstone's great-grandniece Astrid Helstone set up the Helstone Fund together with her husband Diederik Burgersdijk under the auspices of the Foundation Concertgebouworkest, with the aim of facilitating performances and research into the work of Johannes Helstone, his students, and other composers from former Dutch colonial territories. Durgersdijk also published a biography on Helstone in 2024, titled "Een opera voor Suriname. Over Het pand der goden van J.N. Helstone".

== Bibliography ==
- Helstone, Johannes (1903). Wan spraakkunst vo taki en skrifi da tongo vo Sranam (in Sranan Tongo and Dutch). Paramaribo: Helstone.
- Helstone, Johannes (1924). Neger-Engelsche spreekwoorden (in Sranan Tongo, Dutch, and German). Paramaribo: Heyden.
- Leeuwin, W.A. (1964). Johannes Nicolaas Helstone. Emancipatie 1863-1963 (in Dutch).
