= Centrumkerk =

Church building in Paramaribo, Suriname

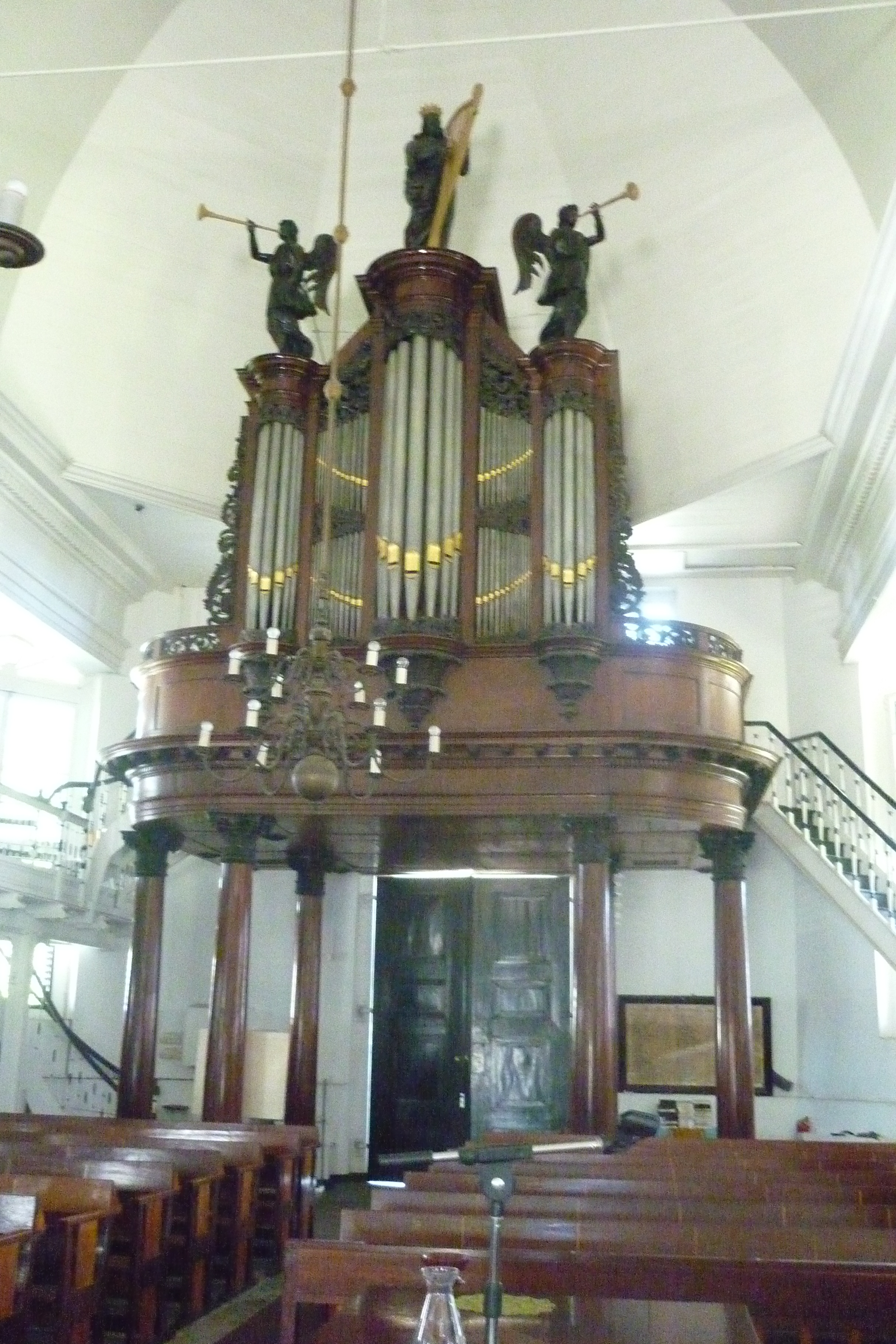
- Organ of the Centrumkerk

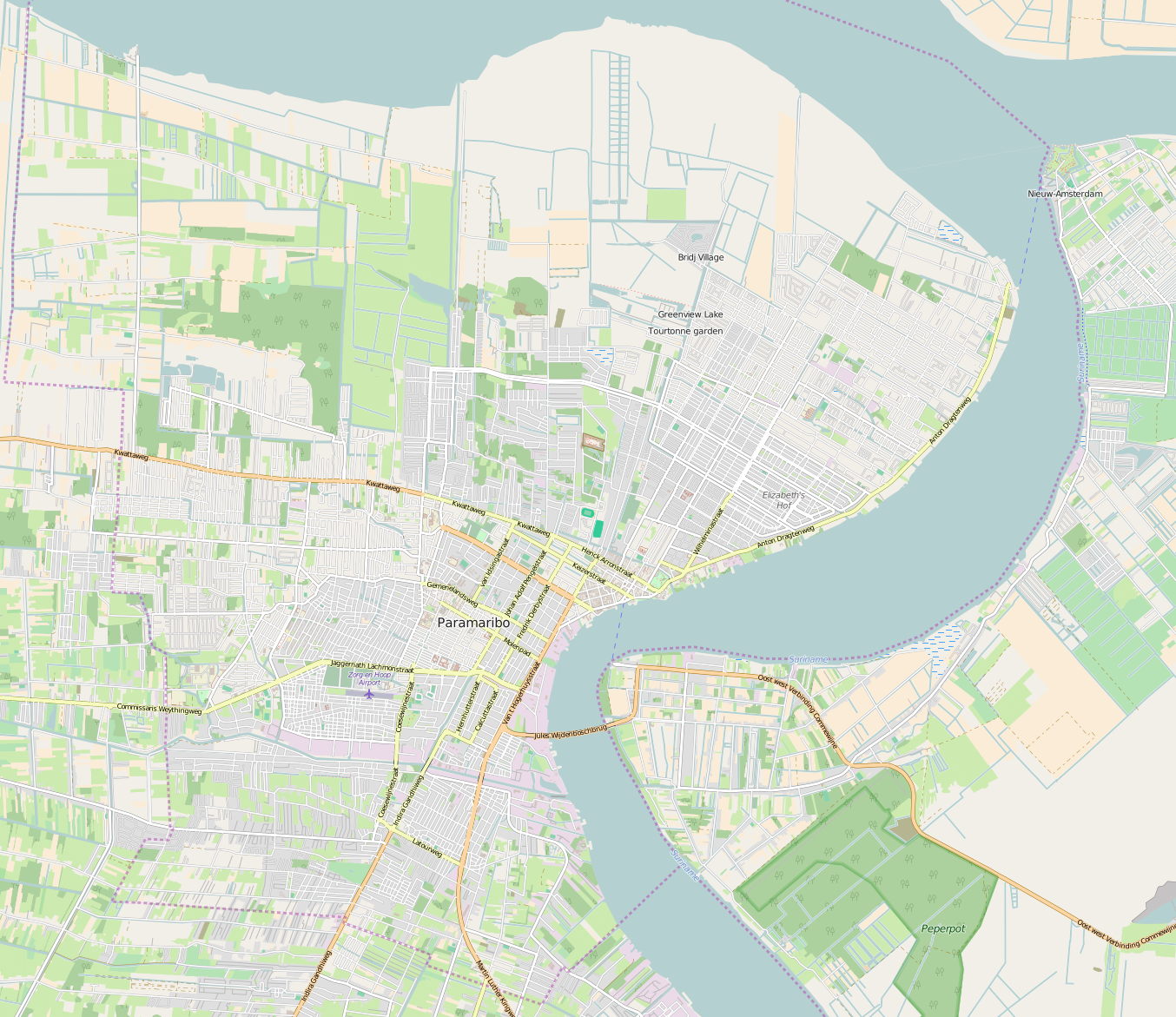
- Location within Paramaribo

General information
- Location: Paramaribo, Suriname
- Coordinates: 5.82718°N 55.15526°W
- Construction started: 1833
- Completed: 5 July 1835
- Client: Dutch Reformed Church of Suriname

Design and construction
- Architect: C.A. Roman

Centrumkerk is a church of the Dutch Reformed Church of Suriname. It is located on Kerkplein in the centre of Paramaribo. It was the state church until independence of Suriname in 1975. The Centrumkerk is a monument, and an UNESCO World Heritage Site. The building is octagonal without a church tower.

== History ==
The first church built at the site was the Oranjetuin. It was shared with the Lutheran church, and was also used as Town Hall. In 1743, the government moved out, and the Lutheran congregation erected their own church in 1747. Around the church was a cemetery. The old church was torn down and replaced by a new octagonal shaped church in 1810. In 1821, the church burnt down in a fire.

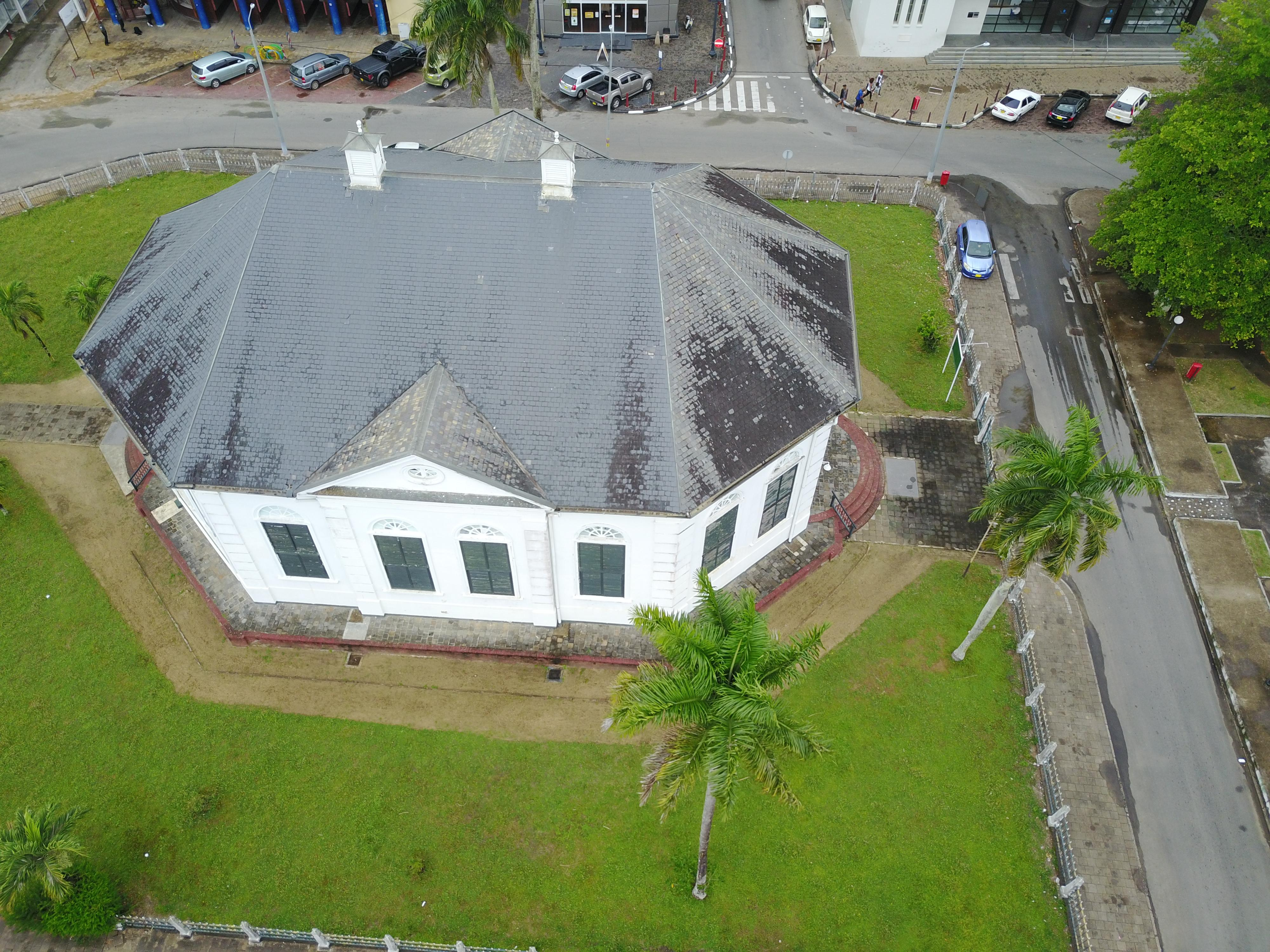

In 1833, construction started on a new church. The architect was C.A. Roman. The Centrumkerk was consecrated on 5 July 1835 with Prince Frederick Henry as honoured guest. however construction continued until 1837. In 1840, Carl Naber was commissioned to build an organ for the church, however the organ was lost at sea. In 1846, a new organ was delivered and installed. The organ has been restored in 1966.

On 25 November 1975, the Centrumkerk was temporarily used as parliament building. The official transfer of sovereignty was signed in the church.

== Monuments ==
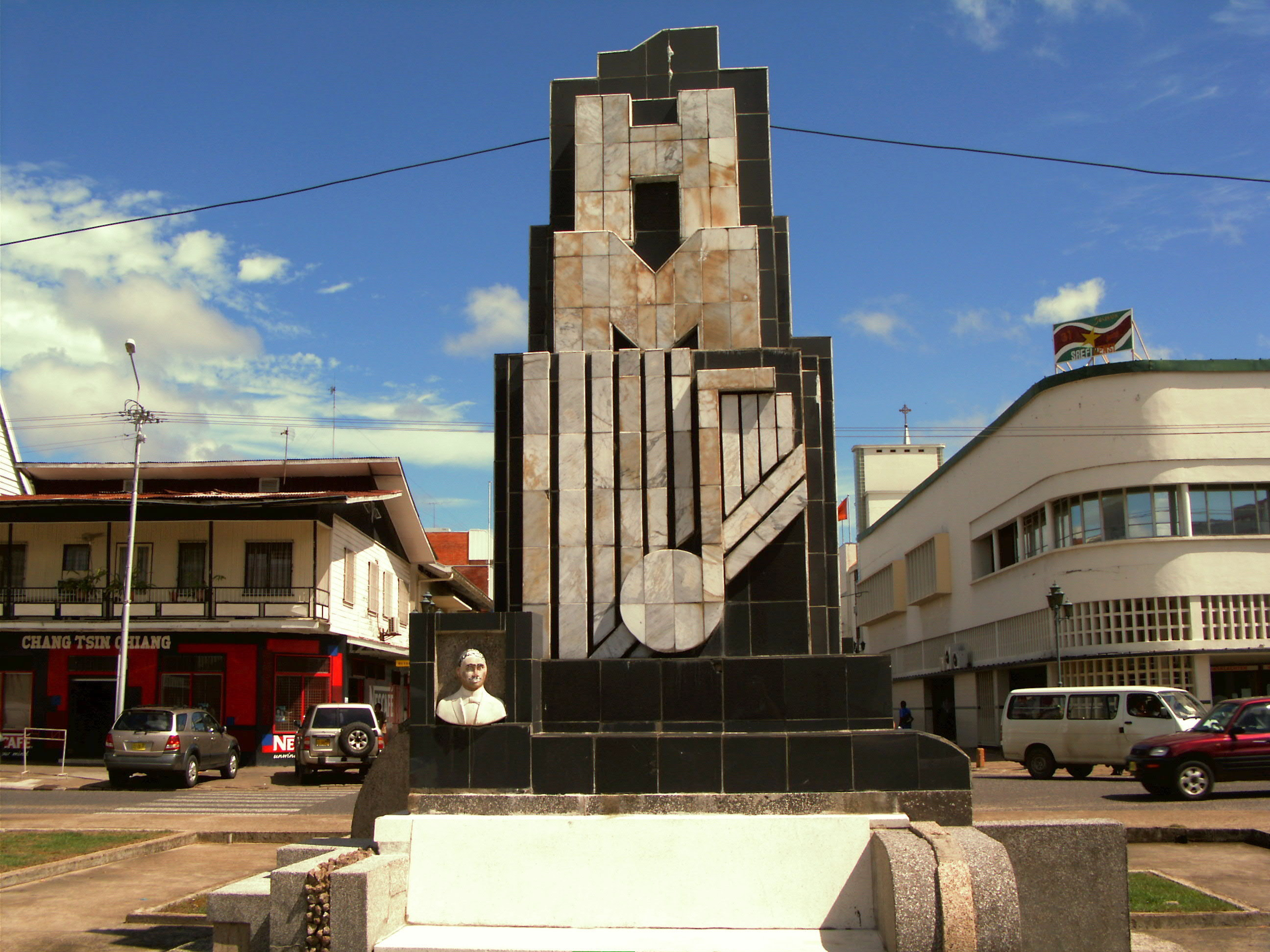
Helstone monument

In 1944, W.A. Leeuwin made a radio program about Johannes Nicolaas Helstone, a composer and pianist. The broadcast ended with the observation that there were no visible signs of his presence any more. In 1948, a monument was erected on the north-side of the church honouring Helstone.

In 1955, a statue of Simón Bolívar was placed on the south-side. The statue was a gift from Venezuela.
