= Waag (Paramaribo) =

Weigh house in Paramaribo, Suriname

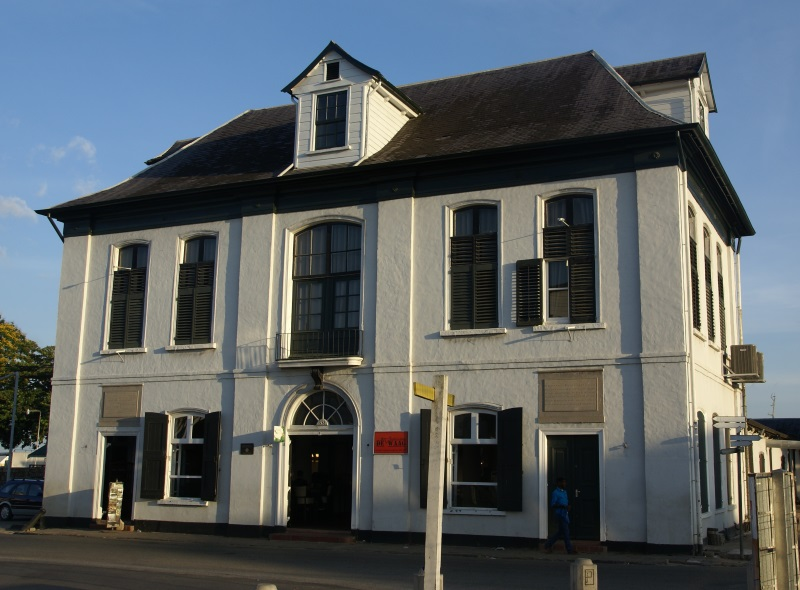

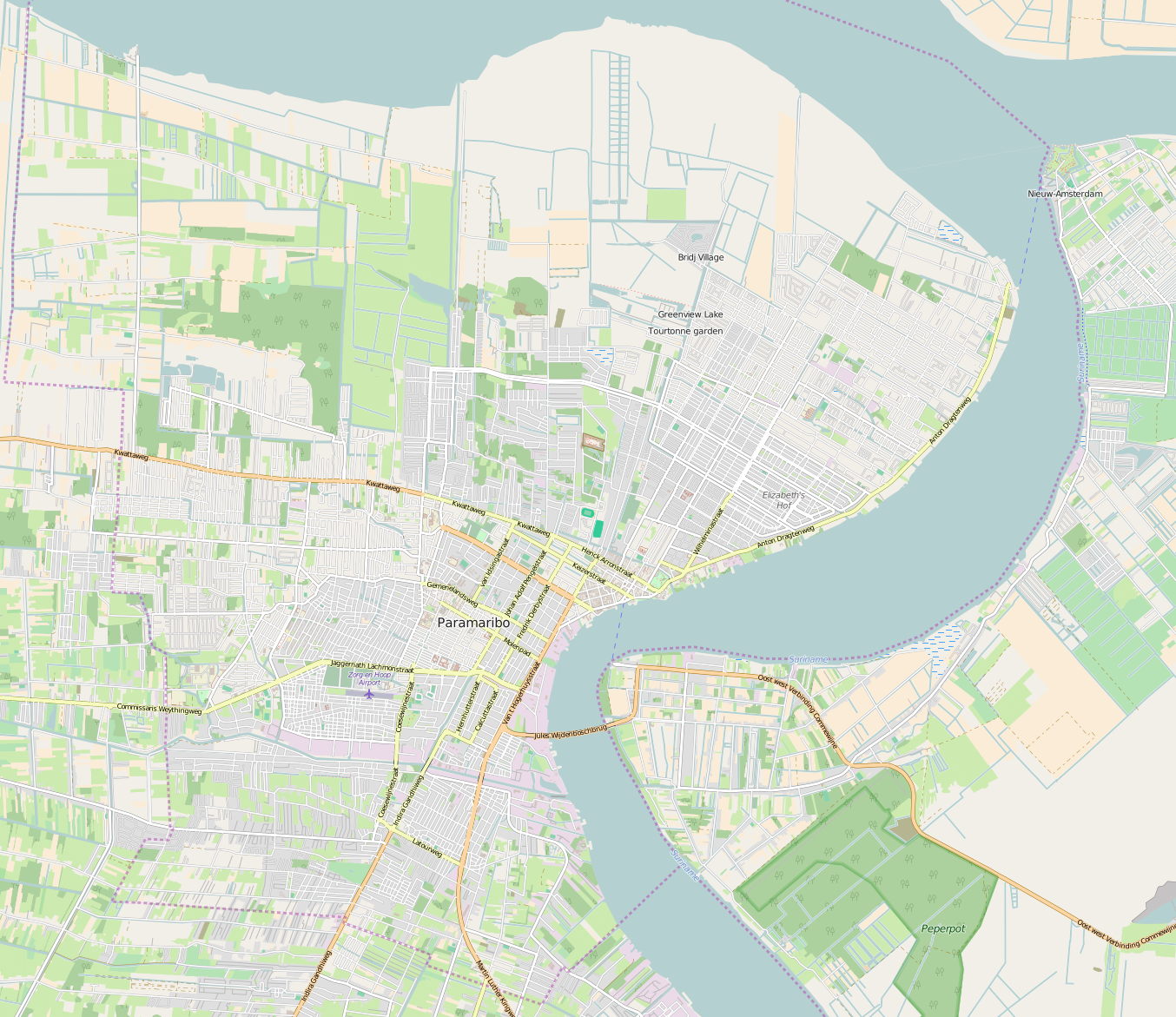
- Location within Paramaribo

General information
- Location: Paramaribo, Suriname
- Coordinates: 5.82461°N 55.15417°W
- Completed: 1824
- Client: Restaurant, Rotary Club

Design and construction
- Architect: Willem de Vroome

The Waag is a former weigh house on the Waterkant in the historic centre of Paramaribo, Suriname. The building is a monument, and a UNESCO World Heritage Site.

== History ==
The Waag was built around 1686 to uniformly weigh and levy taxes on goods arriving in the colony. It was located in the harbour near the warehouses of the Dutch West India Company, and was initially a basic building. It which was extended several times, and a wharf was constructed nearby on the Suriname River.

In January 1821, a fire consumed a large part of the city centre including de Waag An architectural competition was organized to rebuild the building. Willem de Vroome was the architect in charge of the rebuilding, and in 1824, the current building was completed.

== Building ==
The Waag has been constructed with plastered brick, and is one of the few historic buildings in the centre not made out of wood. The building has two stories, and two 12 metre long piers extending towards the river. Inside the building is a wide open space supported by four massive columns, allowing the merchants to arrive with horse and carriage. On the second floor, there was an office of the Bank of Suriname.

== Current situation ==
In 1965, the harbours were relocated to Beekhuizen, and the building started to decay. The old depots near the Waag were demolished. At the late 1980s, Stichting Waag (Waag Foundation) was established to preserve and restore the building. In 2007, a restaurant was opened in the building. The Rotary Club is located in the Waag as well. Nowadays, the Waag is known as a tourist attraction, and part of the night life.
