= Henri Frans de Ziel =

Surinamese writer (1916–1975)

Trefossa
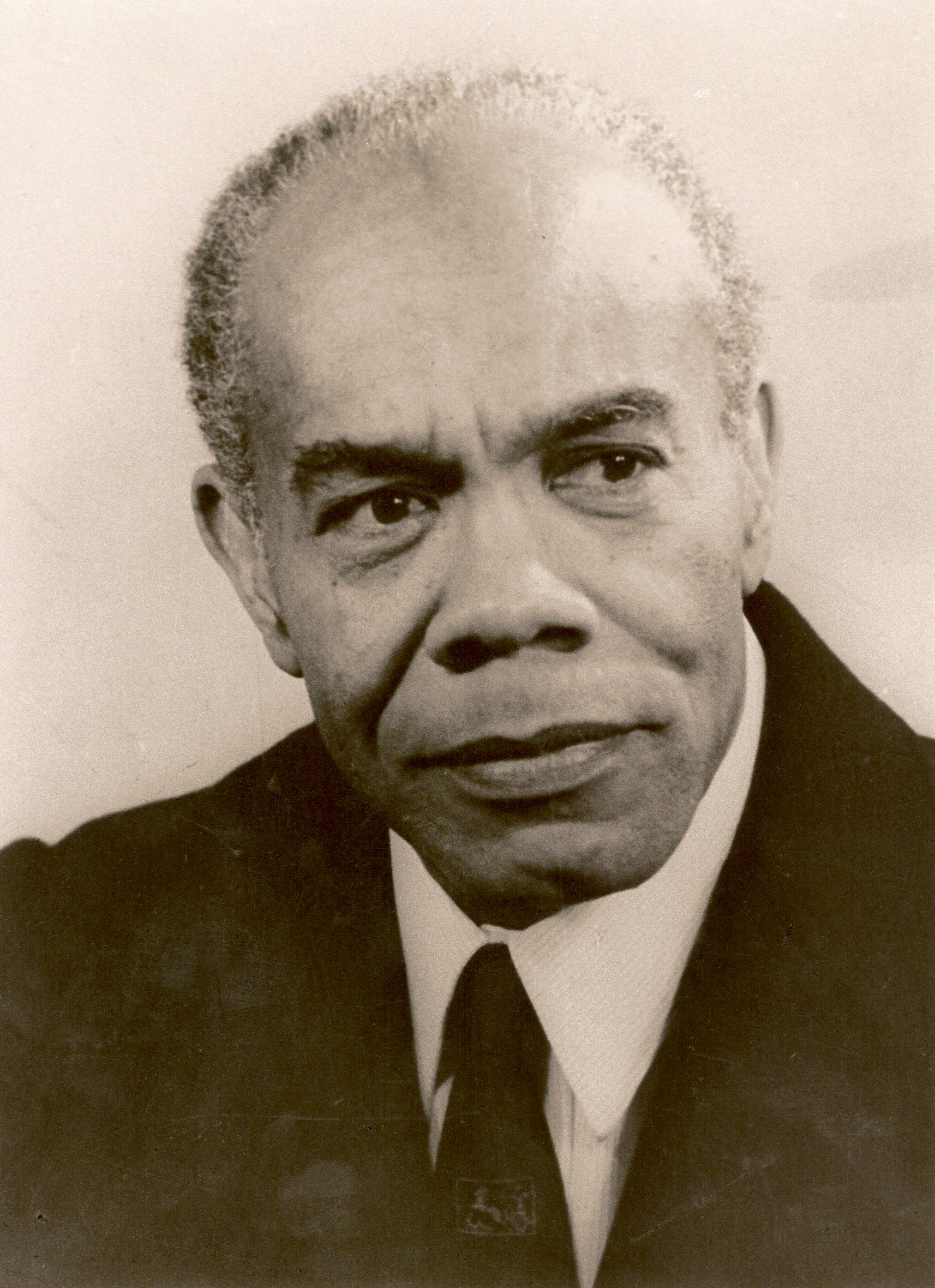
- Born: Henri Frans de Ziel; 15 January 1916; Paramaribo, Suriname
- Died: 3 February 1975 (aged 59); Haarlem, Netherlands
- Occupations: writer, poet, teacher
- Writing career
- Language: Dutch; Sranan Tongo
- Notable works: God zij met ons Suriname (Suriname's National Anthem)

Henri Frans de Ziel (15 January 1916 – 3 February 1975), working under the pen name of Trefossa, was a neoromantic writer in Dutch and Sranan Tongo from Suriname. He is best known for the Sranan Tongo stanzas of Suriname's National Anthem.

== Biography ==
He was an educator and lived in the Netherlands from 1953 to 1956. Upon his return to Suriname he was part of the editorial staff of the magazines Tongoni (1958–1959) and Soela (1962–1964). He also served briefly as the director-librarian of Suriname's Cultural Centre (Cultureel Centrum Suriname (CCS)). He subsequently returned to the Netherlands to work on the publication of Johannes King's memoirs.

Trefossa wrote primarily about the beauty of his native country, Suriname, especially as a source of peace to the restless mind. He influenced many writers in Suriname, including Corly Verlooghen, Eugène Rellum, Johanna Schouten-Elsenhout and Michaël Slory, but the depth and subtlety of his verse remain almost unique.

Trefossa was annoyed about the negative nuance in the National Anthem at time, and started to transform the second stanza into a positive message. Trefossa combined this with a poem he wrote in Sranan Tongo on the death of Ronald Elwin Kappel. His anthem was unanimously approved by the Government of Suriname on 7 December 1959. De Ziel originally used a melody by Johannes Helstone, however the government preferred the original 1876 melody.

In 1969, his health started to deteriorate, and he was admitted to the sanatorium Zonneduin in Bloemendaal. Here he met his wife, Hulda Walser, whom he married in 1970. On 3 Februari 1975, de Ziel died in Haarlem.

On 21 November 2005, a monument was dedicated in his honour on the Sophie Redmondstraat in Paramaribo. His ashes and the ashes of his wife, Hulda Walser, were also placed at the monument. A documentary film, Trefossa: I Am Not I (Trefossa: Mi a no mi), by filmmaker Ida Does, was produced in 2008.

== Poem ==
The poem by Trefossa, referenced in the external link about the mural at the bottom, is translated from Sranan into English below:

Gronmama	Earthmother
Mi a no mi solanga mi brudu fu yu a n'e trubu na ini den dusun titei fu mi	I am not myself until my blood is infused with you in all of my veins
Mi a no mi solang mi lutu n'e saka, n'e sutu mi gronmama	I am not myself until my roots sink down, shoot into you, my earthmother
Mi a no mi solang m'no krari fu kibri, fu tyari yu gersi na ini mi dyodyo.	I am not myself until I manage to keep, to carry your image in my soul
Mi a no mi solanga y' n'e bari f' prisir' ofu pen na ini mi sten.	I am not myself until you cry out with pleasure, or pain in my voice

== Sources ==
- Michiel van Kempen: Een geschiedenis van de Surinaamse literatuur. De Geus, Breda 2003, ISBN 90-445-0277-8.
  According to the Dutch page of this article, Michiel van Kempen has given Wikipedia permission to use the above mentioned work.
