= Waterkant =

Street in Paramaribo, Suriname

Coordinates: 5.82518°N 55.15303°W

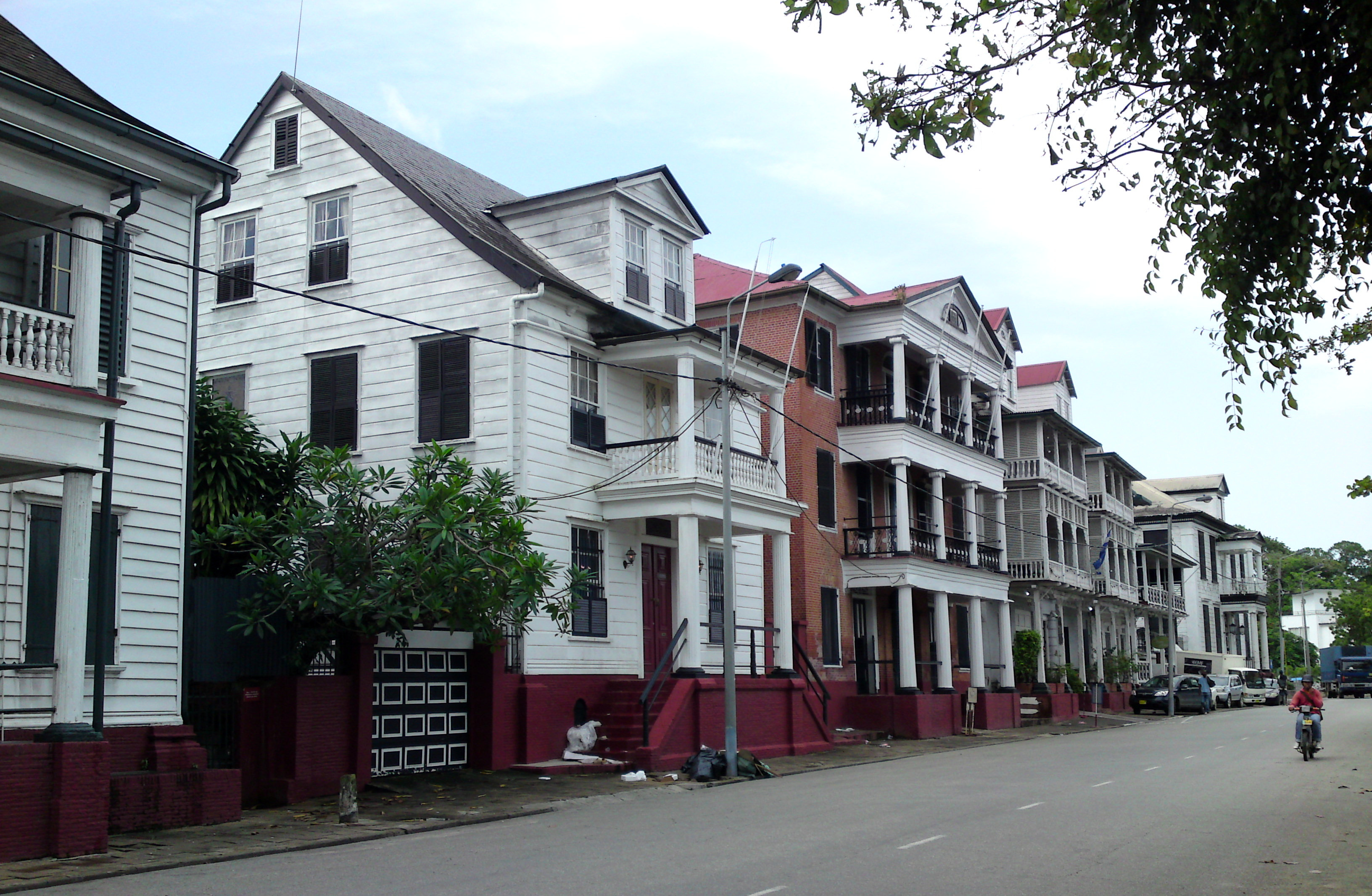
Monumental buildings on the Waterkant

The Waterkant is the oldest and one of the most important streets of Paramaribo, Suriname. The street is located in the historic centre on the Suriname River, and was the location where ships used to arrive. The street starts at the Onafhankelijkheidsplein and extends to the Central Market. As of 2002, it has been designated a Unesco World Heritage Site.

== History ==
Paramaribo was founded in 1613 by Stoffel Albertszoon near the indigenous village Parmurbo. According to a legend, it was named after chief "Para Maro" who built a quay near the Garden of Palms. The quay was named Rembo (English: waterside Dutch: waterkant), hence Para Maro Rembo.

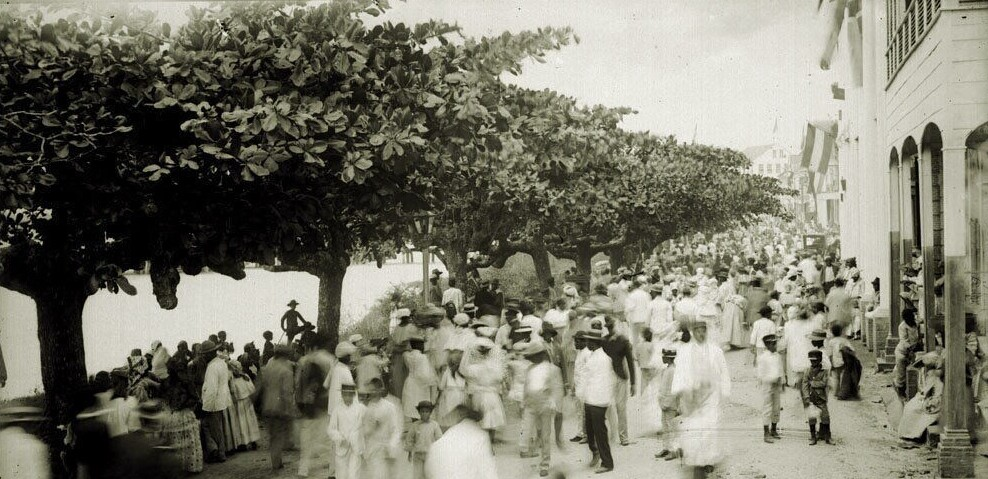
Waterkant during a holiday (1890s)

Van Sommelsdijck captured Suriname from the British in 1683, and found 27 or 28 houses around Fort Zeelandia. He started to extend the village along Waterkant and Gravenstraat. The Suriname River near Waterkant is more than one kilometre wide, and provided plenty of space for ships. It was therefore the location where the ships were loaded and unloaded.

On 21 January 1821, a major fire started at the corner of Waterkant and Onafhankelijkheidsplein which destroyed about 400 houses in the centre of the city. The street was given a new façade by city architect Johan August who designed monumental white wooden buildings with galleries.

== 21st century ==
Waterkant has remained one of the most important and busiest streets of the city. On the waterside of the street, there are many food stalls and terraces. The street is aligned with important buildings like the Weigh House, the Central Bank, the Ministry of Social Affairs, the Central Market and the Martin Luther Church. All buildings are made of wood except for the Weigh House and the Central Bank which are built in stone, and a brick house at number 10. The ferry to Meerzorg is located on Waterkant.

=== Redevelopment in 2024/25 ===
In 2020, preparations began for the redevelopment of the Waterkant, from the Waag to the Onafhankelijkheidsplein (Independence Square). It is part of the Paramaribo Urban Rehabilitation Program (PURP). Construction began around May 2024. In November 2025, the section up to the Stenen Trap ('Stone Stairs') was opened, featuring a completely newly designed Craft Market, hospitality venues with terraces, a small urban park, a playground, benches, a boulevard, and public restrooms.

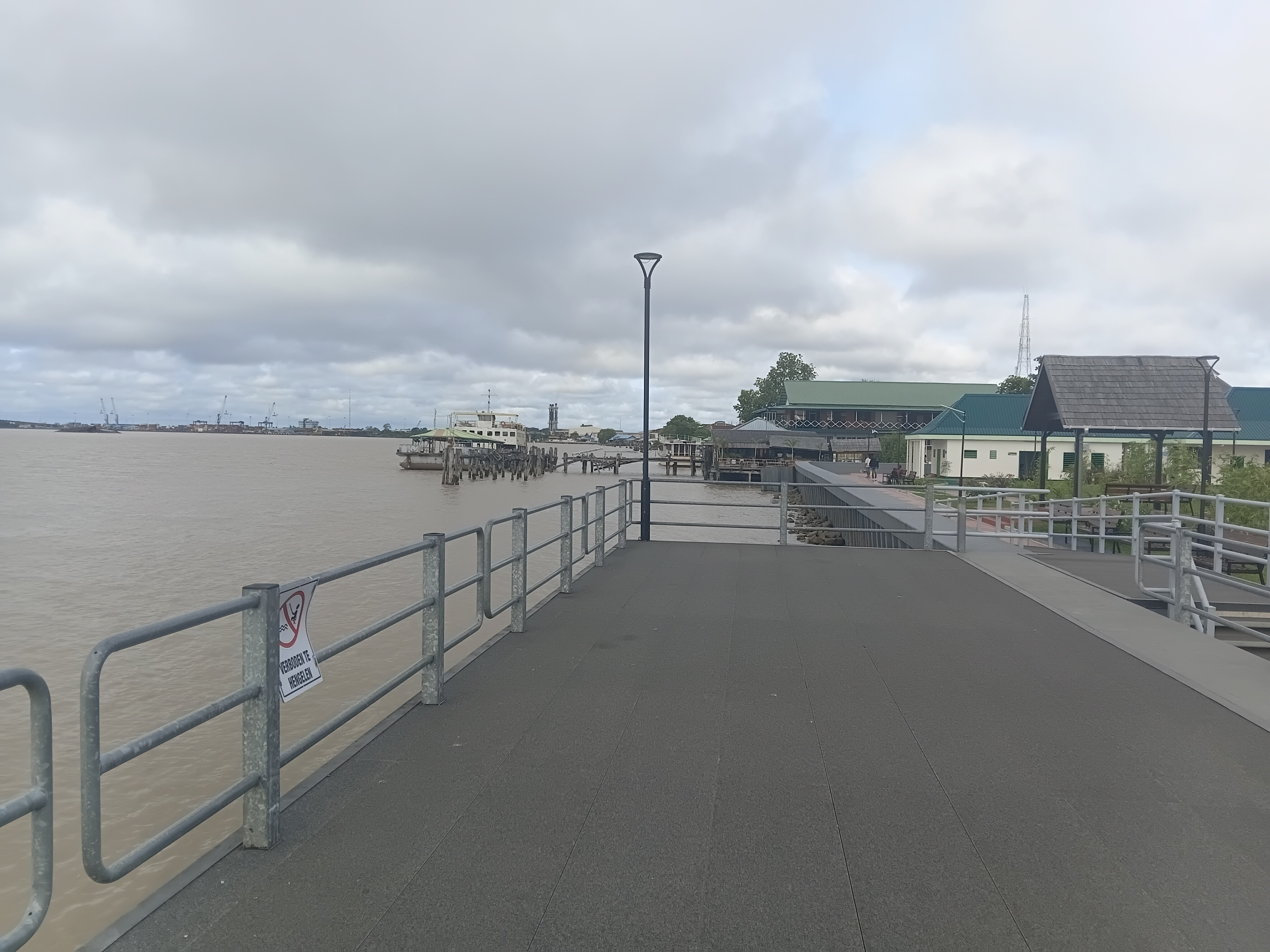

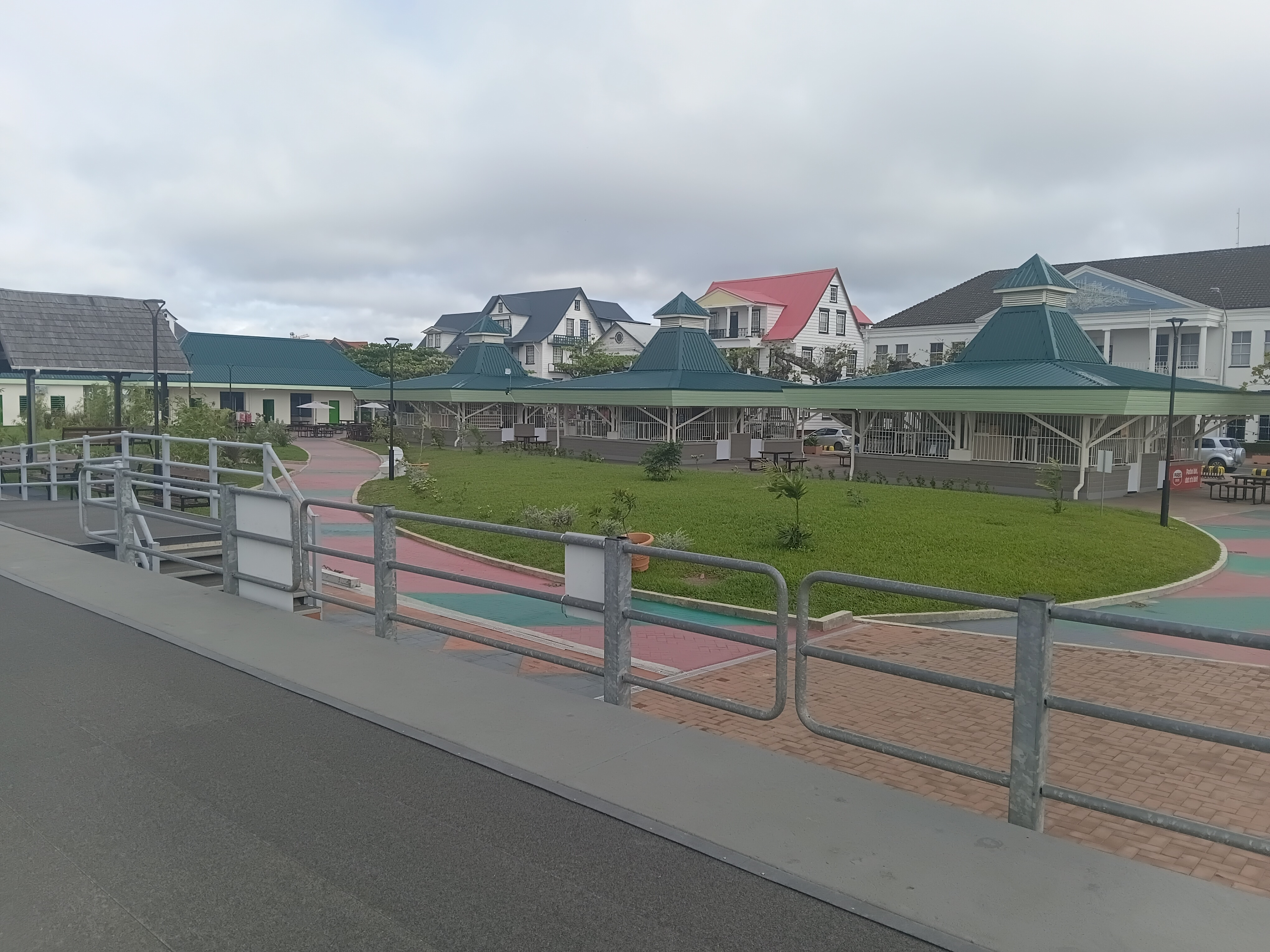

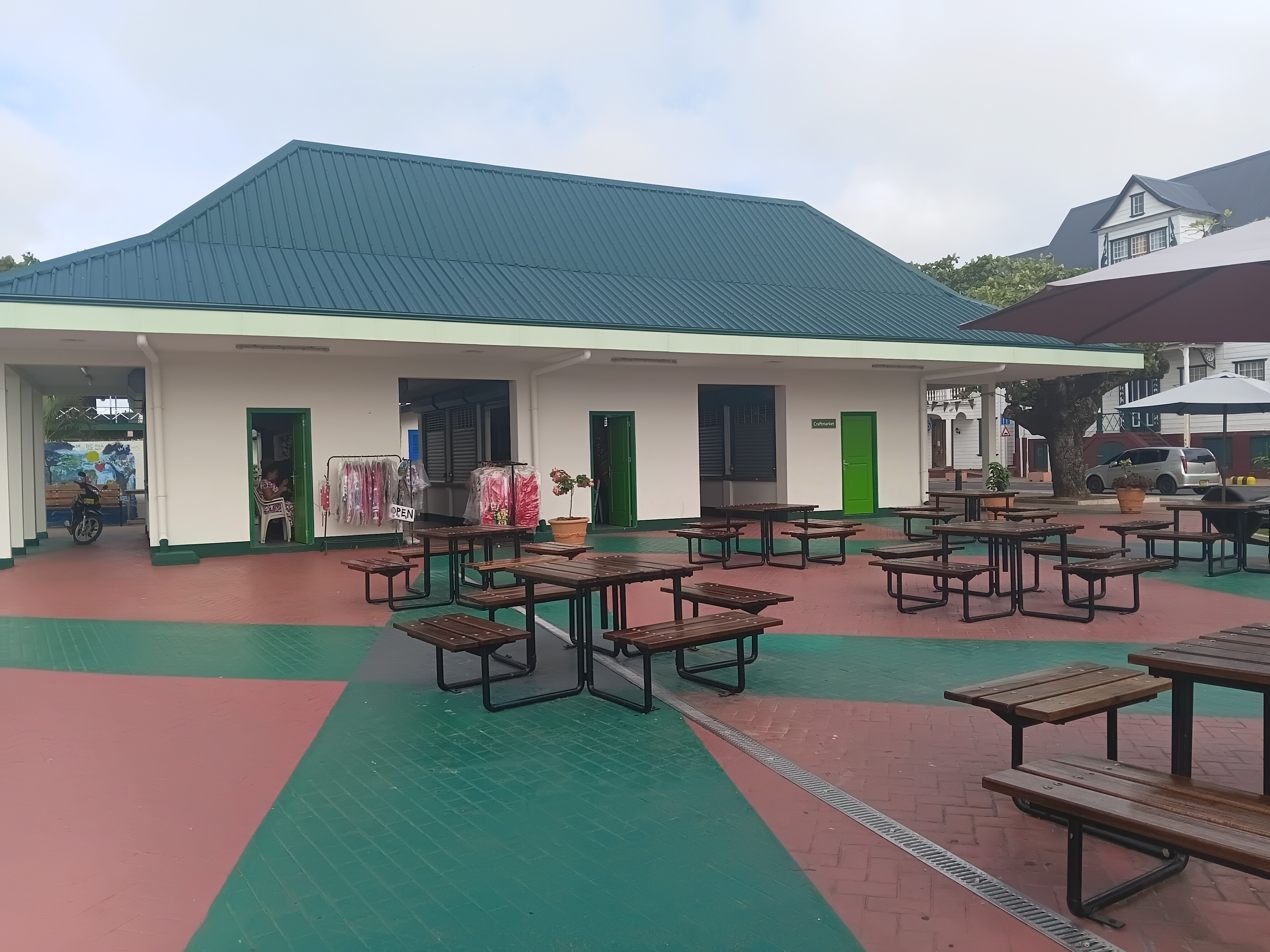

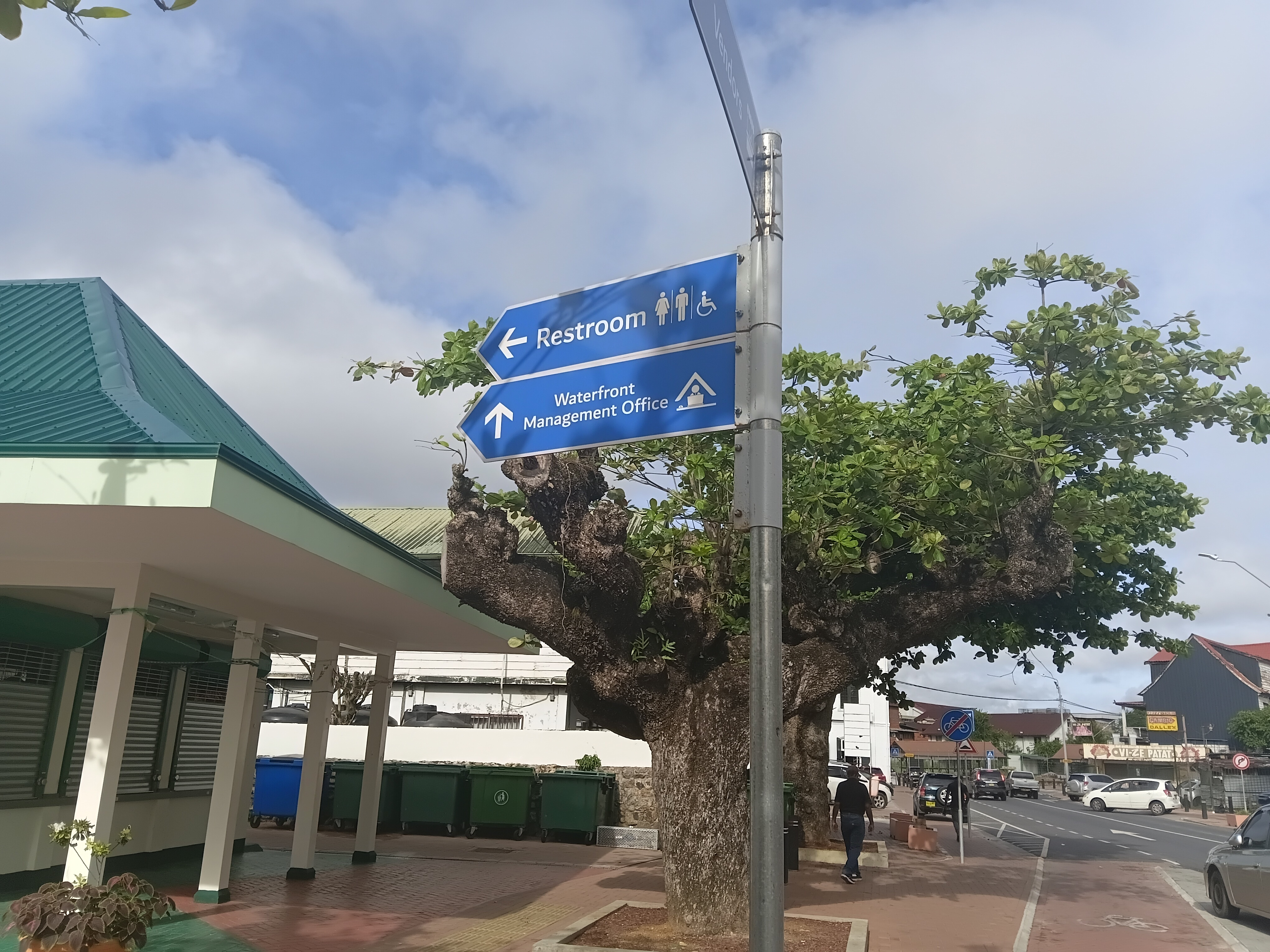

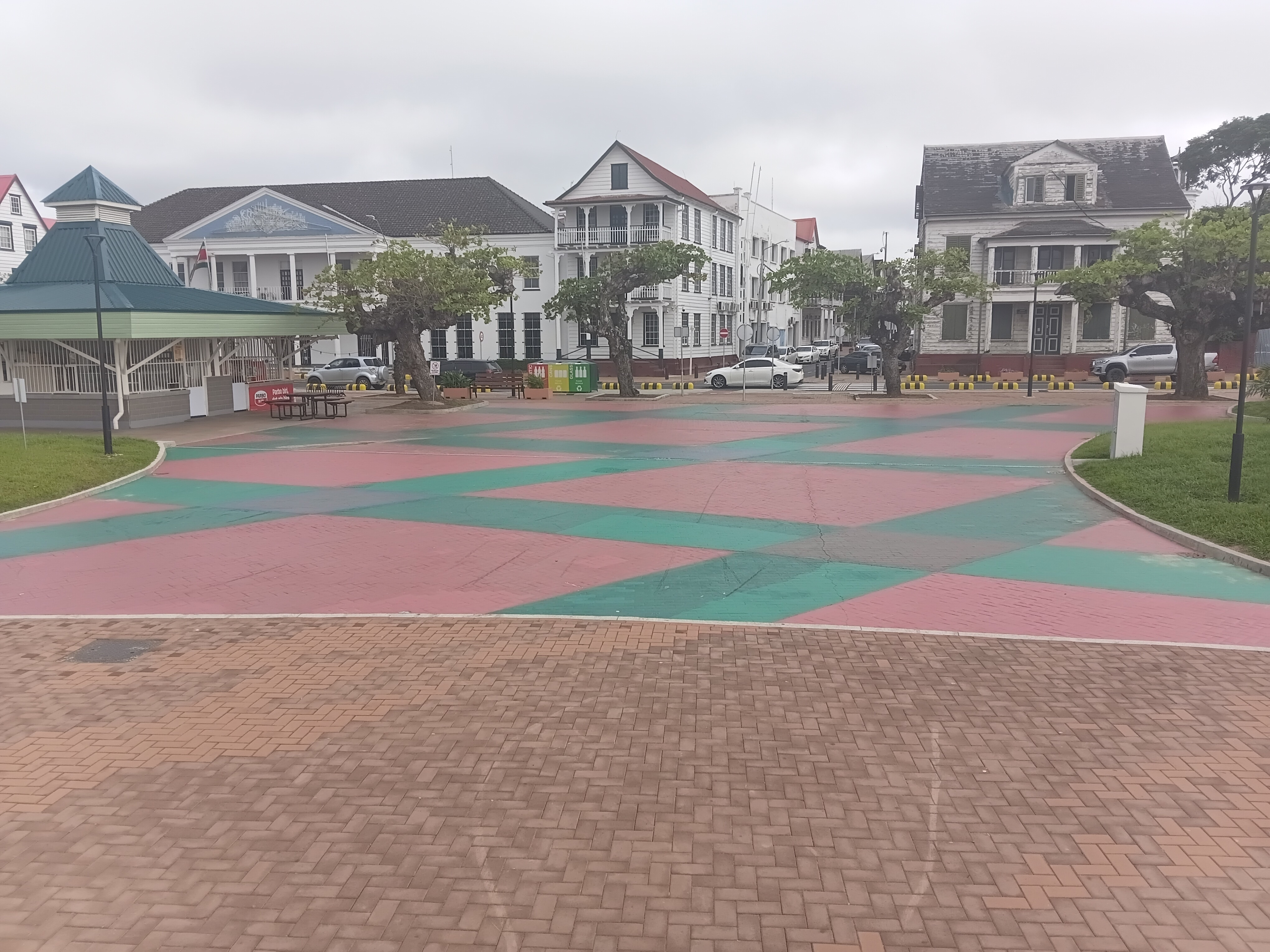

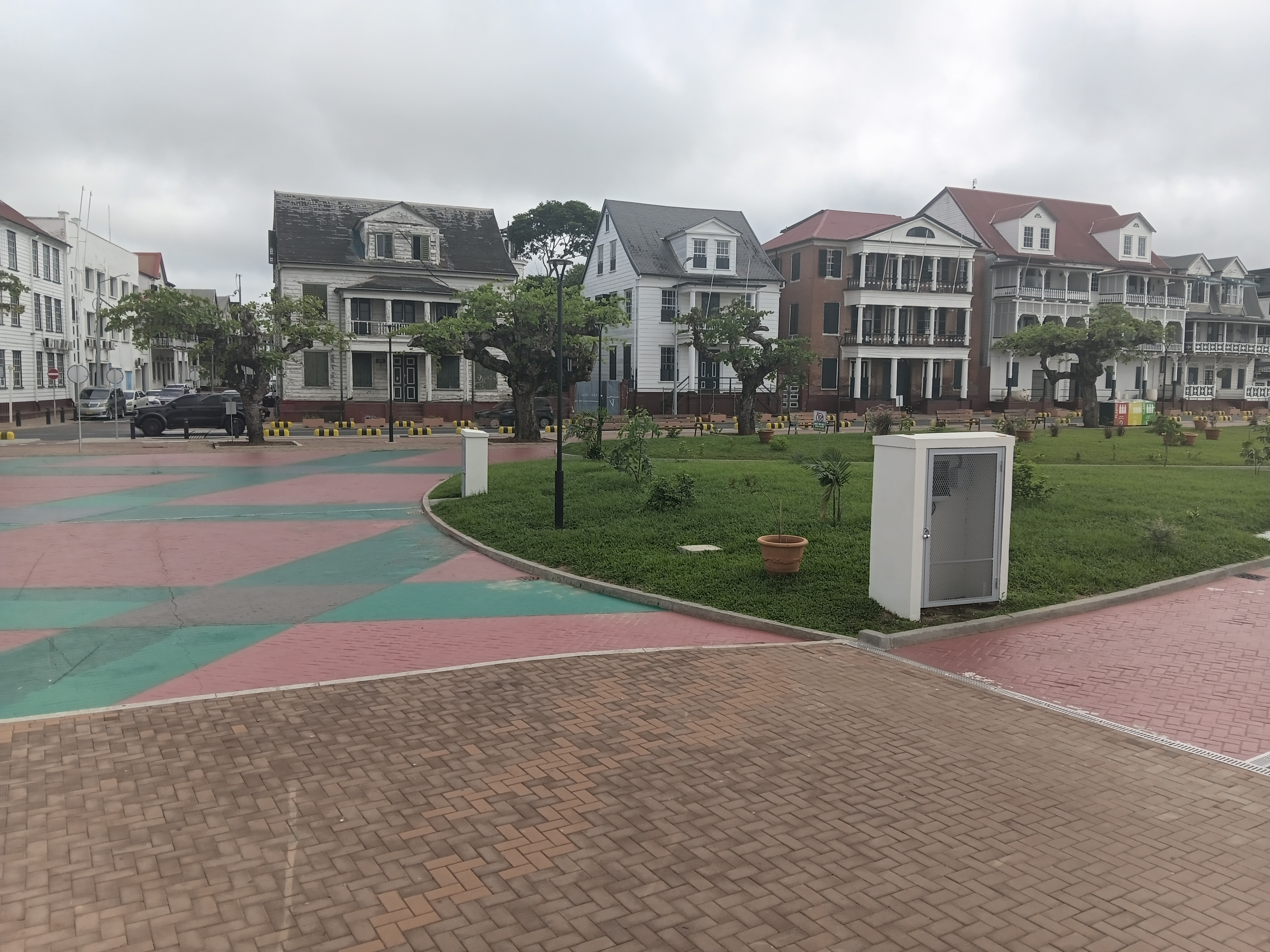

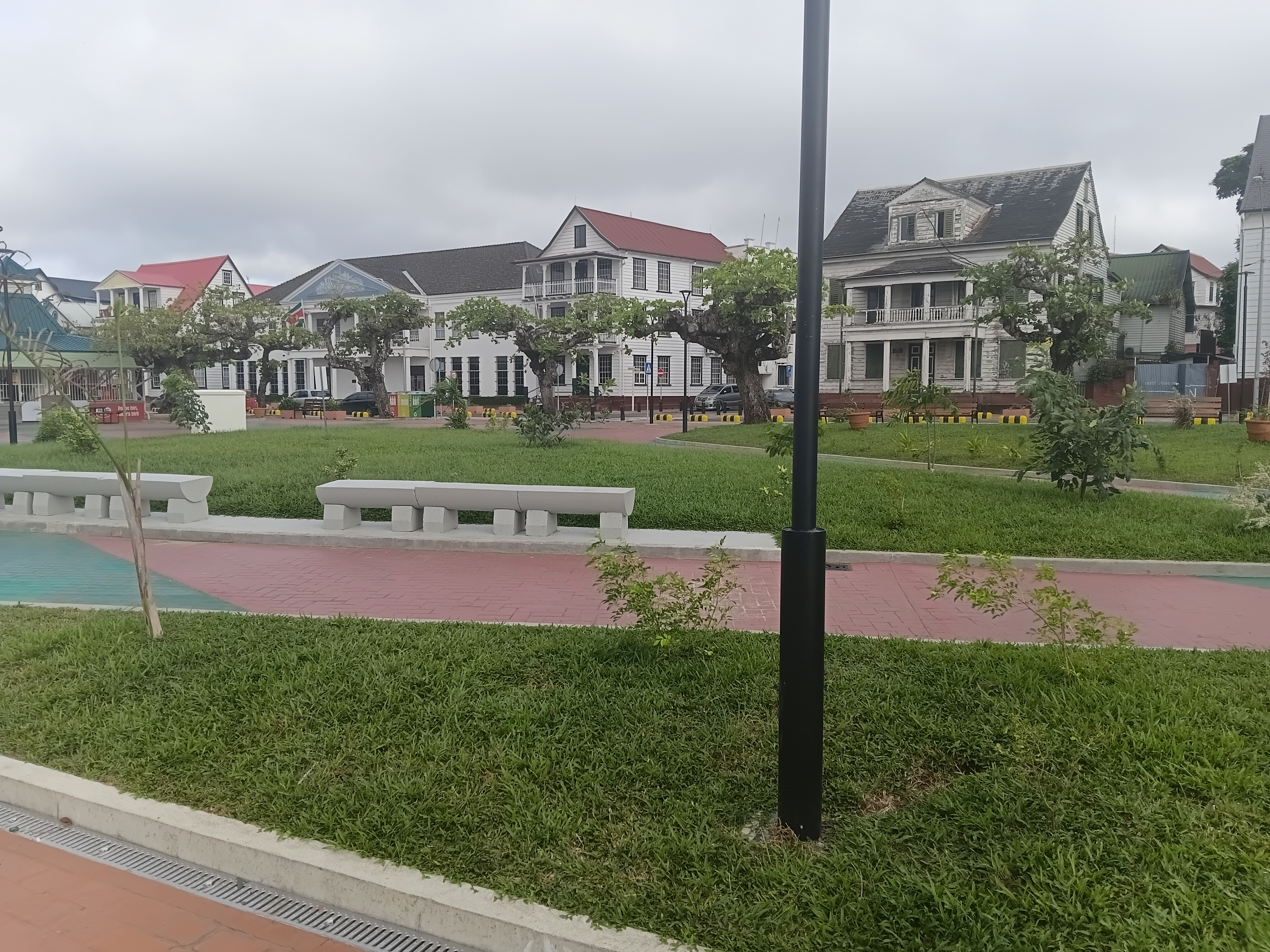

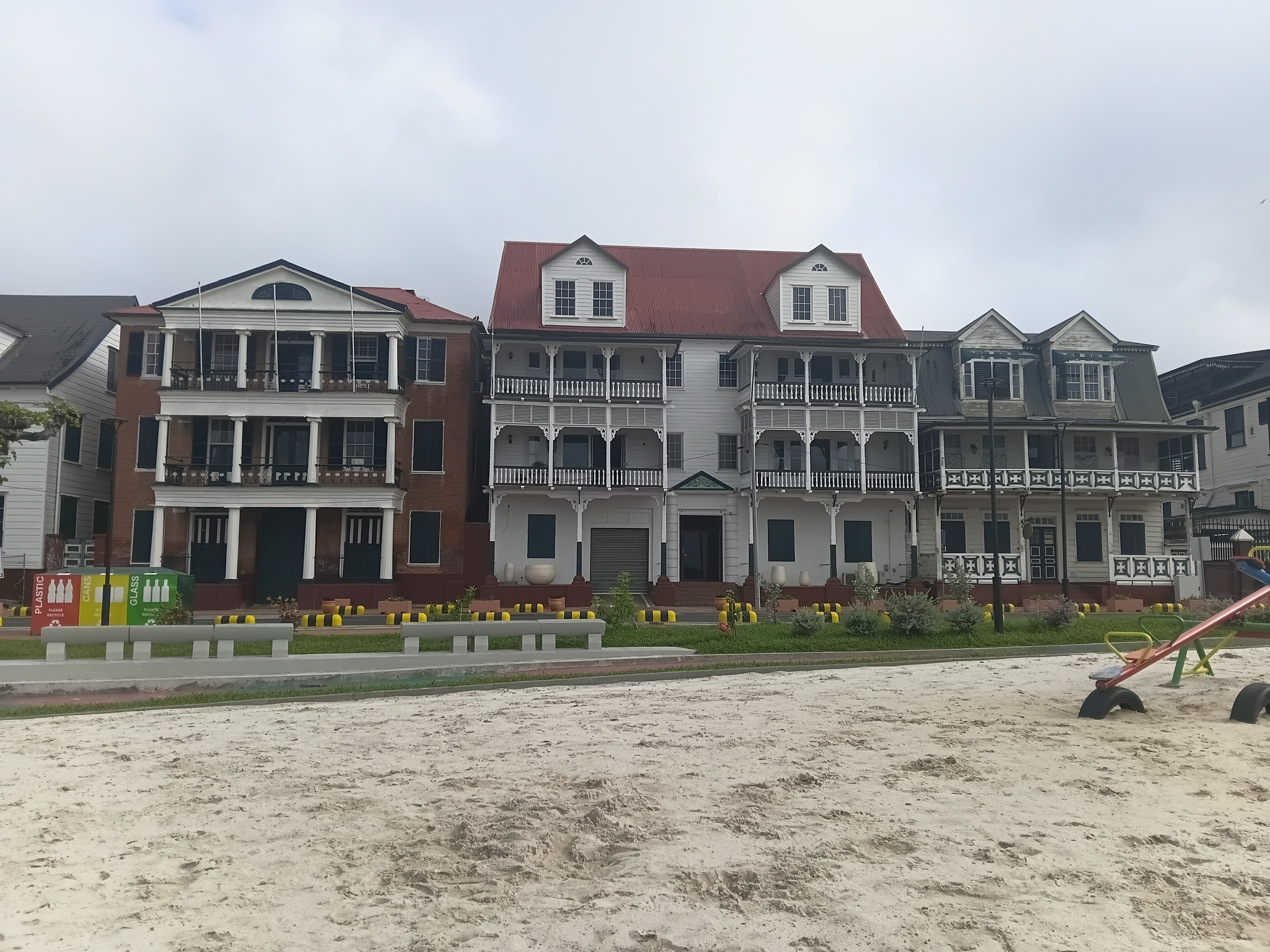

== Bibliography ==
- Benjamins, Herman Daniël; Snelleman, Johannes (1917). Encyclopaedie van Nederlandsch West-Indië (in Dutch). Leiden: Martinus Nijhoff Publishers.
