= Sranan Tongo phonology and orthography =

Sounds and writing system of the Sranan Tongo language

Sranan Tongo, or for short Sranan, an English-based creole language spoken by many people in Suriname, is not an official language of Surinam but it has an extensive body of written literature dating back to the 18th century. Until the middle of the 20th century, most written texts in Sranan, seen at the time as a low-prestige language, used a spelling that was not standardized but based on Dutch orthography. In view of the considerable differences between the phonologies of Sranan and Dutch, this was not a satisfactory situation.

With the emergence of a movement striving for the emancipation of Sranan as a respectable language, the need for a phonology-based orthography was felt. A more suitable orthography developed as an informal consensus from the publications of linguists studying Sranan and related creoles. For every-day use, the Dutch-based spelling remained common, while some literary authors adopted (variants of) the linguistic spelling.

To end this chaotic situation, the Surinamese government commissioned a committee of linguists and writers to define a standard spelling, which was adopted and came into force in 1986. This standard basically followed the linguistic consensus. However, as the language is not being taught in schools, while Dutch is, most speakers are not clearly aware of the principles on which this spelling is based and keep using a Dutchish, varying spelling.

The main points are summarized in the following tables. In the IPA columns, a comma-separated list indicates allophones. The "Dutch" spelling may vary from writer to writer, or even within a single text.

== Monophthongs ==
IPA	standard	“Dutch”
a	a	a
e, ə	e	i, e
ɛ	è	e
i	i	ie, i
o	o	o
ɔ	ò	o
u	u	oe

/a/ may be realised as [a̠ ~ ɑ̟], /e/ as [e̝ ~ ɪ̞] and /o/ as [ɔ̝ ~ ʊ̞].

== Diphthongs ==
IPA	standard	“Dutch”
ai̯	ai	ai, aj
ei̯	ei	ee, é
ɛi̯	èi	ei, ij
oi̯	oi	oi, oj
au̯	aw	auw
ou̯	ow	o

== Consonants ==
IPA	standard	“Dutch”
b	b	b, bb
d	d	d, dd
d͡ʒ	dy	dj
f	f	f, ff
ɡ, ɟ**	g	g, gg, k, kk
h	h	h
k, c**	k	k, kk, tj
l	l	l, ll
m	m	m, mm
n, ŋ*	n	n, nn, ng

IPA	standard	“Dutch”
ŋ*	ng	ng
ɲ	ny	nj
p	p	p, pp
ɾ, r	r	r, rr
s	s	s, ss
ʃ	sy	sj
t	t	t, tt
t͡ʃ	ty**	tj, tsj
w	w	w
j	y	j
z	z	z

*When syllable-final, the /n/ slightly nasalizes the preceding vowel. Also, it is then sometimes realized as [ŋ], especially at the end of a sentence or a phrase that is followed by a pause – and thus also when the word is spoken in isolation. For example, the word "Sranan" may be realized as [sraˈnãŋ]. This pronunciation is reflected in the "Dutch" spelling by writing ⟨ng⟩, as in "Sranang", but not in the standard spelling. In other (not word-final) cases /ŋ/ is not an allophone of /n/ but a phoneme in its own right, always spelled ⟨ng⟩, as in tongo (/ˈto.ŋo/)
**The phoneme /ɡ/, when followed by /e/ or /i/, is palatalized to [ɟ] or even further lenited to [j], so that a word like "angisa" is realized as [anˈɟi.sa] or [anˈji.sa]. (Note that the combination ⟨ng⟩ in this word represents two separate phonemes, similar to the pair ⟨th⟩ in English hothead). Likewise, the phoneme /k/, when followed by /e/ or /i/, is palatalized to [c]; for example, the word "pikin" is commonly realized as [piˈcin]. In informal speech it may be further lenited to [t͡ʃ], so that a word like "pikin" is realized as [piˈt͡ʃiŋ]. In the standard orthography, the spelling ⟨k⟩ is retained in all cases; ⟨ty⟩ is only found before ⟨a⟩, ⟨o⟩ and ⟨u⟩, as in tyari and tyopu. Exceptionally, the variants tye and tyika are accepted spellings for ke and kika used as interjections.

=== Assimilation ===
An /n/ before the labial consonants /b/, /m/ and /p/ tends towards [m], as in granpa ([ˈgram.pa]).

An /n/ before the velar consonants /ɡ/ and /k/ (and their allophones) tends towards [ŋ], slightly nasalizing a preceding vowel, as in kenki ([ˈɟẽŋ.ɟi]).

=== Elision of vowels and gemination ===
Some common particles exist in two versions, with and without an initial consonant: na → a; de → e; go → o. While this may historically correspond to the elision of a consonant, it is not denoted as such in the spelling. In contrast, the elision of a vowel, common in speech, is denoted orthographically by an apostrophe. For example, mi o naki dalèk → m' o naki dalèk. This is frequently done in informal speech when otherwise a hiatus would result. Another common case is a /CV_{1}'CV_{2}/ combination in which the two consonants are the same, as in mama (/ma'ma/), fufuru (/fu'fu.ɾu/) and wiwiri (/wi'wi.ɾi/). (As in these examples, the vowels are also often the same.) The vowel between the consonants may be elided, resulting in a geminated consonant: m'ma (/mːa/), f'furu (/'fːu.ɾu/), w'wiri (/'wːi.ɾi/). A more drastic elision with gemination is seen in ferferi → f'feri (/'fːe.ɾi/).

== Some examples ==
IPA	standard	"Dutch"
ˈfe.ti	feti	fittie
ˈdu.ku	duku	doekoe
ˈskou̯.tu	skowtu	skotoe
ˈwa.ɡi	wagi	waggie
