= Celestine Raalte =

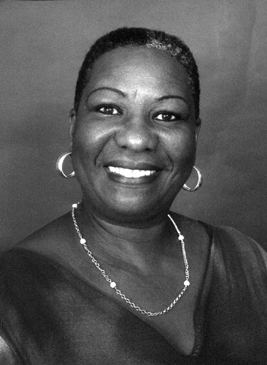
- Born: 12 November 1948 (age 77); Commewijne District, Suriname
- Writing career
- Genres: Poetry, play

Celestine Raalte (born 12 November 1948) is a writer and performance artist from Suriname living in the Netherlands.

She was born in the Commewijne District. During the 1970s, she was a member of the Surinamese women's group Sranan S'ma Abi Wan Oso. Her work first appeared in the 1981 anthology Tide tamara, Dichten voor het volk. Raalte moved to Utrecht in 1986. In 1989, she published her first collection of poems, Akwenda / Streven. This was followed by Ma Awitya in 1997. Both works also appeared in Dutch. Celestine Raalte has published works in both Dutch and Sranan Tongo.

Her work has also appeared in various magazines and in the 1995 anthology Spiegel van de Surinaamse poëzie. Raalte also wrote the play Witte de Witlaan 25.

In 1997, she received the Kwakoe Award for her contribution to Surinamese art. She has received the Zami Award twice: once for her fashion designs in 1999 and once for her poetry in 2000. In 2002, she received the Gaanman Gazon Matodja Award. In 2010, she was named an Officer in the Surinamese Honorary Order of the Yellow Star.
