= Central Market (Paramaribo) =

Market place in Paramaribo, Suriname

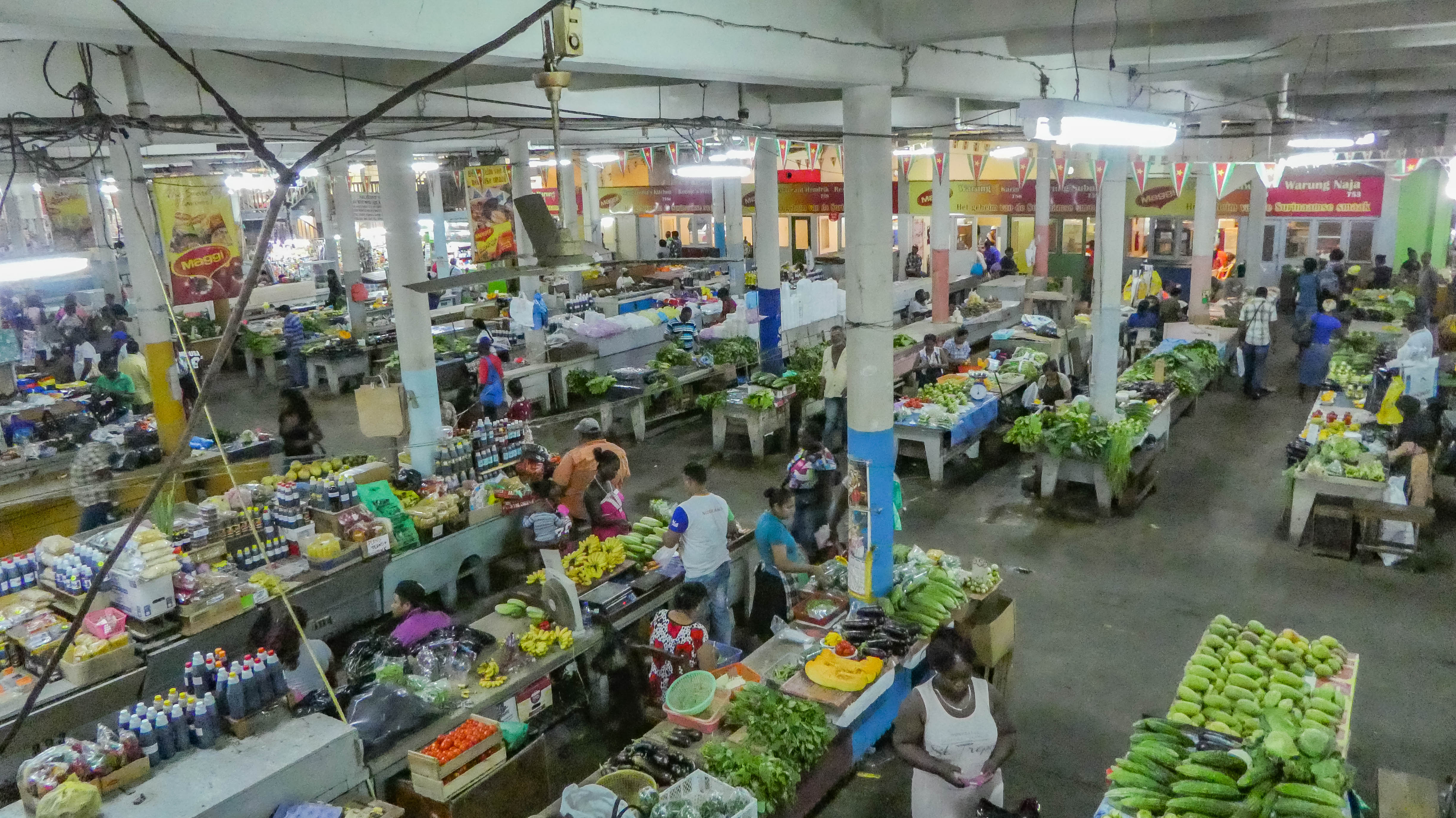
- Inside the central market

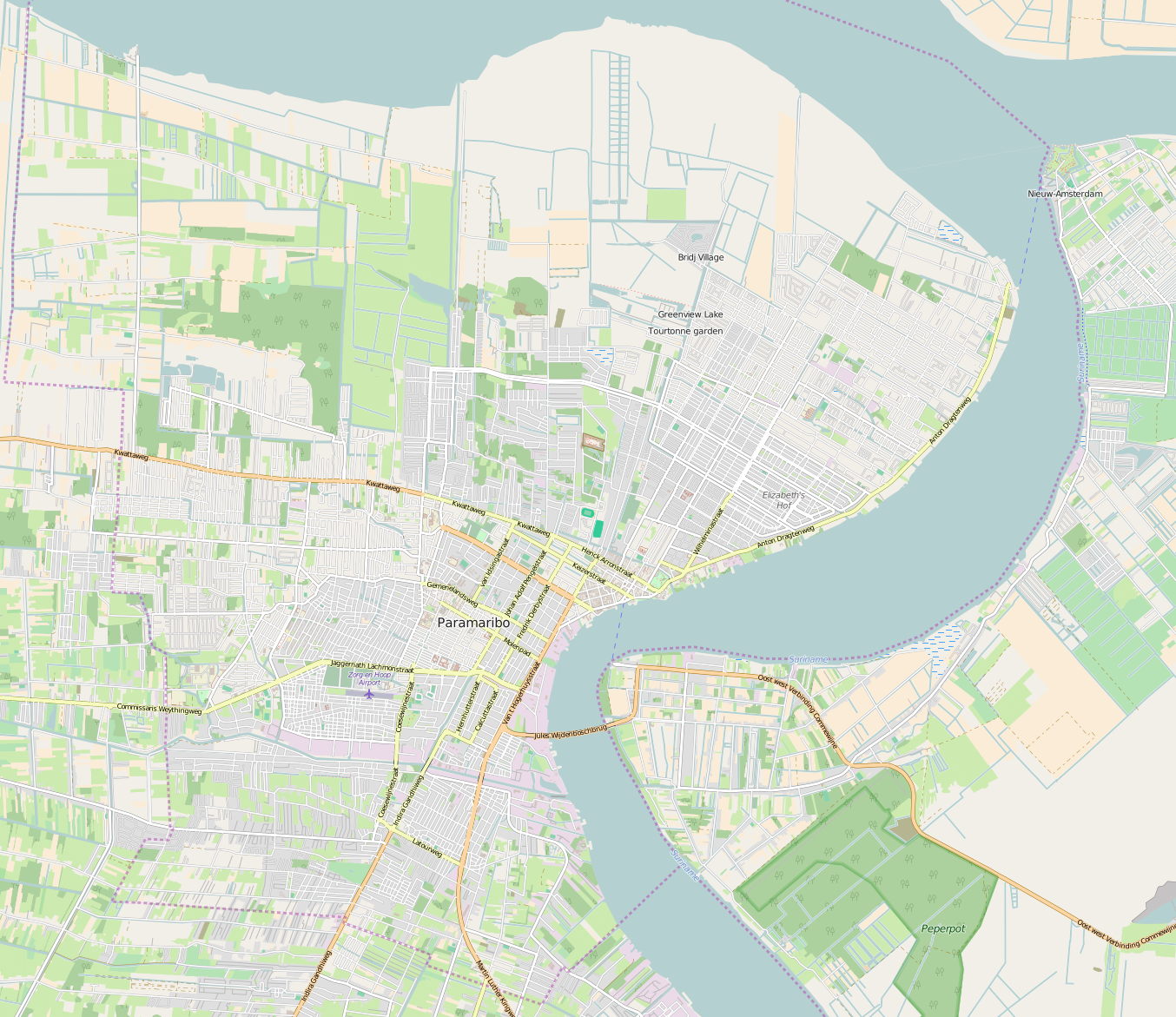
- Location within Paramaribo

General information
- Location: Paramaribo, Suriname
- Coordinates: 5.82334°N 55.15898°W
- Completed: 1969

Design and construction
- Architect: Peter Nagel

The Central Market is a marketplace on Waterkant in the centre of Paramaribo, Suriname. The building has two floors. The ground floor contains the food market where fruits, vegetables, meat and fish are sold. The top floor is a generic retail market where clothing, cigarettes, CDs and other consumer goods are sold. The market is located on the Suriname River, and is open Monday to Saturday.

== Overview ==
In July 1959, the city council decided to create a central, permanent market in the city which could accommodate 950 stalls. The design was difficult, because the Suriname River has a large tidal range and a strong currents. The market was constructed with European Union subsidies. Even though Suriname is known for its timber reserves, the wood used was imported from the EU. The roof has a double arch allowing plenty of ventilation inside the building. The building was completed in 1969.

The Central Market is one of the busiest part of the city. In the early morning, trucks and boats arrive supplying their goods to be sold at the market. The Central Market used to be known for illegal stalls outside the terrain, and the money changers which resulted in the nickname "Central Bank". In 2015, a renovation project started, and illegal stalls are no longer tolerated. During the COVID-19 pandemic the market was closed, and reopened in January 2021 with a one-way system with specific entrances, and exits.

== Bibliography ==
- Nagel-de Groot, M.W. (2005). Achteraf bekeken: Architectuur in Suriname 1951 tot 1969: Bouwwerken ontworpen door ir. P.J. Nagel (1921-1997) (in Dutch). ISBN 9090192808.
