= Dutch Reformed Church of Suriname =

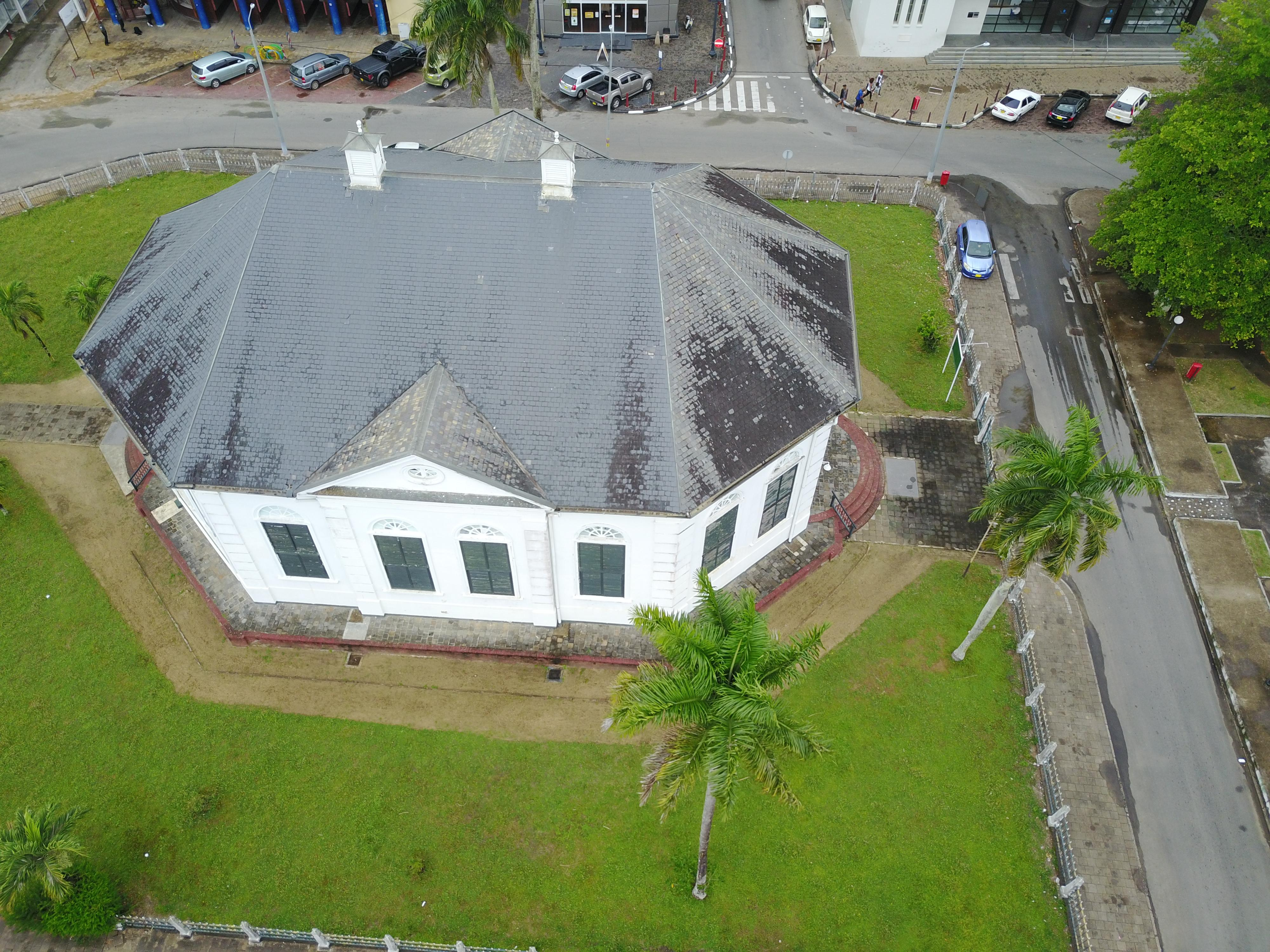
Centrumkerk in Paramaribo

The Dutch Reformed Church of Suriname was founded in 1667–1668 by Rev Basselieres. It was a church of Dutch colonists. There members used to be white settlers and freed slaves. Most church activities were in Paramaribo. Until 1850 the church was the state church. The church opened itself to the African slaves. The church has 15,000–12,000 members and three congregations and five house fellowships. The church subscribes the Apostles Creed, Heidelberg Catechism and the Canons of Dort. The church maintains a Seminary and a Bible Institute in Nugegoda, Suriname. The main church is the Centrumkerk on the Kerkplein. The church was founded in the 1740s, and the domed church was constructed in 1810. Characteristics of the church are the large tilting windows.
