= Berg en Dal, Suriname =

Berg en Dal
- Village
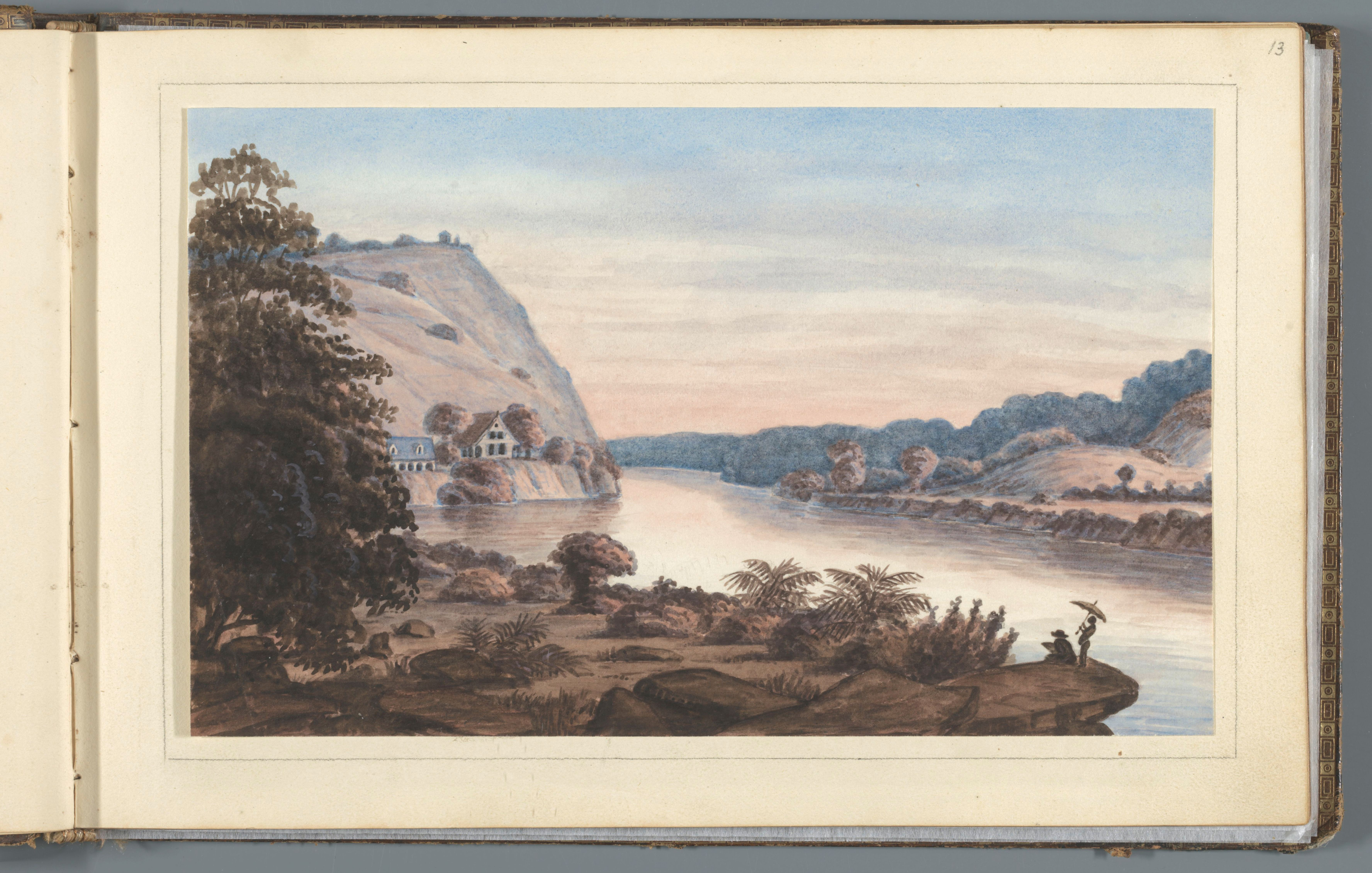
- Drawing of Berg en Dal (circa 1850)

- Location within Suriname
- Coordinates: 5.1392°N 55.0672°W
- Country: Suriname
- District: Brokopondo District
- Resort: Klaaskreek
- Time zone: UTC-3 (AST)

Berg en Dal is a village in the resort of Klaaskreek in the Brokopondo District of Suriname. The village is located on the Suriname River.

== History ==
In 1713, a military outpost was founded near Mount Parnassus which is nowadays called the Blauwe Berg. The outpost was meant to protect the colony against attacks of the Maroons (runaways slaves). In 1722, a sugar plantation was founded by Hendrik Temminck, the governor of Suriname at the time. In 1737, a wood plantation was founded, and named Berg en Dal. In 1762, a peace agreement was signed with the Saramaka, and the military post was disbanded.

In 1830, the Moravian Church embarked on missionary activities among the slaves, and founded the first church in 1839. After the abolition of slavery, the plantation suffered a period of decline, and in 1870, was sold by auction to the Moravian Church.

In 1968, the Avobakaweg to Paramaribo was constructed, which triggered a migration to the city. The Surinamese Interior War finally resulted in a near abandonment of the village; only one person remained in the village. In 1999, the Wederopbouw Berg en Dal foundation was established to revitalise the village. In 2003, the church collapsed. The Moravian Church started a joint venture with hotel Krasnapolsky in Paramaribo, and in 2008 the former plantation was transformed into the Berg en Dal Eco & Cultural Resort, a luxury holiday resort with 150 rooms for ecotourism.

== Notable people ==
- Johannes Helstone (1853–1927), composer, pianist and writer.
