= Sranan Tongo =

Creole language spoken in Suriname

- Sranantongo
- Sign in English and Suriname creole
- Native to: Suriname
- Region: South America
- Native speakers: L1: 520,000 (2018); L2: 150,000
- Language family: English Creole: Atlantic; Suriname; Sranan Tongo
- Writing system: Latin

Language codes
- ISO 639-2: srn
- ISO 639-3: srn
- Glottolog: sran1240
- Linguasphere: 52-ABB-aw

Sranan Tongo (Sranantongo, "Surinamese tongue"), also known as Taki-Taki or Surinamese Creole, is an English-based creole language from Suriname, in South America, where it is the first or second language for 519,600 Surinamese people. It is also spoken in the Netherlands, and across the Surinamese diaspora. It is considered both an unofficial national language and a lingua franca.

Sranan Tongo developed among Afro-Surinamese, enslaved Africans from Central and West Africa, especially along the Caribbean coastline, after contact with English planters and indentured workers from 1651–67. Its use expanded to the Dutch colonists, who took over the territory in 1667, and decided to maintain the local language as a lingua franca. Because the number of English colonists was massively reduced following the arrival of the Dutch, the later Dutch and African additions and influences to the language have made it distinct from other Afro-Caribbean creoles based on English. There are also influences from Portuguese present in the language.

== History ==
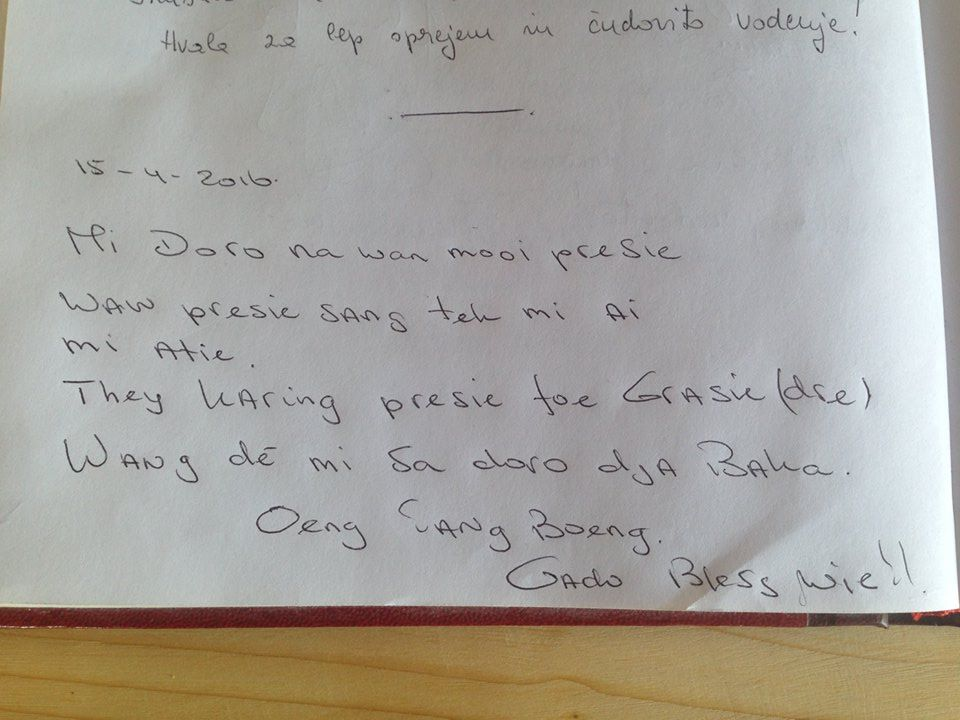
Message written in Sranan Tongo in a guestbook in the Land of Hayracks, an open-air museum in Slovenia (April 2016)

Sranan Tongo likely developed from an English-based pidgin, when English colonists in what was then part of the English colony of Guiana brought enslaved Africans for the plantations. The enslaved Africans, who were often from various tribes, did not have an African language in common and developed a pidgin to communicate. After the Dutch takeover in 1667, following the Treaty of Breda (1667) (in exchange for ceding the North American eastern seaboard colony of New Netherland to the English), a substantial overlay of words was adopted from the Dutch language, making it a secondary lexifier. There were also additions from Spanish and Portuguese—some of these dating from earlier Portuguese occupation of the colony, which preceded the arrival of the British.

The first enslaved Africans probably spoke Gbe or KiKongo languages as their native tongues, and were bilingual for some time. In the early 18th century (1720), large numbers of Akan people (65%) from the region then called the Gold Coast were also transported to plantations in Suriname. The addition of the Akan language into early Sranan Tongo, which had already undergone a process of creolisation at that time, further altered the language, causing relexification and giving the creole its own distinct form of Africanisms. As other ethnic groups, such as East Indians, Chinese and Javanese, were brought to Suriname as indentured workers, Sranan Tongo became a lingua franca.

Indigenous peoples in Suriname also intermarried with enslaved Africans, adding a significant amount of their cultural influence to Sranan and Afro-Surinamese culture.

== Characteristics ==
Despite having a significant number of English-language words in its lexicon, the lack of contact with English speakers from the 17th century means Sranan Tongo is seldom mutually intelligible with modern English and is distinct from most other English-based creoles. Some of the African language influences of Sranan Tongo are Gbe (Fon, Ewe, Aja, Gun, Gen (Mina), Xwelak), KiKongo, and Akan (Twi and Fante). The African influence on Sranan can be found in its grammar, morphology and phonology. Next to its idioms and idiophones in addition to its culinary, botanical, zoological, anatomical, artifactual, musical and ritual Winti lexicon. The influence of the Cariban languages, Carib and Arawak, can be found in Sranan's botanical, zoological, musical, culinary and Winti lexicon.

Remnants of Sranan's Portuguese-based period can still be traced in its lexical items of Portuguese origin and the Ancestral tradition of Odos. These are Afro-Surinamese people’s proverbs, folklore and stories, passed down generationally during slavery through oral tradition in Sranan. These stories are still a part of Afro-Surinamese culture and identity, with many that can be traced back to specific regions in Central and West Africa where they originated.

=== Phonology and orthography ===
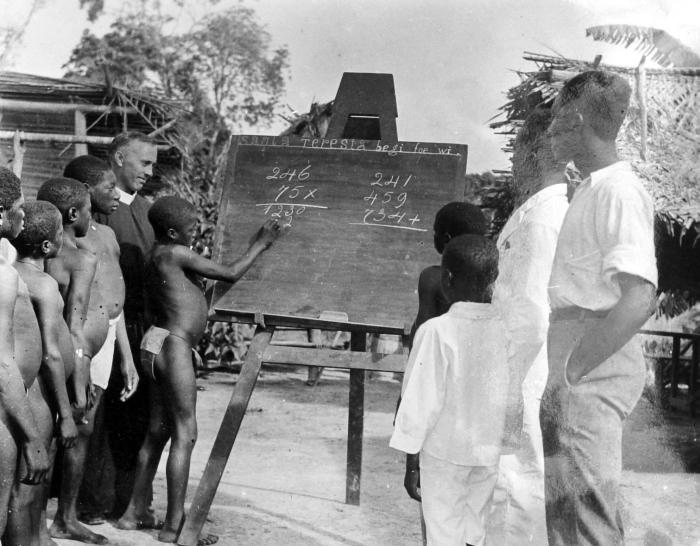
Maroons being taught in the outdoors, 1943. At the top of the blackboard is Santa Teresia begi foe wi, 'Saint Teresa, pray for us' in Sranan Tongo.

Until the middle of the 20th century, most written texts in Sranan, seen at the time as a low-prestige language, (Note: For example, school children could be punished for speaking Sranan Tongo.) used a spelling that was not standardised but based on Dutch orthography. In view of the considerable differences between the phonologies of Sranan and Dutch, this was not a satisfactory situation.

With the emergence of a movement striving for the emancipation of Sranan as a respectable language, the need for a phonology-based orthography was felt. A more suitable orthography developed as an informal consensus from the publications of linguists studying Sranan and related creoles. For everyday use, the Dutch-based spelling remained common, while some literary authors adopted (variants of) the linguistic spelling. To end this situation, the Surinamese government commissioned a committee of linguists and writers to define a standard spelling, which was adopted and came into force in 1986. This standard essentially followed the linguistic consensus. As the language is not taught in schools, while Dutch is, many speakers are not clearly aware of the principles on which this spelling is based and continue to use a Dutch-like, variant spelling.

== Modern use ==
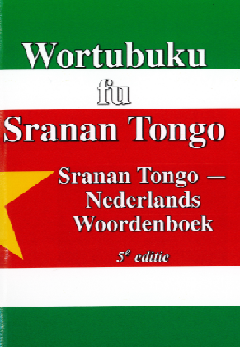
Cover of the Sranan Tongo - Dutch dictionary

Although the formal Dutch-based educational system repressed the use of Sranan Tongo, in the past pejoratively dismissed as Taki Taki (literally meaning 'talk talk' or 'say say') and Negerengels (literally meaning 'Negro-English'), it gradually became more accepted by the establishment and wider society to speak it. During the 1980s, this language was popularised by publicly known speakers, including former president Dési Bouterse, who often delivered national speeches in Sranan Tongo.

Sranan Tongo remains widely used in Suriname and in Dutch urban areas populated by immigrants from Suriname. They especially use it in casual conversation, often freely mixing it with Dutch. Written code-switching between Sranan Tongo and Dutch is also common in computer-mediated communication.

In 2021, Sranan Tongo appeared for the first time in the Eurovision Song Contest in Jeangu Macrooy's song, "Birth of a New Age".

== Literature ==
As a written language, Sranan Tongo has existed since the late 18th century. The first publication in Sranan Tongo was in 1783 by Hendrik Schouten who wrote a part Dutch, part Sranan Tongo poem, called Een huishoudelijke twist ('A Domestic Tiff'). The first important book was published in 1864 by Johannes King, and relates to his travels to Drietabbetje for the Moravian Church.

Early writers often used their own spelling system. An official orthography was adopted by the government of Suriname on July 15, 1986, in Resolution 4501. A few writers have used Sranan in their work, most notably the poet Henri Frans de Ziel ("Trefossa"), who also wrote God zij met ons Suriname, Suriname's national anthem, whose second verse is sung in Sranan Tongo.

Other notable writers in Sranan Tongo are Eugène Drenthe, André Pakosie, Celestine Raalte, Michaël Slory, and Bea Vianen.

== Example ==
Following are the Lord's Prayer in standard and Dutch-based spelling, followed by an English translation.

Standard spelling

Wi Tata na heimel,
yu nen mu de santa!
yu kondre mu kon!
yu wani mu go doro na
grontapu so leki na heimel!
Gi wi tide da nyanyan fu wi!
Gi wi pardon fu den ogri,
di wi du, so leki wi owktu de gi
pardon na den suma, disi du wi ogri!
No meki wi kon na ini tesi!
Ma puru wi na da ogriwan!
Bikasi ala kondre de fu yu èn ala tranga
nanga glori de fu yu, te teigo.
Amen.

Dutch-based spelling

Wi Tata na hemel,
joe nem moe de santa!
joe kondre moe kon!
joe wani moe go doro na
grontapoe so leeki na hemel!
Gi wi tiedee da njanjan foe wi!
Gi wi pardon foe den ogri,
di wi doe, so leeki wi ooktu de gi
pardon na den soema, disi doe wi ogri!
No meeki wi kon na ini tessie!
Ma poeroe wi na da ogriwan!
Biekasi ala kondre de foe joe en ala tranga
nanga glori de foe joe, te teego.
Amen.

English translation

Our Father in heaven,
hallowed be your name,
your kingdom come,
your will be done,
on earth as in heaven.
Give us today our daily bread.
Forgive us our sins
as we forgive those who sin against us.
Save us from the time of trial, and deliver us from evil.
For the kingdom, the power,
and the glory are yours, now and for ever.
Amen.

== See also ==
- Dutch-based creole languages
- English-based creole languages
- Guyanese Creole
- Matawai

== Sources ==
- Iwan Desiré Menke: Een grammatica van het Surinaams (Sranantongo), Munstergeleen : Menke, 1986, 1992 (Dutch book on grammar of Sranan Tongo)
- Jan Voorhoeve and Ursy M. Lichtveld: Creole Drum. An Anthology of Creole Literature in Suriname. New Haven: Yale University Press, 1975.
- C.F.A. Bruijning and J. Voorhoeve (editors): Encyclopedie van Suriname. Amsterdam: Uitgeverij Elsevier, 1977, pp. 573–574.
- Eithne B. Carlin and Jacques Arends (editors): Atlas of the Languages of Suriname. Leiden: KITLV Press, 2002.
- Michaël Ietswaart and Vinije Haabo: Sranantongo. Surinaams voor reizigers en thuisblijvers. Amsterdam: Mets & Schilt (several editions since 1999)
- J.C.M. Blanker and J. Dubbeldam: "Prisma Woordenboek Sranantongo". Utrecht: Uitgeverij Het Spectrum B.V., 2005, ISBN 90-274-1478-5, www.prismawoordenboeken.nl - A Sranantongo to Dutch and Dutch to Sranantongo dictionary.
- Henri J.M. Stephen: Sranan odo : adyersitori - spreekwoorden en gezegden uit Suriname. Amsterdam, Stephen, 2003, ISBN 90-800960-7-5 (collection of proverbs and expressions)
- Michiel van Kempen and Gerard Sonnemans: Een geschiedenis van de Surinaamse literatuur. Breda : De Geus, 2003, ISBN 90-445-0277-8 (Dutch history of Surinam literature)
