= List of Surinamese people =

Surinamese people or people of Surinamese descent who are famous or notable include:

== Art ==
=== Visual arts ===
- Leo Glans (1911–1980)
- Soeki Irodikromo (1945–2020)
- Stuart Robles de Medina (1930–2006)
- Gerrit Schouten (1779–1839)
- Erwin de Vries (1929–2018)

=== Film ===
- Borger Breeveld (born 1944)
- Kenneth Herdigein (born 1959)
- Pim de la Parra (born 1940)
- Jörgen Raymann (born 1966)
- Katja Schuurman (born 1975)
- Jimmy Smits (born 1955)

=== Music ===
- Afrojack (born 1987)
- Kenny B (born 1961)
- Humphrey Campbell (born 1958)
- Ramdew Chaitoe (1942–1994)
- Chuckie (born 1978)
- Damaru (born 1986)
- Sharon Doorson (born 1987)
- Anita Doth (born 1971)
- Benjamin Faya (born 1988/1989)
- Lieve Hugo (1934–1975)
- Ruth Jacott (born 1960)
- Denise Jannah (born 1956)
- Conchita Leeflang
- Jeangu Macrooy (born 1993)
- CB Milton (born 1968)
- Murth The Man-O-Script (born 1970)
- Max Nijman (1941–2016)
- Papa Touwtjie (1968–2005)
- Lodewijk Parisius (1911–1963)
- Raffaëla Paton (born 1983)
- Rochelle Perts (born 1992)
- Def Rhymz (born 1970)
- Natalie La Rose (born 1988)
- Sidney Samson (born 1981)
- Birgit Schuurman (born 1977)
- Milly Scott (born 1933)
- Tony Scott (born 1971)
- Eva Simons (born 1984)
- Ray Slijngaard (born 1971)
- Eddy Snijders (1923–1990)
- Ronald Snijders (born 1951)
- Sabrina Starke (born 1979)
- Remon Stotijn (born 1975)
- Max Woiski Jr. (1930–2011)
- Max Woiski Sr. (1911–1981)

=== Writing ===
- Clark Accord (1961–2011)
- Karin Amatmoekrim (born 1977)
- Bhai (1935–2018)
- Eugène Drenthe (1925–2009)
- Hans Faverey (1933–1990)
- Lou Lichtveld (1903–1996)
- Cynthia McLeod (born 1936)
- Pim de la Parra (1940–2024)
- Astrid Roemer (1947–2026)
- Ronald Snijders (born 1951)
- Henri Frans de Ziel (1916–1975)
- Rappa (born 1954)
- Jo-Ann Monsels (born 1990)

== Inventors ==
- Jan Ernst Matzeliger (1852–1889)

== Journalists ==
- Bram Behr (1951–1982)
- Prem Radhakishun (born 1962)
- Anil Ramdas (1958–2012)

== Military ==
- Dési Bouterse (born 1945)
- Abraham George Ellis (1846–1916)
- Yngwe Elstak (1927–2010)
- Wilfred Hawker (1955–1982)
- Fred Ormskerk (1923–1980)
- Hugo Rijhiner (1905–1991)

== Politics ==
- Ashwin Adhin (born 1980)
- Jules Ajodhia (born 1945)
- Alice Amafo (born 1977)
- Robert Ameerali (born 1961)
- Henck Arron (1936–2000)
- Evert Azimullah (born 1938)
- Bram Behr (1951–1982)
- Léon Bertrand (born 1951)
- Dési Bouterse (born 1945)
- Eddy Bruma (1925–2000)
- Ronnie Brunswijk (born 1962)
- Henk Chin A Sen (1934–1999)
- Archibald Currie (1888–1986)
- Fred Derby (1939–2001)
- Abraham George Ellis (1846–1916)
- Ivan Fernald (born 1955)
- Johan Ferrier (1910–2010)
- Kathleen Ferrier (born 1957)
- Lalinie Gopal
- Laetitia Griffith (born 1965)
- Roy Ho Ten Soeng (born 1945)
- Eddy Hoost (1934–1982)
- Otto Huiswoud (1893–1961)
- Tanja Jadnanansing (born 1967)
- André Kamperveen (1924–1982)
- Harry Kisoensingh (1954–2008)
- Anton de Kom (1898–1945)
- Johan Kraag (1913–1996)
- Jagernath Lachmon (1916–2001)
- Marie Levens (born 1950)
- Julius Caesar de Miranda (1906–1956)
- Fred Ramdat Misier (1926–2004)
- Felipe Enrique Neri, Baron de Bastrop (1759–1827)
- Johan Adolf Pengel (1916–1970)
- Pretaap Radhakishun (1934–2001)
- Patricia Remak (born 1965)
- Chan Santokhi (born 1959)
- Ram Sardjoe (born 1935)
- Ramsewak Shankar (born 1937)
- Jules Sedney (1922–2020)
- Jennifer Simons (born 1953)
- Sylvana Simons (born 1971)
- Willy Soemita (born 1936)
- Paul Somohardjo (born 1943)
- Joyce Sylvester (born 1965)
- Ronald Venetiaan (born 1936)
- Franc Weerwind (born 1964)
- Jules Wijdenbosch (born 1941)
- Renate Wouden (1949–2023)
- Armand Zunder (born 1946)

== Science ==
- Graman Quassi (1692–1787), botanist

== Sports ==
- Donegi Abena (born 1998), kickboxer
- Carolyn Adel (born 1978), swimmer
- Tommy Asinga (born 1968), athlete
- Ryan Babel (born 1986), football player
- Kiran Badloe (born 1994), windsurfer
- Gilbert Ballantine (born 1961), kickboxer
- Ashwin Balrak (born 1975), kickboxer
- Sigourney Bandjar (born 1984), football player
- Timothy Beck (born 1977), athlete, bobsledder
- Sheraldo Becker (born 1995), football player
- Diego Biseswar (born 1988), football player
- Alex Blanchard (born 1958), boxer
- Regi Blinker (born 1969), football player
- Kevin Bobson (born 1980), football player
- Winston Bogarde (born 1970), football player
- Remy Bonjasky (born 1976), kickboxer
- Edson Braafheid (born 1983), football player
- Jeffrey Bruma (born 1991), football player
- Lucien Carbin (born 1952), kickboxer
- Romeo Castelen (born 1983), football player
- Henk ten Cate (born 1954), football player
- Tjaronn Chery (born 1988), football player
- Nelli Cooman (born 1964), athlete
- Lloyd van Dams (born 1972), kickboxer
- Edgar Davids (born 1973), football player
- Lorenzo Davids (born 1986), football player
- Sergiño Dest (born 2000), football player
- Virgil van Dijk (born 1991), football player
- Mitchell Donald (born 1988), football player
- Ryan Donk (born 1986), football player
- Darl Douglas (born 1979), football player
- Giovanni Drenthe (born 1990), football player
- Royston Drenthe (born 1987), football player
- Regian Eersel (born 1992), kickboxer
- Eljero Elia (born 1987), football player
- Dex Elmont (born 1984), judoka
- Guillaume Elmont (born 1981), judoka
- Ilonka Elmont (born 1974), kickboxer
- Ricardo Elmont (1954–2013), judoka
- Kurt Elshot (born 1977), football player
- Francisco Elson (born 1976), basketball player
- Urby Emanuelson (born 1986), football player
- Orlando Engelaar (born 1979), football player
- Wim Esajas (born 1935), athlete
- Iwan Fränkel (born 1941), football player
- Henk Fraser (born 1966), football player
- Cerezo Fung a Wing (born 1983), football player
- Leroy George (born 1987), football player
- Rodney Glunder (born 1975), kickboxer
- Ulrich van Gobbel (born 1971), football player
- Jacqueline Goormachtigh (born 1970), athlete
- Dean Gorré (born 1970), football player
- Murthel Groenhart (born 1986), kickboxer
- Martha Grossenbacher (born 1959), athlete
- Ruud Gullit (born 1962), football player
- Warner Hahn (born 1992), football player
- Harald Hasselbach (born 1967), American football player
- Jimmy Floyd Hasselbaink (born 1972), football player
- Nigel Hasselbaink (born 1990), football player
- Ivan Hippolyte (born 1964), kickboxer
- Ernesto Hoost (born 1965), kickboxer
- Kew Jaliens (born 1978), football player
- Jerry de Jong (born 1964), football player
- Nigel de Jong (born 1984), football player
- Worthy de Jong (born 1988), basketball player
- Calvin Jong-a-Pin (born 1986), football player
- André Kamperveen (1924–1982), football player
- Ricardo Kishna (born 1995), football player
- Patrick Kluivert (born 1976), football player
- Ryan Koolwijk (born 1985), football player
- Ludwig Kotzebue (born 1946), karateka
- Ranomi Kromowidjojo (born 1990), swimmer
- Chico Kwasi (born 1998), kickboxer
- Kelvin Leerdam (born 1990), football player
- Jeremain Lens (born 1987), football player
- Frank Lobman (1953–2021), kickboxer
- Ismael Londt (born 1986), kickboxer
- Melvin Manhoef (born 1976), mixed martial artist and kickboxer
- Henny Meijer (born 1962), football player
- Mario Melchiot (born 1976), football player
- Stanley Menzo (born 1963), football player
- Humphrey Mijnals (1930–2019), football player
- Luciano Narsingh (born 1990), football player
- Anthony Nesty (born 1967), swimmer
- Remie Olmberg (born 1950), football player
- Jeremy Ormskerk (born 1982), basketball player
- Gerold Pawirodikromo, born c. 1958), athlete
- Damian Pinas (born 2002), mixed martial artist
- Marco Piqué (born 1980), kickboxer
- Joël Piroe (born 1999), football player
- Celeste Plak (born 1995), volleyball player
- Don Diego Poeder (born 1972), boxer
- Germaine de Randamie (born 1984), mixed martial artist and kickboxer
- John Reeberg (born 1947), karateka
- Michael Reiziger (born 1973), football player
- Frank Rijkaard (born 1962), football player
- Herman Rijkaard (born 1935), football player
- Lucia Rijker (born 1967), boxer
- Andy Ristie (born 1982), kickboxer
- Otti Roethof (born 1950), karateka
- Bryan Roy (born 1970), football player
- Jairzinho Rozenstruik (born 1988), mixed martial artist and kickboxer
- Urta Rozenstruik (born 1975), athlete, bobsledder
- Desi Samson (1919–2000), football player
- Jamile Samuel (born 1992), athlete
- Clifton Sandvliet (born 1977), football player
- Ruben Schaken (born 1982), football player
- Gregory Sedoc (born 1981), athlete
- Clarence Seedorf (born 1976), football player
- Regillio Simons (born 1973), football player
- Xavi Simons (born 2003), football player
- Rayen Simson (born 1972), kickboxer
- Andwelé Slory (born 1982), football player
- Evander Sno (born 1987), football player
- Virgil Soeroredjo (born 1985), badminton player
- Erwin Sparendam (born 1934), football player
- Tyrone Spong (born 1985), boxer and kickboxer
- Jurgen Themen (born 1985), sprinter
- Dwight Tiendalli (born 1985), football player
- Regilio Tuur (born 1967), boxer
- Etienne Vaessen (born 1995), football player
- Gerald Vanenburg (born 1964), football player
- Roy Vanenburg (born 1948), football player
- John Veldman (born 1968), football player
- Kenneth Vermeer (born 1986), football player
- Marciano Vink (born 1970), football player
- Michel Vorm (born 1983), football player
- Ginty Vrede (1985–2008), kickboxer
- Mitchell te Vrede (born 1991), football player
- Mark de Vries (born 1975), football player
- Letitia Vriesde (born 1964), athlete
- Boy Waterman (born 1984), football player
- Kevin Wattamaleo (born 1989), football player
- Lorenzo Wiebers (born 1986), football player
- Georginio Wijnaldum (born 1990), football player
- Enrico Wijngaarde (born 1974), football referee
- Jason Wilnis (born 1990), kickboxer
- Aron Winter (born 1967), football player
- Donovan Wisse (born 1997), kickboxer
- Mitchel Wongsodikromo (born 1985), badminton player
- Gilbert Yvel (born 1976), mixed martial artist
- Zachari Zeegelaar (born 1989), football referee
- Romeo Zondervan (born 1959), footballer
