= Jules Brand-Flu =

Surinamese artist and art teacher (born 1951)

- Born: 1951 (age 74–75); Paramaribo, Suriname
- Education: Nola Hatterman
- Known for: Painting, sculpting, drawing, leadlights and designing
- Website: https://julesbrand-flu.com/jules-brand-flu/

Juliaan Lodewijk (Jules) Brand-Flu, also written as Jules Brandflu, is a Surinamese artist and an art teacher.

== Biography ==
Brand-Flu started in 1971 as teacher for Nola Hatterman, when she established the Nieuwe School voor Beeldende Kunst (New School for Visual Art) at 71 years old. The other teachers then were Paul Woei en Rudi Getrouw. In 1975 he was the co-founder of the arstistscollective Njoen Sranan that was formed from teachers and students of the school, including Hatterman. Other members were Jozef Klas, Rinaldo Klas, Rudi Chang, Wilgo Elshot, George Ramdja en Doel Soekinta. A few months later Brand-Flu, Chang, Elshot and Soekina held a group exhibition which was opened by then president of Suriname Ronald Venetiaan,with among those present Prime minister Henck Arron. That year the artists there also designed the children's charity stamps of Suriname. In July 1977 he became the second secretary in the Bond van Beeldende Werkers.

In 1981 Brand-Flu designed for the Dutch PTT the Europazegels. In 1985 he and other Surinamese artists held an expedition in Curaçao.

One of his specialties is the making of artistic leadlights. For the Bisschopshuis Brand-Flu designed 6 windows, of which two on the theme of Petrus Donders in de Amazone. Bishop Karel Choennie said in an article: "the chapel in the Bisschopshuis can now rightfully be named a Peter Donders chapel." In addition, Suriname Alcohol Beverages (SAB) had placed one of his leadlights on the side of the street. Before SAB he also made a lightbox with the text "Black Cat Rum." As remembrance to the thirty-year existence of the company, the lightbox was unveiled on a tall pole in front of the company-owned building.

Brand-Flu is also a sculptor. In 2013 the bust of Jules Sedney he made was revealed that it had a place at the New Harbour, later renamed to Jules Sedney Harbour. A year later on the same square the bust of Hendrik Sylvester he made was revealed.

In the 21st century he is still active in the Examination Board of the Nola Hatterman Art Academy.

== See also ==
- List of Surinamese artists
