= Salikin Hardjo =

Javanese-Surinamese social activist (1910–1993

Salikin Mardi Hardjo
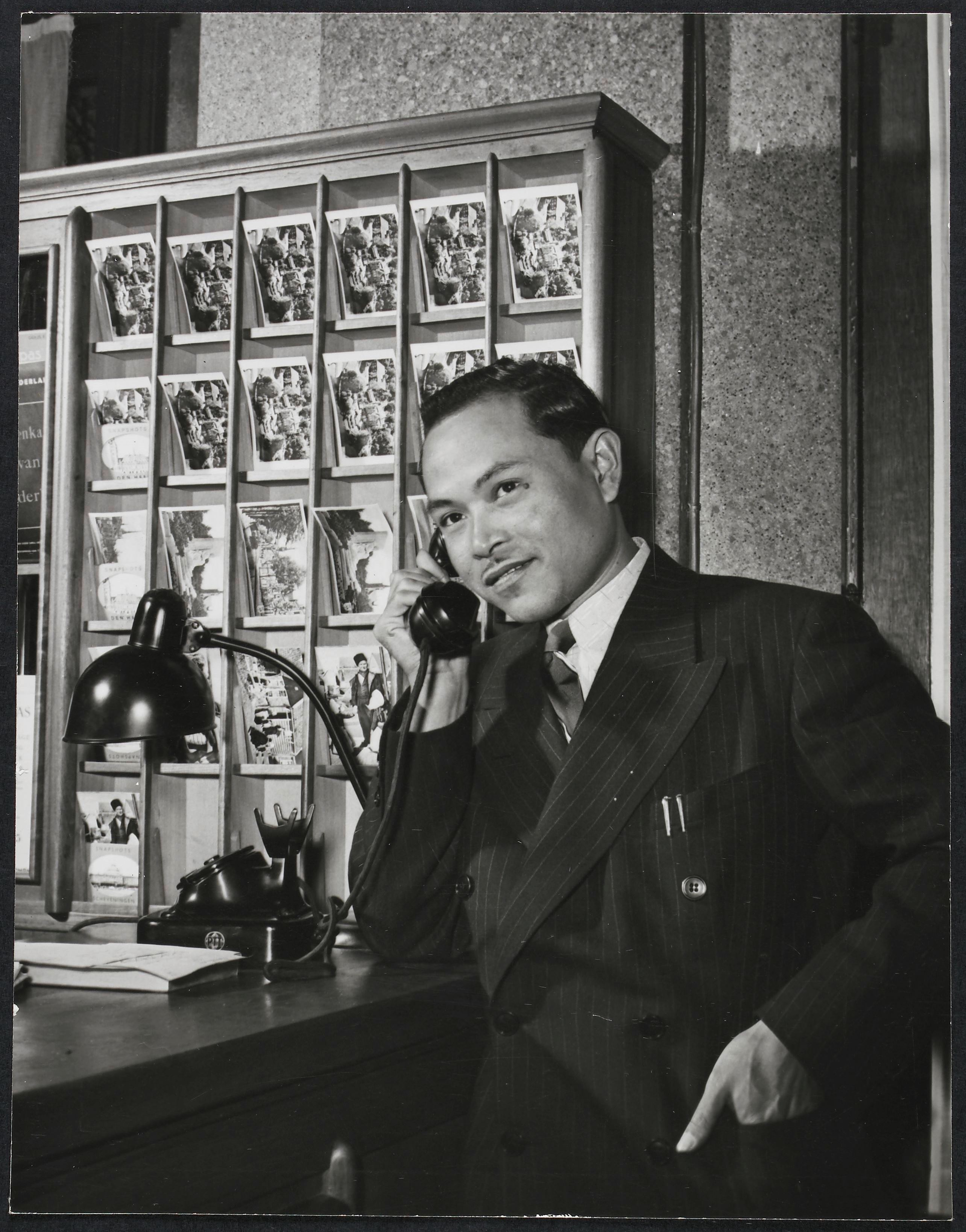
- Salikin M. Hardjo (1948)
- Born: 1910; Malang, East Java, Dutch East Indies
- Died: July 1993 (aged 82–83); Tongar, West Sumatra, Indonesia

Salikin Mardi Hardjo (1910 – July 1993) was a Javanese Surinamese social activist born in Malang, Jawa Timur (East Java), Indonesia. He is known for his opposition to Dutch colonial rule in Suriname in the 1930s, advocacy for the Javanese community in Suriname, and their perceived marginalisation and orchestrating the repatriation of many Javanese-Surinamese to Tongar in West Sumatra near Padang.

== Early life ==
Born in Malang in East Java. In 1920, he emigrated to Suriname which was a Dutch plantation colony at the time. His father, Doel worked as a mechanic in Moengo in the bauxite industry. In 1926, the family relocated to Paramaribo.

Klaas Breunissen, an author proved in 2001 that Hardjo secretly wrote under the pen name, ‘Bok Sark’ posing as a Javanese woman maltreated on a plantation in the Surinamese magazine De Banier van Waarheid en Recht’.

== Political career ==
He founded the Pergerakan Bangsa Indonesia Suriname (PBIS), in English the ‘People’s Party of Indonesians in Suriname’. The PBIS rivalled the Kaum Tani Persatuan Indonesia, (KTPI) (Indonesian Peasant’s Party) which is now the Party for National Unity and Solidarity. Hardjo and the PBIS eventually lost out to the more traditionalist KTPI, led by Iding Soemita.

In 1954 after, Suriname gained self-governance, all citizens of Suriname were granted Dutch citizenship. In response, the Government of Indonesia sent Abikusno Tjokrosujoso, a leading statesman and signatory to the constitution of Indonesia. It was determined that repatriation was popular. After his defeat by the KTPI and the success of Tjokrosujoso’s mission, Hardjo set up the Jajasan ke Tanah Air, (JTA) which translates as the 'Homeland Foundation' which existed to promote the repatriation of the Javanese. A further delegation subsidised by the Indonesian government was sent to Indonesia to discuss repatriation efforts, members of the delegation met with President of Indonesia, Sukarno, Mohammad Hatta, then Vice President of Indonesia and Prime Minister of Indonesia, Sutan Sjahrir. It was decided and promised that each repatriate household would receive 2.5 hectares of land and decided that due to overpopulation, this land would not be in Java but instead in Lampung, a site already used to transmigration.

Hardjo, migrated to Indonesia along with his family in 1953. He was followed by the RMS Langkoeas, which set sail on 4 January 1954 carrying 1014 people, some 646 of whom had been born in Suriname. ‘At the last minute’, the migrants were informed that they would be granted 1.5 hectares of land rather than the expected 2.5 and that they should establish their settlement in Tongar, sometimes referred to as Tongass in West Sumatra rather than Lampung.

Tongar was praised as ‘model village’ by Indonesian authorities, but this outlook was not shared by many immigrants who doubted the stability of the new Indonesian state after the Permesta rebellion. Many left Tongar to the village of Duri in Riau province to work for Caltex, Padang with "Portland Cement" and to Jakarta for general economic prosperity. The village also grew with the further settlement of Javanese transmigrants. Despite its setbacks, the ‘Surinamese village' was declared to be the most developed West Sumatran village in 1988.

Hardjo died in Tongar in July 1993.
