= National Consultation of Organizations from Suriname in the Netherlands =

Dutch organizations for Surinamese workers

The National Consultation of Organizations from Suriname in the Netherlands (Dutch: Landelijk Overleg van Surinaamse Organisaties in Nederland, LOSON) and the Organization of Workers and Employees of Suriname (Dutch: Surinaamse Arbeiders en Werkers Organisatie, SAWO) were organizations for the struggle and defense of Surinamese workers in the Netherlands during the 1970s and 1980s. The first organization, LOSON, was founded in 1973. SAWO became the successor of LOSON in 1985.

== Organization ==
All activists who worked in these organizations were volunteers with a serious political role in the Surinamese community. LOSON was thought up by progressive Surinamese students. During the first years of its existence, LOSON became one of the largest organizations of Surinamese workers in the Netherlands.

=== Objective ===
LOSON and SAWO were progressive and democratic organizations. These organizations were also anti-imperialist towards the American and Dutch business community in Suriname. Its members therefore supported the labor and popular movements in Suriname for the introduction of democracy, Suriname independence and social progress. The activities of LOSON and SAWO have spread over a wide field, including the development of Surinamese popular culture, work, education, housing and health.

=== Publications ===
From June 1987 to 1991, SAWO published Kon Na Wan!. The magazine only described news related to SAWO interests and actions. In 1989, SAWO also published a book about Anton de Kom, one of the forerunners of the communist and anti-colonist movements in Suriname.

'Mokro' and 'Mokro dekati' were periodicals of the Communist Party of Suriname. Members of LOSON and SAWO regularly contributed to the publication of these magazines, among other things, writing articles and conducting interviews. The first monthly edition of 'Mokro' was published in August 1979. The first edition of the daily edition of 'Mokro dekati' was published on February 27, 1980.

== History ==
In the period before the establishment of LOSON, there was a lot of unrest in Suriname. In 1969, a coalition of the VHP and the PNP came to power, preparing a future independence for Suriname. Many young Surinamese later left for the Netherlands to study or work there. The government and the citizens who stayed were very concerned about this brain drain. In addition, American and Dutch companies have invested in Surinamese industry, often with negative consequences for Surinamese workers.

The result of these developments was that there was a lot of poverty and corruption in Suriname. Tensions between the government and the rest of the country increased. In January 1973, customs officials in Suriname went on strike after failed negotiations with the Ministry of Finance over wage increases.

== Activities ==
LOSON activists made a documentary in 1982 about the living situation in urban pensions called 'Onderneming Onderdak'. At the same time, there were many vacancies at the Bijlmermeer. Empty apartments like Gliphoeve were taken over en masse by Surinamese house hunters. LOSON organized solidarity demonstrations and collaborated with the Amsterdam squatter movement to preserve the houses.
