= Javanese Surinamese =

Ethnic group of Javanese descent in Suriname

ꦮꦺꦴꦁꦗꦮꦯꦸꦫꦶꦤꦩꦺ Wong Jåwå Surinamè (in Javanese) Orang Jawa Suriname (in Indonesian) Javaanse Surinamers (in Dutch)
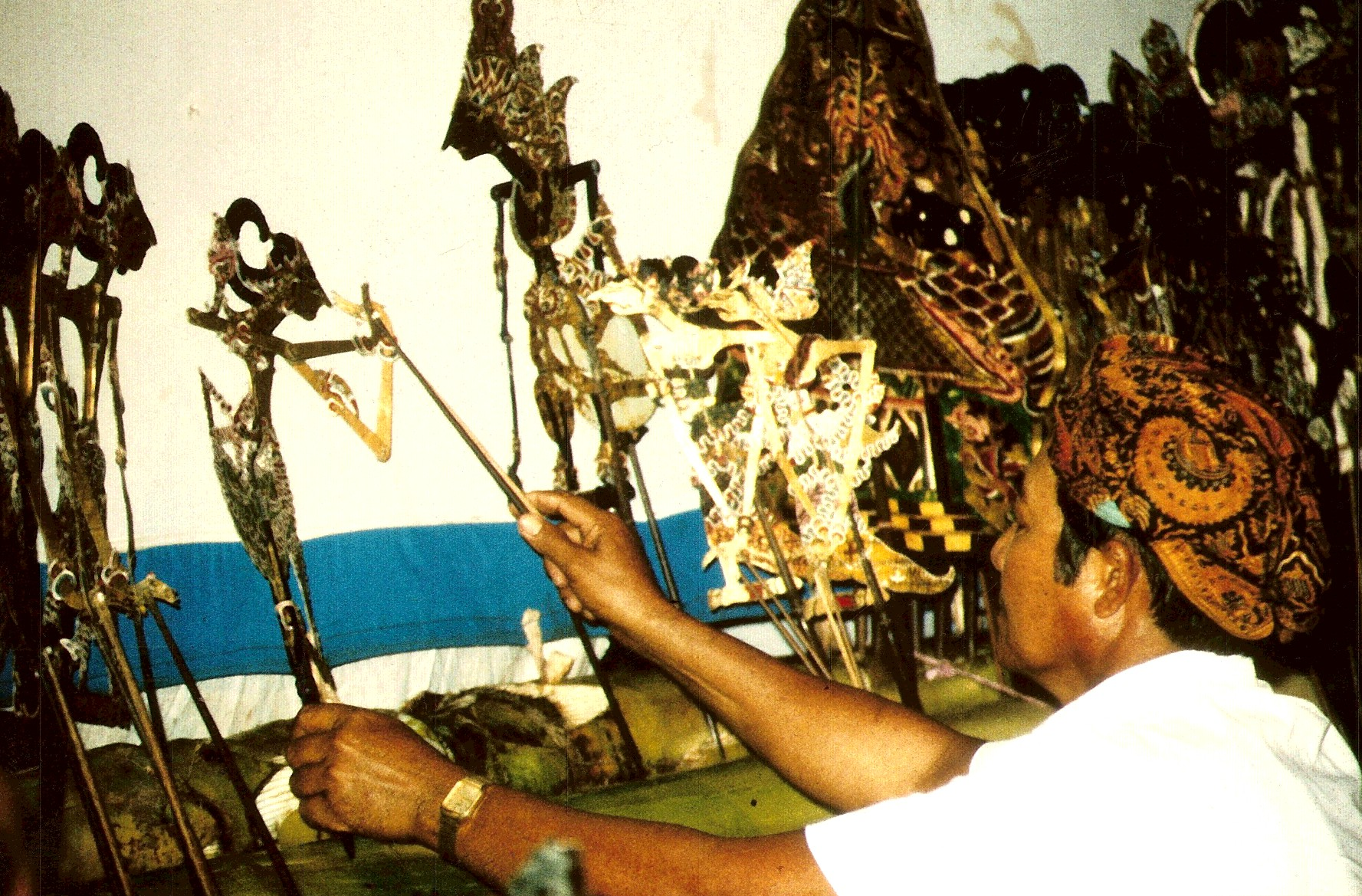
- Wayang Kulit played by Surinamese Javanese

Total population
- 82,000–90,000 (pure descent); up to 126,500 (including mixed ancestry)

Regions with significant populations
- Commewijne: 47% · Wanica: 18% · Paramaribo: 10%
- Suriname: 82,000–90,000 (pure descent), representing roughly 13% to 15% of the national population
- Netherlands: 21,700–25,000
- United States: 3,000
- French Guiana: 2,800

Languages
- Surinamese-Javanese (Tyoro Jowo-Suriname) · Dutch · Sranan Tongo, Indonesian, French

Religion
- Majority: Sunni Islam 64%–67% Minority: Christianity 14%–21%, Kejawèn 5.6%, Hinduism 1.2%

Related ethnic groups
- Javanese · Javanese French Guianans

Javanese Surinamese are an ethnic group of Javanese and by extension Indonesian descent in Suriname. They constitute roughly 13% to 15% of Suriname's population, making them the third-largest ethnic group in the highly pluralistic society. Their ancestors were primarily contract laborers transported from the Dutch East Indies to the Dutch Caribbean colony of Surinam between 1890 and 1939. Over the past century, they have forged a distinct cultural, political, and sociolinguistic identity, effectively creating a transnational identity anchored in Java, Suriname, and the Netherlands.

== History ==
=== The transition to Javanese labor ===
The arrival of the Javanese in Suriname is inextricably linked to the abolition of slavery in the Dutch Caribbean in 1863. Following a mandatory ten-year transition period for formerly enslaved Africans, the Dutch colonial administration faced an acute labor shortage on their plantations. The colonial government initially imported indentured laborers from British India. However, Indian migrants remained subjects of the British Crown, possessing legal safeguards that undermined the total subjugation required by the plantation system. Seeking a more submissive and directly controllable workforce, the Dutch colonial government turned to its own massive Asian colony: the Dutch East Indies.

In 1890, the influential Netherlands Trading Society, which owned the Mariënburg sugar plantation in Suriname, initiated a private experiment to assess the viability of Javanese labor. On May 21, 1890, the steamship SS Koningin Emma departed Batavia carrying 94 Javanese laborers, arriving in Paramaribo on August 9, 1890. The experiment was deemed a logistical and economic success by the planters, prompting the colonial government to officially take over the recruitment and transportation of Javanese labor by 1894.

=== Indenture and plantation hardships ===
Between 1890 and 1939, approximately 32,956 Javanese contract laborers were transported to Suriname across 34 to 77 separate maritime voyages. The recruitment primarily targeted impoverished peasants from rural regions in Central and East Java, as well as a smaller contingent of Sundanese individuals from West Java. Recruiters offered five-year contracts that promised steady wages, free housing, medical care, and the option of free repatriation upon contract completion.

The reality of the indenture system often starkly contradicted these colonial promises. Upon arrival, laborers were subjected to the penal sanction, a brutal legal mechanism that criminalized any breach of the labor contract, effectively reducing the workers to a state of debt peonage. They faced long hours, abysmal wages, substandard housing without basic sanitation, and routine corporal punishment. Furthermore, a profound homesickness referred to locally as the Mulih Njadawa syndrome devastated the population's morale. Despite contractual promises, accumulating debt and the prohibitive cost of independent travel resulted in 75% to 80% of the Javanese permanently remaining in Suriname after their contracts expired.

== Demographics and distribution ==
Following the eventual abolition of the indenture system in 1931, many Javanese transitioned from plantation laborers to independent smallholder agriculturalists. The colonial government provided former workers with small plots of crown land to establish traditional Javanese-style villages, such as Koewarasan, Sidoredjo, and Tamanredjo. In 1927, immigrants born in Suriname were officially granted Dutch nationality, solidifying their permanent status.

Today, the Javanese Surinamese population numbers between 82,000 and 90,000 individuals of pure descent, and up to 126,500 when including mixed ancestry. The community remains heavily concentrated in the northern coastal districts of Commewijne (47%) and Wanica (18%), with a significant portion urbanized into the capital city of Paramaribo (10%).

Religiously, the majority of the community (64% to 67%) identify as Sunni Muslims, reflecting Java's deep Islamic heritage. A significant minority (14% to 21%) converted to Christianity, while around 5.6% adhere strictly to Kejawen, a syncretic belief system synthesizing Islamic, Hindu-Buddhist, and animist Javanese traditions.

== Political mobilization ==
In post-war Suriname, political organization evolved along strict ethnic lines. The Javanese rapidly adapted to this consociational democracy. In 1948, Iding Soemita established the Indonesian Peasants Party (KTPI), which became the definitive voice of the traditional Javanese peasantry. The KTPI initiated a highly effective strategy of taking a balance position between the larger Creole-dominated and Hindustani-dominated political blocks, ensuring Javanese interests were represented in government coalitions.

As the community modernized, younger generations became dissatisfied with traditionalist leadership. This friction birthed splinter parties, including Pendawalima in 1977 and Pertjajah Luhur in 1998, founded by Paul Somohardjo, further diversifying the Javanese political voice. Women also claimed political space over time, highlighted by the historic 2000 election of Roekaya Kertokalio-Moertabat to Parliament and the cabinet appointment of A. Kartosemito.

== Language and sociolinguistic evolution ==
The geographic isolation of the Javanese community in Suriname generated a distinct linguistic phenomenon known as Surinamese Javanese, or Tyoro Jowo-Suriname. A century of separation from the Indonesian archipelago, coupled with intensive language contact with Dutch and Sranan Tongo, has resulted in significant morphological and phonological divergences from standard Indonesian Javanese.

The most profound sociolinguistic change is the erosion of complex Javanese speech levels. Because the indentured laborers were almost exclusively drawn from the peasant class, the social necessity for the high register (krama) vanished in the Caribbean. Today, Surinamese Javanese is predominantly based on the low register (ngoko), featuring a more egalitarian grammar that reflects the shared communal solidarity of plantation life. The language is spoken by roughly 10% of the national population, though younger generations exhibit signs of language attrition.

== Culture, religion, and traditions ==
=== The Qibla controversy ===
The displacement to South America triggered a profound theological crisis within the Muslim community, known as the Qibla controversy. In Java, Muslims pray facing west toward Mecca. Upon arriving in Suriname, the first generation continued to face west out of tradition. However, in the 1930s, it was realized that Suriname is located west of Mecca, meaning the correct prayer direction is actually east. This bifurcated the community into the East-Qibla people, representing Islamic reformism, and the West-Qibla people, representing traditionalism and Kejawen adherence.

=== Rituals and cuisine ===
The cornerstone of Javanese Surinamese social and religious life is the Slametan, a communal feast designed to invoke states of spiritual equanimity and safety. The community also preserves the Bersih Desa (village cleansing) ritual, which functions as a communal reaffirmation of unity in the Caribbean context. Wedding ceremonies continue to incorporate elaborate rituals inherited from the ancestral homeland, including specific animistic offerings placed strategically to appease local spirits.

Traditional performing arts have also been preserved and adapted. Lacking the bronze required to forge traditional instruments, the first generation cannibalized the industrial detritus of the plantations to create Surinamese-Javanese gamelan. The Jaran Kepang trance dance also remains popular.

Javanese Surinamese cuisine is a hybrid gastronomy characterized by the adaptation of traditional Indonesian recipes using local Caribbean ingredients. Saoto Soup, for example, is distinguished by garnishes like fried string potatoes and a spiced Madame Jeanette pepper soy sauce. Other localized transformations include Baka bana (fried plantain served with peanut sauce), as well as Bami and Nasi dishes.

== Diaspora and repatriation ==
=== The Tongar Settlement ===
The declaration of Indonesian independence awakened a potent sense of nationalism among the Surinamese Javanese, leading to the Mulih Njowo movement advocating for a mass return to Java. In 1954, approximately 300 families chartered a ship and departed for Indonesia. However, the Indonesian government did not permit them to settle in Java, directing them instead to the dense jungles of West Sumatra, where they established the village of Tongar. Despite severe economic and agricultural difficulties, the community successfully integrated with the local Minangkabau society.

=== The Netherlands ===
The geopolitical shock of Suriname's independence from the Netherlands in 1975 triggered a secondary wave of mass migration. Fearful of economic instability, roughly 20,000 to 25,000 Javanese Surinamese migrated to the Netherlands during the 1970s, settling in major urban centers such as Amsterdam, The Hague, and Rotterdam. This migration effectively created a third homeland for the diaspora. In the Netherlands, the community is highly integrated and proudly self-identifies with Suriname. The diaspora has produced prominent voices in Dutch literature, most notably Karin Amatmoekrim, whose works explore the intersectional identities of the Javanese Surinamese community.

== Notable people ==
- Karin Amatmoekrim, writer
- Reinier Asmoredjo, painter
- Maarten Atmodikoro, football player
- Andy Atmodimedjo, football player and manager
- Sigourney Bandjar, football player
- Dylan Darmohoetomo, badminton player
- Bruce Diporedjo, football player
- Salikin Hardjo, social activist and Indonesian repatriate
- Soeki Irodikromo, painter and ceramics artist
- Frits Karsowidjojo, politician
- Neraysho Kasanwirjo, football player
- Ranomi Kromowidjojo, swimmer
- Jeroen Lumu, football player
- Sri Dewi Martomamat, Miss Suriname in Miss Supranational 2019
- Soerjani Mingoen-Karijomenawi, politician
- Jaden Montnor, football player
- Vangelino Sastromedjo, football player
- Darren Sidoel, football player
- Iding Soemita, politician
- Willy Soemita, politician
- Virgil Soeroredjo, badminton player
- Paul Somohardjo, politician
- Jayden Turfkruier, football player
- Mitchel Wongsodikromo, badminton player
