= Bruce Diporedjo =

Surinamese footballer

Personal information
- Full name: Bruce Julianto Diporedjo
- Date of birth: 28 July 1993 (age 33)
- Place of birth: Paramaribo, Suriname
- Position: Midfielder

Team information
- Current team: SV Notch

Senior career*
Years	Team	Apps	(Gls)
2014–2015	Inter Moengotapoe		
2015–2019	Walking Boyz Company		
2019–?	Notch		

International career^{‡}
2012	Suriname u-20	6	(0)
2015–2018	Suriname	4	(0)
- * Club domestic league appearances and goals ‡ National team caps and goals as of 8 June 2015

Bruce Julianto Diporedjo (born 28 July 1993) is a Surinamese international footballer of Javanese descent who plays as a midfielder.
