= Lils Mackintosh =

Dutch singer (1955–2023)

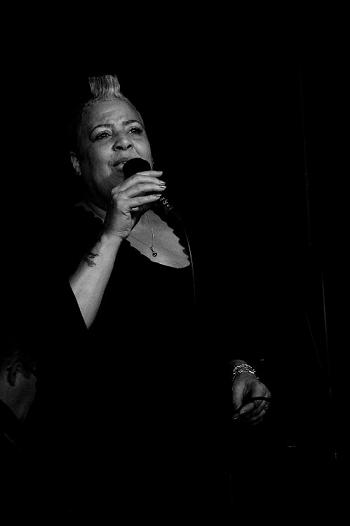
- Mackintosh in The Hague

Background information
- Born: Lillian; 11 June 1955; Amsterdam, Netherlands
- Died: 5 December 2023 (aged 68)
- Genres: Jazz; blues
- Occupation: Singer

Lils Mackintosh (11 June 1955 – 5 December 2023) was a jazz and blues singer and is considered one of the most distinguished artists in the Dutch jazz scene. Mackintosh had worked with the likes of Oscar Peterson, B.B. King, Scott Hamilton, Rita Reys, the Rosenberg Trio, Cor Bakker, Madeline Bell, Hans Dulfer, Candy Dulfer, Louis van Dijk, The Beets Brothers, Georgie Fame and the Dutch Swing College Band.

== Biography ==
Mackintosh was a Dutch singer, composer, actress and writer, born in Amsterdam, and the daughter of Surinamese singer Max Woiski, Jr. and granddaughter of musician Max Woiski, Sr. At seventeen she was talent scouted by the Dutch actor Jack Monkau and traded a formal education for a career in music.

=== The early years (1972–1990) ===
Being the daughter of two parents in the music industry, a career along that road seemed a natural step to take. Mackintosh became a professional singer with the acceptance of a role in the musical Hair. Next she played key roles in the Dutch rock opera Ik, Jan Cremer and the high-profile musical Barnum.

Mackintosh then decided to become more experienced as a lead singer and played in different rock and hard rock bands. She also toured on a regular basis. One of the highlights was an extended tour in Sudan, Kuwait and Egypt. This was also the period in her career where she had the honor to perform with jazz legends like Oscar Peterson and B.B. King. In 1977, Mackintosh released her first jazz single, a cover version of the Rodgers and Hart classic "My Funny Valentine".

=== Transition to jazz ===
Winning the 1990 'Vocalistenprijs' at the Dutch Jazzconcours in Breda led to a significant career change. Mackintosh then decided to specialize in jazz music. She started to perform extensively in Europe and the United States and was a regular performer at the legendary North Sea Jazz Festival.

In 1993 she released her debut album, It's not perfect to be easy. She received recognition for this album with the nomination for an Edison Jazz Award. Two more albums were released in this period: This is the strangest life I've ever known is released in 1994, followed by Seasons in 1997.

Being an artist with the desire to develop and transform, Mackintosh took a different take on her career when she formed the 'Lils Mackintosh & The Swing Cats' band in 1998. This period also marked the return to the theatre, with the Jazznight theatre tour, together with the Beets Brothers, the Stylus Horns and the Rosenberg Trio.

Her fourth studio album, Black girl, produced by the renowned saxophone player Hans Dulfer, is a tribute to the American blues singer and guitar player Huddie Ledbetter. The album was released in 1999 and made a big impression in the jazz scene. This, in turn, led to Mackintosh's first Edison Jazz Award.

Published on multi-channel SACD in 2002, Mackintosh's first live endeavor was a recording session at the Bimhuis in Amsterdam, in front of a live audience. The album, named In the wee small hours of the morning was well received by both critics and audiophiles.

That same year the Beets Brothers released the first-ever Dutch jazz DVD, featuring Mackintosh and Hans Dulfer.

A close collaboration with saxophone player Wouter Kiers led to the release of the concept album Comes love in 2005. All of the songs deal with different aspects of love and relationships. After a period of extensive touring in Europe, Mackintosh released the album About crazy. This 2008 album is an intimate portrait of an artist who has seen significant ups and downs in her personal life. Mackintosh also used the classic Hammond organ to create a distinctive moody and melancholic sound. The album coincidentally marked the start of her long-term collaboration with the Dutch saxophone player Clous van Mechelen.

The release of the 2010 album A fine romance is an audiophile's delight. This was actually a remastering of Mackintosh's debut album. In this version, extra care was taken in finding the right balance between voice and band to achieve the highest possible sound quality. The album is a classic demo disc for the demonstration of high-end audio systems.

=== Masterclasses ===
Mackintosh learned most of her craft by doing many performances, and had always had the desire to share her knowledge, experience and mostly her passion for singing. In 1995 Mackintosh started giving masterclasses and workshops, at jazz festivals and in theatres. In these master classes Mackintosh used her experience to help aspiring singers further develop their voices, to use the stage to their advantage, and above all, to emote. She later held monthly masterclasses in Amsterdam.

== Vocal type ==
"Few singers can do jazz with a raw and bluesy feel like Lils Mackintosh." – Angelique van Os, journalist, 2009.

Mackintosh is often compared to Billie Holiday, but that comparison is superficial at most. What these singers have in common is the capacity to immerse themselves into a song and sing it as if it were their own story. But other than that, Mackintosh's sound is very much her own. She had a multi octave range, but used two distinctly different voices to emote her music. Her lower voice is more bluesy in character and has a full warm sound, her high voice has a husky feel to it; it's melancholic with a little rough edge to boot. Mackintosh is instantly recognizable and her timing and phrasing are exemplary.

== Discography ==
=== Studio albums ===
- It's not perfect to be easy (1993)
- This is the strangest life I've ever known (1994)
- Seasons (1997)
- Black girl (1999)
- Comes love (2005)
- About crazy (2008)
- A fine romance (2010)
- 40 years on stage (2012)

=== Live album ===
- In the wee small hours of the morning (2002)

=== DVD ===
- Beets Brothers Live in Holland (DVD) feat. Hans Dulfer and Lils Mackintosh (2003)

=== Guest vocalist ===
- Beets Brothers – Live in Holland (CD) (2003)
- The Andrew Read Trio – Winter of my dreams (2004)
- The Dutch Swing College Band – A Happy Dixie Christmas (2005)
- The Dutch Swing College Band – When you're Smiling (2007)

== Publication ==
- Iedereen kan zingen, alleen niet allemaal even mooi (2007)

== Theatre ==
- Hair – Rock opera (1972)
- Tour in Soedan en Egypte met The Jeanet Dance Sensation (1978)
- Hard rose, knell blauw – Theatre production (1983)
- IK, Jan Cremer – Rock opera (1984)
- Barnum – Musical (1989)
- The Jazz Night – Theatre production (1998)
- Kook revue – with master chef Hoop Braakhekke (2000)
- LILS-SSST- talk show (2007)

== Awards and nominations ==
- Werftheaterprijs – Production of Hard rose, knal blauw (1983)
- Vocalistenprijs – Nederlands Jazzconcours Breda (1990)
- Edison Jazz Award Nomination – CD 'It's not perfect to be easy' (1993)
- Edison Jazz Award – CD 'Black girl' (2000)

== Additional sources ==
- Review CD 'About Crazy'– Angelique van Os, 2009
- Picture: Lils, photographed by Eric Dikkers 2009
