= Indonesians =

People of Indonesia

Orang Indonesia
- Flag of Indonesia

Total population
- Indonesia; 290,125,073 (mid-2026, Civil Registration); 270,203,917 (2020 census)
- Malaysia: c. 8,000,000–10,000,000 (of Indonesian ancestry; see Indonesian Malaysians); 543,514 (2025) (registered Indonesian workers) 1,322,351 (2024) (registered Indonesian citizens)
- Netherlands: c. 1,700,000 (2021) (of Indonesian ancestry; see Indo people); 362,685 (2022) (Indonesian-born/citizens)
- Saudi Arabia: c. 1,500,000 (2019) (of Indonesian ancestry; see Indonesian Saudis); 857,613 (2024) (Note: Indonesian citizen registered in KBRI (Embassy of Indonesia in Saudi Arabia)) (Indonesian citizens)
- Singapore: c. 500,000 (of Indonesian ancestry; assimilated into the Singaporean Malays); c. 250,000 (2022) (Indonesian citizens)
- Taiwan: 364.408 (June 2026)
- Japan: 307,456 (June 2026)
- South Africa: 300,000 (of Indonesian ancestry; assimilated into the Cape Malays)
- Hong Kong: 186.008 (2026)
- Cambodia: 166,795 (2025)
- United States: 145,031 (2022)
- Australia: 120,160 (2024)
- United Arab Emirates: 111,987 (2019)
- Suriname: 102,000 (2019); 673 (2021) (Indonesian citizens)
- South Korea: 86,421 (2026)
- Oman: 75,000 (2020)
- Germany: 54,500 (2025)
- Jordan: 46,586 (2019)
- Philippines: 43,871
- Sri Lanka: 40,148 (2014) (of Indonesian ancestry; assimilated into the Sri Lankan Malays)
- China: 38,000 (2020) (only Indonesian legal workers)
- Qatar: 37,669 (2019)
- Brunei: 35,000 (2025)
- Bahrain: 33,000
- Kuwait: 28,954 (2020)
- Canada: 21,390 (2016)
- Papua New Guinea: 14,000 (2020)
- Libya: 14,000 (2020)
- Syria: 12,904 (2019)
- United Kingdom: 11,000
- Vietnam: 8,000 (2020)
- Brazil: 7,911 (2025)
- New Zealand: 7,000
- France: 25,000–30,000 (2021)
- New Caledonia: 4,300
- Sweden: 3,000–5,000 (See: Overseas Acehnese)
- Italy: 4,000
- Switzerland: 4,000 (2020)
- Belgium: 4,000 (2020)
- Timor Leste: 4,000 (2020)
- French Guiana: 3,000
- Spain: 3,000 (2020)
- Egypt: 3,000 (2020)
- Turkey: 2,400 (2020)
- Norway: 2,000
- Lebanon: 2,000 (2020)
- Austria: 1,000 (2020)
- Hungary: 1,000 (2020)

Languages
- Indonesian; Regional; Javanese • Sundanese • Malay • Madurese • Minangkabau • 700+ other languages

Religion
- Majority; Islam 87.15% Minorities; Christianity 10.44% (Protestantism 7.37% and Roman Catholicism 3.07%) · Hinduism 1.66% · Buddhism, Confucianism, and indigenous beliefs 0.75% (2025)

Related ethnic groups
- Malaysians • Filipino • East Timorese • Papua New Guineans

Indonesians (Indonesian: Orang Indonesia) are citizens or people who are identified with the country of Indonesia, regardless of their ethnic or religious background. There are more than 600 ethnic groups in Indonesia, making it a multicultural archipelagic country with a diversity of languages, culture and religious beliefs. The population of Indonesia according to the 2020 national census was 270.2 million. 56% live on the island of Java, the world's most populous island. Around 95% of Indonesians are Native Indonesians (formerly grouped as "Pribumi"), primarily of Austronesian and Melanesian descent, with 40% Javanese and 15% Sundanese forming the majority, while the other 5% are Indonesians of foreign ancestry, such as Arab Indonesians, Chinese Indonesians, Indian Indonesians, and Indos.

== Population ==
As of 2020, Indonesians make up 3.4% of the world's total population and Indonesia is the fourth most populous country after India, China and the United States.

Despite a fairly effective family planning program that has been in place since the 1967, for the decade ending in 2020, Indonesia's population growth was 1.1 percent. At that rate, Indonesia's population is projected to surpass the present population of the United States and would - if the current US population did not rise – become the world's third biggest after China and India by 2043. The family planning already revitalised based on the 1967 program to avoid Indonesia becoming the world's third most populous country.

With a population of 151.6 million, Java is home to 56 per cent of the Indonesian population, and is the most populous island on Earth. The Indonesian capital city, Jakarta, is located on western Java. Much of Indonesian history took place on Java. It was the centre of powerful Hindu-Buddhist empires, the Islamic sultanates and the core of the colonial Dutch East Indies. Java was also the centre of the Indonesian struggle for independence during the 1930s and 1940s. Java dominates Indonesia politically, economically and culturally.

The other major islands of Indonesia are Sumatra, Kalimantan, Sulawesi and New Guinea, which are home to the other 49 percent of Indonesian population. There are also other small populated island(s) such as Bali, Bangka, Madura, Nias, Maluku, Lesser Sunda Islands, Riau Islands and others.

=== Ethnic groups ===
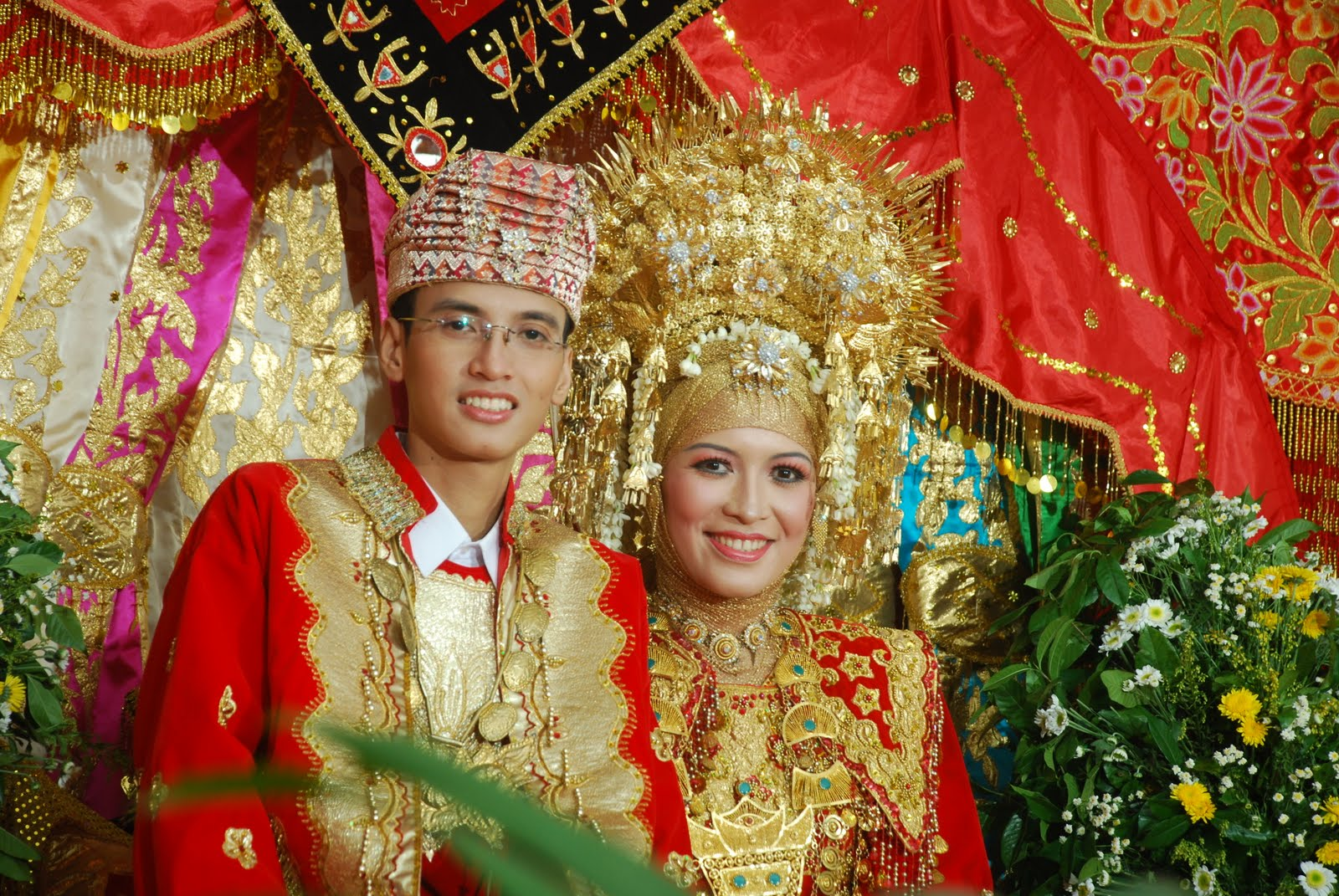
Minangkabau wedding

There are over 600 ethnic groups in Indonesia. This number makes Indonesia one of the most diverse countries in the world. 95% of those are of Native Indonesian ancestry.

The largest ethnic group in Indonesia is the Javanese who make up nearly 40% of the total population. The Javanese are concentrated on the island of Java but millions have migrated to other islands throughout the archipelago because of the transmigration program. The Sundanese people 15% of the population in Indonesia, are an ethnic group that shares territory with the Javanese in that, most of the Sundanese live in the western region of Java. Malays, Batak, Madurese, Betawi, and Minangkabau are the next largest groups in the country. Many ethnic groups, particularly in Kalimantan and Papua, have only hundreds of members. Most of the local languages belong to Austronesian language family, although a significant number, particularly in Maluku Islands and Western New Guinea belong to Papuan languages. The Chinese Indonesians (Tionghoa) population makes up a little less than 1% of the total Indonesian population according to the 2000 census. Some of these Indonesians of Chinese descent speak various Chinese languages, most notably Hokkien and Hakka.

The classification of ethnic groups in Indonesia is not rigid and in some cases unclear due to migrations, cultural and linguistic influences; for example, some may consider Osing people and Cirebonese to be members of Javanese people, however, some others argue that they are different ethnic groups altogether since they have their own distinct dialects. This is the same case with Baduy people that actually are sub-ethnic of the Sundanese people but sometimes considered as separated ethnicities. An example of hybrid ethnicity is the Betawi people, descended not only from marriages between different peoples in Indonesia but also with foreign origin like Arab, Chinese and Indian migrants since the era of colonial Batavia (Jakarta).

=== Language ===
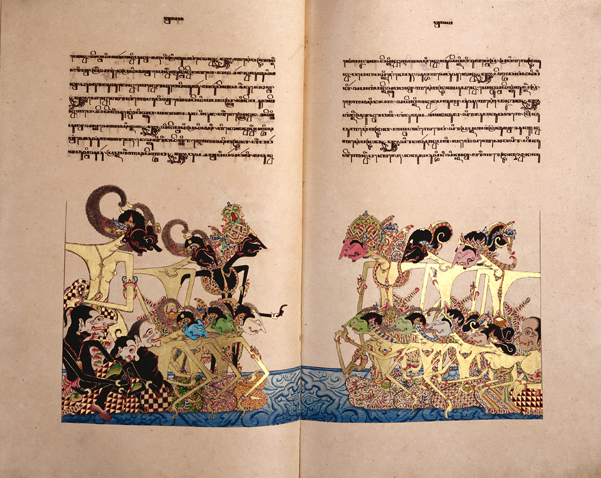
Example of Javanese script

Indonesian is the official language of Indonesia. It is a standardized variety of Malay, an Austronesian language that has been used as a lingua franca in the Indonesian archipelago for centuries. Most Indonesians also speak one of more than 700 indigenous languages.

Most Indonesians, aside from speaking the national language, are fluent in another regional language (examples include Javanese, Sundanese and others), which are commonly used at home and within the local community. Most formal education, and nearly all national media and other forms of communication, are conducted in Indonesian. In East Timor, which was an Indonesian province from 1975 to 1999, Indonesian is recognised by the constitution as one of the two working languages (the other being English), alongside the official languages of Tetum and Portuguese.

=== Literature ===
Indonesian literature can refer to literature produced in the Indonesian archipelago. It is also used to refer more broadly to literature produced in areas with common language roots based on the Malay language (of which Indonesian is one scion). This would extend the reach to the Maritime Southeast Asia, including Indonesia, but also other nations with a common language such as Malaysia and Brunei, as well as population within other nations such as the Malay people living in Singapore.

There are also works written in and about Indonesia in unrelated languages. There are several languages and several distinct but related literary traditions within the geographical boundaries of the modern nation of Indonesia. For example, the island of Java has its own Javanese pre-national cultural and literary history. There are also Sundanese, Balinese, and Batak or Madurese traditions. Indonesia also has a colonial history of Dutch, British and Japanese occupation, as well as a history of Islamic influence that brought its own texts, linguistic and literary influences. There is also an oral literature tradition in the area.

The term "Indonesian literature" is used in this article to refer to Indonesian as written in the nation of Indonesia, but also covers literature written in an earlier form of the Indonesian language i.e. Malay written in the Dutch East Indies.

=== Religion ===
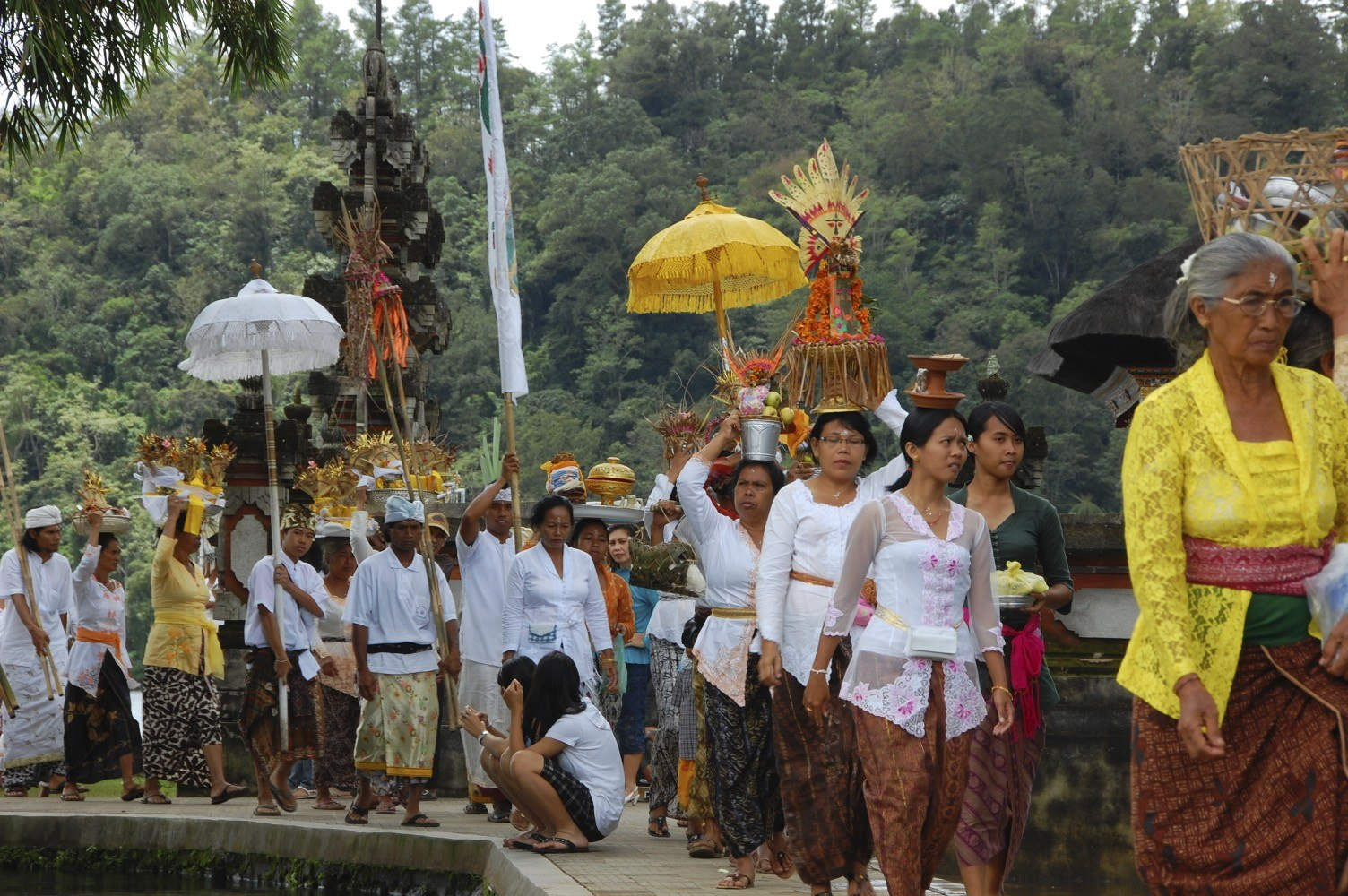
A procession with offerings entering a Hindu temple in Bali

Indonesia is constitutionally a secular state and the first principle of Indonesia's philosophical foundation, Pancasila, is "belief in the one and only God". A number of different religions are practised in the country, and their collective influence on the country's political, economic and cultural life is significant. The Indonesian Constitution guarantees freedom of religion. However, the government recognises only six official religions (Islam, Protestantism, Catholicism, Hinduism, Buddhism and Confucianism). Although based on data collected by the Indonesian Conference on Religion and Peace (ICRP), there are about 245 non-official religions in Indonesia. Indonesian law requires that every Indonesian citizen hold an identity card that identifies that person with one of these six religions, although citizens may fill in 'believer' on that section in case that person adhere to other religion than six recognized religion or leave that section blank. Indonesia does not recognise agnosticism or atheism, and blasphemy is illegal. Indonesia has the world's largest Muslim population In 2025, 87.15% of Indonesians identified themselves as Muslim (with Sunnis forming about 99%, Shias 1%, Ahmadis 0.2%), 7.37% Protestant, 3.07% Catholic, 1.66% Hindu, 0.75% Buddhist, Confucianism, and indigenous beliefs.

Indonesia's political leadership has played an important role in the relations between groups, both positively and negatively, promoting mutual respect by affirming Pancasila but also promoting a Transmigration Program, which has caused a number of conflicts in the eastern region of the country.

=== Cuisine ===
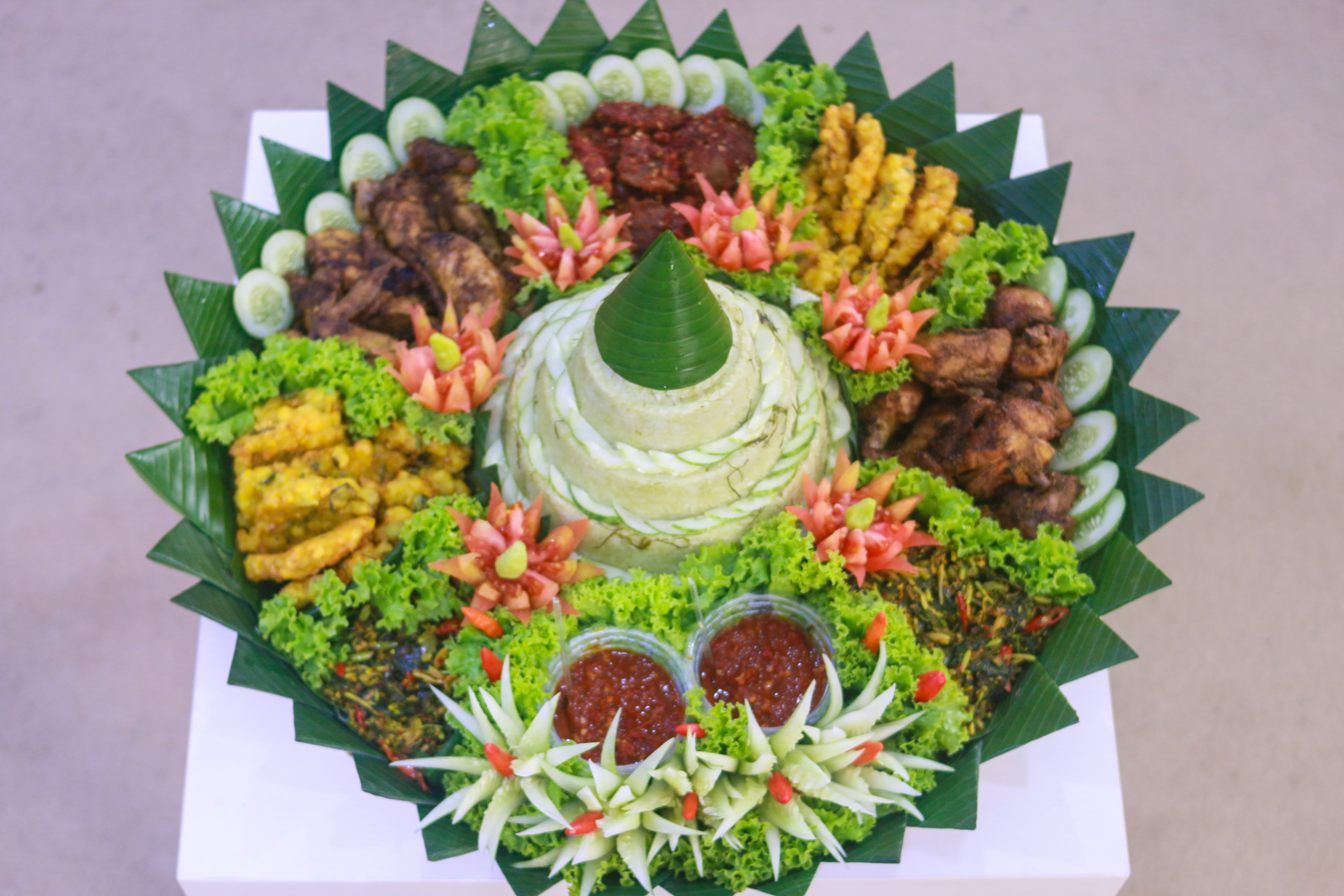
Tumpeng rice, the national dish of Indonesia.

Indonesian cuisine is one of the most vibrant and colourful cuisines in the world, full of intense flavour. It is diverse, in part because Indonesia is composed of approximately 6,000 populated islands of the total 17,000 in the world's largest archipelago, with more than 1,300 ethnic groups. Many regional cuisines exist, often based upon indigenous culture and foreign influences. Indonesia has around 5,350 traditional recipes, with 30 of them considered the most important.

Indonesian cuisine varies greatly by region and has many different influences. Sumatran cuisine, for example, often has Middle Eastern and Indian influences, featuring curried meat and vegetables such as gulai and kari, while Javanese cuisine or Sundanese cuisine is mostly indigenous, with some hint of Chinese influence. The cuisines of Eastern Indonesia are similar to Polynesian and Melanesian cuisine. Elements of Chinese cuisine can be seen in Indonesian cuisine: foods such as bakmi (noodles), bakso (meat or fish balls), and lumpia (spring rolls) have been completely assimilated.

=== Architecture ===
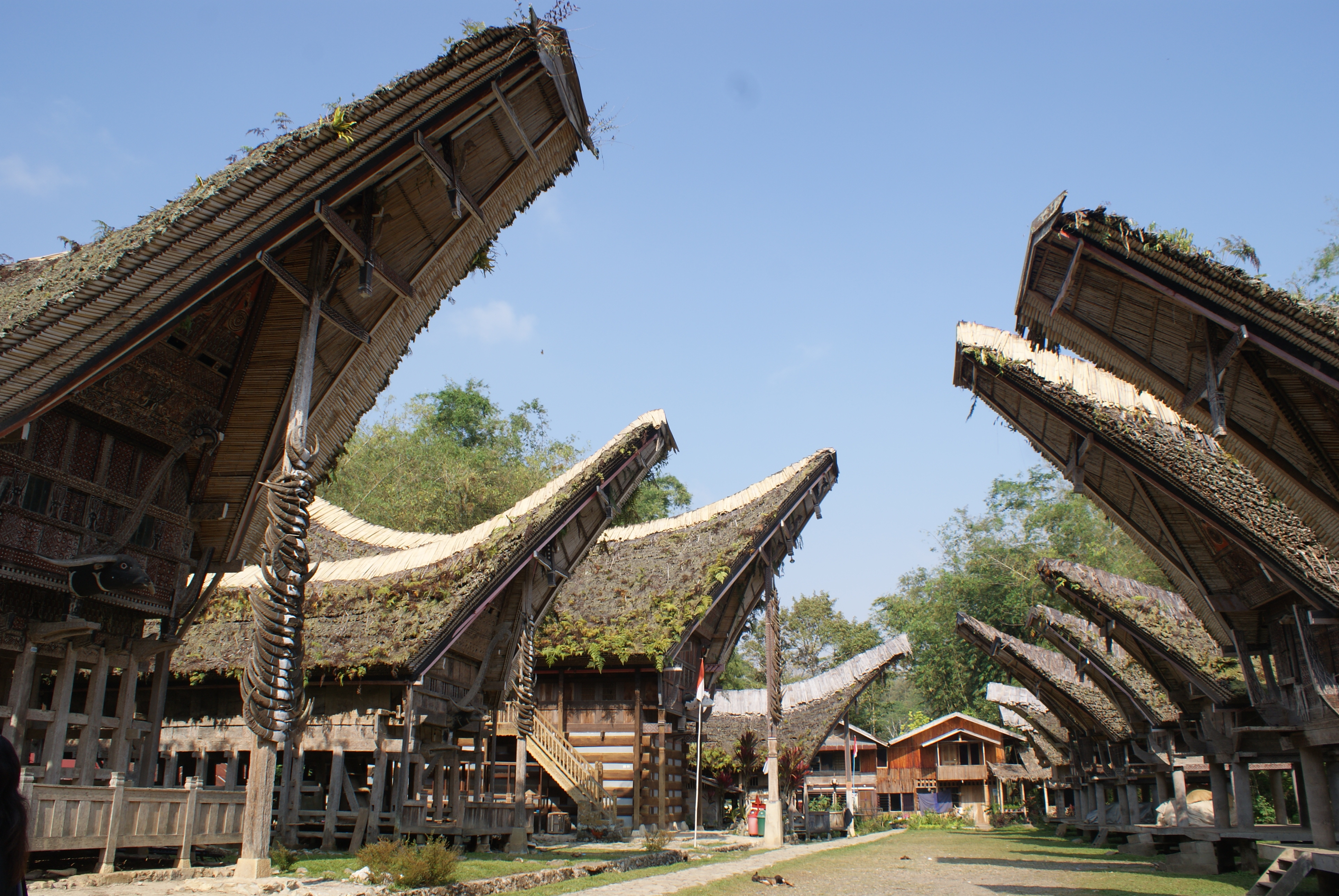
Tongkonan, Torajan traditional house

Indonesian architecture reflects the diversity of cultural, historical and geographic influences that have shaped Indonesia as a whole. Invaders, colonizers, missionaries, merchants and traders brought cultural changes that had a profound effect on building styles and techniques.

Traditionally, the most significant foreign influence has been Indian. However, Chinese, Arab, and European influences have also played significant roles in shaping Indonesian architecture. Religious architecture varies from indigenous forms to mosques, temples, and churches. The sultans and other rulers built palaces. There is a substantial legacy of colonial architecture in Indonesian cities. Independent Indonesia has seen the development of new paradigms for postmodern and contemporary architecture.

== See also ==
- Native Indonesians
- Ethnic groups in Indonesia
- Overseas Indonesians
- List of Indonesian people
