= Paul Bhagwandas =

- Born: 30 November 1950; Suriname
- Died: 19 July 1996 (aged 45); Paramaribo, Suriname
- Education: Royal Military School
- Occupations: Military officer, Football manager

Paul Bhagwandas (30 November 1950 – 9 July 1996) was a Suriname battalion commander. He was one of the sergeants who participated in a military coup in Suriname on 25 February 1980 (during the period of the military command of Suriname between 1980 and 1987). Bhagwandas was the third man in the military dictatorship after Dési Bouterse and Roy Horb and was known as "the executioner of Fort Zeelandia".

== Life ==
Like Dési Bouterse, Bhagwandas was educated in the Netherlands where he rose to sergeant and was trained at the Royal Military School in Weert. He then went to work in the Dutch military. After the independence of Suriname in 1975, he returned with a number of other Surinamese soldiers to work for the new Surinamese Armed Forces (Dutch: Surinaamse Krijgsmacht) (SKM).

== Coup d'état ==
Along with fifteen others, Bhagwandas took part in a coup d'état (the Sergeants' Coup) in Suriname on 25 February 1980. Discontent had increased among the general public, so Bhagwandas suggested taking action stating, at a meeting of the military in early December, that it was necessary to do something drastic to save the "revolution". Over the following days it was decided to arrest a number of opponents of the military dictatorship. Bhagwandas was in charge of the arrests and the internment of these individuals in Fort Zeelandia.

== December murders ==
The December Murders of fifteen objectors to the new regime took place over the period between 7–9 December 1982. Reportedly after the arrests, Bouterse went to his office and gave Bhagwandas the order to bring him the captives one by one. Bhagwandas was reported to have been present when Bouterse made the decision to execute each of the captives and was himself involved in the execution of at least two of the hostages who were then carried out by Bouterse. When Bouterse suggested that one of the hostages be spared, (trade unionist Fred Derby), it was Bhagwandas who disagreed, stating that they should all be killed. He was also present at the remaining executions which took place on the inner courtyard of the barracks.

== Football coach ==
Bhagwandas left the military in the mid-eighties and became involved with the Surinamese Football Association (Dutch: Surinaamse Voetbal Bond) (SVB). The André Kamperveen Stadion, named after André Kamperveen, a prominent Surinamese football player, sports administrator, politician and businessman, murdered in the December murders, is where Bhagwandas took the position of coach of the Suriname national football team in 1989.

In 1993, Voetbal International published an article about the Surinamese football coach. Henri Does of the Surinamese organization SAWO wrote the following:

"André Kamperveen is op 8 december 1982 op een schandelijke wijze gefolterd en om het leven gebracht. Nu heb je dus de vervreemdende situatie dat Bhagwandas aan de touwtjes trekt in het André Kamperveenstadion, als bondscoach internationale uitstraling heeft, terwijl hij één van de hoofdverdachten is van de Decembermoorden. Dat is een enorme morele verloedering."

— Does, 1993

Translation:

"André Kamperveen was shamefully tortured and killed on 8 December 1982. Now you have the alienating situation where Bhagwandas is pulling the strings in the André Kamperveen Stadium, as coach he has international appeal, while he is one of the main suspects in the December Murders. That is a huge moral degeneration."

— Does, 1993

== Declaration and death ==
Henri Behr, brother of murdered journalist Bram Behr, visited Bhagwandas in his house shortly before he died in 1996, and Bhagwandas admitted to having been involved in the murder of his brother. According to Behr, Bhagwandas stated that Bouterse himself was present, and that he had murdered Surendre Rambocus and Cyrill Daal. Behr secretly recorded part of the conversation, and turned the tape over to the (now deceased) chairman of the Surinamese human rights organization OGV (Organisatie voor Gerechtigheid en Vrede - Organization for Justice and Peace). The tape has since been lost.

Bhagwandas died of cancer in 1996.
