= Javanese French Guianans =

Ethnic group

Guyane française javanaise ꦎꦫꦁꦗꦮꦓꦸꦲꦶꦤꦺꦲꦦꦺꦫꦤ꧀ꦕꦶꦱ꧀

Languages
- Caribbean Javanese · French · French Guianese Creole · Indonesian

Religion
- Sunni Islam, Christianity

Related ethnic groups
- Javanese · Javanese Surinamese

Javanese French Guianans (French: Javanais de Guyane Française; Javanese: ꦎꦫꦁꦗꦮꦓꦸꦲꦶꦤꦺꦲꦦꦺꦫꦤ꧀ꦕꦶꦱ꧀) are a French Guianan ethnic group who are of full or partial Javanese Indonesian descent. There are approximately 3,000 Javanese French Guianans living in French Guiana.

Javanese French Guianans speak Caribbean Javanese and Indonesian.

== See also ==
- Javanese people
