= Max Woiski Jr. =

Surinamese singer and guitarist (1930–2011)

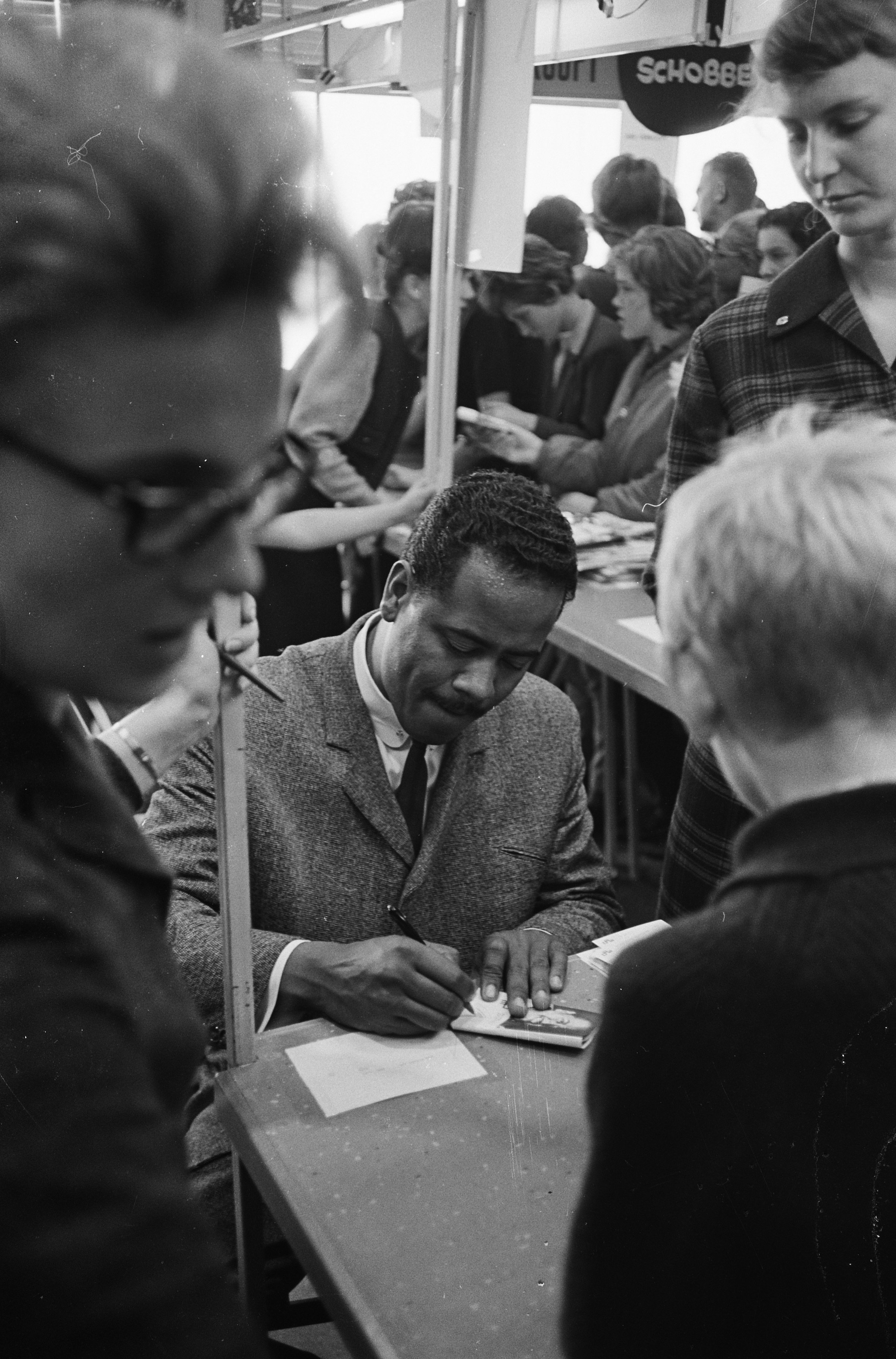
- Max Woiski Jr. in Rotterdam, 1963

Background information
- Born: Max Rene Valentino Mackintosh; May 13, 1930; Paramaribo, Suriname
- Died: March 23, 2011 (aged 80) Alkmaar, Netherlands
- Genres: Jazz, Latin
- Occupations: Singer, guitarist

Max Rene Valentino Mackintosh (May 13, 1930 – March 23, 2011), better known by his stage name Max Woiski Jr., was a Surinamese singer and guitarist. He was the son of Max Woiski Sr. and father of singer Lils Mackintosh.

== Career ==
Woiski Jr. was brought to Amsterdam by his father, when he needed a guitarist in his orchestra. When his father left to Mallorca to open a club there, he went his own way. Woiski Jr. mainly performed with his orchestra in his own club La Tropicana in Amsterdam. They mainly made Latin American music. He went on to have hits with the songs Rijst met kouseband (Rice with beans) in 1962 and Je bent nog niet gelukkig met een mooie vrouw (You are not happy yet with a beautiful woman) in 1963, which was a cover of If You Wanna Be Happy. Around this time he was very successful in the Netherlands and won an Edison Award. After a business conflict, four members left his band and founded their own.

== Discography ==
Albums

- Woiski A Go Go
- Max Woiski Junior at the Tropicana, Amsterdam
- De Grootste Successen Van Max Woiski Jr. (1970)
- Ritmo Tropical (2011)
