= Bram Behr =

Surinamese journalist (1951–1982)

- Born: Abraham Maurits Behr; 18 January 1951; Curaçao
- Died: 8 December 1982 (aged 31); Paramaribo, Suriname
- Occupation(s): Journalist, politician

Abraham Maurits Behr (18 January 1951 – 8 December 1982) was a Surinamese journalist. He published the pamphlet De Rode Surinamer and edited the weekly newspaper Mokro. He also founded (24 June 1973) and led the Hoxhaist Communist Party of Suriname (KPS), and was in opposition to the military dictatorship of Dési Bouterse. Behr was assassinated along with 14 other prominent Bouterse opponents on 8 December 1982, in an incident known as the December murders.

== Biography ==
In his youth, he was a violinist in the philharmonic society, then worked as a teacher of mathematics. He trained illiterates, organized strikes and protest actions of workers who demanded better working conditions.

Behr was a well-known journalist and publicist in the country. He was the editor of the newspaper Mokro. Since 1970, he edited the anti-capitalist magazine De Rode Surinamer ("The Red Surinamese"), which opposed the "colonial imperialism" of the United States. In addition to journalism, he wrote books. On 24 June 1973, he became one of the founders of the Communist Party of Suriname.

Behr initially supported the military coup committed on 25 February 1980, but then became one of the leading opponents to the regime of Dési Bouterse. He was repeatedly arrested.

On 7 April 1982, he was arrested for writing a book about the atrocities committed by the military. On 8 December 1982, along with 14 other opponents, he was assassinated by the military in Fort Zeelandia. He was buried in the cemetery "Annette's hof" in Paramaribo on 13 December 1982.

In 1996, the brother of Bram, Henri Behr, had a conversation with Paul Bhagwandas, one of the soldiers who participated in the military coup, shortly before his death. Bhagwandas acknowledged to Henri Behr that he had personally been involved in the murder of his brother. He stated that Bouterse ordered all murders and that he would have participated in two of them. Henri Behr recorded a part of the conversation on a tape, which, however, was lost after he had handed it to a human rights organization.
