= Eddy Snijders =

Surinamese composer and flute player (1923–1990)

- Born: Richenel Edgar Snijders; May 12, 1923
- Origin: Suriname
- Died: January 19, 1990 (aged 66)
- Occupations: Composer, conductor
- Instrument: Flute

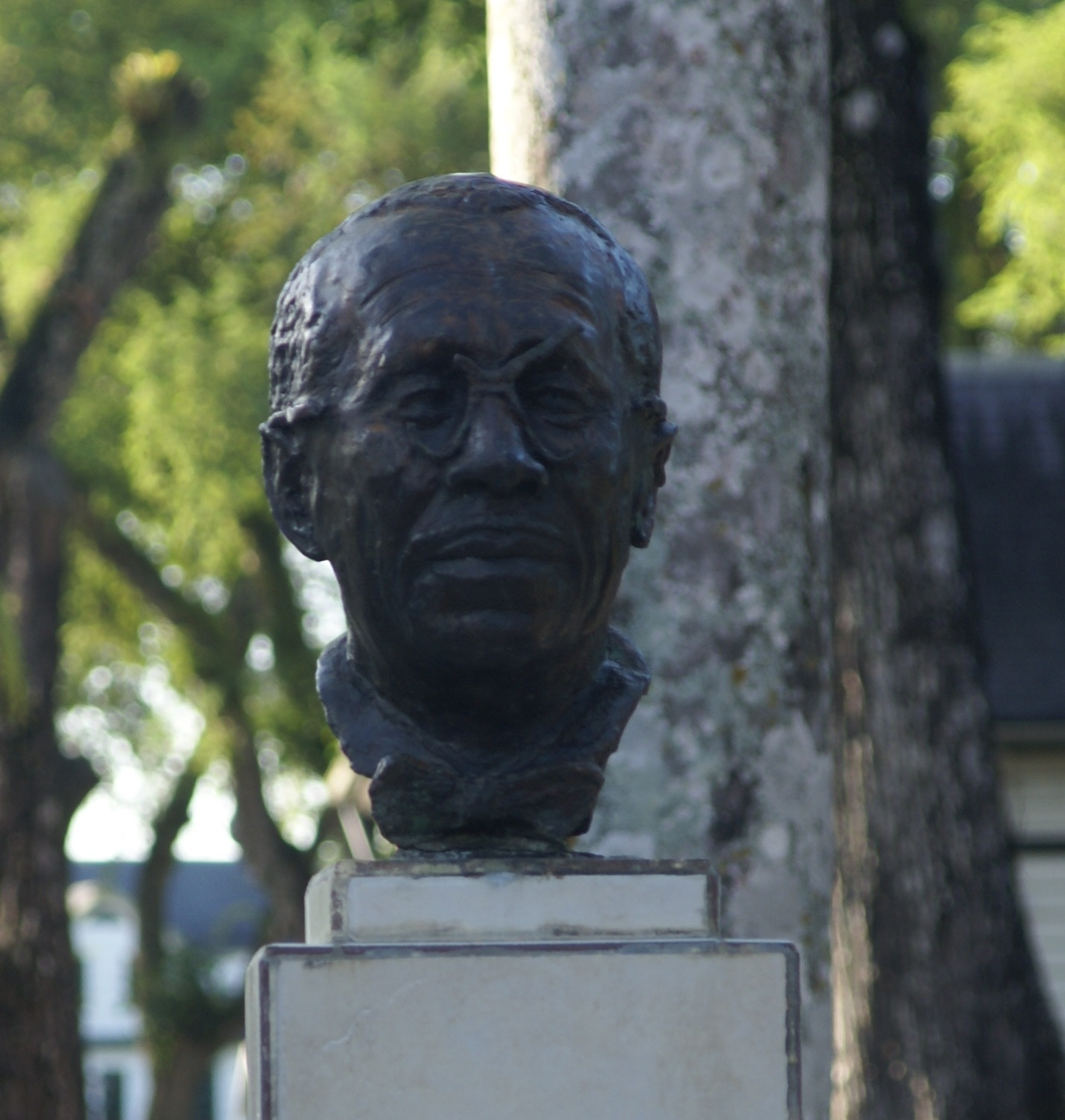
Eddy Snijders monument in Paramaribo

Richenel Edgar Snijders, commonly known as Eddy Snijders (12 May 1923 — 19 January 1990) was a Surinamese composer, conductor, and flute player.

He is considered as an innovator of Surinamese music, since he incorporated local traditions, including kaseko, to symphonic music. He made the arrangement of the Surinamese national anthem.

== Biography ==
Snijders was born in Paramaribo. His father was a musician, and several of his brothers became musicians, but he did not get formal musical education. He became a professional musician with the Military Chapel of Suriname and later also its director. Snijders also organized a youth orchestra where many Surinamese musicians started their career.

In 1947, Snijders married Olga Ooft. The family had nine children, one of whom is the jazz musician Ronald Snijders.
