= Iding Soemita =

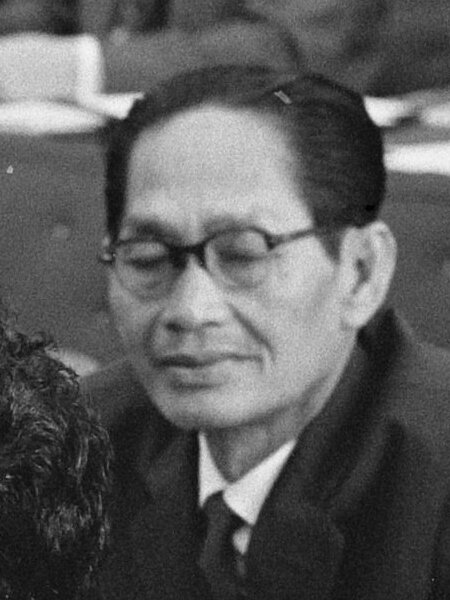

Estates of Suriname
- In office 1949–1972

Personal details
- Born: 3 April 1908 Tasikmalaya, West Java, Dutch East Indies
- Died: 18 November 2001 (aged 93) Commewijne, Suriname
- Party: Party for National Unity and Solidarity

Iding Soemita (3 April 1908 – 18 November 2001) was an Indonesian-Surinamese politician. He was the leader of the Surinamese political party Kaum Tani Persatuan Indonesia ("United Indonesian Farmers" - KTPI), that represented the Indonesian Surinamese community. He was the father of the later party chairman Willy Soemita.

== Biography ==
Soemita was born in Tasikmalaya and was a Sundanese people. At the age of seventeen, he emigrated to Suriname as an indentured labourer, where he arrived in 1925. Later he became a nurse and shopkeeper in Paramaribo.

In 1946, Soemita founded the political party Persatuan Indonesia ("the Unity of Indonesia"), which in 1949 became Kaum Tani Persatuan Indonesia (later renamed to Kerukunan Tulodo Pranatan Inggil - "Party for National Unity and Solidarity"). In May 1949, at the first elections with universal suffrage in Suriname, the party won 2 parliamentary seats. As a representative of the Javanese Surinamese community, he participated several times in discussions with the Netherlands about Suriname's autonomy.

Soemita was seen as the first outspoken political leader of the Javanese community in Suriname. He made strategic use of the intermediate position that his party took in every government coalition. In 1972, he retired from politics. He passed the party leadership to his son Willy.
