= Willy Soemita =

Surinamese politician (1936–2022)

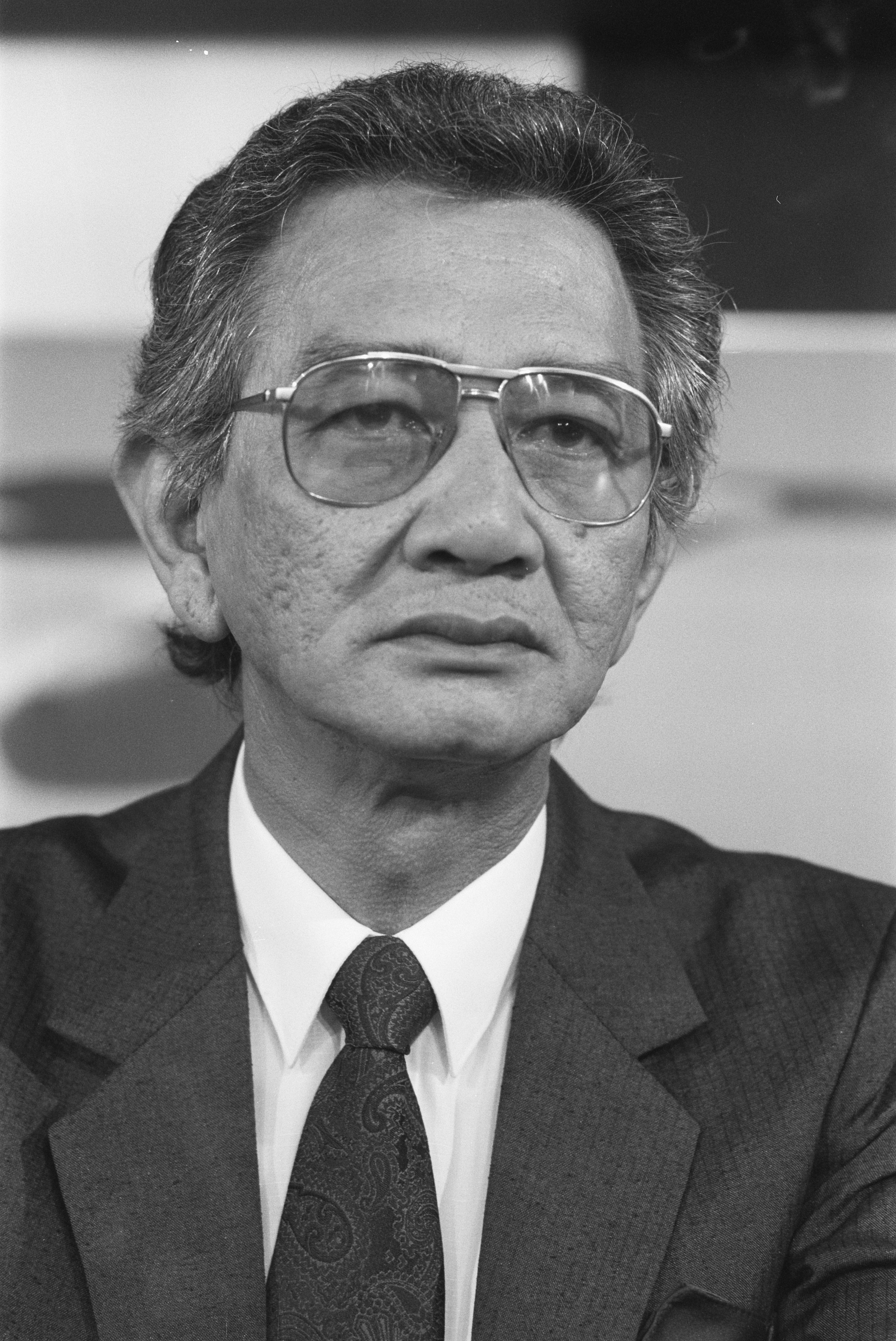

Deputy Vice President of Suriname
- In office 25 January 1988 – 24 December 1990
- President: Ramsewak Shankar
- Preceded by: position established
- Succeeded by: position abolished

Minister of Social Affairs and Housing
- In office 25 January 1988 – 24 December 1990
- President: Ramsewak Shankar
- Preceded by: Ewald Grep
- Succeeded by: René Kaaiman
- In office 16 September 1991 – 15 September 1996
- President: Ronald Venetiaan
- Preceded by: René Kaaiman
- Succeeded by: Soewarto Moestadja

Minister for Agriculture, Livestock and Fisheries
- In office 24 December 1973 – 28 December 1977
- Prime Minister: Henck Arron
- Preceded by: Radjnarain Nannan Panday
- Succeeded by: Cornelis Ardjosemito

Personal details
- Born: William Soemita; 1 March 1936 Commewijne, Suriname
- Died: 23 September 2022 (aged 86) Suriname
- Party: Party for National Unity and Solidarity

William Soemita (1 March 1936 – 23 September 2022) was a Surinamese parliamentarian and minister. He was the only Deputy Vice President of Suriname, serving from 1988 to 1990.

His father Iding Soemita was born in West Java and came as an indentured labourer to Suriname where he founded the political party Kerukunan Tulodo Pranatan Inggil (KTPI) in 1949. In August 1972, Willy succeeded his father as chairman of the Javanese Surinamese party.

== Career ==
Soemita became head of the Ministry of Economic Affairs, then Minister of Agriculture, Livestock and Fisheries in 1973. After the restoration of democracy in Suriname, Soemita returned as minister in 1988, taking the portfolio of Minister of Social Affairs and Housing. This ended in 1990 because of the military coup known as the "telephone coup". From 1991 to 1996 he was again Minister.

In 2005, he coached Sonny Kertoidjojo to succeed him as chairman of the KTPI. However, in early 2007, Kertoidjojo decided not to run. The then 71-year-old Soemita was then re-elected as chairman of KTPI.

In November 2019, Soemita retired from his position as party chairman, and was succeeded by Iwan Ganga. Soemita said that he would remain active in the party and support the new chairman.
