= Communist Party of Suriname =

- Leader: Bram Behr
- Founder: Bram Behr
- Founded: 1981
- Membership: 25 (1985)
- Ideology: Communism; Hoxhaism
- Political position: Far-left

The Communist Party of Suriname (Dutch: Kommunistische Partij van Suriname) was a communist party in Suriname.

Surinamese Marxists founded the party in 1973, and they ran candidates in the 1977 Surinamese election under the label "Democratic People's Front", winning 0.78% of the vote, and no seats. The party was ideologically aligned with the People's Socialist Republic of Albania, and Hoxhaism.

No member of the party was ever elected to political office in Suriname. Bram Behr, the leader of the party, was imprisoned and executed in 1982. The party published a journal called Modro, which was edited by Behr.

It had about 25 members in 1985, and had effectively dissolved by the end of the Cold War.
