= Hugo Rijhiner =

Hugo Desiré Rijhiner
- Born: 8 March 1905; Paramaribo, Suriname
- Died: 6 January 1991 (aged 85); Utrecht, Netherlands
- Military career
- Allegiance: Netherlands
- Branch: Royal Netherlands East Indies Army; Royal Netherlands Air Force
- Service years: 1931–1953
- Rank: Captain
- Conflicts: World War II; Battle of Rotterdam
- Awards: Military William Order, Knight 4th class

Hugo Desiré Rijhiner RMWO (8 March 1905 – 6 January 1991) was a Surinamese officer in the Royal Netherlands East Indies Army who was awarded the Military William Order for his actions in the Battle of Rotterdam. Together with Harry Voss, Rijhiner remains one of only two Surinamese soldiers to have been awarded the Military William Order.

== Biography ==
Rijhiner joined the Royal Netherlands East Indies Army (KNIL) in the 1920s. After he was promoted to sub-lieutenant on 24 June 1939, Rijhiner was granted a temporary leave from the military and subsequently left the Dutch East Indies for the Netherlands, with the intention to travel onwards to Suriname. While he was in the Netherlands, the Second World War broke out, and Rijhiner was mobilized for the war effort in Europe.

During the Battle of Rotterdam, Rijhiner was responsible for the defence of an ammunition depot in Overschie. While inspecting his troops on 12 May 1940, Rijhiner was shot in his left thigh by friendly fire, presumably because his wearing a KNIL uniform with a Dutch army coat and helmet was considered suspicious by one of the soldiers. Despite being wounded, and against the advice of his superiors, Rijhiner moved back to the front the next day, to defend the ammunition depot. This move was the basis for the decision to award Rijhiner with the Military William Order, which was promulgated by royal decree by Queen Wilhelmina of the Netherlands on 26 June 1946.

After the surrender of the Dutch army on 14 May 1940, Rijhiner went into hiding and joined the Dutch resistance while adopting the hiding name "Reinier". He was eventually apprehended by the Sicherheitsdienst and after a short incarceration at Scheveningen prison sent to a camp in Darmstadt.
