= Ronald Snijders =

Dutch musician and author (b. 1951)

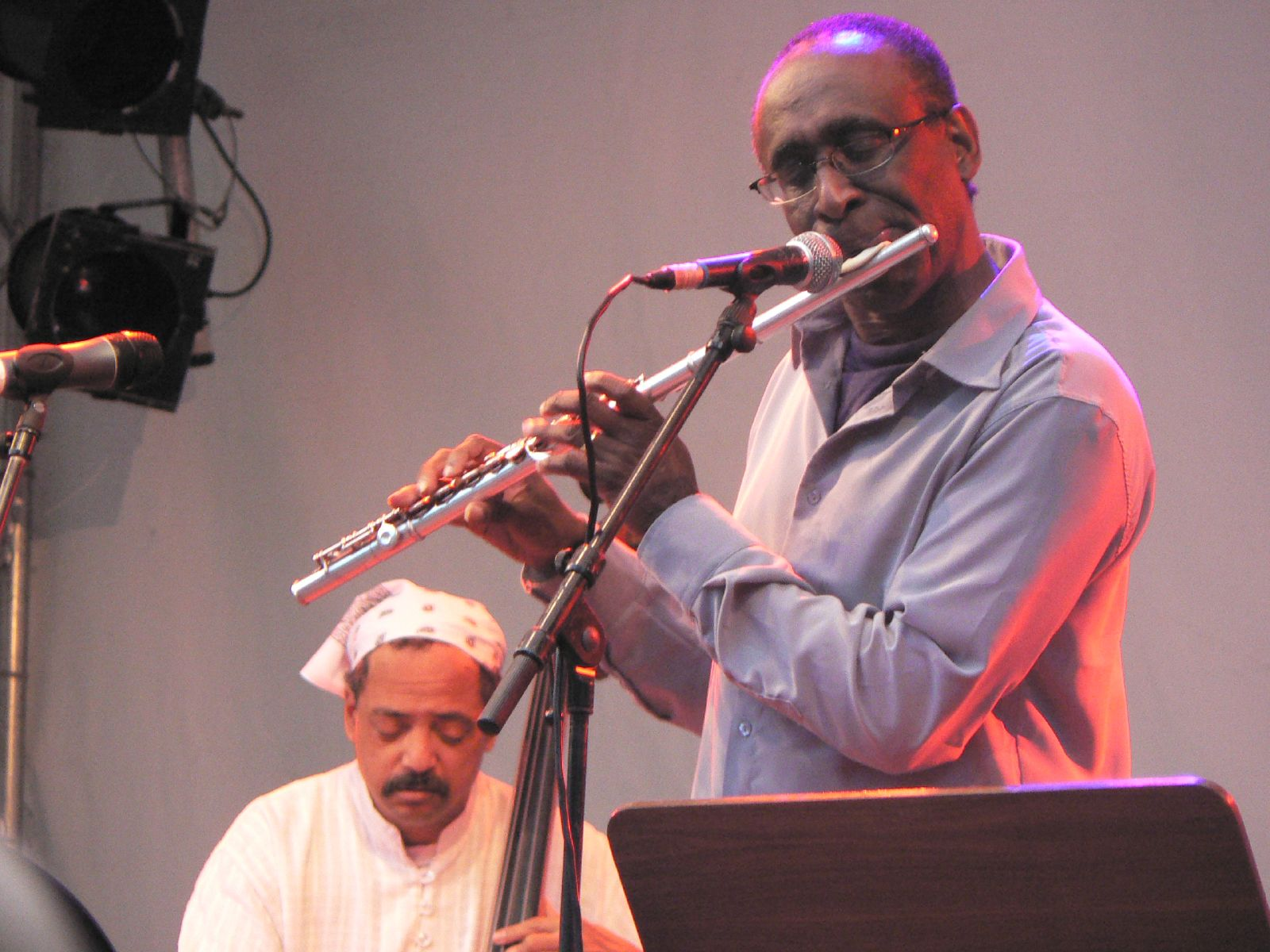
Ronald Snijders

Ronald Snijders (born April 8, 1951) is a Dutch jazz musician and author of Surinamese origin. The flute is his main instrument.

== Biography ==
Snijders was born in Paramaribo as son of Surinamese composer Eddy Snijders and Olga Ooft. He began learning the flute at seven years old. Eventually he would also learn to play guitar, piano, percussion, and saxophone. In 1970, he moved to the Netherlands to study engineering at the Delft University of Technology. He stayed in Europe to work as a musician, whereas he first played for Willem Breuker, whose collective deep he served until 1977. In 1973, he won the NOS Jazz Concours in Laren. Since 1977, he has focused on working with his own band, with which he also appeared at the North Sea Jazz Festival, as in many European countries but also in Western and Southern Africa, the Caribbean and North America. In his compositions he often draws on Kaseko, a musical genre of his homeland, but also to elements of pop and world music. With Kaseko he worked intensively during his musicological studies, which he completed from 1986 through 1991 at the University of Amsterdam. On his albums, he played alongside ethno-jazz, the compositions of his father, and children's music. On top of all of that, he has also performed with the Metropole Orchestra.

As an author, he has submitted a biography of his father named, and a collection of short stories.

He was appointed a Knight of the Order of Orange-Nassau in 2001.

== Discography ==
- Natural Sources (1977)
- "A Safe Return" (1980)
- "Black Straight Music" (1981)
- Quartz (1983)
- Funky Flute (1985)
- Portable Beach (1992)
- Kaseko Mundial! Live (1996)
- Meet the World (1998)
- The Best Of (1999)
- Variyento (2004)
- West by West / Soulkawina (2005)
- Ronald Snyders to Africa (2005)
- Ronald Snijders extended funk band (2008)
- The Nelson & Djosa Sessions (2016)

== Bibliography ==
- Surinaams van de straat (1994), ISBN 90-5333-282-0
- Surinam Kaseko melodies (1996), Notes)
- Geef mij maar een Surinamer (1996), ISBN 90-5333-453-X
- De man met de piccolo (1998; Biography of Eddy Snijders), ISBN 90-5429-098-6
