= Anil Ramdas =

Dutch-Surinamese journalist (1958-2012)

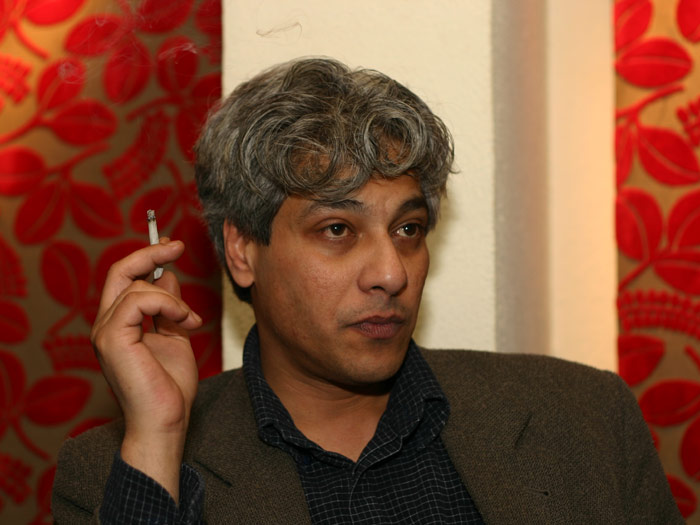
- Born: 16 February 1958; Paramaribo, Suriname
- Died: 16 February 2012 (aged 54); Loenen aan de Vecht, Netherlands
- Occupations: Columnist, correspondent, journalist, television presenter, writer, essayist

Anil Ramdas (Paramaribo, 16 February 1958 – Loenen aan de Vecht, 16 February 2012) was a Dutch-Surinamese columnist, correspondent, essayist, journalist, and TV and radio host. He was generally considered the V.S. Naipaul specialist of The Netherlands.

His work has been extensively studied by the author Karin Amatmoekrim.

In 1997 he was awarded the E. du Perron prize for all of his works.

In 2017, five years after his death, political magazine De Groene Amsterdammer, cultural centre De Balie and the family of Ramdas initiated the Anil Ramdas Essay Prize. The fourth edition of the prize took place in 2025.

== Biography ==
Ramdas was the third child of radio producer Kamla Sukul and teacher Haripersad Ramdas. He grew up in a Indo-Surinamese community in Nickerie and in the capital city of Paramaribo. In 1977, he moved to Amsterdam to study human geography. During his studies, he stayed in places including Mumbai and Curaçao. In Curaçao, he conducted oral history research into the influence of the Catholic Church and big business (Shell) on gender relations. In 1986, he graduated cum laude with a theoretical thesis on the ways people incorporate dominant ideologies into their life stories.

=== Doctoral research ===
Ramdas subsequently conducted research for the University of Amsterdam on the ways asylum seekers’ refugee narratives were constructed by immigration authorities. The publication of his first findings in 1987 in a research report for Amnesty International led to a preliminary injunction filed by the Dutch Ministry of Justice, which argued that the data he had collected was confidential. The ministry lost the case, but on appeal demanded “absolute anonymisation” in his forthcoming dissertation: none of the five hundred refugee narratives collected from asylum seekers could be traceable to the thirteen immigration judges (members of the former Aliens Commission). The court upheld this demand, after which Ramdas prematurely ended his doctoral research.

=== Journalistic career ===
In 1989, he became an editor at De Groene Amsterdammer, and in 1990 and 1991 he and Stephan Sanders were responsible for the fortnightly essay supplement, which aimed to develop a new form of essay writing in the Netherlands combining personal, journalistic, and academic observation.

In 1992, Ramdas became a columnist, essayist, and travel reporter for NRC Handelsblad. That same year, on 21 June, he appeared as a guest on the VPRO television programme Zomergasten, in which he explained his journalistic and essayistic methods through film and documentary excerpts. In 1993 and 1994, he presented the VPRO series In Mijn Vaders Huis, featuring interviews with thinkers including Stuart Hall, Kwame Anthony Appiah, Arjun Appadurai, Nawal El Saadawi, Frits Staal, Benedict Anderson, and Edward Said. The interviews addressed topics such as cultural conflict and the role of academia and the media. The series was later published in two volumes.

From 1995 to 1997, Ramdas hosted the weekly VPRO radio programme Zilte Stranden, in which world travellers were interviewed for an hour at a time. From 1998 to 2000, he presented the NPS radio programme Weldenkende Mensen, featuring discussions with experts and specialists on current affairs. In 1995, together with filmmaker Fred van Dijk, he produced a four-part documentary on Suriname for the VPRO titled Wel de snack maar niet de saus. A year later, again with Van Dijk, he produced a three-part documentary on the “discovery” of Africa titled Vraag het aan de maan. From 1997 to 2000, he and Stephan Sanders co-presented the VPRO media programme Het Blauwe Licht, which practised “close reading” of television programmes and news photography. In 2005, together with Peter van Ingen, he produced the VPRO theme evening De grote avond van de beschaving.

From 2000 to 2003, Ramdas served as foreign correspondent in India for NRC Handelsblad. Upon returning to the Netherlands, he became director of the debate centre De Balie in Amsterdam in 2003. He left De Balie at the end of 2005 after the institution encountered financial difficulties during his directorship. In 2007, he spent a year living in Suriname, which formed the basis for Paramaribo: de vrolijkste stad in de jungle (2009), a critical reflection on the country.

For NRC Handelsblad, he and Maarten Huygen wrote the column De Reizende Commentator. Ramdas was also a guest columnist for De Groene Amsterdammer and wrote a monthly essay for the Flemish-Dutch cultural house deBuren.

From September 2010 until early 2012, he presented the opinion programme Z.O.Z., produced for the VPRO by the media company MTNL. On 15 February 2012, one day before his death, he recorded his final episode of the programme.

== Works ==
=== Fiction ===
Anil Ramdas published his autobiographical novel Badal in February 2011. In the article "A Matter of Identity: Anil Ramdas and His Autobiographical Novel Badal", Kees Snoek writes :

The novel Badal explores the evolution of the main character against the background of the confrontation between western and non-western civilisation. One of the examples Badal uses to make his point is Christopher Columbus: when during his journey into the unknown the supplies aboard his ship diminish, he has to make a decision: to turn back or to continue with his exploration. He decides to go on. It is the point of no return.

== Death ==
Ramdas committed suicide on 16 February 2012. Dutch Prime Minister Mark Rutte expressed his regret about Ramdas' death in his weekly press conference.
