= Max Woiski Sr. =

Surinamese musician (1911–1981)

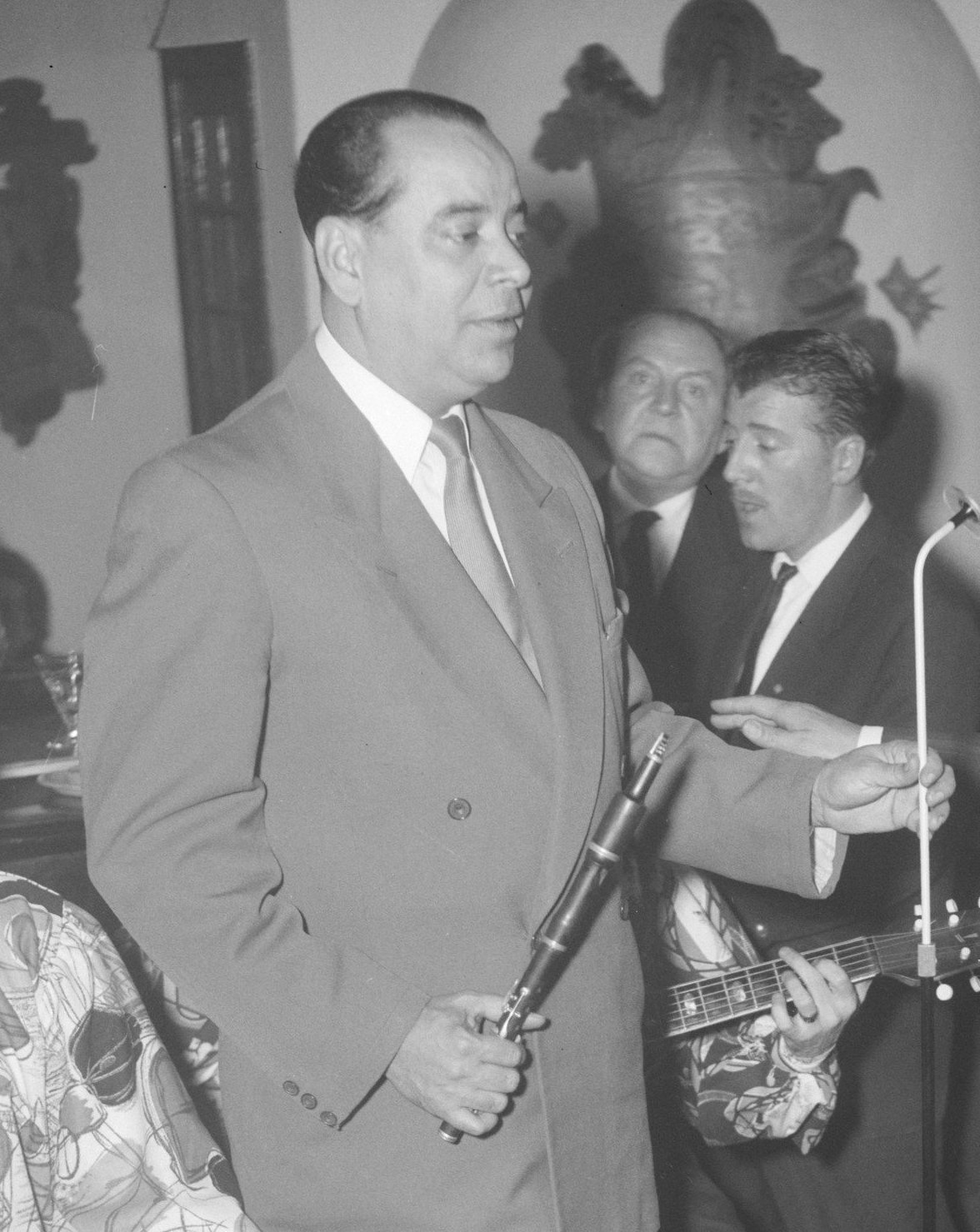

Background information
- Also known as: José Baretto
- Born: Max Woiski; February 11, 1911; Domburg, Suriname
- Died: January 31, 1981 (aged 69) Hoogeveen, Netherlands
- Genres: Jazz, Latin
- Occupations: Singer, flutist, composer
- Years active: 1937–1980

Max Woiski Sr. (February 11, 1911 – January 31, 1981) was a Surinamese musician.

== Career ==
Woiski started to make popular music in the 1930s in Amsterdam. In his own club La Cubana in Amsterdam, he performed under the name "José Baretto" and mainly participated in Latin American music with his orchestra. In the 1950s, he switched to Surinamese music. His biggest hit was B.B. met R. (Brown beans and rice).

At the end of the 1950s, Woiski left for Mallorca, where he bought a nightclub. Here he performed with his orchestra for years. He died in 1981.

His son Max Woiski Jr., brought to the Netherlands by his father when he needed a guitarist in his orchestra, started the nightclub La Tropicana in Amsterdam after his father's departure. In the 1960s, he had his own production company MMP, for which records were produced by CNR Records. Notable artists who were signed by Woiski include Ciska Peters and Edwin Rutten. His music was also very popular in the Netherlands. His granddaughter Lils Mackintosh is a jazz and blues singer.

== Discography ==
Albums

- Successen (1973)
- Bigi Brasa (1998)
- Ritmo Tropical (2011)
