= Karin Amatmoekrim =

Surinamese writer

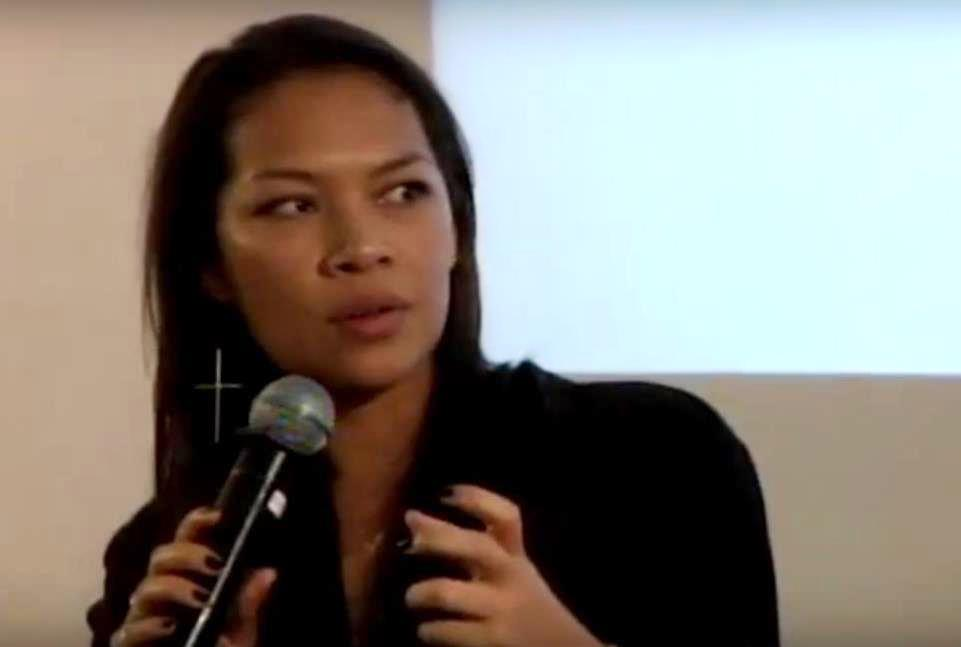
- Amatmoekrim (2017)
- Born: 25 December 1976 (age 49); Paramaribo, Suriname
- Education: University of Amsterdam
- Occupation: Writer
- Writing career
- Language: Dutch
- Years active: 2004–present
- Notable awards: Black Magic Woman Literature Prize (2009)
- Website: www.amatmoekrim.com

Karin Amatmoekrim (born 25 December 1976) is a Surinamese writer. She has written five novels and won the 2009 Black Magic Woman Literature Prize for Titus and was awarded the 2024 Dutch biography prize for In wat voor een land leef ik eigenlijk?, a biography on Anil Ramdas.

== Biography ==
Karin Amatmoekrim was born on 25 December 1976 in Paramaribo, Suriname. In 1981, she emigrated from Suriname to the Netherlands and grew up in IJmuiden. She attended the Gymnasium in Velsen, and then studied Modern Literature at the University of Amsterdam, graduating with a thesis on "The ethnicity in Literature in Suriname".

In 2004, she published her first novel, Het knipperleven ("The glare of life"), which was enthusiastically received by the press. In 2006, it was followed by Wanneer wij samen zijn ("When we are together"), a novel based on the story of several generations of the Amatmoekrim family. In 2009 appeared the novel Titus. Amatmoekrim has also published short stories in De Groene Amsterdammer and Vrij Nederland. Her PhD-research in modern literature, studying the work and life of Anil Ramdas and his ideas on identity, multiculturalism, populism and the role of the black intellectual in western societies. The dissertation on Ramdas has been published as a biography.

Karin Amatmoekrim is married to Jesse Smit, the founder of the brand FreshCotton. She has two children, Sumina Smit (15) and Lee Benjamin Smit (10).

== Awards ==
In 2009, she was the first recipient of the Black Magic Woman Literature Prize for her novel Titus. In 2024 she was awarded the 2024 Dutch biography prize for her biography In wat voor een land leef ik eigenlijk? about Anil Ramdas.

== Selected works ==
- 2004: Het knipperleven (The flash life)
- 2006: Wanneer wij samen zijn (When we are together)
- 2009: Titus (Titus)
- 2011: Het gym (The gymnasium)
- 2013: De man van veel (The man of many)
- 2016: Tenzij de vader (Unless the father)
- 2023: In wat voor land leef ik eigenlijk? : Anil Ramdas, onmogelijk kosmopoliet (In what country do I live?)
