= Culture of Suriname =

Surinamese culture has strong Asian, African and European influences. The population is mainly composed of the contribution of people from India, Africa, China, Europe, and Indonesia, as well as indigenous peoples who lived in the area, before the arrival of European settlers.

== Cultural events ==
- New Year's Day
- Holi-Phagwa
- Easter
- Labour Day
- Prawas Din (Indian Arrival Day)
- Keti Koti
- Javanese Arrival Day
- Indigenous People's Day
- Day of the Maroons
- Chinese Arrival Day
- Independence Day
- Diwali
- Eid-ul-Fitr
- Eid-ul-Adha
- Christmas

== Music ==
Suriname is known for its kaseko music and Baithak Gana as well as other Indo-Caribbean music traditions.

The term kaseko is probably derived from the French expression casser le corps ('break the body'), which was used during slavery to indicate a very swift dance. Kaseko is a fusion of numerous popular and folk styles derived from Africa, Europe and the Americas. It is rhythmically complex, with percussion instruments including skratji (a very large bass drum) and snare drums, as well as saxophone, trumpet and occasionally trombone. Singing can be both solo and choir. Songs are typically call-and-response, as are Creole folk styles from the area, such as kawina.

Kaseko emerged from the traditional Afro-Surinamese kawina music, which was played since the beginning of 1900 by street musicians in Paramaribo. It evolved in the 1930s during festivities that used large bands, especially brass bands, and was called Bigi Poku (big drum music). In the late 1940s, jazz, calypso and other importations became popular, while rock and roll soon left its own influence in the form of electrified instruments.

The biennial music festival SuriPop is the country's largest music event.

== Cuisine ==
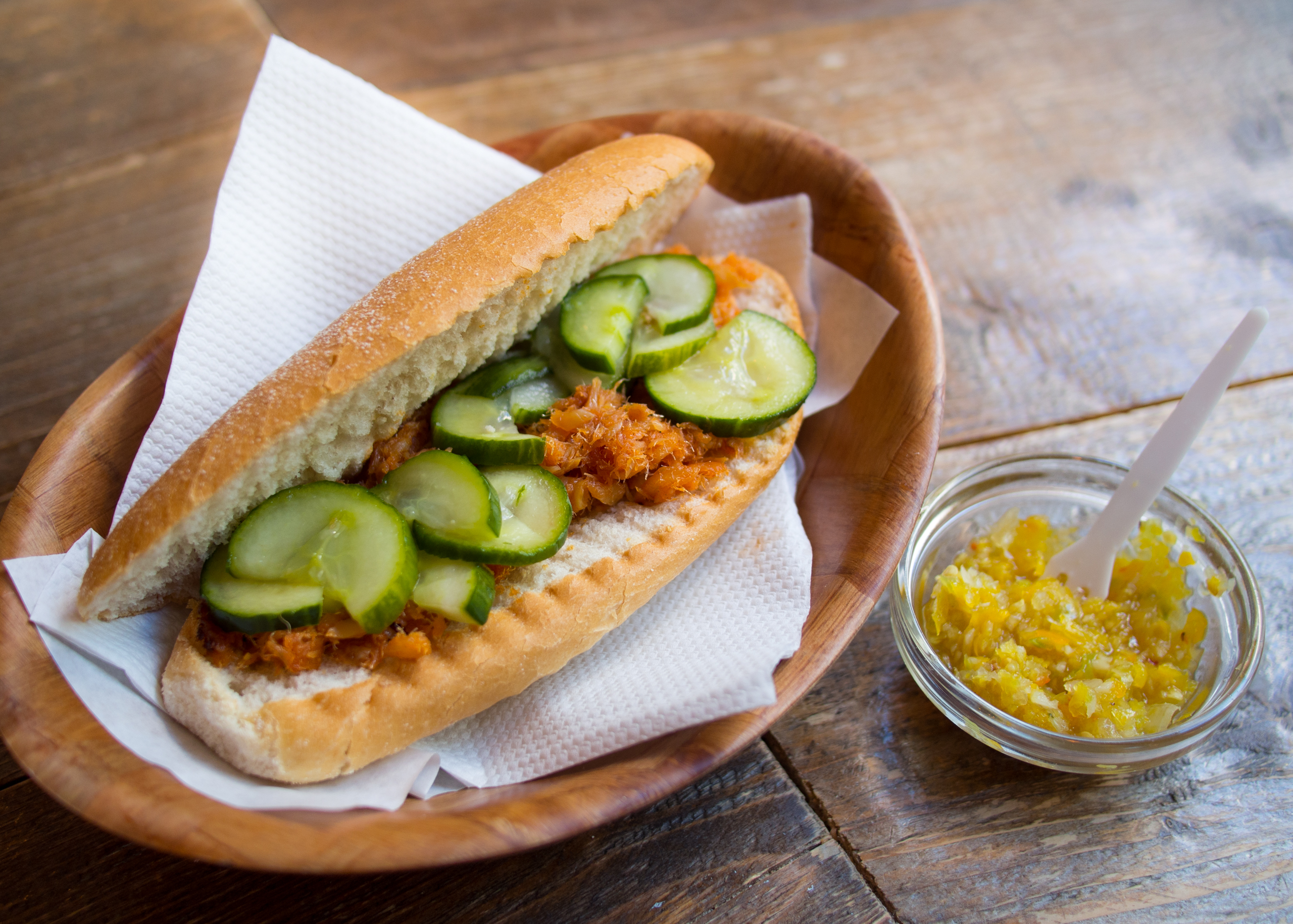
A Surinamese "broodje bakkeljauw" in the Netherlands (bun with shredded and spiced stockfish), with a chili paste made from Madame Jeanette peppers on the side

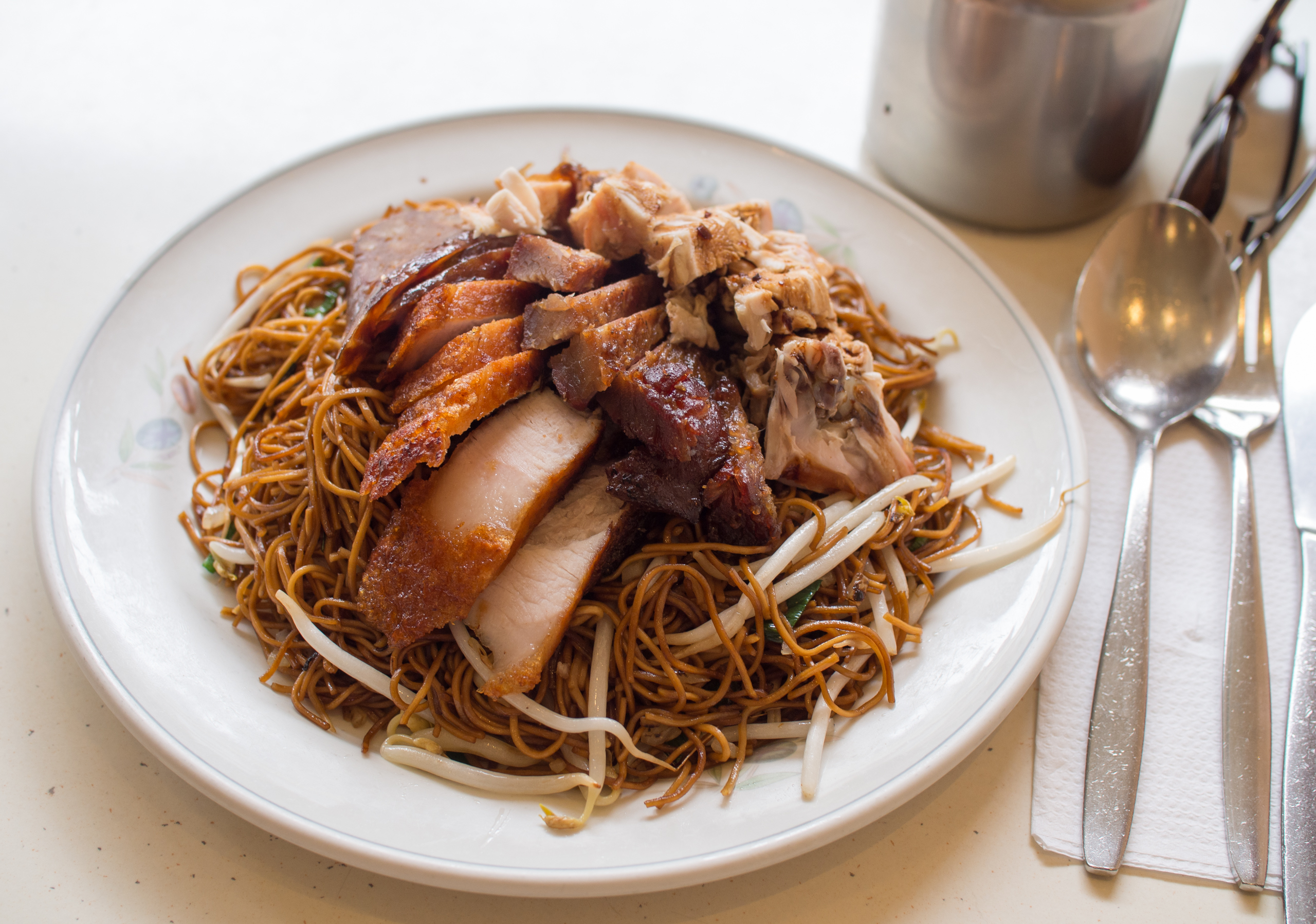
Tjauw min moksi meti

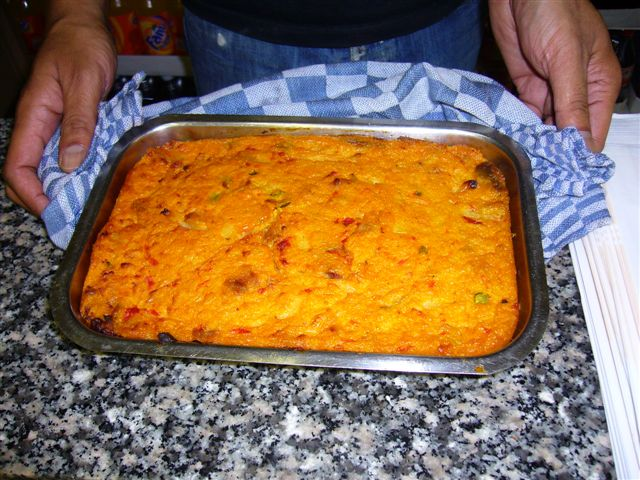
Pom

Surinamese cuisine is extensive, since the population of Suriname came from many countries. Surinamese cuisine is a combination of many international cuisines including Indian/South Asian, West African, Creole, Indonesian (Javanese), Chinese, Dutch, British, French, Jewish, Portuguese, and Amerindian cuisines. This has ensured that Surinamese cooking has spawned many dishes; the different groups were influenced by each other's dishes and ingredients. This new Surinamese cuisine included roti, nasi goreng, bami, pom, snesi foroe, moksi meti, and losi foroe. Basic foods include rice, plants such as tayer and cassava, and roti. Usually, there is chicken on the menu in many variations of the Chinese snesi foroe, the Indian chicken curry and pom, a very popular party dish of Creole origin. Also, salted meat and stockfish (bakkeljauw) are widely used. Yardlong beans, okra, and eggplant are examples of vegetables in the Surinamese kitchen. For a spicy taste, Madame Jeanette peppers are used.

Besides the casserole pom, roti (often served with a filling of chicken curry, potato and vegetables) is also often served on festive occasions with many guests. Other well-known dishes are moksi-alesi (mixed boiled rice with salted meat, shrimp or fish, and any vegetable), rice and beans, peanut soup, battered fried plantain, bara and the original Javanese nasi goreng and mie goreng.

Desserts include boyo, a sweet cake made with coconut and cassava, and fiadu, a cake containing raisins, currants, almonds, and succade. Maizena koek are cornstarch cookies made with vanilla.

== See also ==
- Surinamese literature

== Literature ==
- Bakker, Eveline, et al., eds. Geschiedenis van Suriname: Van stam tot staat, 2nd ed., 1998.
- Binnendijk, Chandra van, and Paul Faber, eds. Sranan: Cultuur in Suriname, 1992.
- Bruijning, C. F. A., and J. Voorhoeve, eds. Encyclopedie van Suriname, 1978.
- Buddingh', Hans. Geschiedenis van Suriname, 2nd ed., 1995.
- Colchester, Marcus. Forest Politics in Suriname, 1995.
- Dew, Edward M. The Difficult Flowering of Surinam: Ethnicity and Politics in a Plural Society, 1978.
- Economist Intelligence Unit. Country Profile Suriname 1998–99, 1999.
- Hoefte, Rosemarijn. Suriname, 1990.
- Lier, R. A. J. van. Frontier Society: A Social Analysis of the History of Surinam, 1971.
- Meel, Peter. "Towards a Typology of Suriname Nationalism." New West Indian Guide 72 (3/4): 257–281, 1998.
- Oostindie, Gert. Het paradijs overzee: De 'Nederlandse' Caraiben en Nederland, 1997.
- Plotkin, Mark. J. Tales of a Shaman's Apprentice: An Ethnobotanist Searches for New Medicines in the Amazon Rain Forest, 1993.
- Price, Richard. First-Time: The Historical Vision of an Afro-American People, 1983.
- Sedoc-Dahlberg, Betty, ed. The Dutch Caribbean: Prospects for Democracy, 1990.
- Szulc-Krzyzanowski, Michel, and Michiel van Kempen. Deep-Rooted Words: Ten Storytellers and Writers from Surinam (South America), 1992.
