= Indo-Guyanese =

Ethnic group in Guyana

Total population
- 297,493 (2012 census)

Regions with significant populations
- Guyana: East Berbice-Corentyne; Essequibo Islands-West Demerara; Demerara-Mahaica; Mahaica-Berbice; Pomeroon-Supenaam; Upper Demerara-Berbice; Overseas: United States; Canada; United Kingdom; Netherlands; Suriname; Trinidad and Tobago; Barbados; Saint Martin; Virgin Islands; other Caribbean countries

Languages
- Colonial Languages: English (Guyanese English Creole); Dutch; South Asian Languages: Guyanese Hindustani; Tamil; Other languages of South Asia

Religion
- Majority: Hinduism; Minority: Islam · Christianity · Others

Related ethnic groups
- Indo-Caribbean people; British Indo-Caribbean people; Indo-Caribbean Americans; Indo-Trinidadians and Tobagonians; Indo-Surinamese; Indo-Jamaicans; Indo-Fijians; Indo-Mauritians; Indian South Africans; British Indians; Indian Americans; Indo-Canadians; Indian people; Indian diaspora; Bihari-U.P. diaspora; South Asian diaspora

Indo-Guyanese or Guyanese Indians are people in Guyana of Indian ancestry, primarily descended from indentured laborers brought from India to British Guiana (modern-day Guyana) during the 19th and early 20th centuries. They represent the largest ethnic group in Guyana, accounting for around 40% of the population, according to the 2012 census.

The vast majority of indentured labourers in Guyana came from North India, most notably the Bhojpur and Awadh regions in the Hindi Belt of the present-day states of Uttar Pradesh, Bihar and Jharkhand. A significant minority also came from South India, notably Tamil Nadu and Andhra Pradesh. Among the immigrants, there were also labourers from other parts of South Asia. The vast majority of Indians came as contract labourers during the 19th century, spurred on by political upheaval, the ramifications of the Mutiny of 1857 and famine. Others of higher social status arrived as merchants, landowners and farmers pushed out of India by many of the same factors.

A large Indo-Guyanese diaspora is also found in countries such as the United States, Canada and the United Kingdom.

== History ==
Indian immigration to the British West Indies was triggered by Great Britain's decision in the 1833 to outlaw the enslavement of labour brought from Africa. Newly emancipated Africans wanted livable wages and the British did not want to comply. This led sugar plantation owners to look elsewhere for workers. After initially seeking laborers from Madeira (Portugal) in 1835, colonial recruitment turned to British India. Indian indentured immigrants began arriving in British Guiana from 1838 onwards.

The indentured labour system became the replacement system for slavery in British Guiana. Persisting for 75 years, this system of indentured servitude presented its own forms of injustices, creating conflict with Indian nationalists who pushed for its end in 1917. One major distinction between slavery and the indentured immigrant experience was that the indentured labourers from India had agreed to immigration, signing contracts that bound them to a plantation for five years, while earning a small, fixed daily wage. After five additional years working in Guiana (for a total of 10 years), survivors would be entitled either to receive passage back to India or to stay in Guiana and receive land and money to start their own businesses.

In 1838, some 396 Indian immigrants arrived in British Guiana from Calcutta. Over the next nine decades, up to 1928, 239,909 Indian immigrants arrived. Of these 75,547 returned home, the remainder constitute the ancestors of today's Indo-Guyanese.

For the first 25 years, indentured recruits were drawn largely from small towns in and around Calcutta, but people were recruited from as far as Sri Lanka.

As with indentured servitude in North America, the backbone of all recruiting operations were professional recruiters, assisted by paid local agents called "Arkatis" in North India and "Maistris" in South India. Intimidation, coercion, and deception were common, as were illegal practices, such as kidnapping and forced detention. An example of deception related to labourers who signed to immigrate to Surinam; recruiters would pronounce the country as "Sri-Ram," which would be perceived as the names of two Hindu deities with complex but very positive connotations.

The lifestyles of Indian indentured servants in places like British Guiana and Danish St. Croix were later compared to examine the flaws of the indenture system and why it was eventually abolished. Many Indians had no control over their own wages, because of this they faced debt. The systematic mistreatment of Indians resulted in the downfall of indenture.

In addition to having to deal with lack of freedoms, intense heat, and brutal working conditions, these indentured servants faced animosity from the newly freed Afro-Guyanese population who felt that their chance to earn a living was undercut by the very low wages paid to the Indian immigrants.

Indian workers on plantations struggled with racism and colorism, they faced difficult times because the colonial officials who were there for protection usually aligned with the white planter class. Indentured workers also struggled to report the abuse they faced because of language barriers.

=== Monuments ===
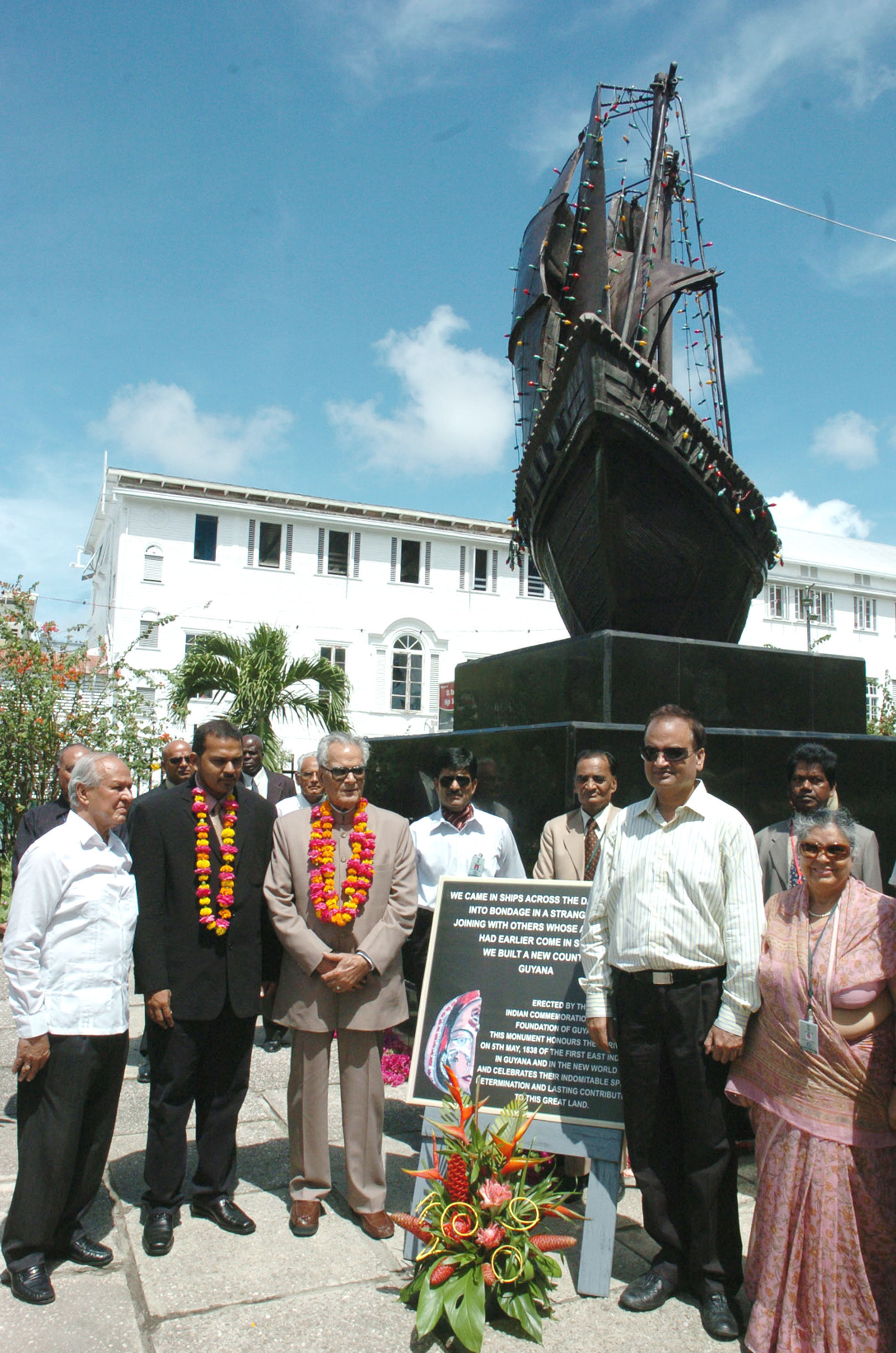
Indian vice president Bhairon Singh Shekhawat visits the Whitby monument

On 5 May 1988, a bronze sculpture of the Whitby, the ship which carried the first labourers to British Guiana, was presented to the people of Guyana by the Indian government. It is located in the Guyana National Park in Georgetown.

On 5 May 2019, the Indian Immigration Monument was unveiled by president David A. Granger. It is located in Palmyra near the Berbice Bridge. The compound near the monument has a visitor's gallery, several fountains and a playground.

== Culture ==
Although Indian settlers maintained their traditions, the culture of the community is unique to Guyana. The Indo-Guyanese community originates from various regions and cultures in India, and as a result, over time in Guyana, they have cultivated a distinctive modern Indo-Guyanese culture that cannot be exclusively attributed to any specific sub-group within contemporary India.

=== Cultural origins and religion ===
Between 1838 and 1917, over 500 ship voyages, with 238,909 indentured Indian immigrants, came to Guyana. Some 75,898 of them or their children were recorded as returning to the subcontinent.

The most popular dialect of Hindi spoken was Bhojpuri (spoken in east Uttar Pradesh and west Bihar), followed by Awadhi (spoken in central Uttar Pradesh). 62% of the immigrants came from districts that are now part of the Indian state of Uttar Pradesh; 20% from Bihar; 6% were from pre-partitioned Bengal; 1% from Haryana and Punjab; 2% from Chota Nagpur and surrounding areas (primarily Jharkhand and Odisha); 1% from Central India (primarily Madhya Pradesh); 1% from Native states (primarily Rajasthan); 2% from other parts of India; 5% from the Madras Presidency (Tamil Nadu and Andhra Pradesh).

95% of all the immigrants left from the port of Calcutta (Kolkata), and 5% from the port of Madras (Chennai). Note, no immigrants left from the port of Bombay (Mumbai) to Guyana during the period of 1838 to 1917.

Based on the names and information on the Indian Emigrant passes, 85% of the Indian immigrants to Guyana were Hindus and 15% Muslims. This was very representative of the areas of origin of the immigrants.

The Indian immigrants made an enduring cultural imprint on Guyana. Once their labor contracts expired, they resumed their original occupations and recreated near-typical traditional Indian village life in their adopted homeland.

Indian migrants who were returning after completing their indenture contracts, faced difficult times when it came to re-integrating into their communities. In India, there were caste rules for those who returned that required them to be cleansed by their village Brahmins. Anyone returning had to spend a great amount of their savings on the cleansing rituals.

These rules were implemented because East Indian indentured servants who were in the Caribbean changed in terms of personality, language, and diet.

Their once spoken native languages had a mix of English, Pidgin, and other African languages. When they returned to India, many indentured servants ended up re-indenturing themselves to the Caribbean because they were seen as outcasts.

=== Festivals and holidays ===
Indo-Guyanese Hindus continue to observe holidays such as Diwali, Phagwah, Maha Shivratri, Hanuman Jayanti, Ram Naumi, Nauratam, Vijayadashami, Krishen Janamashtami, Radhastami, Kartik Snan, Saraswati Jayanti, Ganesh Chaturthi, Pitru Paksha, Raksha Bandhan, Guru Purnima, Kalbhairo Jayanti, Vivaha Panchami, Makar Sankranti, Tulsi Puja, Gita Jayanti, Datta Jayanti and Ratha Yatra, among others, while Indo-Guyanese Muslims observe the fast in the month of Ramadan as well as observing Eid ul-Fitr, Eid al-Adha, Shab-e-barat, Mawlid, Chaand Raat and the Islamic New Year. Indo-Guyanese Christians celebrate holidays such as New Year's, Christmas, Easter, Good Friday, Ash Wednesday, Epiphany, All Saints' Day and the Feast of Corpus Christi, among others and depending on their denomination. Through colonial influence, celebrating holidays such as Diwali, Phagwah, Eid ul-Fitr, New Year's, Christmas, and Easter, is common regardless of religious beliefs. In Guyana, Indian Arrival Day is celebrated on May 5 commemorating the first arrival of indentured servants from India to the country, on 5 May 1838. On this day, the workers arrived to work in sugar plantations. Indo-Guyanese also celebrate Guyanese national holidays such as Independence Day and Republic Day.

=== Marriage ===
There is no "preferential marriages between kin" among Indo-Guyanese, nor much significance tied to marriage outside of ones religion or caste compared to other Indian diasporic groups. The duty of parents to provide the wedding for their children demonstrated "respectability and prestige" and while children generally had some say in who they married, they looked to their parents to "arrange for the rituals and meet the necessary expenses." The wedding of the first child is generally the largest and most opulent, becoming reduced and more economized for subsequent children. Parents may exaggerate the expenses put into these weddings, which are mainly on "clothes, food and drink", and dowry depending on the family and era. Weddings are qualified by the number of people fed, and a basic meal of roti, rice and a vegetable curry is considered the bare minimum.

Among Hindus and Muslims, arranged, comparatively early marriages were common in rural areas until the modern period (early 1960s); however, they are rare now. Middle-class Indians had greater freedom in choosing a spouse, especially if the woman was a professional. As in most parts of the western world marriage now occurs later, and the family unit is smaller than in the past. Indo Guyanese families are patriarchal with an extended system, where family members assist each other, like many other groups in Guyana.

=== Cuisine ===
With the blending of cultures in the Caribbean, Indo-Caribbean dishes became one of the dominant notes throughout most of the English Caribbean, with dishes such as curry, roti and dhal bhat (dhal and rice). Indo-Guyanese snacks include sal sev (also called chicken foot due to appearance, although there is no actual meat in it), gantia, plantain chips, roasted nuts, and fried channa. Appetizers and street foods include boil and fried or curried channa as well as bara, wrap roti, pholourie, and aloo (potato) or cassava/egg ball which are served with a chutney or sour. The rotis that Indo-Guyanese typically eat are paratha, dhalpuri, sada roti, dosti roti, aloo roti, and puri. Murgatani (Mulligatawny) and rasam are popular soups in Guyana of South Indian origin. Dosa (dosay or chota) is a filled crepe that is eaten by Indo-Guyanese and is of South Indian origin as well.

The main dishes at Hindu wedding, festivals, and prayer services are known as seven curry and consist of seven vegetarian curries: aloo and channa curry, eddoes (aruwi) curry, mango curry, baigan/boulanger (balanjay) curry, katahar curry, pumpkin or kohra (fried or curried), and bhaji (made with young malabar spinach, moringa, spinach or spiny amaranth leaves) served with dhal bhat (dhal and rice) or karhi and rice. Seven curry is also served with paratha or dhalpuri roti. Individual curries of seven curry are also consumed on a daily basis by Indo-Guyanese as a main dish. Meat and seafood based main dishes include chicken, duck, goat, lamb, fish (especially hassa, gilbaka, banga mary, butterfish, houri, haimara, cuffum, cuirass, lukanani, patwa, pakoo, red snapper, as well as tinned salmon, tuna, and sardine), shrimp, crab, lobster, pork (except Muslims and some Hindus) and beef (except Hindus) curry or bunjal (a type of dried curry). Fried chicken, fish, and shrimp are also eaten as a main dish along with dhal and rice. Khichri is also a popular quick dish that was seen as a staple in the days of indentureship. In Guyana, among the Indo-Guyanese people, it is popular to eat curried or fried vegetables such as okra, eddoe, breadnut, lablab beans, pumpkin, bitter melon, drumstick, long beans, calabash, potato, ridged gourd, sponged gourd, bilimbi, cassava, cabbage, cauliflower, green banana, green papaya, chickpeas, and eggplant. Roti or dhal bhat (dhal and rice) is always served along with any curry or fried dish.

Chokhas are also a popular breakfast and lunch dish among the Indo-Guyanese and are prepared by roasting vegetables that are skinned after roasting, and then garlic, onions, and peppers are chaunkay-ed or tempered in oil and added to the mashed roasted vegetable, followed by salt. Popular chokhas include baigan/boulanger (balanjay)/eggplant, tomatoes, and coconut. Chokhas are usually served with sada roti. Fish and shrimp are also used to make chokha.

Desserts include gulab jamun, mohanbhog (parsad), gurma (gurumba), ladoo, mithai, panjeeri, jalebi, gulgula, doodhpitty, barfi, pera, halwa, gujiya (goja), roat, sirnie, falooda, badam lacha, lapsi, vermicelli (sawine), and kheer (meetha bhat/sweet rice).

Fish, meat, and rum became more common amongst the diets of East Indian indentured servants. As a result of them choosing to re-indenture themselves into Guyana, Indo-Guyanese have also adopted other dishes from other cultural groups such as stews, pepperpot, fried bake, rice and peas, ground provisions, stew chicken, bake and saltfish, sardines and bread, fried chicken, fried fish, barbecue chicken, red bean and rice, metemgee, chicken soup, cook-up rice, chow mein, lo mein, fried rice, pepper shrimp, and chicken in de' ruff. Guyanese breads, pastries, cakes, and frozen treats are also popular among Indo-Guyanese, such as patties, pine tart, butterflap, tennis roll, fried bake, cassava bread, plait bread, cheese roll, black bean (chiney) cake, cassava or pumpkin pone, salara, coconut buns, black cake (rum cake), lime cookies, custard, fudge, snow cone, ice cream, and custard block (ice block).

=== Entertainment ===
Bollywood movies and songs have had an impact upon the Guyanese pop culture since the early 1950s. Many Bollywood stars have visited and performed in Guyana like megastars Shah Rukh Khan, Juhi Chawla, and Preity Zinta, also very popular singers such as Sonu Nigam, Asha Bhosle, Alka Yagnik, Shreya Ghoshal, Udit Narayan, Sunidhi Chauhan, Kumar Sanu, Hari Om Sharan, and Anup Jalota have had very successful shows in Guyana. In 1980, Lata Mangeshkar was greeted with crowds of fans and was presented with the key of the city of Georgetown, Guyana on her visit. Indian soap operas, dance, and music shows have recently grown in popularity in Guyana due to channels such as Zee TV, StarPlus, Sony Entertainment Television, and Colors TV. The most popular genres of music among Indo-Guyanese people include chutney, chutney soca, baithak gana, bhajan, Bollywood, Indian classical music, Indian folk music, soca, calypso, reggae, and dancehall. Popular local Indo-Caribbean singers include Sundar Popo, Terry Gajraj, Ramdew Chaitoe, Dropati, Ravi Bissambhar, Rakesh Yankaran, Rikki Jai, Drupatee Ramgoonai, and Babla & Kanchan. Indian instrumental influence can be seen in Guyana through the use of the tabla, harmonium, dholak, dhantal, manjira, sitar, khartal, and tassa drums.

=== Literature ===
Indo-Guyanese literature includes novels, poetry, plays and other forms written by people born or strongly affiliated with Guyana, who are descendants of indentured Indian servants. As a former British colony, English language and style had an enduring impact on the writings from Guyana, which are done in English language and utilizing Guyanese Creole. Notable writers include Joseph Ruhomon, Gaiutra Bahadur, Mahadai Das, Rajkumari Singh, and Shana Yardan.

== Return to India ==
After India gained its independence in 1947, many labourers of Indian origin in British Guiana and other Caribbean colonies like Trinidad and Tobago and Jamaica wanted to return to India. In particular, some returned for religious reasons, including the spiritual importance of the Ganges River and other Hindu pilgrimage sites. Among the returnees were people who had lived in the Caribbean for over 60 years, with family and grandchildren born abroad. Of these countries, only British Guiana chartered a ship for the returnees.

The Indo-Guyanese who remained in India settled in villages and in cities like Prayagraj, Varanasi, Lucknow, Kanpur, Basti, Gorakhpur, Azamgarh, Ballia, Chhapra, Faizabad, Patna, Chennai, Visakhapatnam, and Kolkata.

== See also ==
- Women in Guyana
- Guyana–India relations
- Indian indenture system
- Indo-Caribbean
- Hinduism in Guyana
- British Indo-Caribbean community
- Indo-Caribbean Americans
- Non-resident Indian and person of Indian origin
