= India–Suriname relations =

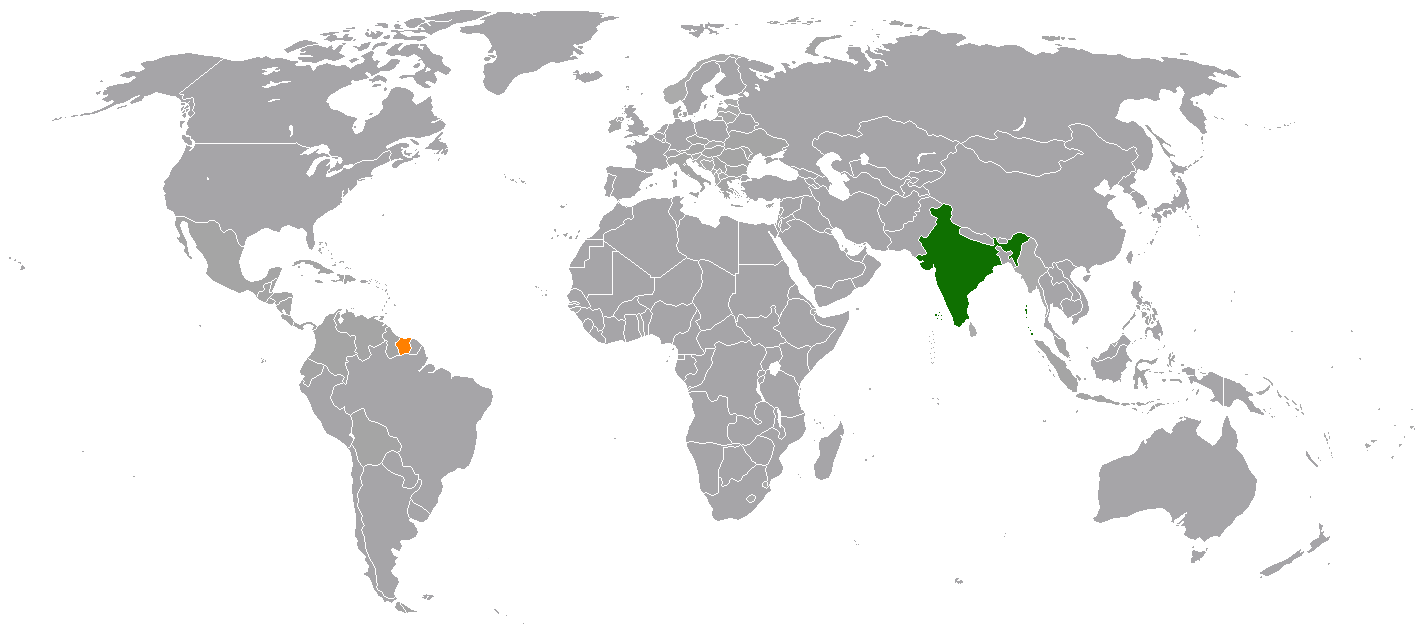
- India: Suriname

India–Suriname relations are the international relations that exist between India and Suriname. Indo-Surinamese form the largest ethnic group in Suriname, making 27.4% of the population. The current President of Suriname Chan Santokhi is of Indo-Surinamese descent.

== History ==
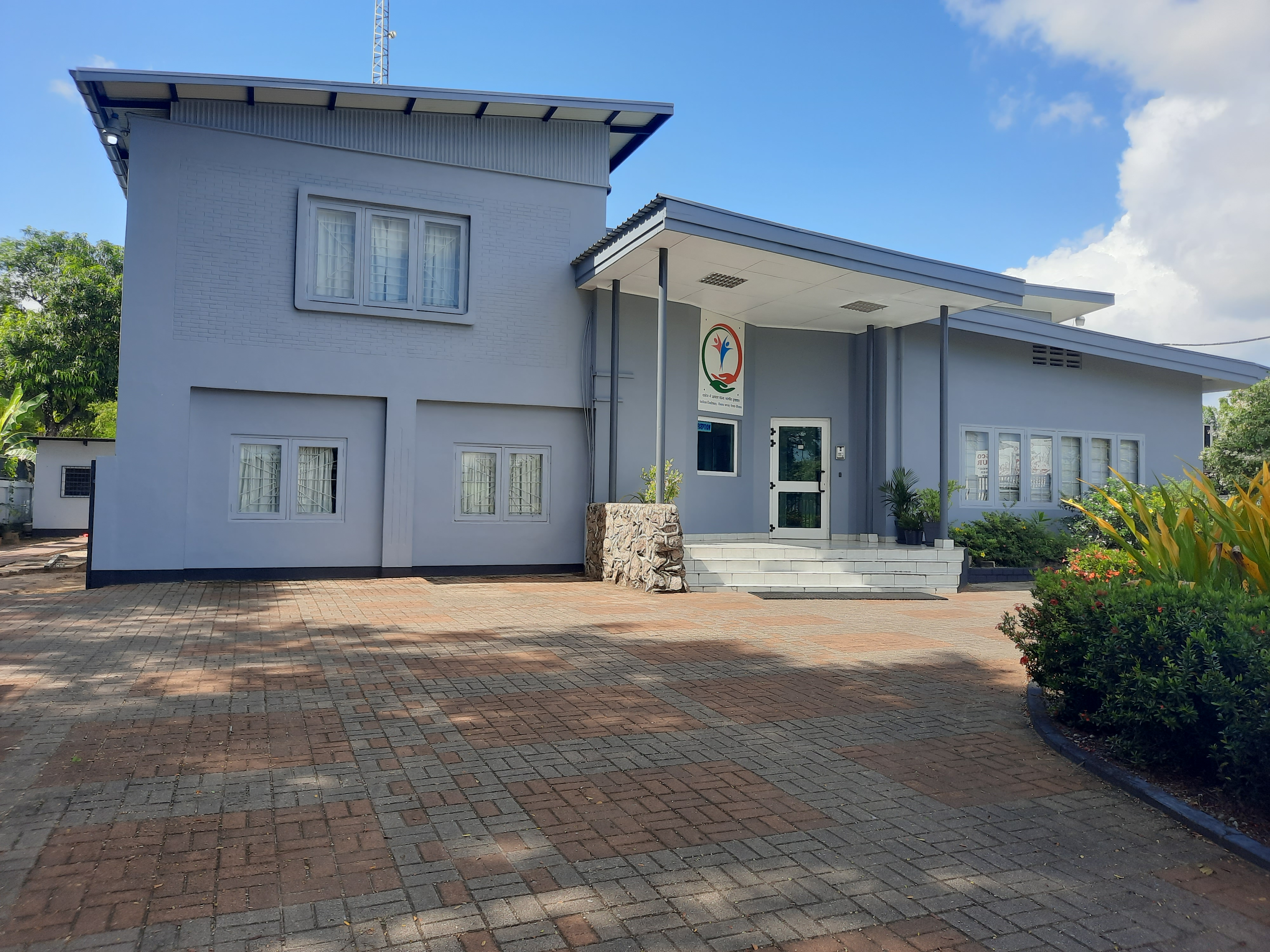
Embassy of India in Paramaribo

India and Suriname established diplomatic relations in 1976. India opened its embassy in Paramaribo in 1977, and Suriname opened its embassy in New Delhi in 2000. Suriname also has an honorary consul in Bangalore.

The Suriname-India Joint Commission to strengthen cooperation between the public and private sectors of both countries was established in September 1992. Since 1998, Suriname has supported India's candidature for a permanent seat in the United Nations Security Council.

Suriname President R.R. Venetiaan visited India from 16 to 20 March 2003. During the visit, Venetiaan met with Indian President A.P.J. Kalam and Prime Minister Atal Bihari Vajpayee, and the two countries signed agreements on co-operation in agriculture, establishment of a Cultural Exchange Programme (CEP) and the extension of $10 million line of credit from India to Suriname.

Since 1 March 2016, Indian citizens can avail visa on arrival when visiting Suriname.

== Economic relations ==
Bilateral trade between India and Suriname totaled US$228.49 million in 2014–15. The main commodities exported from India to Suriname are boilers, machinery, iron and steel, electrical machinery and equipment, sound recorders, pharmaceutical products, textiles, vehicles, coffee, tea and spices, rubber, paper, tobacco, organic chemicals, furniture, carpets, ceramic products, footwear and printed books. The main commodities exported from Suriname to India are wood, aluminum and electrical machinery.

Exports to India

2016-17 US$ 45.92 million

2017-18 US$ 92.76 million

2018-19 US$ 111.94 million

2019-20 US$55.07 million

Imports from India

2016-17 US$ 10.59 million

2017-18 US$ 17.38 million

2018-19 US$ 1.34 million

2019-20 US$ 31.12 million

== Indian foreign aid ==
India has extended multiple lines of credit (LOC) to Suriname. In 1992, the first LOC provided ₹5 crore (equivalent to ₹42 crore or US$4.4 million in 2026). An LOC extended worth US$10 million extended in 2003 was utilized to renovate water pumping stations, establish a steel rolling mill and for supply of 14 heavy hydraulic excavators. A third LOC granted $16 million to the Suriname Electricity Board to construct a 161 KV, 55 km-long power transmission line from Paranam to Paramaribo. India also supplied bulldozers, trucks, excavators, communication equipment and solar lanterns to Suriname. A fourth LOC worth $10.4 million was granted to the Ministry of Public Works of Suriname to complete establish pumping stations. Other LOCs include a US$4.3 million grant of fire tenders manufactured by BEML India, and coastal equipment network worth $2.946 million from BEL.

In March 2015, India transferred 3 HAL Chetak helicopters worth $13.5 million to the Surinamese military. A grant of $311,567 was provided to upgrade the morgue of the Lands Hospital in Paramaribo, and sum $169,400 was donated to the Institute for Natural Resources and Engineering Studies (NATIN) of Suriname under India's Grant-in-Aid to Latin American and Caribbean region programme. India announced a $50 million grant of aid to Suriname at 5th Joint Commission meeting between the two countries.

Citizens of Suriname are eligible for scholarships under the Indian Technical and Economic Cooperation Programme and the Indian Council for Cultural Relations.

== Cultural relations ==
The Indian Cultural Centre was established in Suriname in 1978. The Centre provides training in Hindi, Kathak, yoga and Indian classical music. As of December 2016, there are approximately 80 voluntary Hindi schools in the country.

Baithak Gana is a form of music originating from the Indo-Surinamese community. Baithak is a social gathering. It is a mix of Bhojpuri folk songs with other Caribbean influences. It is similar to Chutney music that originated in Trinidad and Tobago. Popular exponents of the genre include Ramdew Chaitoe, Dropati, and Desi Raghosing.

== Indians in Suriname ==
Indo-Surinamese are the largest ethnic group in Suriname, forming 27.4% of the total population. Per the 2012 Census of Suriname, 148,443 citizens of Suriname are of Indian origin. Indo-Surinamese made up 37.6% of the population in the 1972 Census. Just before and following the independence of Suriname on 25 November 1975, many Indo-Surinamese emigrated to the Netherlands, resulting in a decline in the population of the Indian community in Suriname.

During the British Raj, many Indians were sent to other British colonies for work. After the abolition of slavery in the Dutch colony of Suriname, the Dutch government signed a treaty with the United Kingdom on the recruitment of contract workers. Indians began migrating to Suriname in 1873 as indentured labourers, mostly from the modern-day Indian states of Uttar Pradesh, Bihar, and the surrounding regions.

Due to the presence of a large Indian-origin community in Suriname, nearly 400 applications for Overseas Citizenship of India are made by Surinamese citizens every year.

== Vice President Adhin of Suriname ==
=== Foreign policy ===
==== Relations with India ====
On January 9, 2017, Vice President Ashwin Adhin met with the Prime Minister of India, Narendra Modi, in Bengaluru, India, where they discussed strengthening the economic and technological bilateral cooperation between both states. Adhin emphasized that Suriname has a lot of potential in the areas of agriculture, animal husbandry, palm oil, wood processing, besides those in the extractive industries (gold, crude oil and bauxite). Adhin's plans are to set up a chair on Ayurveda at the University of Suriname and National Institute for Natural and Holistic Therapies in collaboration with India. His plans include setting up medicinal plantations, research laboratories, factories to manufacture Ayurveda products for the Surinamese market and expanding to also cover the Latin American countries and Caribbean Islands. This vision of Adhin supports efforts to diversify the Surinamese economy but also the governments approach to make healthcare the most important priority. This latter is also emphasized by the Governments Health in All Policies (HIAP) programme.

As a young accomplished individual of Indian origin, Adhin was invited to India as keynote speaker at the Youth Privasi Bharatiya Divas Convention held on January 7, 2016, which was part of the annual Privasi Bharatiya Divas (PBD) Convention, a global platform for Indian Diaspora held from 8–9 January 2017 in Bengaluru, the capital of the state of Karnataka.

Adhin backed India's decision to revoke Article 370 relating to Jammu and Kashmir.
