= Fatel Razack =

19th century ship

Fatel Razack (Fath Al Razack, Victory of God (Allah) the Provider, Arabic: قتح الرزاق) was the first ship to bring indentured labourers from India to Trinidad. The ship was built in Aprenade for a trader named Ibrahim Bin Yussef, an Indian Muslim merchant in Bombay. It was constructed from teak and had a carrying capacity of 415 tons. When the British decided they were going to bring Indians to Trinidad in 1845, most of the traditional British ship owners did not wish to be involved. The confusion as to the proper name possibly stems from the name "Futtle Razak", which was on the ship's manifest.

The ship was originally named Cecrops, but upon delivery it was renamed to Fath Al Razack. The ship left Calcutta on 16 February 1845 and landed in the Gulf of Paria on 30 May 1845, with 225 immigrants. The day of landing has been celebrated as Indian Arrival Day since the 140th anniversary of their arrival in 1845.
