= George Hindori =

Surinamese politician

Personal details
- Born: George Dewendrepersad Hindori; 13 August 1933 Paramaribo, Suriname
- Died: 26 January 1986 (aged 52) Suriname
- Party: Progressive Reform Party
- Occupation: Politician

George Dewendrepersad Hindori (August 13, 1933 – January 26, 1986) was a Surinamese politician.

== Biography ==
Hindori was born into a Brahmin family in Paramaribo. His parents were Premda and Boedhram Hindori, and he was of Indo-Surinamese descent.

Hindori served in Suriname's parliament. In the run-up to independence for Suriname in 1975, he was the second in command of the Progressive Reform Party, led by Jagernath Lachmon. That party was the main opponent of immediate independence from the Netherlands. Following a trip to the Netherlands, Hindori switched his position, favoring immediate independence, and broke with the Progressive Reform Party. He then backed the independence policies of Prime Minister Henck Arron.

After initially opposing independence, his decision to switch and support the Suriname independence movement gave the movement enough votes to secure independence from the Netherlands. His change of position has been described in terms ranging from "brave, conscientious and nationalistic, to opportunistic or even 'bribed'". He held the position of Permanent Secretary in the Ministry of Agriculture.
