= Alice Bhagwandai Singh =

Surinamese-Guyanese activist, feminist and community organizer (1891–1970)

- Born: Alice Bhagwandai Sital Persaud; 22 April 1891; Paramaribo, Surinam (present-day Suriname)
- Died: 2 November 1970 (aged 79)
- Spouse: Jung Bahadur Singh (1910 -)
- Children: 7; Rajkumari Singh

Alice Bhagwandai Singh (née Alice Bhagwandai Sital Persaud; 22 April 1891 – 2 November 1970) was a Surinamese-Guyanese activist, feminist, and community organizer. She was the first Caribbean woman of Indian descent to write an autobiography about her family's immigration to the region.

== Early life ==
Singh was born to a Indo-Surinamese family in the Dutch colony of Suriname, and raised in the capital, Paramaribo. Her paternal grandmother, Phularjee, was a Brahmin originally from Bengal and the daughter of a Hindu priest and widow of a wealthy landowner. Her father, Sital Persaud, who immigrated along with his mother, was a community leader and organizer and was a role model to her as she grew up. Mary, her mother, grew up in Suriname in a middle-class Christian Indian family assimilated into the Dutch colonial culture. Mary defied her family's expectations to marry Singh's father, a Hindu who was an immigrant and from a family deeply rooted in their Indian culture. She had two brothers and a sister. Singh grew up speaking Sarnami Hindustani at home, and was educated at a nearby convent.

While working as a typist at the Government Immigration Office, Singh met Jung Bahadur Singh. They married on 23 February 1910, in Paramaribo in both a civil, Christian, and Hindu ceremony, and subsequently moved to British Guiana.

== Organizing and career ==
In June 1927, Singh established the East Indian Ladies' Guild (EILG), which was a charitable organization.

In 1934, her husband established the British Guiana Sanatan Dharma Maha Sabha, a Hindu religious organization, which Singh helped to support; she also co-founded a women's branch of the organization, called Sanatan Dharma Maha Lakshmi Sabha.

The British Guiana Dramatic Society (BGDS) was inaugurated at her home on 10 March 1937. Singh served as the society's first president and directed several of their plays. The society put on annual public performances, usually in May, which were often plays written by Indian playwrights and/or drawing on Indian history and mythology.

Singh was also involved in the Commonwealth Heart and Chest Association, the Girl Guides, the Red Cross, the St. John's Ambulance Brigade, the Tuberculosis Society, the Women's League of Social Services (of which she was a founding member), and the YWCA. She also founded the Balak Sahaita Mandalee (BSM) in 1936, which served poor Indian women and their children.

Singh also worked in government positions. She was appointed by the government to be a board member of the Poor Law Commission, where she helped process applications and run interviews for welfare recipients. She was also appointed to the Prison Commissioners, where she helped ensure inmates were treated humanely.

In 1950, she received the Most Excellent Order of the British Empire in honor of her social organizing work.

== Writing ==
In her later years, Singh was convinced by one of her sons, Hardutt, to write an autobiography.

== Personal life ==
Singh had four daughters and three sons with her husband. One of her daughters, Rajkumari Singh, was an activist and writer in her own right.
