= Indo-Surinamese =

Surinamese people with ancestry from the Indian subcontinent

Hindo(e)staanse Surinamers (Dutch) हिंदुस्तानी सरनामी • ہندوستانی سرینامیز (Sarnami)
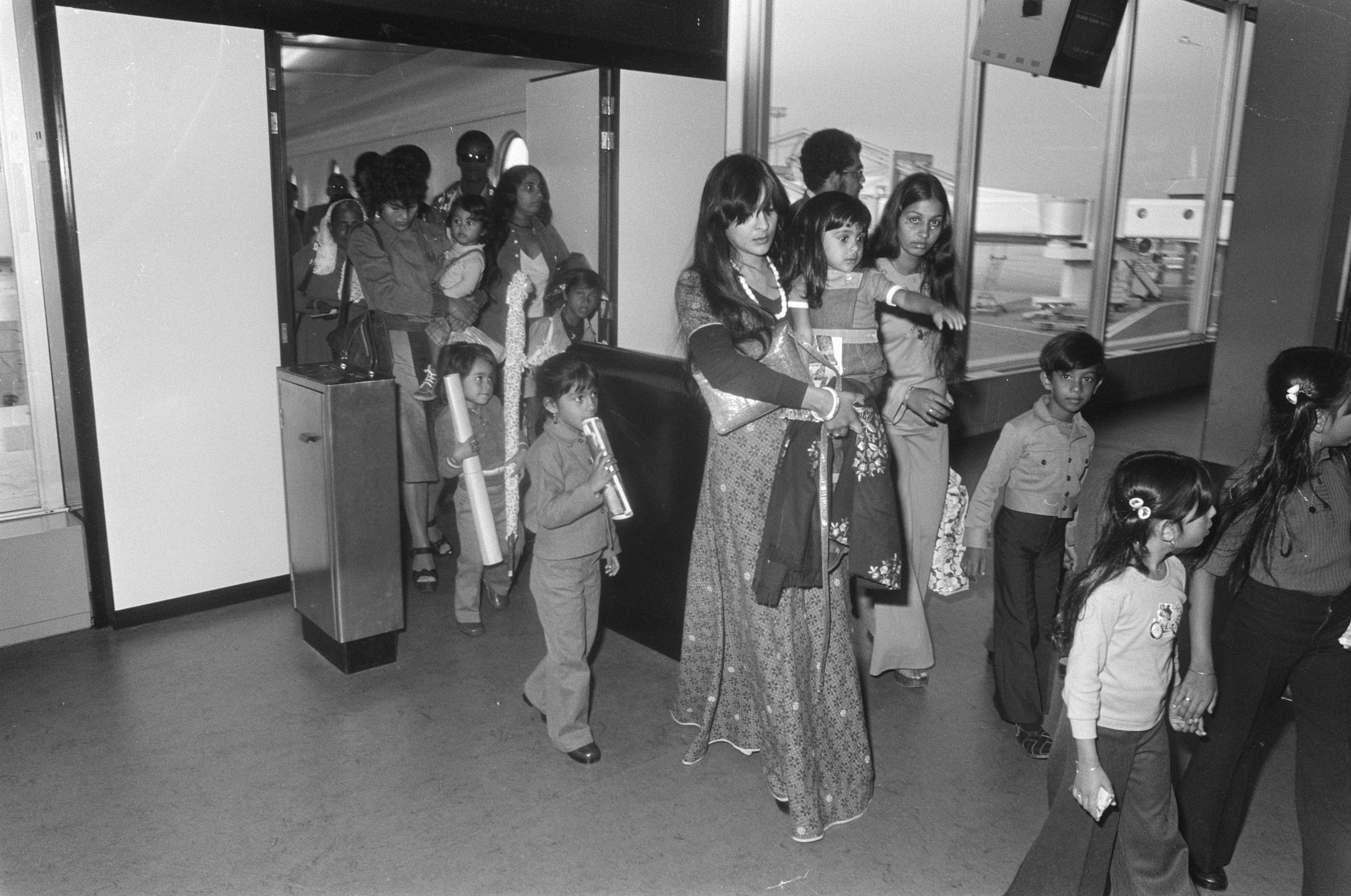
- Last flight from Suriname at Schiphol Airport, welcoming Indo-Surinamese people at the airport on November 24, 1975

Total population
- 348,443

Regions with significant populations
- Netherlands: 200,000
- Suriname: 148,443

Languages
- Sarnami Hindustani, Dutch, English, Sranan Tongo

Religion
- Majority: Hinduism; Minority: Islam, Christianity, Irreligion and Others

Related ethnic groups
- Indo-Caribbean people, Indian people, Indian diaspora, Indians in the Netherlands, Surinamese in the Netherlands, Indo-Caribbean Americans, Indo-Caribbean Canadians, British Indo-Caribbean people, Indo-Guyanese, Indo-Trinidadians and Tobagonians, Indo-Jamaicans, Indo-Fijians, Indo-Mauritians, Indo-South Africans, Bihari-U.P. diaspora, South Asian diaspora

Indo-Surinamese, Indian-Surinamese, or Hindustani Surinamese are nationals of Suriname who trace their ancestry to India and the wider subcontinent. Their ancestors were indentured labourers, mostly from the Bhojpur and Awadh regions of the Hindi Belt in Northern India, who were brought by the Dutch and the British to the Dutch colony of Suriname, beginning in 1873 and continuing during the British Raj. Per the 2012 Census of Suriname, 148,443 citizens of Suriname are of Indo-Surinamese origin, constituting 27.4% of the total population, making them the largest ethnic group in Suriname on an individual level. They are a subgroup of Asian Surinamese and Indo-Caribbean people.

== Etymology ==
Indo-Surinamese are also known locally by the Dutch term Hindoestanen (Dutch pronunciation: [ˌɦɪnduˈstaːnə(n)]), derived from the word Hindustani, lit., "someone from Hindustan". Hence, when Indians migrated to Suriname they were referred to as Hindustanis, people of Indian origin. Since 1947 the official name for the ethnic group in Suriname has been Hindostanen (“Hindostanis”). As the term Hindoestanen was mostly associated with followers of Hinduism, Hindostanen also includes the Muslim and Christian followers among the Indian immigrants in Suriname. Nowadays the term Hindoestanen and Hindostanen are interchangeably used in common Dutch language, and with that the meaning of Hindoestanen came to be more inclusive. They were also known as kantraki or girmityas, terms referring to the agreements that the labourers had to sign regarding the work and the period of stay, and meaning "Someone with an Agreement."

== History ==
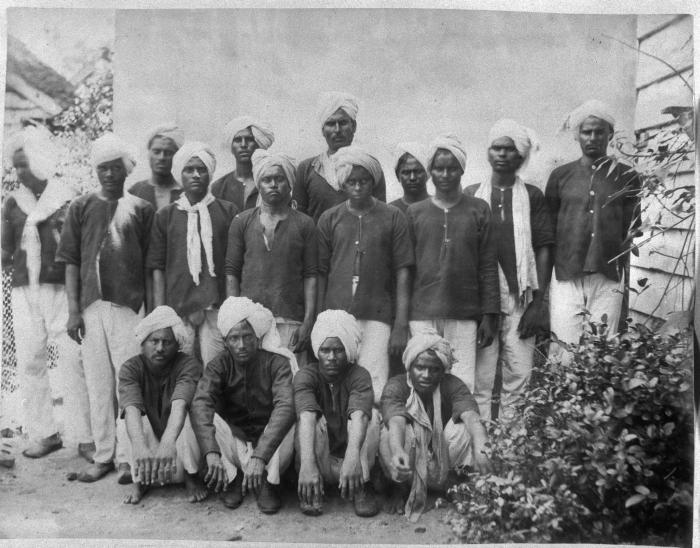
Indian indentured labourers

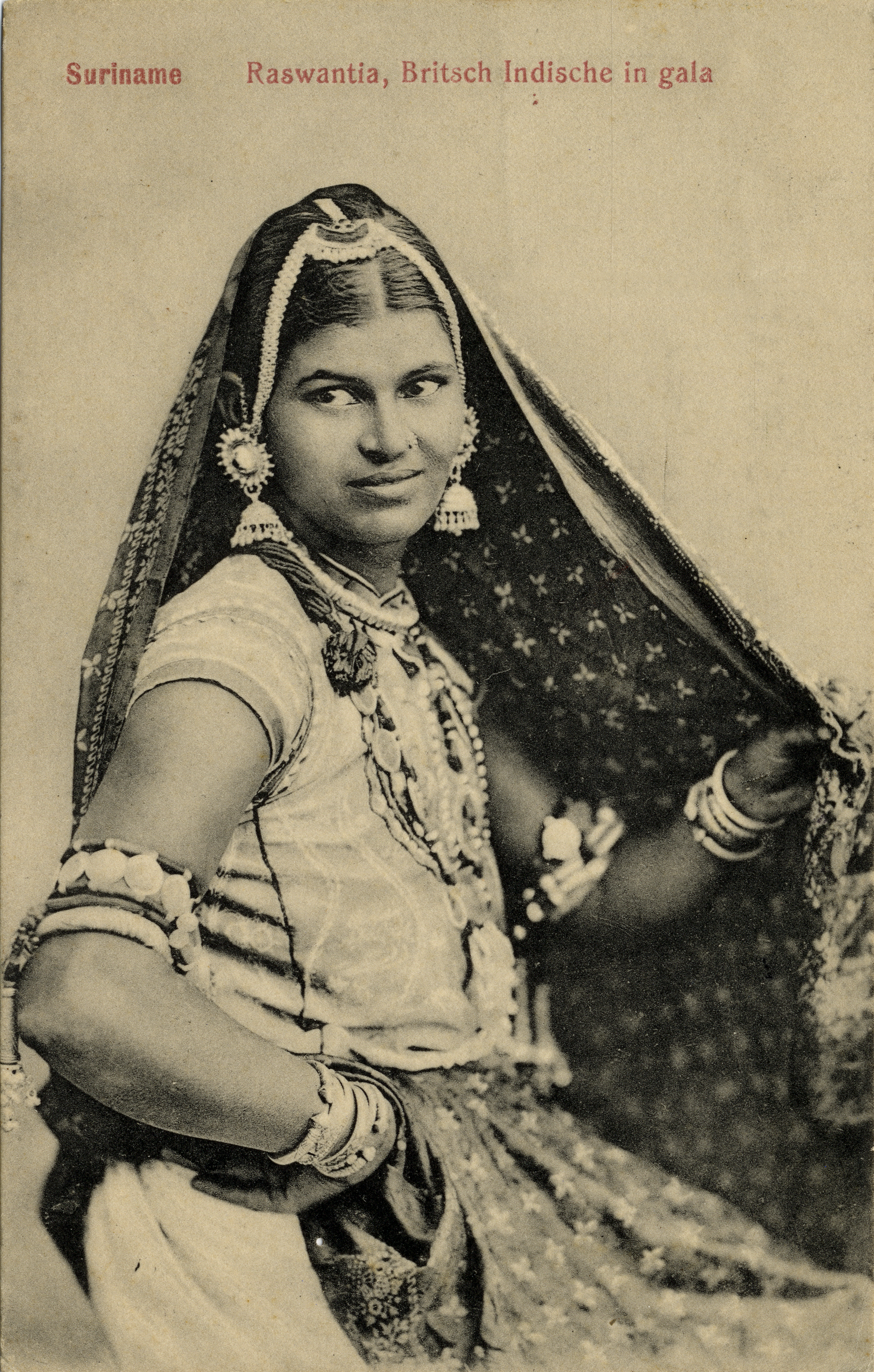
Raswantia, an Indian woman posing for a postcard portrait in the early 20th century in Suriname

During the British Raj, many Indians were sent to other British colonies for work. After the abolition of slavery in the Dutch colony of Suriname, the Dutch government signed a treaty with the United Kingdom on the recruitment of contract workers. Indians began migrating to Suriname in 1873 from what was then British India as indentured labourers, Mostly from the Northern part consisting of modern-day Uttar Pradesh, Bihar and Bengal and in smaller numbers Haryana, Punjab and Tamil Nadu. However, among the immigrants there were also labourers from other parts of South Asia, such as present-day Afghanistan, Bangladesh and Nepal.

The first ship transporting Indian indentured labourers, the Lalla Rookh, arrived in Paramaribo. Newly freed slaves in Suriname who witnessed Indian workers disembarking at the harbour, reportedly stated, "Jobo tanbasi", meaning "The white man is still the boss", suggesting that they viewed the development as a continuation of the slave trade. Initially, the transport and living conditions of Indian labourers in Suriname was worse than it had been prior to the abolition of the Dutch slave trade. The British Viceroy of India described it as "a new system of slavery". In 1870s, conditions were improved greatly following the passage of new legislation to protect the Indian workers. The Government of the United Kingdom and the colonial British Government in India feared comparisons to slavery would hurt their reputation, and enacted several legislations to make transportation of Indian workers safer and improve working conditions in plantations. The Dutch government, which had signed the agreement to recruit workers with the British after long and difficult negotiations, also feared jeopardizing the arrangement and meticulously followed the regulations imposed by the British. The Dutch were also concerned that they would be accused of reviving the slave trade.

In order to reduce the mortality rate among workers being transported from India, the colonial British government required the presence of at least one doctor on every ship. As regulations required the doctor to be of European-origin, the regulations also required that one Indian indentured labourer be appointed as a translator and that he would be paid for his services at the end of the journey. Other regulations mandated that every ship have distilling apparatus with a capacity to produce at least 500 litres of drinking water from seawater daily, and also required ships to have a sickbay, male and female nursing staff, adequate food and medicine, and artificial ventilation in the passengers' quarters. Another regulation prohibited any ship transporting Indian indentured labourers from setting sail between the end of March and the beginning of August. Any shipping company that violated the regulations would be prohibited from transporting contact workers in the future. While the mortality rate among slaves working on plantations between 1680 and 1807 averaged 50.9 per thousand people, following the passage of the regulations post-1873, it dropped to 7.1 per thousand among Indian workers.

Indo-Surinamese made up 37.6% of the population in the 1972 Census. Following the independence of Suriname on 25 November 1975, a significant portion of the Indo-Surinamese population migrated to the Netherlands, thereby retaining their Dutch passport .

== Religion ==
The majority religion among the Indo-Surinamese is Hinduism, practiced by 78% of the people, followed by Islam (13%), and Christianity (7%). Among the Hindus about 63% follow orthodox, traditional Hinduism that they call Sanātanī to differentiate themselves from the 15% who belong to the reform movement Arya Samaj, started by Dayananda Saraswati. Among the Indo-Surinamese Muslims, 75% follow Sunni Islam while 25% identify as Ahmadiyya, of either the Lahore Ahmadiyya Movement for the Propagation of Islam or the Ahmadiyya Muslim Community community.

== Notable Indo-Surinamese people ==
- Ashwin Adhin, politician, former Vice President of Suriname
- Errol Alibux, politician, former prime minister of Suriname, suspect in the December murders trial
- Robert Ameerali, politician
- Kiran Badloe, windsurfer
- Soerdj Badrising, politician
- Kiran Bechan, football player
- Paul Bhagwandas Military officer, Football Coach, Suspect of December Murder 1982
- Diego Biseswar, football player
- Cándani, poet, writer, and painter
- Danilho Doekhi, football player
- George Hindori, politician
- Tanja Jadnanansing, Dutch Labour Party politician
- Ricardo Kishna, football player
- Ismene Krishnadath, writer
- Darryl Lachman, football player
- Jagernath Lachmon, politician, ex-Speaker of the National Assembly of Suriname
- Immanuel Pherai, football player
- Vinoodh Matadin, fashion photographer
- Fred Ramdat Misier, politician
- Raj Mohan, singer
- Furdjel Narsingh, football player
- Luciano Narsingh, Dutch footballer
- Joël Piroe, football player
- Prem Radhakishun, lawyer, columnist, actor and radio and television producer
- Pretaap Radhakishun, former Prime Minister of Suriname
- Anil Ramdas, columnist, correspondent, essayist, journalist, and TV and radio host
- Chan Santokhi, President of Suriname, ex-chief of police, Progressive Reform Party politician
- India Sardjoe, Dutch breakdancer
- Ram Sardjoe, politician, ex-Speaker of the National Assembly of Suriname
- Ramsewak Shankar, politician
- Alice Bhagwandai Singh, Surinamese-Guyanese activist
- Aron Winter, football player

== See also ==
- Prawas Din
  - Indian Arrival Day
- Hinduism in Suriname
  - Arya Samaj in Suriname
- Islam in Suriname
- Chutney music
  - Baithak Gana
- Surinamese Immigrants' Association
- Indians in the Netherlands
- Indo-Caribbean
  - Indo-Guyanese
- Lalla Rookh Museum, a museum about the Indo-Surinamese history and culture
- Suriname-India Chamber of Commerce and Industry
- India–Suriname relations
