= Prawas Din =

Suriname holiday

- Official name: Prawas Din
- Also called: Surinamese Immigration Day
- Observed by: Hindustani-Surinamese community in the Netherlands and Suriname
- Date: 5 June
- Next time: 5 June 2025
- Frequency: Annual
- Related to: Indian Arrival Day

Prawas Din or Surinamese Immigration Day is the day that commemorates the arrival of the first Indian contract workers in Suriname on June 5, 1873, on the Lalla Rookh. The commemoration takes place on June 5.

== See also ==
- Indian Arrival Day
