= Rajkumari Singh =

Guyanese writer and activist (1923–1979)

Rajkumari Singh (13 October 1923 – 1979) was an Indo-Caribbean, Guyanese writer, political activist, educator, and cultural leader. She is the author of the essay "I am a Coolie". Singh was the first published Indian woman from the Caribbean and although she never used the term "feminist," her life's work contributed to feminist literature of the Caribbean, in addition to her advancement of a national Guyanese culture of integration while still upholding Indian culture within this new construct.

== Poetry ==
Her iconic poem, "Per Ajie," epitomizes the journey of Indians to the Caribbean, through the eyes of an Indo-Caribbean visualizing her paternal great-grandmother making the voyage on one of the historic migratory ships headed for Guyana. It was written in a Shakespearean style of language, in order to elevate the topic of Indian indentureship into circles of serious literary critique. Another piece, "I See Bent Figures," describes the struggles and achievements of indentured Indians laboring on plantations in the Caribbean.

Singh's work is an important part of the early Hindu Caribbean literary canon, with her poem "No More Kitchrie for the Groom" shedding light on the shared responsibility of families and communities for the well-being of daughters, and the abuse of the Hindu tradition of dowry. Another of her poems "Deepavali," is a piece documenting Diwali rituals in the Caribbean.

== Other works ==
Singh was also a dramatist whose work has been described as lively and polemical. A "critic of Indian racial chauvinism and gender oppression", she was a key member of the British Guiana Dramatic Society during the period from 1929 to 1947. Her essay "I am a Coolie" takes a word which at first connoted something negative and turns it into a concept of positive cultural identity.

In the 1970s, she founded The Messenger Group, a Guyanese literary collective created to foster and nurture Indo-Caribbean artists and writers. Those mentored within this group include Mahadai Das, Rooplall Monar, Henry Muttoo, and Gushka Kisson, among others.

Also a broadcaster on Radio Demerara, Singh wrote several radio plays and on-air programs for "Broadcast to Schools."

== Awards ==
Singh was a Wordsworth McAndrew Award Laureate (2002) and was also honored with Guyana's Arrow of Achievement (1970).

== Personal life ==
Singh hailed from and proliferated a lineage of arts and activism. Her father was Dr. Jung Bahadur Singh, OBE, a politician, doctor, and philanthropist who founded the British Guiana East Indian Association. Singh's father, and her mother, Alice Bhagwandai Singh, were co-founders of the British Guiana Dramatic Society, which produced plays with an Indo-Caribbean cast and crew. Her maternal grandfather, Seetal Prashad was a worked for Indian rights.

Singh, crippled by polio from the age of six, had eight children, and continuing the family legacy of arts and activism, her son, Karna Singh, is an author and cultural historian, and her son Gora Singh, was the Caribbean's most highly acclaimed kathak dance exponent and founder of The Rajkumari Cultural Center, a New York-based non-profit cultural organization. Her daughter, Pritha, is a dramatist and playwright, and her daughters Chitra and Radha are musicians, composers, vocalists and recording artists. Singh's granddaughter, Sharda Shakti Singh, is a playwright.

== Selected works ==
- (1960) A Garland of Stories
- (1971) Days of the Sahib : Collection of Poems
- (1972) Children Stories of Guyana : Compilation
- (1974) The Sound of Her Bells
