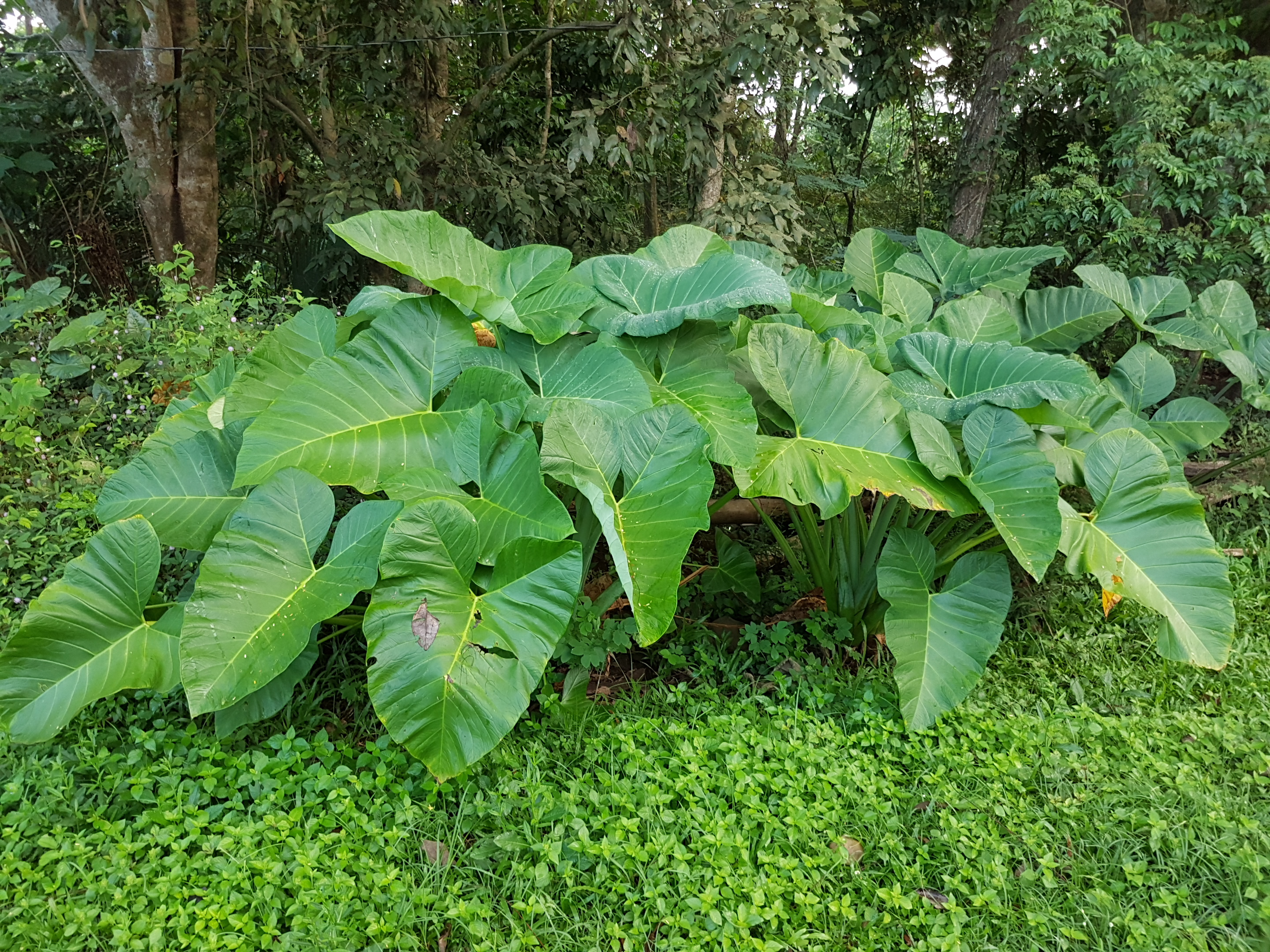
- In Bukidnon
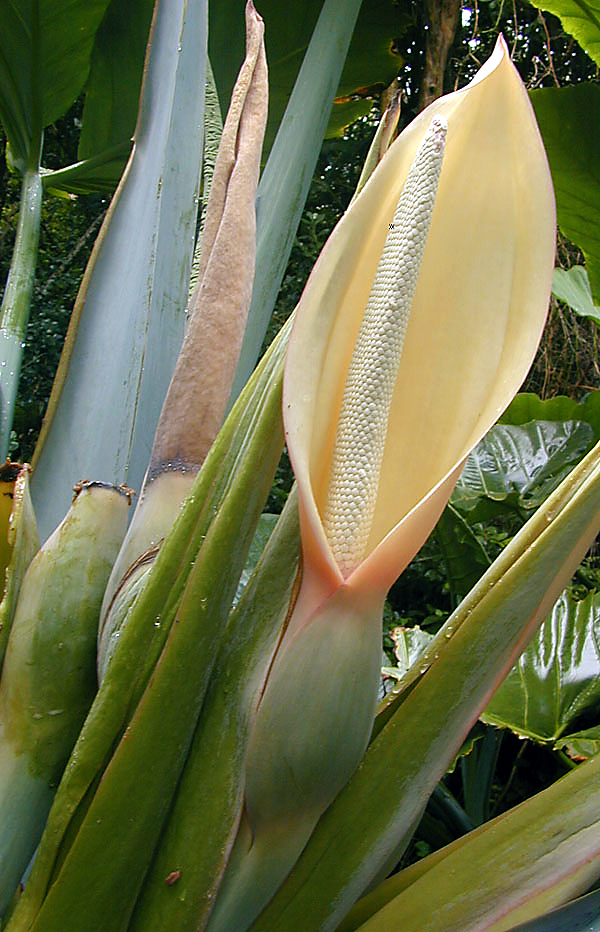
- Inflorescence

Scientific classification
- Kingdom: Plantae
- Clade: Tracheophytes
- Clade: Angiosperms
- Clade: Monocots
- Order: Alismatales
- Family: Araceae
- Genus: Xanthosoma
- Species: X. sagittifolium

Binomial name
- Xanthosoma sagittifolium (L.) Schott

Synonyms
- Alocasia talihan Elmer ex Merr.; Arum sagittifolium L.; Arum xanthorrhizon Jacq.; Caladium edule G.Mey.; Caladium mafaffa Engl.; Caladium sagittifolium (L.) Vent.; Caladium utile Engl.; Caladium xanthorrhizon (Jacq.); Xanthosoma appendiculatum Schott; Xanthosoma atrovirens K.Koch & C.D.Bouché; Xanthosoma blandum Schott; Xanthosoma edule (G.Mey.) Schott; Xanthosoma ianthinum K.Koch & C.D.Bouché; Xanthosoma jacquinii Schott; Xanthosoma mafaffa Schott; Xanthosoma nigrum Stellfeld; Xanthosoma peregrinum Griseb.; Xanthosoma poeppigii var. mafaffa (Schott) J.F.Macbr.; Xanthosoma roseum Schott; Xanthosoma utile K.Koch & C.D.Bouché; Xanthosoma violaceum Schott; Xanthosoma xantharrhizon (Jacq.) K.Koch

= Xanthosoma sagittifolium =

Species of flowering plant

Xanthosoma sagittifolium, or tannia, is a tropical flowering plant from the family Araceae. It produces an edible, starchy corm. X. sagittifolium is native to tropical America where it has been first cultivated. Around the 19th century, the plant spread to Southeast Asia and Africa and has been cultivated there ever since. X. sagittifolium is often confused with the related plant Colocasia esculenta (taro), which is similar both in appearance and its uses. Both plants are often collectively named 'cocoyam'.

Tannia is among the world’s most important tuber crops and feeds 400 million people worldwide. There are multiple varieties, the two most common being the red flesh and the white flesh variety. They were selectively bred to improve pest and disease resistance, to shorten the time it takes to reach maturity and to improve the cooking quality.

== Common names ==
Common names for X. sagittifolium include tannia, new cocoyam, arrowleaf elephant's ear, American taro, yautía, malanga, and uncucha. Cultivars with purple stems or leaves are also variously called blue taro, purplestem taro, purplestem tannia, and purple elephant's ear.

== Ecology ==
=== Diseases ===
Root rot is the most important disease in tannia. The oomycete Pythium myriotylum is probably the main causal agent of the root rot disease. Other organisms that could be involved are Phytopthora ssp., Fusarium ssp., Penicillium ssp., Botrydioplodia ssp., Erwinia ssp. and Pseudomonas ssp. Symptoms are stunted growth, wilting, chlorotic and withered leaves and a poor root system. The disease leads to low yields or even complete crop failure. The disease spreads through soil and planting material. The pathogens can persist for a long time in the soil, often forcing farmers to give up planting tannia in infected fields for at least five years. Wetland, floodings and poorly drained soils are associated with the appearance of root rot disease. As long as the field is not yet infected, the best method to control the disease is to use disease-free planting material. Further cultural control methods are general strengthening of plant health, drainage, crop rotation and planting on ridges. There are cultivars that are less susceptible to root rot, but none of them are resistant. Various fungicides are effective in case of infection.

Dasheen Mosaic Potyvirus is the most important virus that infects tannia and other aroids. Symptoms include chlorotic mosaic patterns along the veins and stunting. The Dasheen Mosaic Virus is not lethal but can reduce the yield significantly. The virus is transmitted by aphids. It can be spread vegetatively by planting material and mechanically by sap transmission while using tools. It is therefore important to use virus-free plant material and to work hygienically. The control of the vector aphids would be effective, but is difficult.

Taro leaf blight, caused by Phytophthora colocasiae, is not a problem in tannia. Some varieties of tannia even seem to be resistant against it. By contrast, in taro (Colocasia esculenta), a related and similar-looking crop plant, this is a major disease problem.

== Cultivation ==
=== Climate requirements ===
Although its exact native range is uncertain, the plant is now widely cultivated in the American tropics. This cultivation is not only for ornamental purposes but also, both privately and commercially, for its edible parts. Xanthosoma sagittifolium is an adaptable plant that grows optimally in warm and humid conditions and temperatures above 25 degrees Celsius. At lower temperatures and in arid climates, the development of the plant is hindered. For proper development, the plant needs rainfall evenly distributed throughout the year.

It is noteworthy that tannia is one of the most shade-tolerant plants, which allows successful cultivation in traditional Agroforestry systems and facilitates intercropping with perennial crops such as bananas, cocoas or oil palms.

The optimal soil conditions for the plant to thrive are well-drained, loamy soils with a pH between 5.5 and 6.5. However, Tannia can grow in various soil types, with the exception of hard clay or pure sand, but generally prefers soils high in organic matter. In general, the plant's adaptability allows it to flourish in a wide range of soils and habitats.

=== Planting ===
The best time for planting depends on the local climatic conditions of the growing region. However, it is suggested to do the planting during the rainy season and when the soil is sufficiently moist.

Small parts of the corms or cormels are used for planting. These propagating materials are typically planted at a depth of 7–10 cm, ideally with the growth bud pointing downward. Planting is done in rows half a meter to one meter apart to allow the corms and cormels to develop well and to facilitate the harvest. More dense planting leads to higher yields per field and less weeding, more space results in a higher yield per plant but more weeding work. Crop Management is done manually using simple tools such as digging sticks or bush knives.

=== Harvesting ===
The typical tannia plant has a 9 to 11 months growing cycle. During this time, it produces a large stem called a corm, which is surrounded by smaller edible cormels about the size of potatoes. Harvesting these edible aroids typically occurs when the leaves start to turn yellow. During the growth cycle, a plant typically produces approximately 40-50 leaves, which are usually harvested within a 40-50 day period.

Mature cormels can be harvested continuously over an extended period of time, often exceeding 500 days, while the primary mother plant remains in the ground to produce a new crop.

Harvesting is commonly carried out manually or with semi-mechanized equipment. After harvesting, the corms are cured to slow down the rate of physiological and pathological decay of the tuber, which would result in loss of quality. Further losses may occur due to the short shelf life of the tubers. Also storage at ambient temperatures poses a challenge.

== Nutrition ==
Tannia is an important source of starch in many African countries such as Ethiopia. Its tubers contain approximately 85% carbohydrates in dry matter. Furthermore, the protein content amounts to 10% – a benefit for the resource-poor farmers by whom Tannia is mainly consumed. The plant is also rich in vitamin A and vitamin C and a good source of potassium, calcium and other minerals.

However, the presence of calcium oxalate must be considered, a compound known to irritate mucous membranes, resulting in crystalline deposits commonly referred to as crystal sand. Consumption of these corms can lead to a scratchy sensation in the mouth and throat. To mitigate this effect, the corms need to be boiled before consumption, as this process allows the substances to dissolve in the cooking water, making the corms safe to eat.

== Uses ==
=== Culinary ===
Tannia is a versatile crop with both its corm and leaves suitable for human consumption. The corms can be categorized into smaller secondary corms and main corms. Secondary corms are primarily used in various culinary applications, in similar ways as potatoes. They can be boiled, fried, roasted, steamed, baked, or ground into flour. The leaves of the tannia plant find common culinary use as a leafy green, similar to spinach. In contrast, primary corms are typically designated for animal feed rather than human consumption because of the higher amount of oxalates.

In Bolivia, it is called walusa, in Colombia bore, in Costa Rica tiquizque or macal, in Cuba malanga, in Mexico mafafa, in Nicaragua quequisque, in Panama otoe, in Dominican cuisine is called yautía, yautía morada, and yautía coco and ocumo in Venezuela. In Brazil, the leaves are sold as taioba. The tuber (called nampi or malanga) is also used in the cuisine of these countries. The plant is often interplanted within reforestation areas to control weeds and provide shade during the early stages of growth.

In Puerto Rican cuisine, the plant and its corm are called yautía. In Puerto Rico pasteles, yautía is ground with squash, potato, green bananas and plantains into a dough-like fluid paste containing of a thick stew of pork, ham, olives, chickpeas, raisins, capers, and boiled in a banana leaf or paper wrapper. The yautía corm is used in stews, soups, or simply served boiled much like a potato. In Puerto Rico it is used in local dishes such as guanime, alcapurrias, sancocho, and mondongo. In alcapurrias, it is also ground with green bananas and made into fried croquettes containing picadillo or seafood. Yautía majada is also prepared and consumed when mashed in some instances. Yautía puree is usually served with fish or shellfish cooked in coconut milk. Asopao de gandules is a thick pigeon pea soup made with pork and dumplings made from yautía and green banana paste.

In Suriname and the Netherlands, the plant is called tayer. The shredded root is baked with chicken, fruit juices, salted meat, and spices in the popular Surinamese dish, pom. Eaten over rice or on bread, pom is commonly eaten in Suriname at family gatherings and on special occasions, and is also popular throughout the Netherlands. In Surinamese cuisine the leaves are also often baked with a Maggi-cube (chicken boullion cube) and eaten alongside rice and chicken or salted beef.

=== Flour ===
Flour can be made by slicing the rhizome and then drying it. Afterwards, it can be finely ground. The yield of the starch is about 15%. A big problem of tannia is the low storability because of the high moisture content of the corms and cormels. Processing the tubers into flour could increase the storability of the crop and could increase the added value. Local farmers then would be able to sell their crop for a higher price, which could then help the local community. Especially the white fleshed variety provides flour that has qualities that are great for making bread, since the resulting paste is not as cohesive and can therefore be used for the preparation of different foods. Flour could also easily be used in meat and milk products. A disadvantage of the flour is the (especially in comparison with flour made from cassava) lower starch content and it therefore would be best to only make flour as a byproduct of other processes. It could also be made from cormels that do not provide the necessary quality for cooking.

=== Chicken feed ===
Studies have shown that it is possible to replace up to 45% of the maize grain in chicken feed with tannia corm meal (TCM). This could be useful for farmers since chicken feed which consists of maize grains is very expensive, especially in poorer countries. At the beginning of their growing phase, chickens fed with TCM consume significantly more because TCM reduces the nutrient uptake and weight gain. Later in the growing stage, this effect diminishes and in the end, there is no difference in the weight of chickens fed with TCM in comparison to chickens fed entirely with maize grains.

=== Other uses ===
Tannia is used by some populations as a medicine against tarantula, scorpion and snake bites. Studies with rats have shown that tannia leaves could protect from cardiovascular diseases and bowel cancer. Other benefits include a reduced weight gain, reduced liver fat, increased fecal mass and higher concentration of short chain fatty acids and bile salt. It has also shown a probiotic effect. Another study has shown that tannia can stop the cell cycle and force apoptosis in a cancer cell. Tannia also has been traditionally used to treat osteoporosis because of the high content of free calcium analyses. Studies have shown that the usage of tannia indeed is a feasible option for treatment for poorer communities without access to proper medication.

Cocoa trees can grow in direct sunlight, but in some climates, the intense light in the afternoon can damage the leaves. Tannia has many leaves which makes it a good candidate for a cover crop that can protect the cocoa plant from direct sunlight. Another advantage of Tannia is that it can grow in many different climates and therefore would be suitable for many different countries.

Tannia could also be used to make food preservatives (lactic acid), energy bars, chips and crisps, additives in beverages, sauce thickeners, purees, and sauces.

There is also a possibility of using tannia to make ethanol for biofuel because of the high starch content and the high yield.
