= Pom (dish) =

Root vegetable baked dish

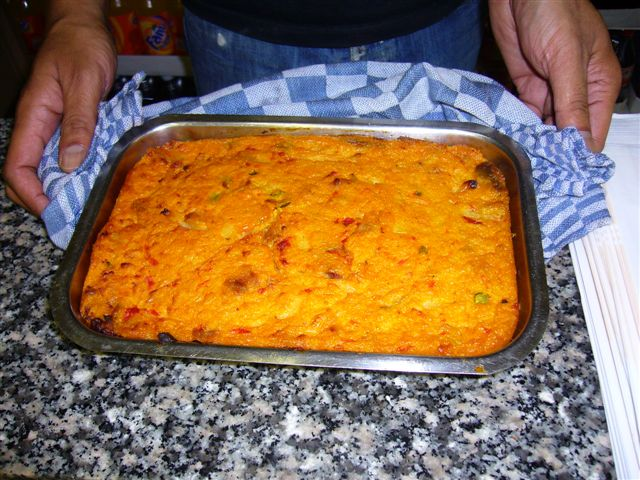
- Alternative names: Pomtajer
- Type: Casserole
- Place of origin: Suriname
- Main ingredients: Arrowleaf elephant ear root, citrus juice, chicken

Pom is a Surinamese oven dish made using arrowleaf elephant ear root, locally called "pomtajer".

== History ==
Within the Surinamese community, in both Suriname and the Netherlands, pom is the most popular and best-known festive dish.

Within the Surinamese community pom is frequently referred to as a dish of Creole or Jewish origin. It was introduced by the Portuguese–Jewish plantation owners as the Portuguese potato ("pomme de terre") oven dish. Because the potato did not grow in Suriname and had to be imported, it was soon replaced with the root of the tayer plant. Pom combines three central ingredients: chicken, citrus juice and pomtajer (Xanthosoma sagittifolium). Only the latter is indigenous, and although all plant parts are edible, only the underground part of the main stem is used as an ingredient in preparing pom. The main stem or corm is most frequently designated as pomtajer or pongtaya (lit. the tajer/taya for pom).

The first published description of pom comes from the Encyclopedie van Nederlandsch West-Indië (1914–1917) which describes the dish as follows: ‘the big tajer, of which the stalk grows above the earth, is grated and treated with the juice of bitter oranges, afterwards with chicken or fish, made into a pie, which dish is known as pom.’

The basic preparation method is sautéed chicken pieces between two layers of raw, grated pomtajer, mixed with citrus juice and a sauce made from oil or margarine, onions, tomatoes, salt, pepper and nutmeg, baked in an oven until the pom becomes golden brown.

In Amsterdam alone there are over 120 establishments serving Surinamese food. Other Dutch cities such as Rotterdam and The Hague have a growing number of caterers, eateries and take-aways. Most establishments serve pom, and often also “broodje pom” (pom on a bread roll), a derivation of the national dish. In particular, “broodje pom” is rapidly gaining popularity and starting to appear on the Dutch menu. It can sometimes even be ordered in Dutch take-aways and for home delivery. In recent years, more and more recipes for pom have appeared in Dutch cookbooks, newspapers and on websites. In 2007, an exhibition about pom was held at Imagine Identity and Culture, an Amsterdam-based centre for the representation of migration and cultures as seen from their own perspective.
