= Dropati =

- Origin: Suriname
- Genres: Baithak Gana

Dropati is a Surinamese musician. Considered by many to be the mother of modern-day Baithak Gana, she was introduced to the Indian music industry in the Caribbean by way of her album Let's Sing and Dance. Produced in 1968, the album includes wedding folk songs.

Dropati's drummer was Sahadat Chedi, who was also the drummer for Ramdew Chaitoe, and many renowned Suriname Baithak Gana artists.
