= Ramdew Chaitoe =

Bhojpuri folk singer

Pt./Ust. Ramdew Chaitoe
- Ierada hai medine ka / Baso more nainen me nandelaal

Background information
- Born: Nieuw Nickerie, Suriname
- Origin: Suriname
- Died: Rotterdam, South Holland, Netherlands
- Genres: Baithak Gana
- Years active: 1978

Ramdew Chaitoe (19 December 1942 - 6 June 1994) was a Surinamese musician and a harmonium player, who released a Baithak Gana album called The King Of Suriname a.k.a The Star Melodies of Ramdew Chaitoe in 1976.

== Early life ==
Ramdew grew up on a farm. His father, songwriter/lyricist and harmonium instrumentalist Pundit Shastrie Sewpersad Chaitoe, was a considerable influence on Ramdew, inaugurating his son early in the musical art form, by having him perform weekly at Hindu temple ceremonies. This allowed the young Chaitoe to become skilled at his craft, thus allowing him to perform with the top singers and composers in Suriname as he matured. Throughout his travels in the Caribbean, Chaitoe acquired a strong reputation as a skilled harmonium player and singer. Ramdew Chaitoe traveled from the West Indies to Europe, and also had a show in New York.

== Music career ==
In 1976, Chaitoe released The King Of Suriname a.k.a The Star Melodies of Ramdew Chaitoe. This album is considered to be the first Baithak Gana album ever in Suriname. Moreover, due to the exposure that he received from this album, Chaitoe became a household name not just in Suriname but in the Indo-Caribbean world as well. In the popular manner of composition at the time, Chaitoe composed this album with religious and folk songs from the Purvanchal-Bhojpur, and Awadh regions of the present-day states of Uttar Pradesh and Bihar in India. These songs, like blue bhajans, captivated audiences with Chaitoe's artistic trend not just in Suriname but all over the Indo-Caribbean community. Chaitoe is regarded as one of the best singers of the Caribbean genre of Baithak Gana, which is still seen as the authoritative music genre in the Hindustani community. On June 6, 1994, Ramdew Chaitoe's died of a massive heart attack during his sleep in his home in Rotterdam, he left behind dozens of pieces of music for his thousands of fans throughout the Indo-Caribbean world. He suffered from alcoholism. Chaitoe is outlived by his son Pradeep Chaitoe, who is carrying on his legacy and tradition of singing and a sister Bidjanwatie Chaitoe, who is also a singer.
