= Baithak Gana =

Baithak gana बैठक गाना بیتک گانا
- Stylistic origins: Hindustani folk music, with influence from other Surinamese music genres and filmi
- Cultural origins: Mid-20th century, Indo-Surinamese people with indentured servant ancestry
- Typical instruments: dholak (hand drum), harmonium, and dhantal

Baithak Gana (Sarnami: बैठक गाना, بیتک گانا) is a form of music originating in Suriname by the Indo-Surinamese community. Baithak is a social gathering. It is a mix of Hindustani folk music with other Caribbean influences. It is similar to Chutney music that originated in Trinidad and Tobago. The most popular exponent in Surinam of the genre were Ramdew Chaitoe and Dropati.

== Instruments ==
In basic Baithak Gana there are three instruments, harmonium, dholak and the dhantal. The harmonium is a free-standing keyboard instrument similar to a reed organ. The dholak is a double headed drum that originated in Northern India, however, it is still used in the folk songs from Pakistan or Nepal. The last instrument that is used in this style of music is the dhantal which serves as the rhythmic piece of the ensemble, it consists of a long steel rod which is then "struck" by a U-formed piece, the origin of this device is unclear, as it may have been brought by the Indian indentured-laborers. The origin of the dhantal was formed from the use of a long steel rod with an almost-enclosed circle tip at the end used in the yoke of bull-driven carts that were used to transport sugar cane to guide the bulls. The U-shaped handle piece was derived from the use of a horse shoe.

== Places ==
Baithak Gana has its roots from the North Indian styles of music. The contract labours brought this form of style of music from India to South American, Caribbean, Oceanian, and African countries. In South America, you can think of the countries of Suriname and Guyana. In the Caribbean you can think of the countries of Trinidad and Tobago and Jamaica. In Oceania they mean the country Fiji. In Africa they mean the countries of Mauritius and South Africa. With the migration of the Indian community Baithak Gana has been exported to the Netherlands, the United States and Canada.

After the independence of Suriname in 1975, many Indo-Surinamese people migrated to the Netherlands and took their folk music along. Almost 40 years later the folk music has evolved into a new style. Implementing new music instruments such as a synthesizers and electronic drums.

== Artists and Musicians ==
Noteworthy artists that had a significant influence on Baithak Gana are Ramdew Chaitoe and Dropati.
