= Indian Arrival Day =

Holiday

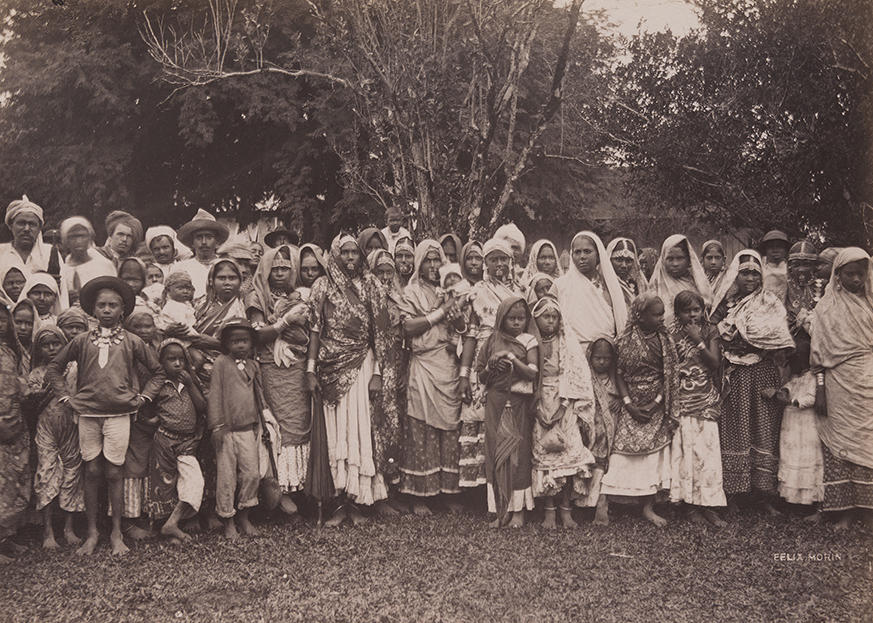
- Early Indian indentured arrivals in Trinidad and Tobago.
- Observed by: Fiji (celebrated as Girmit Day); Grenada; Guyana (celebrated as Arrival Day); Jamaica (celebrated as Indian Heritage Day); Mauritius (celebrated as Arrival of the Indentured Labourers); Saint Lucia; Saint Vincent and the Grenadines; South Africa; Suriname (celebrated as Prawas Din); Trinidad and Tobago
- Significance: Arrival of the first British Indian indentured laborers in each respective country.
- Celebrations: Celebrates South Asian-Indian people and their contributions.
- Observances: Parades, religious prayer services, and cultural shows
- Date: 1 May (Grenada); 5 May (Guyana); 6 May (Saint Lucia); 10 May (Jamaica); 14 May (Fiji); 30 May (Trinidad and Tobago); 1 June (Saint Vincent and the Grenadines); 5 June (Suriname); 2 November (Mauritius); 16 November (South Africa)
- Frequency: Annual
- Related to: Prawas Din; South Asian Heritage Month; Pravasi Bharatiya Divas; Asian American Heritage Month

Indian Arrival Day is a public holiday that was first started in Trinidad and Tobago to celebrate the East Indian immigrants arrival to the nation during the indentureship period.

It is now celebrated on various days in the nations of the Caribbean, Fiji, South Africa and Mauritius, commemorating the arrival of people from India and the wider subcontinent to their respective nations as indentured laborers brought by European colonial authorities and their agents. In Guyana, Mauritius, Fiji and Trinidad and Tobago, where it started, it is an official public holiday.

== By country ==
=== Fiji ===
A resolution was passed in public discussion that every year on 14 May as to be Girmit Remembrance Day. 14 May is the day that the Leonidas (the first ship of indentured Indians) arrived in Fiji in 1879. Throughout the country each year there are celebrations in memory of the Girmityas and Indian culture.

=== Grenada ===
The 100th anniversary of the first arrival of Indians in Grenada was commemorated in 1957. This was the first ever commemoration of the day in Grenada. The next commemoration would occur more than five decades later in 2009. On 29 April 2009, the Government of Grenada declared that 1 May would officially be designated as Indian Arrival Day and observed annually alongside the existing Labour Day. The date was already a public holiday in Grenada, on account of Labour Day. The Government also announced that Boucherie Road, the road leading to the site of the arrival of the Maidstone, would be officially renamed Maidstone Road to honour the arrival of Indians in Grenada. The renaming was officially carried out in a ceremony at 10:30 AM at La Fortune Junction, St. Patrick on 2 May 2009. Governor General Sir Carlyle Glean unveiled a granite plaque commemorating the arrival of the first Indians in Grenada. The plaque bears the inscription, "On 1st May 1857, in this bay the sailing vessel "Maidstone" anchored and landed 287 passengers having left India three months earlier, with 304 passengers. Between the years 1857 and 1890 other ships anchored in this and other bays bringing a total of 3,200 persons from India to work as agricultural indentured labourers in Grenada. This monument is dedicated to those who became the genesis of the Indo-Grenadian population of our nation".

=== Guyana ===
In Guyana the holiday is celebrated in May commemorating the first arrival of indentured labourers from India to the country, on May 5, 1838. On this day, the workers arrived in Guyana to work in sugar plantations. Their descendants today comprise 44 per cent of Guyana's population of over 750,000.

=== Jamaica ===
In 1995, the Government of Jamaica proclaimed 10 May, Indian Heritage Day, in recognition of the Indians' contribution to the social and economic development of the country. The arrival of the Indians more than 170 years ago is commemorated in stamps.

=== Mauritius ===
In Mauritius, the holiday is celebrated on 2 November to commemorate the arrival of Indian labourers. 65.8% of the total population is of Indian origins with Mauritius being the only African country with a Hindu majority. This date is specifically chosen as the ship Atlas arrived in Mauritius on Sunday 2 November 1834 with the first cargo of 36 Hill Coolies or indentured labourers of the Dhangar caste, organised by the Hunter-Arbuthnot & Company.

=== Saint Lucia ===
The Indian Diaspora of St. Lucia, an association promoting Indo-Saint Lucian heritage, organized the first Indian Arrival Day celebrations in Saint Lucia on 6 May 2013. The association is campaigning for the Saint Lucian government to officially declare 6 May as Indian Arrival Day. Many other Caribbean nations observe Indian Arrival Day annually to commemorate the date when the first Indians arrived in their respective countries.

=== Saint Vincent and the Grenadines ===
The Parliament of Saint Vincent and the Grenadines enacted an Act of Parliament on 26 March 2007 officially declaring 1 June as Indian Arrival Day. The first official commemoration of the event was held on 1 June that year. The day is marked annually by a re-enactment of the landing of Indians at Indian Bay, Kingstown, followed by a procession to Heritage Square. Several Indian cultural events are also held to mark the occasion. The first International Indian Diaspora Conference was held for the first time on 1–3 June 2012. It was organized by the St. Vincent and the Grenadines Chapter of the Global Organization of People of Indian Origin International (GOPIO-SVG), in partnership with the SVG Indian Heritage Foundation, and under the patronage of the SVG Ministry of Tourism and Culture. This was the first international conference for the Indian diaspora held in the country. Similar conferences had been held in other Caribbean nations since 1975.

The Government of the Saint Vincent and the Grenadines officially designated 7 October as Indian Heritage Day.

=== South Africa ===
Indian Arrival Day in South Africa is commemorated annually on November 16. It marks the historic day in 1860 when the SS Truro arrived in Port Natal (modern-day Durban) carrying the first 342 indentured Indian laborers from Madras (Chennai) to work on colonial sugarcane plantations.

Between 1860 and 1911, over 152,000 indentured workers were brought from India to South Africa. While the day honors their resilience and monumental cultural contributions, it also remembers the harsh, slave-like conditions they endured and the racial discrimination they subsequently fought against during Apartheid.

=== Suriname ===
In Suriname, Indian Arrival Day (Prawas Din) is celebrated on 5 June. On this day in 1873, a ship named Lalla Rookh, arrived in Paramaribo carrying the first batch of 399 Indian Indenture Labours.

=== Trinidad and Tobago ===
In Trinidad and Tobago, Indian Arrival Day is celebrated on 30 May. It commemorates the arrival of the first indentured labourers from India in May 1845 on a ship named Fatel Razack after a journey of five months, carrying 275 Indian indentured labourers. Trinidad and Tobago was the first country to start this holiday.

== History ==
Indian Arrival Day was first celebrated in Skinner Park, San Fernando, Trinidad and Tobago, as the East Indian Centenary on 30 May 1945 which marked the hundredth anniversary of the coming of Indians to Trinidad. The Acting Governor representing the Government of the United Kingdom attended indicating the significance of the observance. Other local dignitaries who addressed the large crowd included Timothy Roodal, George F. Fitzpatrick, Adrian Cola Rienzi, and Murli J. Kirpalani. Greetings were also read from Mahatma Gandhi, Lord Wavell and Colonel Stanley, the Secretary of State for the Colonies.

After the 1945 Centenary extravaganza, however, the celebration of the anniversary of 30 May gradually declined. By the 1950s, the Indians who were on the Fatel Razack as indentured labourers to Trinidad and Tobago were long gone. By the early seventies, the only Indian group was the Hindu Divine Life Society of Chaguanas who was staging an annual procession and ceremony under the name Indian Emigration Day.

Indian Emigration Day, as it was called then, had been celebrated by various organizations after 1945 with limited success. By 1973 the latest was organized by the Divine Life Society, which had organized small annual processions in Chaguanas for Indian Emigration Day. By the late seventies even that small remembrance was dwindling.

In 1976 the Indian Revival and Reform Association (IRRA) was formed. They were concerned about racism against Indians and were interested in developing ideas, writing pamphlets to bring about an Indian revival and renewed pride in Indian heritage and Indian culture. The IRRA wanted to preserve the good things about Indian heritage and reform the ones that were no longer useful or relevant. The anniversary of the coming of Indians to Guyana was one of the good things that came to the IRRA notice.

In 1977 IRRA formed committee was established to revive the memory of the coming of Indians to Trinidad on 30 May 1845; Indian Emigration Day. The initial historic Committee comprised Anand Rameshwar Singh, Khalique Khan, Ramdath Jagessar, Rajiv Sieunarine, Azamudeen "Danny" Jang, Michael Sankar and Rajesh Harricharan. The following year Rajnie Ramlakhan, Anand Maharaj and Ashok Gobin joined in the group's celebration.

The first active step was taken in early 1978, when they produced and distributed a one-page pamphlet with the title "Indian Emigration Day May 30, 1978". It gave a brief account of the coming of Indians in 1845, and the importance of the event. The names of the first pioneers on the Fatel Razack were listed, and there was a short description of the achievements of Indians in Trinidad since 1845. The Trinidad Express carried a press release, and the Trinidad Guardian printed an article by Kusha Haracksingh on the voyage of the Fatel Razack. Mastana Bahar dedicated a show to Indian Emigration Day. San Fernando Secondary School organized a celebration.

A major turning point occurred in 1979 when the group expanded by approaching the Sanatan Dharma Maha Sabha. The SDMS Secretary General Satnarayan Maharaj receptive to the idea, agreed to organize a major celebration at Lakshmi Girls College on 27 May 1979. IRRA and the SDMS in discussions agreed that Indians were no longer emigrants to Trinidad and Tobago, but citizens who had arrived 134 years before. Coming out of this discussion the name was then changed to Indian Arrival Day.

The 1979 celebration was a great success and included the presence of some of the original immigrants born in British India. Government ministers Sham and Kamal Mohammed were there, as was the Indian High Commissioner and Presbyterian Church moderator Idris Hamid. The event was widely covered by the local media and immediately knew about the event. In fact it took just two years and an idea to revive the memory of the Arrival of Indians in Trinidad and Tobago to awaken the entire Indian community in Trinidad and Tobago.

Subsequent years the Hindu Seva Sangh and other smaller groups approached the IRRA for guidance in developing in various communities throughout Trinidad and Tobago. By 1980 Indian Arrival Day celebrations were held at the Spring Village in Curepe, Cedros, Couva, Penal, Debe, San Juan, Chaguanas, and many other parts of the country. The National Joint Action Committee, the Catholic Church, other churches, libraries, masjids, mandirs, and schools at this point joined in the observances. In a short time, Indian Arrival Day was sweeping through the country. By 1985 there were more than 10 significant Indian Arrival Day celebrations taking place. The Hindu community took the lead in the development of the celebrations.

In 1991 Members of Parliament Trevor Sudama and Raymond Pallackdarrysingh first introduced to the House of Representatives the concept that Indian Arrival Day should be made a national public holiday. This call to make Indian Arrival Day a public holiday continued to be unheeded until 1995 Prime Minister Patrick Manning declared that the 150th Anniversary would be a public holiday called Indian Arrival Day, but thereafter the holiday will be called Arrival Day. The 1995 celebrations surpassed the 1945 celebrations with the Sanatan Dharma Maha Sabha having major celebrations in Trinidad and Tobago

In 1996 Prime Minister Basdeo Panday declared that 30 May would be known as Indian Arrival Day and not Arrival Day. However, in the birthplace of Indian Arrival Day – Trinidad and Tobago – there is a lobby to remove the word 'Indian' from the name. In the 1990s the Sanatan Dharma Maha Sabha expanded the Indian Arrival Day celebrations and dubbed May as "Indian Heritage Month" which ends on Indian Arrival Day.

== Observances in different countries ==
Since its establishment in Trinidad and Tobago, Indian Arrival Day has given rise to similar celebrations in Fiji, Grenada, Guyana, Jamaica, Mauritius, Saint Lucia, Saint Vincent and the Grenadines, South Africa, Suriname, the United Kingdom, the United States, Canada, New Zealand, and Australia. However, there is no similar celebration in Malaysia, Singapore, Réunion, Seychelles, Tanzania, Uganda, or Kenya, which are also home to somewhat large Indian-origin populations.
